= List of organisms named after famous people (born 1950–1974) =

In biological nomenclature, organisms often receive scientific names that honor a person. A taxon (e.g., species or genus; plural: taxa) named in honor of another entity is an eponymous taxon, and names specifically honoring a person or persons are known as patronyms. Scientific names are generally formally published in peer-reviewed journal articles or larger monographs along with descriptions of the named taxa and ways to distinguish them from other taxa. Following the ICZN's International Code of Zoological Nomenclature, based on Latin grammar, species or subspecies names derived from a man's name often end in -i or -ii if named for an individual, and -orum if named for a group of men or mixed-sex group, such as a family. Similarly, those named for a woman often end in -ae, or -arum for two or more women.

This list is part of the list of organisms named after famous people, and includes organisms named after famous individuals born between 1 January 1950 and 31 December 1974. It also includes ensembles (including bands) in which at least one member was born after that date; but excludes companies, institutions, ethnic groups or nationalities, and populated places. It does not include organisms named for fictional entities, for biologists, paleontologists or other natural scientists, (Note: Arachnologist Norman I. Platnick, for instance, has 58 eponymous taxa as of 2021.) nor for associates or family members of researchers who are not otherwise notable (exceptions are made, however, for natural scientists who are much more famous for other aspects of their lives, such as, for example, rock musician Greg Graffin).

Organisms named after famous people born earlier than 1950 can be found in:

- List of organisms named after famous people (born before 1800)
- List of organisms named after famous people (born 1800–1899)
- List of organisms named after famous people (born 1900–1924)
- List of organisms named after famous people (born 1925–1949)

Organisms named after famous people born later than 1974 can be found in:

- List of organisms named after famous people (born 1975–present)

The scientific names are given as originally described (their basionyms): subsequent research may have placed species in different genera, or rendered them taxonomic synonyms of previously described taxa. Some of these names may be unavailable in the zoological sense or illegitimate in the botanical sense due to senior homonyms already having the same name.

== List (people born 1950–1974) ==
Yellow background shading indicates that this taxon name has been subsequently modified (e.g. species transferred to a different genus), but the eponymy is still valid
Pink background shading indicates that this taxon name is invalid because of homonymy, or has been synonymised and is no longer in use, or is considered a nomen dubium

Taxon	Type	Namesake	Notes	Taxon image	Namesake image	Ref
Abba Castanheira & Framenau, 2023	Spider	ABBA	A genus of Australian orb-weaving spiders whose name "honours the Swedish pop group ABBA whose songs and subsequent musicals Mamma Mia! (2008) and Mamma Mia! Here We Go Again (2018), provided hours of entertainment for the authors."			
Acanthobothrium zimmeri Fyler, Caira & Jensen, 2009	Tapeworm	Carl Zimmer	"named for Carl Zimmer who, through his colourful contributions to the popular literature, has done much to enhance the reputation of parasites." Zimmer wrote in his blog: "When I first discovered I was going to have a species named for me, I was overwhelmed by delusions of grandeur. But at [a] parasitology meeting, I was quickly brought back down to Earth. Fyler mentioned to another tapeworm expert that she was naming a species for me, and he said, "Yeah, I guess that makes sense. Acanthrobothrium is kind of tall and thin like you." [...] I'm still grateful for Fyler's gesture, and I still can't help feeling some vaguely paternal pleasure at seeing how A. zimmeri helps scientists learn a little bit more about the diversity of life and how that diversity evolved."			
Acanthosquilla sirindhorn Naiyanetr, 1995	Crustacean	Sirindhorn	"The specific name is given in honour of Her Royal Highness Princess Maha Chakri Sirindhorn, as a token of respect and in recognition of Her great interest in the study of the natural history of Thailand. Her Royal Highness graciously permitted the use of Her name for this beautiful and interesting species. It seems the more appropriate to attach the name of Her Royal Highness to the present stomatopod, because in 1983 Her Royal Highness (under the pseudonym Waen Kaeo) published a book for small children, entitled Kaeo Chom Kaen, in the first chapter of which a stomatopod, somewhat similar to the present, plays a dominant role." Subsequently, synonymised with Acanthosquilla derijardi			
Acer binzayedii Vargas-Rodriguez, 2017	Flowering plant	Mohamed bin Zayed Al Nahyan	A species of maple tree found in Jalisco, Mexico. "The specific epithet honors a philanthropist committed to the protection of the environment and the preservation of species, His Highness Sheikh Mohammed bin Zayed Al Nahyan, Crown Prince of Abu Dhabi and Deputy Supreme Commander of the United Arab Emirates Armed Forces. Through his philanthropic endowment, the first author was able to conduct phylogeographic and taxonomic studies of Acer in tropical America; this research led to the discovery and recognition of this new species."			
Acrotaphus jackiechani Pádua & Sääksjärvi, 2020	Wasp	Jackie Chan	"The specific epithet, "jackiechani", is the Latinized genitive form of the name Jackie Chan, chinese actor and director of several films, in [sic] which the first author is a fan."			
Actaea grimaldii Ng & Bouchet, 2015	Crustacean	Albert II, Prince of Monaco	The prince was born Albert Grimaldi. This species of gorilla crab from Papua New Guinea was named "in honour of His Serene Highness Albert II, Prince of Monaco, patron of the PAPUA NIUGINI Expedition and several other biodiversity expeditions of the "Our Planet Reviewed" programme conducted by MNHN and Pro-Natura International. The red and white colour pattern of the new species also alludes to the colours associated with the House of Grimaldi."			
Actinopus anselmoi Miglio, Pérez-Miles & Bonaldo, 2020	Spider	Phil Anselmo	"The specific name refers to musician Philip Hansen Anselmo, or Phil Anselmo, the main singer of Pantera, one of the most respected thrash metal bands of the world."			
Actinopus cornelli Miglio, Pérez-Miles & Bonaldo, 2020	Spider	Chris Cornell	"The specific name is a patronym honoring musician Chris Cornell, one of the founders of grunge music."			
Actinopus reznori Miglio, Pérez-Miles & Bonaldo, 2020	Spider	Trent Reznor	"The specific name refers to musician and multi-instrumentalist Michael Trent Reznor, founder of industrial music, leader of the Nine Inch Nails and affiliated to many other bands, in addition to his producer career."			
Aenictus shilintongae Jaitrong & Schultz, 2016	Ant	Sirindhorn	An army ant from China "named in honor of Her Royal Highness Princess Maha Chakri Sirindhorn of the Kingdom of Thailand after her name in Chinese." (詩琳通公主, Shī lín tōng). The lead author of the description was Thai.			
Aetana ondawamei Huber, 2019	Spider	John Ondawame	A cellar spider native to West Papua, "named for Papuan activist John Ondawame (1953–2014) who promoted a peaceful solution to the conflict in West Papua."			
Agaporomorphus colberti Miller & Wheeler, 2008	Beetle	Stephen Colbert	According to Quentin Wheeler, the scientist who discovered this diving beetle, he named it after Colbert because "Stephen shamelessly asked the science community to name something cooler than a spider to honor him. His top choices were a giant ant or a laser lion. While those would be cool species to discover, our research involves beetles, and they are 'way cooler' than a spider any day."			
Agerina boygeorgei † Karim & Adrain, 2022	Trilobite	Boy George				
Agra catbellae Erwin, 2002	Beetle	Catherine Bell	"The specific epithet, catbellae, is the Latinized genitive form of the combined name of the actress starring on the current TV program "JAG", Catherine Bell. These beetles share the forest with an elegant cat, the jaguar."			
Agroecotettix burtoni Hill, 2024	Grasshopper	LeVar Burton	"honoring LeVar Burton, an iconic American actor, director, and children's television host renowned for his influential work in promoting literacy and education, particularly through his long-running role as the host of Reading Rainbow. Additionally, Burton is celebrated for his inspirational portrayal of Lieutenant Commander Geordi La Forge in Star Trek: The Next Generation and its spin-offs. His contributions to education and his advocacy for intellectual and cultural enrichment make him a fitting namesake for a species that thrives in the Big Bend region of Texas where deep history, nature, and vast starry skies come together in a unique American landscape."			
Agroecotettix dorni Hill, 2024	Grasshopper	Michael Dorn	"honoring Michael Dorn, an American actor and narrator born in Texas who is most famous for portraying the Star Trek character Worf in the television series Star Trek: The Next Generation and its spin-offs. The name highlights a unique morphological characteristic of the species, drawing a creative parallel between the blade like aedeagus valves of the male genitalia and the form of the kur'leth, a traditional Klingon weapon used by Worf."			
Agromyza princei Eiseman & Lonsdale, 2019	Fly	Prince	"This species is named for Prince (born Prince Rogers Nelson; 1958–2016), composer and performer of the song "Raspberry Beret," who died shortly before the larva was discovered mining a leaf of black raspberry."			
Agyneta danielbelangeri Dupérré, 2013	Spider	Daniel Bélanger	"in honor of Daniel Bélanger, a Québécois author-composer and singer, for his music and poetry that accompanied countless hours of spider studies."			
Ajkanesia harmincipsziloni † Szabó & Brazidec, 2022	Wasp	30Y	A fossil species found in Cretaceous ajkaite amber from Hungary, whose name "honours the alternative rock band 30Y. In Hungarian, the band's name is phonetically written as "harminc ipszilon". The band got its name after the Szombathely (western Hungary) bus service nr 30Y. Three members of the band, namely Zoltán Beck, László Beck and Zoltán Sárközy spent part of their childhood in the city of Ajka, from where the holotype specimen originates."			
Albunea groeningi Boyko, 2002	Crustacean	Matt Groening	"This species is named after Matt Groening, cartoonist and creator of the television program The Simpsons, to honor his extensive promotion of crustacean issues in the popular media. The Simpsons has exposed people to a diversity of crustacean species, including Lisa's hermit crab, Patty and Selma's hermit crab cleaning techniques, and, of course, "Pinchy" the lobster. The specific name is pronounced "gray-ningi.""			
Aleiodes butcheri Butcher et al., 2012	Wasp	Jim Butcher				
Aleiodes colberti Shimbori & Shaw, 2014	Wasp	Stephen Colbert				
Aleiodes elleni Shimbori & Shaw, 2014	Wasp	Ellen DeGeneres				
Aleiodes falloni Shimbori & Shaw, 2014	Wasp	Jimmy Fallon				
Aleiodes stewarti Shimbori & Shaw, 2014	Wasp	Jon Stewart				
Almafuerte Grismado & Carrión, 2017	Spider	Pedro Bonifacio Palacios and Almafuerte	A genus of South American ground spiders; ""Almafuerte" is the pseudonymous [sic] of Pedro Bonifacio Palacios (San Justo 1854 - La Plata 1917), an influential Argentine poet and teacher; the name is also shared with a famous Argentine heavy-metal band leaded [sic] by Ricardo Iorio."			
Alocasia farisii Zulhazman, Norziel. & P.C.Boyce	Flowering plant	Muhammad V of Kelantan	An aroid from Kelantan, Malaysia, "named for HRH Tengku Mohammad Faris Petra Ibni Tengku Ismail Petra, now known as Sultan Mohamad V, the Sultan of the Malaysian State of Kelantan, in recognition of his great enthusiasm in conserving rare and endemic species in Kelantan."			
Aluis spinettai † López-Gappa & Pérez, 2019	Bryozoan	Luis Alberto Spinetta	A fossil from the Miocene of Argentina; "The name chosen for the new genus and species honours the memory of the Argentine musician and composer Luis Alberto Spinetta (1950–2012)."			
Alviniconcha strummeri Johnson et al., 2014	Sea snail	Joe Strummer	"The name highlights the 'hardcore' nature of Alviniconcha snails, that inhabit the hottest, most acidic and most sulphidic microhabitats at Indo-Pacific hydrothermal vents. The name also recognizes the surface of Alviniconcha shells: the spiky periostracum resembles the fashion of punk rock bands."			
Ameira zahaae Karanovic & Cho, 2012	Crustacean	Zaha Hadid	A copepod from the coast of South Korea, "dedicated to a renowned contemporary Iraqi-British architect Ms Zaha Hadid, who is designing one of the most ambitious projects in Seoul: the Dongdaemun Design Plaza & Park. Senior author's admiration of her work worldwide may contribute to a view of this architectural complex as an embodiment of modern Korea."			
Amblypharyngodon chulabhornae Vidthayanon & Kottelat, 1990	Fish	Chulabhorn	A freshwater carplet native to rivers of Thailand and Cambodia, "named in honour of H.R.H. Princess Chulabhorn Mahidol of Thailand in recognition of her interest and patronage of research and development in science and technology, including biology and fisheries. The Thai vemacular name is "Siew Chao Pha Chulabhorn" (ซิวเจ้าฟ้าจุฬาภรณ์)."			
Amphinema rollinsi Widmer, 2007	Jellyfish	Henry Rollins	"The species is named in honor of Henry Rollins, artist, activist, and philosopher. It is the best way I know to thank him for his much appreciated and noble United Service Organizations (USO) service."			
Anaphes maradonae Jesu, 2003	Wasp	Diego Maradona	A fairyfly described from specimens collected in Southern Italy, and named "in honour of Diego Armando Maradona. First, because I think that he [has] been the greatest football player of [all] time, and his performances will continue to be impressed in my mind (and of all supporters of S.S.C. Napoli) forever, and second because the new species develops (indirectly) on a plant from which the ephedrine is extracted (alkaloid to which Maradona was discovered positive at [the] Football World Cup carried [out in the] U.S.A in 1994)."; Subsequently, synonymized with Anaphes brevis.			
Anadia hollandi Amézquita et al., 2022	Lizard	Jim Holland (ski jumper)	A spectacled lizard from Colombia named "in honour of Jim Holland, American olympic skier who enjoys the natural world and the challenges of outdoor exploration, for his generous contribution to the conservation of cloud forests in Colombia."			
Anaulacomera sylviae Fianco, 2021	Katydid	Sylvia Rivera	"The specific name honours Sylvia Rivera [...], a trans woman activist, who led the LGBTQI+ liberation movements that started in June of 1969, in the United States of America."			
Andrena hadfieldi Sheffield, 2020	Bee	Chris Hadfield	"It is a privilege to name this new species after Canadian astronaut Col. Chris Hadfield for his many achievements as a pilot, astronaut, author, lecturer, and science educator."			
Anguiculus dicaprioi Mirza et al., 2024	Snake	Leonardo DiCaprio	"honouring Leonardo DiCaprio, an American actor, film producer, and environmentalist who has been actively involved in creating awareness about global climate change, increased biodiversity loss, and human health issues through pollution. In addition to this, he has made funds available for field conservation activities and research."			
Angusticopula rowlingiana Van de Vijver, Wilfert, D.M.John & Houk, 2019	Diatom	J. K. Rowling	"The species is named after the famous British writer Mrs. J.K. Rowling to honor her for all her efforts to make children read books again, a first step in a possible future career as a scientist."			
Anomala manseri Zorn, 2007	Beetle	Bruno Manser	A shining leaf chafer endemic to Borneo and "dedicated to Bruno Manser, a Swiss rain forest and human rights activist who is missing in Sarawak since 2000."			
Antipathozoanthus remengesaui Kise et.al., 2017	Coral	Thomas Remengesau Jr.	The holotype of this wide-ranging zoanthid species was collected in Palau, and the species "named after Tommy Esang Remengesau, Jr., the current president of the Republic of Palau, who has greatly contributed to marine research and conservation in Palau."			
Aphelinus elvestueni Japoshvili & Hansen, 2014	Wasp	Ola Elvestuen	A parasitoid wasp from Norway.			
Aposphragisma brunomanseri Thoma	Spider	Bruno Manser	A goblin spider native to Sarawak, Malaysia, "dedicated to Bruno Manser (*1954, missing, presumed dead), a Swiss environmental activist and ethnologist, most famous for his support of the nomadic indigenous Penan people against the destruction of pristine rain forest in the Malaysian state of Sarawak."			
Aptostichus barackobamai Bond, 2012	Spider	Barack Obama	"in honor of Barack Obama, first African American President of the United States and reputed fan of spiders."			
Aptostichus bonoi Bond, 2012	Spider	Bono	The species occurs in Joshua Tree National Park and was named in recognition of U2's 1987 album The Joshua Tree.			
Aptostichus pennjillettei Bond, 2012	Spider	Penn Jillette	Named for Jillette's "advocacy of freethinking and scientific skepticism"			
Aptostichus stephencolberti Bond & Stockman, 2008	Spider	Stephen Colbert	"The specific epithet is a patronym, named in honor of Mr. Stephen Colbert. Mr. Colbert is a fellow citizen who truly has the courage of his convictions and is willing to undertake the very difficult and sometimes unpopular work of speaking out against those who have done irreparable harm to our country and the world through both action and inaction. He will be especially remembered [...] for his speech at the 2006 White House Correspondents Dinner."			
Arcticalymene cooki † Adrain & Edgecombe, 1997	Trilobite	Paul Cook	Five species in this genus were concurrently named after the members of the Sex Pistols.			
Arcticalymene jonesi † Adrain & Edgecombe, 1997	Trilobite	Steve Jones	Five species in this genus were concurrently named after the members of the Sex Pistols.			
Arcticalymene matlocki † Adrain & Edgecombe, 1997	Trilobite	Glen Matlock	Five species in this genus were concurrently named after the members of the Sex Pistols.			
Arcticalymene rotteni † Adrain & Edgecombe, 1997	Trilobite	John Lydon (aka Johnny Rotten)	Five species in this genus were concurrently named after the members of the Sex Pistols.			
Arcticalymene viciousi † Adrain & Edgecombe, 1997	Trilobite	Sid Vicious	Five species in this genus were concurrently named after the members of the Sex Pistols.			
Areca jokowi Heatubun	Palm	Joko Widodo	"This new species is dedicated to Mr. Joko Widodo for his exemplary leadership, his simplicity, and more importantly for his concern for the development of Tanah Papua (the Indonesian Provinces of Papua and West Papua)" (known distribution of this palm)			
Arenivaga adamsi Hopkins, 2014	Cockroach	Douglas Adams	"This species is named in honor and fond remembrance of Douglas Adams, whose writing makes me laugh, and who loved and respected all life on this planet."			
Argemiones stupeflip † Brazidec, 2023	Wasp	Stupeflip	A fossil species from Cretaceous Burmese amber, described by a French scientist and "dedicated to the French musical group Stupeflip, which explores several musical genres such as hip-hop, punk, electronic music and pop." Genus Argemiones, created concurrently, refers to the Argémiones, "a people in Stupeflip's musical universe ('Humans are bitter, the music grows louder / The Argemiones attacked in defiance' – Stupeflip: "Stup Monastère" [2005])"			
Argentinala cristinae † Petrulevičius & Gutiérrez, 2016	Dragonfly	Cristina Fernández de Kirchner	A fossil Odonatoptera from the Carboniferous of La Rioja Province, Argentina, named "in honour of Argentinean (twice) President (2007–2015) Cristina Fernández de Kirchner. She elevated the Secretary of Science to Ministry rank, creating in 2007 the Ministerio de Ciencia, Tecnología e Innovación Productiva (Ministry of Science, Technology and Productive Innovation). Within the Ministry, the CONICET experienced a quali-quantitative leap in all fields: infrastructure, number of workers, projects, organization and production."			
Argiope legionis Motta & Levi, 2009	Spider	Legião Urbana	"The specific name honors Legião Urbana (Urban Legion), a rock band from Brasília and one of the most important musical groups from Brazil at the end of the 20th century." The type locality for this species is in Brasília.			
Aricidea pearti Barroso, Paiva & Ranauro, 2020	Polychaete worm	Neil Peart	"The species name is in honor of the recently deceased Neil Peart, the drummer from the rock band Rush, whose wonderful and engaging lyrics accompanied the second author for many years while observing polychaetes through optical microscopy."			
Astraeus sirindhorniae Watling et al., 2014	Fungus	Sirindhorn	A species of false earthstar mushroom native to Thailand, "named after Princess Sirindhorn on the occasion the 84th birthday of her father, who have both been supportive of natural heritage studies in Thailand and as a token of respect and recognition of the great interest shown by Her Majesty in the natural history and conservation of natural resources of Thailand."			
Astrosombra rammsteinensis † Thuy, Gale & Numberger-Thuy, 2019	Brittle star	Rammstein	A fossil species from the Cretaceous of Rügen island, Germany. "[Genus] name formed by combining 'Astro', derived from the Greek 'astron' (meaning celestrial body) and referring to the superficial similarity with the non-related, star-shaped [genus] Astrophiura, and 'sombra', in reference to the Spanish word 'sombra' (meaning shade) and the French word 'sombre' (meaning dark), thus collectively translating into 'dark star'. [...] Species named in honour of German rock band Rammstein, in recognition of their musical achievements, and because they are true dark stars."			
Atheris hetfieldi Ceríaco, Marques & Bauer, 2020	Snake	James Hetfield	Named after Hetfield "for the inspiration, endurance and sanity that his music provides to the authors while roaming the academic world. [...] The authors said "[We] are big fans of Metallica and James Hetfield since a very young age. We wanted to honor him, as a thank you for all the good vibes his music has transmitted to us during all of our personal lives and careers. Also, we think that a mysterious venomous and cool looking snake, who lives in the base of a volcano lost in the middle of the tropical forest is very relatable to heavy metal! On another hand, naming a new species after someone as James brings more attention to the much needed biodiversity studies and field surveys. We are in race against the extinction of a large proportion of the world's biodiversity, and many species may go extinct before we even know they exist!." This snake lives in Bioko island in Equatorial Guinea and is characterised by "a triangular-shaped head and strongly-keeled scales, which gives them a dragon-like appearance, which certainly is consonant with the image of a singer of a heavy metal band."			
Atractides marizae Pešić, 2023	Mite	Mariza	A water mite from Portugal, "named in honor of Marisa dos Reis Nunes, known professionally as Mariza, a famous Portuguese fado singer in the appreciation of the enjoyment her music brings to the authors."			
Atractus pearti Passos et al., 2024	Snake	Neil Peart	"named in honor of Neil Ellwood Peart [...]. He was an influential Canadian musician and writer, best known as the drummer and primary lyricist of the unparalleled progressive rock band, Rush. Peart received numerous awards for his amazing musical performances and multifaceted lyrics, including fantasy, science fiction, mythology, and philosophy. [...] The penultimate and 19th Rush studio album was named Snakes & Arrows and brings to its loyal fanbase another piece of their brilliant artwork. We dedicate this species to him for his life example that inspires integrity, commitment, sophistication, and perseverance to generations of rock listeners around world. [sic]"			
Aulacopleura andersoni † Adrain & Chatterton, 1995	Trilobite	Glenn Anderson	Thirteen Canadian species were named, in a series of four papers, after members of the Edmonton Oilers team that won the 1990 Stanley Cup (See also species in genera Cyphaspis, Harpidella, Maurotarion, Otarion and Songkania).			
Aulacopleura ranfordi † Adrain & Chatterton, 1995	Trilobite	Bill Ranford	Thirteen Canadian species were named, in a series of four papers, after members of the Edmonton Oilers team that won the 1990 Stanley Cup (See also species in genera Cyphaspis, Harpidella, Maurotarion, Otarion and Songkania).			
Augyles letovi Sazhnev, 2018	Beetle	Yegor Letov	"Dedicated to Igor Fedorovich "Yegor" Letov, Russian poet, musician, singer, songwriter, audio engineer and conceptual art painter, best known as the founder and leader of the post-punk/psychedelic rock band Grazhdanskaya Oborona (Civil Defense)."			
Baicalellia daftpunka Stephenson, Van Steenkiste & Leander, 2018	Flatworm	Daft Punk	The flatworm has a helmet-shaped structure on the end of the penis, thus the species name refers to Daft Punk, an electronic music duo who wore helmets while performing publicly.			
Balmaceda abba Edwards & Baert, 2018	Spider	ABBA	A jumping spider from the Galápagos Islands.			
Baracktrema obamai Roberts, Platt & Bullard, 2016	Fluke	Barack Obama	"named in honor of Barack Obama, 44th president of the United States of America, and 5th cousin, twice removed, of [the second author]."			
Bathyurina curtisi † Adrain, Karim & Westrop, 2014	Trilobite	Ian Curtis	Four species in this genus were concurrently named after the members of Joy Division.			
Bathyurina hooki † Adrain, Karim & Westrop, 2014	Trilobite	Peter Hook	Four species in this genus were concurrently named after the members of Joy Division.			
Bathyurina morrisi † Adrain, Karim & Westrop, 2014	Trilobite	Stephen Morris	Four species in this genus were concurrently named after the members of Joy Division.			
Bathyurina sumneri † Adrain, Karim & Westrop, 2014	Trilobite	Bernard Sumner	Four species in this genus were concurrently named after the members of Joy Division.			
Bauhinia sirindhorniae K.Larsen & S.Larsen	Legume	Sirindhorn	This species, endemic to Thailand, was "by gracious permission, dedicated to Her Royal Highness Princess Maha Chakri Sirindhorn, who has made great efforts to conserve the natural environments in Thailand."; Subsequently transferred to genus Phanera.			
Begonia dorisiae Bucay, Tandang & K.F.Chung	Flowering plant	Doris Bigornia	A begonia endemic to Mindanao, Philippines, named "a tribute to broadcaster Doris Bigornia whose name became an informal, yet very useful monicker of the genus Begonia especially for local communities. Many Filipino botanists, particularly in this series of expeditions, find that the easiest way to make citizens remember the genus Begonia is to associate it with 'Bigornia'. Across different islands and demographics, the best way to capture citizens' interest when communicating the biology of Philippine Begonia is, in fact, Doris Bigornia."			
Begonia leasalongae F.A.Blasco, Alejandro & Rubite	Flowering plant	Lea Salonga	A begonia endemic to Mindanao, Philippines, named "in recognition of Lea Salonga's extraordinary achievements in the performing arts and for elevating Filipino talent on the global stage through her acclaimed career on Broadway and the West End."			
Begonia noraaunorae F.A.Blasco, Tandang, Alejandro & Rubite	Flowering plant	Nora Aunor	A begonia endemic to Mindanao, Philippines, "named after Nora Aunor, to honor her achievements in the entertainment industry. Born Nora Cabaltera Villamayor (1953–), 'Ate Guy' as fondly called by her colleagues, friends and fans is the only Filipino actor to have won international acting awards from five continents. Film producer, TV host, actor, singer, philanthropist and National Artist for Film and Broadcast Arts awardee (the highest national recognition given to a Filipino artist)."			
Begonia sirindhorniana Phutthai, Thanant., Srisom & Suddee	Flowering plant	Sirindhorn	A begonia native to Thailand named "in honour of Her Royal Highness Princess Maha Chakri Sirindhorn for her dedication to science and encouragement of conservation in Thailand."			
Bembidion brownorum Maddison, Sproul & Will, 2023	Beetle	Jerry Brown and Anne Gust Brown	"The specific epithet [...] refers to Jerry and Anne Brown, former Governor and First Lady of California, respectively. The name is formed in their honor as it was their hospitality and openness to allowing access for research of insects on their ranch, the type locality, which led to the discovery of this species. Additionally, this honors their long commitment to environmentalism and continued efforts in the international climate-change movement."			
Bisticeratops froeseorum † Dalman et al., 2022	Dinosaur	Edgar Froese and Jerome Froese	A ceratopsian dinosaur from the Cretaceous of New Mexico, USA. "The specific epithet honors the late Edgar Froese, the founder of the instrumental music band Tangerine Dream, and his son Jerome Froese, the former member of Tangerine Dream and the founder and leader of the instrumental music band Loom."			
Blixaea Gottschling, 2017	Protist	Blixa Bargeld	One of two genera of dinoflagellates named concurrently after the two permanent members of Einstürzende Neubauten (see also Unruhdinium).			
Bloszykiella lindemanni Kontschán & Ermilov, 2020	Mite	Till Lindemann				
Bloszykiella rammsteini Kontschán & Ermilov, 2020	Mite	Rammstein				
Bombus menchuae Asperen de Boer, 1995	Bee	Rigoberta Menchú	A bumblebee described from specimens collected in the Guatemalan Highlands, "dedicated to Rigoberta Menchú Tum, winner of the Nobel Prize for Peace 1992, herself from Highland Guatemala and a staunch defender of the rights of the indigenous people of Guatemala."; Subsequently synonymised with Bombus macgregori.			
Bouchardium chillygonzalesi Kamiński, 2024	Beetle	Chilly Gonzales				
Bradyfallotaspis nicolascagei † Gapp, Lieberman, Pope & Dilliard, 2011	Trilobite	Nicolas Cage	"Named in honor of trilobite enthusiast and Hollywood actor Nicolas Cage."			
Brezinacantha tolis † Thuy et al., 2018	Brittle star	Sakis Tolis and Themis Tolis	A fossil species from the Cretaceous of South Dakota, US, named after two founding members of Rotting Christ to "honour their unorthodox yet powerful approach to music. The[se] ophiuroids [...] merit in many ways a Black-Metal-referenced name: they gathered in great numbers in a spooky, toxic environment on top of their dead predecessors' remains." Sakis Tolis said "This is one of the greatest honors I have received as an individual and musician and it gives me power to keep on creating and offer these wild times."			
Brignolia shyami Ranasinghe & Benjamin, 2016	Spider	Shyam Selvadurai	A goblin spider native to Sri Lanka "Named for Shyam Selvadurai, a Sri Lankan Canadian novelist best known for the novels Funny Boy and Cinnamon Gardens." Selvadurai said "This came as a complete surprise and I was thrilled. It's so surprising too that anyone would think to honour writers. Usually it's other scientists or political and social leaders [...] I also felt particularly happy to be recognized in Sri Lanka in this way. It validated all the work I do in the country in terms of reconciliation and also my work as curator of the Galle Literary Festival. And of course my novels too."			
Bristolia colberti † Gapp & Lieberman, 2014	Trilobite	Stephen Colbert				
Bufonaria borisbeckeri Parth, 1996	Sea snail	Boris Becker	"I dedicate the new species to Boris Becker, in my opinion the greatest German individual sportsman of all time." Subsequently transferred to the genus Bursina.			
Bulbophyllum irianae de Vogel, Suhartawan, Hoogend. & Heatubun	Orchid	Iriana Joko Widodo	A species from Papua Province, Indonesia, "named in honour of Lady Iriana Joko Widodo, First Lady of Indonesia, at the occasion of the 2018 International Conference on Biodiversity, Ecotourism, and Creative Economy (ICBE), Manokwari, 2018, in recognition of her efforts to stimulate and support the development processes in Papua and West Papua Provinces."			
Buxus sirindhorniana W.K.Soh, M.von Sternburg, Hodk. & J.Parn.	Flowering plant	Sirindhorn	A species of box native to Thailand, named "to honour Her Royal Highness Princess Maha Chakri Sirindhorn of Thailand, who is a strong advocate for the preservation of biodiversity in the country."			
Caccothryptus abboti Matsumoto, 2021	Beetle	Nick Abbot				
Caccothryptus arakawae Matsumoto, 2021	Beetle	Hiromu Arakawa				
Caloplaca obamae Knudsen (2009)	Lichen	Barack Obama	"for his support of science and scientific education."			
Cantharis kviumi † Fanti & Damgaard, 2020	Beetle	Michael Kvium	A fossil soldier beetle found in Baltic amber from the Eocene of Kaliningrad Oblast.			
Cantharis mikkelsenorum † Fanti & Damgaard, 2018	Beetle	Lars Mikkelsen and Mads Mikkelsen	A fossil soldier beetle found in Baltic amber from the Eocene of Kaliningrad Oblast. "This new species is named in honour of the Danish actors Lars Dittmann Mikkelsen and Mads Dittmann Mikkelsen, in recognition of their contribution to the television, theatre and film industries."			
Carcinonemertes conanobrieni Simpson, Ambrosio & Baeza, 2017	Ribbon worm	Conan O'Brien	A marine worm which preys on the eggs of the Caribbean spiny lobster (Panulirus argus), "named after the social commentator and comedian Conan O'Brien. The physical similarities between the new species and Mr. O'Brien are remarkable; both exhibit a long and pale soma with slight tints of orange."			
Carmenelectra † Evenhuis, 2002	Fly	Carmen Electra				
Carpotroche caceresiae D. Santam	Flowering plant	Berta Cáceres	A species native to Honduras and Nicaragua, "named in memory and recognition of the bravery of Berta Isabel Cáceres Flores (1971–2016), one of 123 environmental activists assassinated in retaliation for their opposition to environmental destruction and loss of indigenous land in Honduras, between 2009 and 2016 [...]. Berta Cáceres [...], in particular, was murdered because of her opposition to the Agua Zarcas [sic] hydroelectric project. She won the Goldman Environmental Prize in 2015."			
Caulleryaspis chicosciencei Craveiro & Rosa Filho, 2023	Polychaete worm	Chico Science	A mud owl worm collected from Suape Port in Pernambuco, Brazil, and "named after Francisco de Assis França (stage name Chico Science), a remarkable Brazilian singer and songwriter (13 March 1966–02 February 1997), and one of the main collaborators and influencers in the manguebeat musical movement, along with the band 'Nação Zumbi'." Chico Science was from Olinda, another coastal city of Pernambuco, very close to Suape Port.			
Cebrennus rambodjavani Moradmand, Zamani & Jäger, 2016	Spider	Rambod Javan	A huntsman spider from Iran, "named after Mr Rambod Javan, an Iranian actor, director and comedian in recognition of his invaluable movements seeking to improve and protect natural environments and wildlife of Iran, especially via his most popular TV-program, Khandevaneh."			
Ceraleurodicus wire Canty, 2023	Whitefly	Wire	"The species epithet [...] is the name of a seminal art-rock group, Wire, whose members have shown an interest in nature and natural history in their work."			
Cerapus ryanadamsi Drumm, 2018	Crustacean	Ryan Adams	"Named after the author's favorite singer/songwriter, Ryan Adams, whose music has enriched his life over the years."			
Cerapus slayeri Drumm, 2018	Crustacean	Slayer	"Named after the thrash metal band, Slayer, who has a song entitled "Beauty Through Order," which reminds the author of an homage to taxonomy."			
Chayamaritia sirindhorniana D.J.Middleton, Tetsana & Suddee	Flowering plant	Sirindhorn	This species is native to Thailand and is named "in honour of Her Royal Highness Princess Maha Chakri Sirindhorn for her dedication to, and encouragement of, the Flora of Thailand Project."			
Cherax wagenknechtae Lukhaup & Eprilurahman, 2022	Crustacean	Sahra Wagenknecht	"named after Sahra Wagenknecht, an outstanding German left-wing politician, economist, author and publicist. She inspired the first author to fight determinedly for a better and fairer future for us all. This is the best way we know to thank her for her much appreciated service and effort to represent the socially disadvantaged, her fight for freedom, peace and a rare talent to unite morals and politics."			
Chironephthya sirindhornae Imahara et al., 2020	Coral	Sirindhorn	"The specific epithet is named in honor of Her Royal Highness Princess Maha Chakri Sirindhorn of Thailand, who has initiated and implemented the Plant Genetic Conservation Project for maintenance and conservation of biodiversity both on land and in the ocean."			
Chtonobdella tanae Tessler et al., 2016	Leech	Amy Tan	"The species is named for the celebrated author Amy Tan in recognition of her years of support [of the American Museum of Natural History], and whose writings, charm and companionship in the field have been highly valued, as has her provoking much thought about the foibles of fieldwork with Saving Fish from Drowning, her novel that in three instances makes mention of terrestrial leeches." Tan said she was "thrilled to be immortalised" with this naming and jokingly added that she was "now planning my trip to Queensland, Australia, where I hope to take leisurely walks through the jungle, accompanied by a dozen or so of my namesakes feeding on my ankles".			
Cicinnus melgibsoni Herbin & Monzón Sierra, 2015	Moth	Mel Gibson	"This new species is named after Mel Gibson, famous Irish-American actor, film director, producer and screen director, in recognition for his contribution and support to El Mirador project, species discovered during collecting in this archaeological zone."			
Cladomyrma sirindhornae Jaitrong et al., 2013	Ant	Sirindhorn				
Clathria (Axosuberites) hillenburgi Annunziata, Cavalcanti, Santos & Pinheiro, 2019	Sponge	Stephen Hillenburg	Brazilian demosponge species named after Stephen Hillenburg, marine science educator and creator of the famous animated series SpongeBob SquarePants, which also stars a sea sponge.			
Clavus andreolbrichi Fedosov & Puillandre, 2020	Sea snail	André Olbrich				
Clavus kirkhammetti Fedosov & Puillandre, 2020	Sea snail	Kirk Hammett				
Clusia dickinsoniana J. E. Nascim	Flowering plant	Bruce Dickinson				
Cnemaspis jackieii Pal, Mirza, Dsouza & Shanker, 2021	Lizard	Jackie Chan	"The new species was found to be very fast and moved rapidly on rock boulders, sneaking into the smallest crevices to escape when approached, reminiscent of the stunts of Jackie Chan. His many screen characters as an explorer and adventurer have been an inspiration for the authors."			
Cnemaspis purnamai Riyanto, Hamidy, Sidik & Gunalen, 2017	Lizard	Basuki Tjahaja Purnama	This gecko is endemic to Belitung, Indonesia, and named "in dedication to the phenomenal public figure, Basuki Tjahaja Purnama, regent of Belitung Timur Regency from 3 August 2005 until 22 December 2006 and Governor of Jakarta from 19 November 2014 until 9 May 2017, who ran a strong and honest government in these administrative areas."			
Coecobrya sirindhornae Jantarit, Satasook & Deharveng, 2019	Springtail	Sirindhorn	"This species is named to honour Her Royal Highness Princess Maha Chakri Sirindhorn, who is passionately interested in natural history and plays an important role in promoting the conservation of biodiversity and the environment of Thailand."			
Colemanus † Fisher, 2015	Wasp	Ronnie Coleman	A genus of fossil ichneutine wasps from the Paleogene, "Named for bodybuilder Ronnie Coleman, who was famous for his back; referring to the robust and sculptured nature of the mesosomal dorsum."			
Conobregma bradpitti Quicke & Butcher, 2016	Wasp	Brad Pitt	"Named after the senior author's favourite film actor Brad Pitt, whose poster adorned the wall of her laboratory during her doctoral studies."			
Costacopluma nicksabani † Klompmaker et al., 2025	Crustacean	Nick Saban	A fossil crab from the Paleocene of Alabama, USA, described by a group of scientists including some from the University of Alabama, and named "In honor of the legendary American college football coach Nick Saban, who led the University of Alabama team from 2007-2023, winning six national and nine SEC championships with the Crimson Tide. Also, Nick's Kids Foundation has made a tremendous societal impact in Alabama and beyond."			
Cotesia trivaliae Žikić & Shaw, 2024	Wasp	Trivalia	The lead author Vladimir Žikić had been the lead vocalist and songwriter of Trivalia in his youth.			
Crematogaster gryllsi Sharaf & Hita Garcia, 2019	Ant	Bear Grylls	"in honor of Bear Grylls, the survival instructor, in recognition of his remarkable efforts in spreading the culture of survival globally."			
Crikey steveirwini Stanisic, 2009	Snail	Steve Irwin	A species native to Queensland, Australia, named "In memory of the late Steve Irwin, wildlife warrior, environmental educator and Queensland Museum medallist." Genus Crikey was created concurrently, based on "The world famous 'catch-cry' of the 'Crocodile Hunter'"			
Ctenorillo binomio Carpio-Díaz, Bichuette & Campos-Filho, 2023	Crustacean	Binomio de Oro de América	A woodlouse from Colombia, "named after the Vallenata music group "Binomio de Oro", dedicated to its singer and founder Rafael Orozco."			
Cynaeda gigantea cobaini Korb, 2019	Moth	Kurt Cobain	A hairy grass moth from Kyrgyzstan. Originally described as a subspecies of Cynaeda gigantea, and subsequently promoted to species status, as Cynaeda cobaini.			
Cyphaspis buchbergeri † Adrain & Chatterton, 1996	Trilobite	Kelly Buchberger	Thirteen Canadian species were named, in a series of four papers, after members of the Edmonton Oilers team that won the 1990 Stanley Cup (See also species in genera Aulacopleura, Harpidella, Maurotarion, Otarion and Songkania).			
Cyphaspis lowei † Adrain & Chatterton, 1996	Trilobite	Kevin Lowe	Thirteen Canadian species were named, in a series of four papers, after members of the Edmonton Oilers team that won the 1990 Stanley Cup (See also species in genera Aulacopleura, Harpidella, Maurotarion, Otarion and Songkania).			
Cyphaspis mactavishi † Adrain & Chatterton, 1996	Trilobite	Craig MacTavish	Thirteen Canadian species were named, in a series of four papers, after members of the Edmonton Oilers team that won the 1990 Stanley Cup (See also species in genera Aulacopleura, Harpidella, Maurotarion, Otarion and Songkania).			
Cyphaspis munii † Adrain & Chatterton, 1996	Trilobite	Craig Muni	Thirteen Canadian species were named, in a series of four papers, after members of the Edmonton Oilers team that won the 1990 Stanley Cup (See also species in genera Aulacopleura, Harpidella, Maurotarion, Otarion and Songkania).			
Cyphochilus satyarthii Sabatinelli, 2020	Beetle	Kailash Satyarthi	"Kailash Satyarthi was recipient of the 2014 Nobel Peace Prize, founder of multiple social organizations in favor of children's rights in India, from where the new species of Cyphochilus is described."			
Cyphochilus wattanapanit Sabatinelli, 2020	Beetle	Rodjaraeg Wattanapanit	A scarab beetle from Thailand, whose name "refers to Rodjaraeg Wattanapanit the first Thai woman, human rights activist, who was the recipient of the 2016 International Women of Courage Award; she co-founded the nonprofit organization Creating Awareness for Enhanced Democracy (CAFÉ), which encourages the unfettered exchange of thoughts."			
Cystomastacoides sachini Ranjith, 2018	Wasp	Sachin Tendulkar	A species native to India, dedicated "to the 'master blaster', Sachin Ramesh Tendulkar, former Indian cricketer, for making cricket a passion among Indian youngsters."			
Damarchus sirindhornae Kunsete & Warrit, 2025	Spider	Sirindhorn	A mygalomorph spider from Doi Inthanon National Park, Thailand, "named to honor the celebration on the Auspicious Occasion of Her Royal Highness Princess Maha Chakri Sirindhorn's 6th Cycle Birthday Anniversary, April 2nd, 2025."			
Darwinilus sedarisi Chatzimanolis, 2014	Beetle	David Sedaris	Honors Sedaris "as an appreciation for his fascination with the natural world. I spent many hours listening to Mr Sedaris' audiobooks while preparing the specimens and the figures for this and other manuscripts."			
Dasyomyliobatis thomyorkei † Marramà et al., 2023	Ray	Thom Yorke	A fossil species from the Eocene of Monte Bolca, Italy.			
Deltapliomera eppersoni † McAdams, Adrain & Karim, 2018	Trilobite	John Epperson				
Deltapliomera inglei † McAdams, Adrain & Karim, 2018	Trilobite	Lady Bunny	Named after Lady Bunny's birth name, Jon Ingle.			
Deltapliomera heimbergi † McAdams, Adrain & Karim, 2018	Trilobite	Miss Understood	Named after Miss Understood's birth name, Alex Heimberg.			
Dendropsophus manonegra Rivera-Correa & Orrico, 2013	Frog	Mano Negra	A tree frog from Colombia whose "specific name manonegra [...] is Spanish for "black hand" making reference to the unusual black flash colors of the species, especially in the webbing. It is concurrently a tribute to Mano Negra, a rock band of the 80's and 90's. The band was in contact with the nature, culture and society of Colombia through their project "El Expreso del Hielo" (The Train of Ice), a fantastic train ride that crossed Colombia."			
Depressizona exorum Geiger, 2003	Sea snail	The Ex				
Derogenes abba Bouguerche et al., 2024	Fluke	ABBA	A species of trematode parasitic in fish from Scandinavian waters whose name honours "the Swedish pop supergroup renowned for hits like "Dancing Queen", "Chiquitita" and "Money, Money, Money" which served as a source of entertainment for the first author during the creation of the illustrations. The group's name is an acronym of the first letters of their first names arranged as a palindrome."			
Desmopachria barackobamai Makhan, 2015	Beetle	Barack Obama	A diving beetle from French Guiana			
Diamphipnoa colberti Stark, 2008	Stonefly	Stephen Colbert	"I am pleased to honor an entertaining, provocative, former American presidential candidate, Stephen Colbert, of The Colbert Report with this patronym."			
Dicranogmus wynni † Adrain, 2003	Trilobite	Steve Wynn				
Diegoglossidium maradonai Montes et al., 2022	Fluke	Diego Maradona	A parasite of Hoplosternum littorale from La Plata River basin, in Argentina. The genus "is named in honour of Diego Maradona, the greatest Argentinean football player for the joy he brought to people regardless of nationality." The species "is named after Diego Maradona for the reasons mentioned above and for the love he always demonstrated for his country."			
Dietotenhosen † Santelli & del Río, 2019	Bivalve	Die Toten Hosen	A fossil genus of scallop from the Miocene and Pliocene of South America.			
Diolcogaster ichiroi Fernandez-Triana, 2018	Wasp	Ichiro Suzuki	"This unique and remarkable species is named to honor the truly unique and remarkable Ichiro Suzuki, my favorite baseball player and one the best ever to play the game. At the time the research for this paper was being conducted, Ichiro was still playing for a Florida team and thus naming a species endemic from Florida after him made complete sense. Unfortunately, the new owners of the Miami Marlins did not keep Ichiro, an unpopular decision not liked by many Marlins fans. Hopefully soon another Major League team gives the Universal Hit King the chance to continue his extraordinary career in baseball."			
Djupedalia † Knutsen et al., 2012	Plesiosaur	Øystein Djupedal	A plesiosaur from the Jurassic of Svalbard, Norway, named "In honour of Øystein Kåre Djupedal, Norway's Minister of Education and Research from 2005–2007, whose commitment to the Jurassic marine reptile project made the excavations in Svalbard possible."			
Dokimocephalus stewarti † Westrop, Waskiewicz Poole & Adrain, 2010	Trilobite	Jon Stewart				
Dolomedes briangreenei Raven & Hebron, 2018	Spider	Brian Greene	A species of fishing spider from Australia, named "in honour of Professor Brian Greene, world renowned physicist and co-founder of the World Science Festival, to celebrate Professor Greene's contributions to science. Professor Greene is one of the world's leading experts in exploring and explaining the effects of gravitational waves in the universe and the connection was due to the way pisaurids hunt their prey on water using waves and associated vibrations."			
Dravidogecko douglasadamsi Chaitanya et al., 2019	Lizard	Douglas Adams	"The specific epithet is a patronym honouring the English author and satirist, Douglas Noel Adams. Adams was also a renowned environmental activist. His radio documentary on critically endangered animals for the British Broadcasting Corporation (BBC) titled Last Chance to See and its accompanying book influenced the thinking of a whole generation of wildlife biologists. The etymology also alludes to the number '42'—the number of precloacofemoral pores that most specimens of this species possess. The number 42 incidentally is also the answer to the "ultimate question of Life, The Universe and Everything" according to Adams' seminal book The Hitchhiker's Guide to the Galaxy."			
Eadya annleckieae Ridenbaugh, 2018	Wasp	Ann Leckie				
Echiniscus madonnae Michalczyk & Kaczmarek, 2006	Tardigrade	Madonna	"We take great pleasure in dedicating this species to one of the most significant artists of our times, Madonna Louise Veronica Ritchie."; Subsequently transferred to genus Barbaria.			
Echinoderes kathleenhannae Sørensen et al., 2025	Mud dragon	Kathleen Hanna	"dedicated to the musician, artist, activist and rebel girl, Kathleen Hanna."			
Edmundsina reboloi Ortea & Moro, 2020	Sea slug	Rafael Rebolo López	"Dedicated to Dr. Rafael Rebolo López, researcher at the Instituto de Astrofísica de Canarias. In 1995 he discovered the first brown dwarfs in our galaxy. Canary Islands Award for Research 2002." The holotype of this species, collected in Cabo Verde, is deposited in the Museo de la Naturaleza y Arqueología, Tenerife.			
Eldivo Hazzi & Hormiga, 2024	Spider	Juan Gabriel	A genus of Mexican wandering spiders "dedicated to the memory of Alberto Aguilera Valadez, known professionally as Juan Gabriel and colloquially as "El Divo". Juan Gabriel was a Mexican singer and songwriter that was known for his histrionic style, which overcame barriers within the Latin music."			
Elektrogomphaeschna peterthieli † Pinkert, Bechly & Nel, 2017	Dragonfly	Peter Thiel	A fossil species found in Eocene Baltic amber and "Named in honour of Mr. Peter Thiel (San Francisco, USA) for his generous support of the research of the second author."			
Elseya irwini Cann, 1997	Turtle	Steve Irwin	This species, endemic to Queensland, Australia, was first captured on film by conservationist Bob Irwin and his son Steve. When it was finally described seven years later, it was named after Steve Irwin, who in the intervening period had become a celebrity.			
Elysia deborahae Ortea, Caballer, Moro & Espinosa, 2005	Sea slug	Deborah Andollo	A species native to Cuba, named "in honour of the Cuban freediver Deborah Andollo (Havana, 1967), world record holder in free diving, with 74 m depth (!) in 2001."			
Enyalioides binzayedi Venegas et al., 2013	Lizard	Mohamed bin Zayed Al Nahyan	"honoring Sheikh Mohamed bin Zayed Al Nahyan, Crown Prince of Abu Dhabi and Deputy Supreme Commander of the UAE, who created the Mohamed bin Zayed Species Conservation Fund (MBZSCF) to support species conservation projects around the globe. Field surveys leading to the discovery of the two species reported on in this paper were supported by a grant from the MBZSCF."			
Enyalioides dickinsoni Venegas et al., 2024	Lizard	Bruce Dickinson	"honouring Paul Bruce Dickinson (born 7 August 1958), who is best known as the lead singer of the legendary heavy metal band Iron Maiden, though he is also a music producer, entrepreneur, competitive fencer, novelist, aviator, broadcaster and the recipient of numerous honorary degrees and awards. In 2016, he flew a loggerhead sea turtle, Caretta caretta, that washed up on a Jersey beach to the Canary Islands in his private plane, thus contributing to the awareness and protection of this vulnerable species. We also highlight that Iron Maiden is a popular band among taxonomists and museum curators who appreciate rock music."			
Epicratinus temuerai Gonçalves & Brescovit, 2024	Spider	Temuera Morrison	"a patronym in honour of Temuera Derek Morrison in recognition of his work as a "Clone of the Clone Army of the Republic" in George Lucas film, "Star Wars Episode II – The Clone Wars" [sic, the actual title is Star Wars: Episode II – Attack of the Clones]. Temuera lent his face and body to the soldiers of the republic's clone army, as this species resembles Epicratinus pugionifer."			
Episinus bonjovi Lin & Li, 2021	Spider	Bon Jovi	"honoring the American rock band Bon Jovi, composer of the music album Have a Nice Day and the singles "Because We Can" and "Living On A Prayer", which encouraged the author by their songs full of romance and freedom"			
Episinus jiangweni Lin & Li, 2021	Spider	Jiang Wen	A comb-footed spider native to China, "named after the famous director Mr. Wen Jiang, in honor of his tremendous impact on Chinese cinema"			
Eridanula susannaebierae † Fanti & Damgaard, 2018	Beetle	Susanne Bier	A fossil soldier beetle found in Baltic amber from the Eocene of Kaliningrad Oblast, "named in honour of Danish film director Susanne Bier, to thank her for her films and to recognize her for the awards she has earned."			
Eristalis alleni Thompson, 1997	Fly	Paul Allen	"named after Paul Allen, the co-founder of Microsoft, in recognition of his contributions to the PC revolution." On his website, the author also said this species "was named after Paul Allen in recognition of his great contributions to the science of Dipterology."			
Eristalis gatesi Thompson, 1997	Fly	Bill Gates	"named after William Gates III, the co-founder of Microsoft, in recognition of his contributions to the PC revolution." On his website, the author also said this species "was named after Bill Gates in recognition of his great contributions to the science of Dipterology."			
Etheostoma obama Mayden & Layman, 2012	Fish	Barack Obama	The scientific name of the spangled darter, endemic to rivers of Tennessee, honors Obama for "his environmental leadership and commitment during challenging economic times in the areas of clean energy, energy efficiency, environmental protection and humanitarian efforts globally, and especially for the people of the United States."			
Eualebra moralesi Dietrich, 2013	Leafhopper	Evo Morales	This species is native to Bolivia.			
Euastacus binzayedi Coughran & Furse, 2013	Crustacean	Mohamed bin Zayed Al Nahyan	"Named for His Royal Highness the Crown Prince Mohammed bin Zayed of the United Arab Emirates, in acknowledgement of his substantial contributions to conservation of endangered species, through the Mohamed bin Zayed Species Conservation Fund. The Fund supports conservation initiatives for plants and animals throughout the world, and has generously supported recent conservation initiatives for the highly imperiled crayfish genus Euastacus.			
Eucosmogastra sirindhornae Pinkaew & Leadprathom, 2016	Moth	Sirindhorn	A leafroller moth native to Thailand.			
Euthalia zubeengargi Upadhaya & Sadasivan, 2026	Butterfly	Zubeen Garg	This species from Arunachal Pradesh, India, was "named in honour of the celebrated Indian singer and cultural icon Mr. Zubeen Garg, in recognition of his significant contributions to contemporary music in northeast India."			
Euthora timburtonii Clarkston & G.W. Saunders, 2010	Alga	Tim Burton	"Named for Tim Burton, because the alga and its common substrate (polychaete worm tube) together resemble a macabre flower in the style of T. Burton's artistic contributions."			
Eviota santanai Greenfield & Erdmann, 2013	Fish	Nino Konis Santana	A dwarfgoby from East Timor, "named in honor of Connisso Antonino ("Nino Konis") Santana, a national hero in Timor-Leste's struggle for independence who was renowned for his environmental awareness. The type locality of this beautiful goby species is in Tutuala, just offshore of Santana's birthplace, and moreover is located within the Nino Konis Santana National Park."			
Extraordinarius andrematosi Rheims, 2019	Spider	Andre Matos	"The species name honors Andre Coelho Matos (1971–2019), Brazilian singer, composer, maestro and pianist, lead singer for the heavy metal bands Viper, Angra and Shaman. A great guy that left us too soon" (the paper was published three months after Matos's death).			
Extraordinarius angusyoungi Rheims, 2022	Spider	Angus Young	"The species name honors Angus Young, lead guitarist, songwriter and co-founder of the Australian rock band AC/DC. He is best known for his stage schoolboy uniform outfits and energetic performances"			
Extraordinarius brucedickinsoni Rheims, 2019	Spider	Bruce Dickinson	"The specific name honors Bruce Dickinson, singer, writer and airplane pilot, best known for being lead singer of the heavy metal band Iron Maiden."			
Extraordinarius rickalleni Rheims, 2019	Spider	Rick Allen	"The species name honors Rick Allen, drummer for the British rock band Def Leppard, who lost an arm in a car accident but continues to play the drums with an especially adapted drum set."			
Flemingia sirindhorniae Mattapha, Chantar. & Suddee	Legume	Sirindhorn	A species native to Thailand, named "in honour of Her Royal Highness Princess Maha Chakri Sirindhorn of Thailand who has initiated the Plant Genetic Conservation Project under the Royal Initiative of H.R.H. Princess Maha Chakri Sirindhorn." The vernacular name "Thep-pa-mat" (เทพมาศ) was given by the Princess herself.			
Foenatopus nimaarkanii Ghafouri Moghaddam & Rakhshani, 2018	Wasp	Nima Arkani-Hamed	A Stephanid parasitoid wasp native to Iran, "named after Prof. Nima Arkani Hamed from Institute for Advanced Study in Princeton, New Jersey - theoretical physicist with interests in high energy physics, string theory and cosmology - due to authority on some of the new debates of physics."			
Forteyaspis adamanti † Karim & Adrain, 2022	Trilobite	Adam Ant				
Forteyaspis idoli † Karim & Adrain, 2022	Trilobite	Billy Idol				
Fukomys ilariae Gippoliti & Amori, 2011	Rodent	Ilaria Alpi	A rare mole rat from Somalia, "dedicated to Miss Ilaria Alpi, an Italian journalist, who together with her cameraman Miran Hrovatin, was assassinated in Mogadishu in 1994, while investigating trade in toxic cargoes between Italy and Somalia."			
Gammarus stasiuki Jażdżewski, Mamos & Grabowski, 2021	Crustacean	Andrzej Stasiuk	A freshwater amphipod found in streams of the Eastern Carpathians and named "in honour of Andrzej Stasiuk, a very successful and internationally acclaimed Polish writer, journalist and literary critic. By this we pay tribute to his travel literature and essays that describe the natural and cultural environment of Eastern Europe, including the Carpathians, where he has chosen to settle."			
Geotrigona joearroyoi Gonzalez & Engel, 2012	Bee	Joe Arroyo	A stingless bee from the Caribbean region of Colombia, "named in tribute to the late Colombian tropical music singer, composer, and songwriter Alvaro José Arroyo González (1 November 1955–26 July 2011). This artist, also known as Joe Arroyo or El Joe, was nationally and internationally known for his unique way of combining a diverse array of Caribbean music styles, including salsa, cumbia, porro, soca, kompa, and zouk."			
Gibberula betancourtae Ortea, 2015	Sea snail	Ingrid Betancourt	One of 21 sea snails of the genus Gibberula concurrently named after female winners of the Prince of Asturias Awards (see also List of organisms named after famous people (born 1900–1924), List of organisms named after famous people (born 1925–1949) and List of organisms named after famous people (born 1975–present)). (Note: Of the 21 women honoured, 5 are in this section of the list, 3 are in the List of organisms named after famous people (born 1900–1924), 9 are in the List of organisms named after famous people (born 1925–1949), 2 are in the List of organisms named after famous people (born 1975–present) and the remaining two are not listed because they are natural scientists: Jane Goodall (Gibberula goodallae) and Linda R. Watkins (Gibberula watkinsae).) "Named in honour of Colombian politician Ingrid Betancourt (Bogotá, Colombia, 1961), who was awarded the 2008 Prince of Asturias Award for Concord in recognition of her struggle in defence of human rights and against terrorist violence. In the same year she was awarded the French Legion of Honour."			
Gibberula boulmerkae Ortea, 2015	Sea snail	Hassiba Boulmerka	One of 21 sea snails of the genus Gibberula concurrently named after female winners of the Prince of Asturias Awards. "Named in honour of middle-distance runner Hassiba Boulmerka (Constantine, Algeria, 1968), winner of the 1995 Prince of Asturias Award for Sports, winner of her country's first gold medal at the Olympic Games (Barcelona 92) and a tireless fighter for women's rights."			
Gibberula grafae Ortea, 2015	Sea snail	Steffi Graf	One of 21 sea snails of the genus Gibberula concurrently named after female winners of the Prince of Asturias Awards. "Named in honour of tennis player Steffi Graf (Mannheim, Germany, 1969), winner of the 1999 Prince of Asturias Award for Sports, winner of 22 Grand Slam tournaments, including seven at Wimbledon and six at Roland Garros."			
Gibberula navratilovae Ortea, 2015	Sea snail	Martina Navratilova	One of 21 sea snails of the genus Gibberula concurrently named after female winners of the Prince of Asturias Awards. "Named in honour of Czech-born American tennis player Martina Navratilova (Prague, Czech Republic, 1956), distinguished in 1994 with the Prince of Asturias Award for Sports, number one in the women's world ranking (1982-87) and winner of tournaments such as Wimbledon, eight times, and Roland Garros, twice."			
Gibberula rowlingae Ortea, 2015	Sea snail	J. K. Rowling	One of 21 sea snails of the genus Gibberula concurrently named after female winners of the Prince of Asturias Awards. "Named in honour of British writer Joanne Rowling (Yate, 1965), winner of the 2003 Prince of Asturias Award for Concord, creator of the Harry Potter book series, a literary phenomenon with more than 500 million copies sold."			
Gigagryllus omayrae Cadena-Castañeda & García García, 2020	Cricket	Omayra Sánchez	"a new genus of giant field cricket, from the middle Magdalena of Colombia, more precisely from the department of Tolima, in the region of the Armero tragedy, for which this species is dedicated to the memory of Omayra Sánchez" "Dedicated to the memory of Omayra Sánchez (1972–1985), a symbol of the most devastating natural tragedy in Colombia, a victim of the eruption of the Nevado del Ruiz volcano in 1985. She gained worldwide recognition by being trapped in the mud and remains of her own home for three days until her death."			
Gladiatoria crowei † Adrain, McAdams & Westrop 2011	Trilobite	Russell Crowe	Five trilobites of the genus Gladiatoria were concurrently named after cast members of the 2000 film Gladiator (see also List of organisms named after famous people (born 1925–1949)).			
Gladiatoria nielsenae † Adrain, McAdams & Westrop 2011	Trilobite	Connie Nielsen	Five trilobites of the genus Gladiatoria were concurrently named after cast members of the 2000 film Gladiator (see also List of organisms named after famous people (born 1925–1949)).			
Gladiatoria phoenixi † Adrain, McAdams & Westrop 2011	Trilobite	Joaquin Phoenix	Five trilobites of the genus Gladiatoria were concurrently named after cast members of the 2000 film Gladiator (see also List of organisms named after famous people (born 1925–1949)).			
Gladiopycnodus byrnei † Marramà, Villier, Dalla Vecchia & Carnevale, 2016	Fish	David Byrne	A fossil Pycnodont from the Cretaceous of Lebanon.			
Glyptothorax alidaeii Mousavi-Sabet, Eagderi, Vatandoust & Freyhof, 2021	Catfish	Ali Daei	"in honor of Ali Daei, due to his humanitarian activities after the 2018 earthquake in region, where the Seymareh River (type locality of G. alidaeii) is located."			
Goloboffia megadeth Ferretti, Ríos-Tamayo & Goloboff, 2019	Spider	Megadeth				
Grouvellinus andrekuipersi Freitag, Pangantihon & Njunjić, 2018	Beetle	André Kuipers	"named after the Dutch astronaut André Kuipers in recognition of his engagement against the loss of the planet's natural resources and his ambassadorship for various entomological organizations. The name was elected in an online public contest organized by the science program De Kennis van Nu of the Dutch public broadcaster NTR."			
Grouvellinus leonardodicaprioi Freitag, Pangantihon & Njunjić, 2018	Beetle	Leonardo DiCaprio	"named in honour of the actor Leonardo DiCaprio to acknowledge his inspiring work in promoting environmental awareness and bringing the problems of climate change and biodiversity loss into the spotlight. The species name was selected during a naming ceremony at Maliau Basin Studies Centre on 6 October 2017, in which expedition participants as well as a large number of field centre staff and porters took part."			
Habroichthys nietorum † Conedera et al., 2025	Fish	Niet	A fossil fish from the Triassic of Slovenia, "Named in tribute to the influential Slovenian punk rock band "Niet". It reflects both the context in which it was discovered – a mass mortality bed – and a reference to Niet's well-known song and album Lep dan za smrt (meaning 'A good day to die')."			
Hannia wintoni Shelley et al., 2020	Fish	Tim Winton	A freshwater grunter found in rivers of the Kimberley (Western Australia), named "in honour of Western Australian author and Kimberley conservationist Tim Winton, whose many novels espouse a love of fish and the Australian landscape"			
Hantzschia tokarczukiana M.Rybak, Kochman-Kędziora	Diatom	Olga Tokarczuk	A species from Seram Island, Indonesia, described by scientists from the University of Rzeszów and "named after Polish writer, laureate of the 2018 Nobel Prize in Literature Olga Tokarczuk to honour her work."			
Harpidella greggi † Adrain & Chatterton, 1995	Trilobite	Randy Gregg	Thirteen Canadian species were named, in a series of four papers, after members of the Edmonton Oilers team that won the 1990 Stanley Cup (See also species in genera Aulacopleura, Cyphaspis, Maurotarion, Otarion and Songkania).			
Harpidella kurrii † Adrain & Chatterton, 1995	Trilobite	Jari Kurri	Thirteen Canadian species were named, in a series of four papers, after members of the Edmonton Oilers team that won the 1990 Stanley Cup (See also species in genera Aulacopleura, Cyphaspis, Maurotarion, Otarion and Songkania).			
Harpidella tikkaneni † Adrain & Chatterton, 1995	Trilobite	Esa Tikkanen	Thirteen Canadian species were named, in a series of four papers, after members of the Edmonton Oilers team that won the 1990 Stanley Cup (See also species in genera Aulacopleura, Cyphaspis, Maurotarion, Otarion and Songkania).			
Heckethornia ballionae † McAdams & Adrain, 2009	Trilobite	Siouxsie Sioux	Named after Sioux's birth name, Susan Ballion.			
Heckethornia hyndeae † McAdams & Adrain, 2009	Trilobite	Chrissie Hynde				
Heckethornia morrisseyi † McAdams & Adrain, 2009	Trilobite	Steven Morrissey				
Heckethornia numani † McAdams & Adrain, 2009	Trilobite	Gary Numan				
Heckethornia smithi † McAdams & Adrain, 2009	Trilobite	Robert Smith				
Hedychium zubeengargianum D.K.Roy, R.Lytan & N.Odyuo	Flowering plant	Zubeen Garg	"The specific epithet honours Zubeen Garg, Hon. D.Litt., the late legendary Assamese cultural icon, artist, and filmmaker, in recognition of his decades of cultural contribution to India and his vocal advocacy for nature conservation."			
Hellinsia diana Ustjuzhanin & Kovtunovich, 2021	Moth	Diana, Princess of Wales	"The species is named in memory of Diana, the Princess of Wales, a humanist, well-known benefactor, generous and sympathetic woman, the Queen of human hearts (1961−1997)."			
Henosepilachna frusciantei Szawaryn, 2012	Beetle	John Frusciante	"The species is named after one of my favourite musicians – John Frusciante. His music inspires me significantly and always accompanies my research."			
Heterachthes caceresae Santos-Silva, Van Roie & Jocqué, 2021	Beetle	Berta Cáceres	A longhorn beetle from Honduras "named after Berta Isabel Cáceres Flores (Berta Cáceres for short) who supported indigenous communities and was an active opponent of illegal logging and mass plantations. She was murdered at her home in March 2016."			
Heteragrion johndeaconi Lencioni, 2013	Damselfly	John Deacon	One of four Heteragrion species named after members of the band Queen (see also List of organisms named after famous people (born 1925–1949)).			
Heteromysis fosteri Wittmann & Griffiths, 2017	Crustacean	Craig Foster	An opossum shrimp from South Africa, "named after well-know [sic] underwater-photographer and diver Craig Foster, who has accompanied and assisted the second author in many collecting expeditions and who made all in situ photographs and sampled all specimens of [...] this species"			
Heteropoda helge Jäger, 2008	Spider	Helge Schneider	"in honour of Helge Schneider, a German comedian, for revolutionising the comedy scene"			
Heteropoda ninahagen Jäger, 2008	Spider	Nina Hagen	"named after the German rock- and punk singer Nina hagen, who inspired the author with her unique songs and texts over many years, which were as unusual as the shape of the RTA [Retrolateral tibial apophysis] in this new species"			
Heteropoda richlingi Jäger, 2008	Spider	Mathias Richling	"in honour of the German cabaret artist Mathias Richling for observing and commenting politicians in Germany and his tremendous sagacious neologisms"			
Holostaspis mooni Keum, Jung & Joharchi, 2017	Mite	Moon Jae-in	"This species is named after Mr Moon Jae-in, the President of the Republic of Korea, in recognition of his invaluable movements seeking to improve and protect natural environments and wildlife in the Republic of Korea" (which this species is native to).			
Hortipes wimmertensi Bosselaers & Jocqué, 2000	Spider	Wim Mertens	"in honor of the Flemish composer Wim Mertens, protagonist of the European romantic minimalist school."			
Hydrolagus trolli Didier & Séret, 2002	Chimaera	Ray Troll	"Named for Ray Troll, an artist of fishes, and one of the few true chimaeroid lovers of the world. This fish is named in his honor for his valiant efforts to increase ratfish awareness worldwide."			
Hyla stingi Kaplan, 1994	Frog	Sting	Colombian tree frog named after Sting "for his commitment and efforts to save the rain forest." Subsequently transferred to genus Dendropsophus.			
Hyloscirtus sethmacfarlanei Reyes-Puig et al., 2022	Frog	Seth MacFarlane	"in honor of Seth MacFarlane, American writer, director, producer, actor, artist, musician and conservationist, with an outstanding passion for science, biodiversity and the natural world."			
Hypotrachyna oprah Lendemer & J.L.Allen (2019)	Lichen	Oprah Winfrey	A foliose lichen native to the Southeastern United States. "The specific epithet was chosen to honor Dr. Oprah Winfrey for her performances, media presence, and generous philanthropy that have substantially improved humanity." "The new species honors Dr. Oprah Winfrey, widely considered to be the world's most influential woman, to commemorate her lifelong accomplishments and contributions in the realms of media and philanthropy."			
Hystricurus zanderi † Adrain, Westrop, Karim & Landing 2014	Trilobite	Robin Zander				
Ibexaspis leuppi † McAdams, Adrain & Karim, 2018	Trilobite	Miss Coco Peru	Named after Peru's birth name, Clinton Leupp.			
Ibexaspis rupauli † McAdams, Adrain & Karim, 2018	Trilobite	RuPaul				
Icius tukarami Prajapati, Kumbhar & Kamboj, 2021	Spider	Tukaram Omble	A jumping spider native to India, "dedicated to a hero of the 26/11 Mumbai terror attack, ASI Tukaram Omble AC, who took 23 bullets and captured the terrorist of the attack."			
Icius vikrambatrai Prajapati, Malamel, Sudhikumar & Sebastian, 2018	Spider	Vikram Batra	A jumping spider native to India, named in tribute "to the Indian Kargil war hero, Captain Vikram Batra, PVC, an officer of the Indian Army. He was posthumously awarded with the Param Vir Chakra (India's highest and most prestigious award for valour) for his tremendous actions during the 1999 Kargil War in Kashmir, for which he was also known as 'Sher Shah' ('Lion King')."			
Idris elba Talamas, 2019	Wasp	Idris Elba	In explaining the etymology of the name, the authors merely wrote: "The epithet 'elba' is an arbitrary combination of letters that is to be treated as a noun in apposition." In a statement, Talamas elaborated on the choice, noting that were the species to be explicitly named after Idris Elba, it would then be a patronym, and thus, following Latin grammar rules, the wasp would have to be called Idris elbai. Treating the specific epithet as merely "an arbitrary combination of letters", however, avoided this grammar issue. Talamas also said that this wasp "might prove to be a Heimdall-like "protector" for many crops", because it parasitises the eggs of the painted bug, Bagrada hilaris, which is considered a major pest in North America. Elba plays Heimdall, protector of the Bifröst bridge, in the Marvel Cinematic Universe.	A brown wasp with white wings		
Impatiens dorjeekhandui Chowlu, S. S. Dash & Gogoi	Flowering plant	Dorjee Khandu	A balsamine native to the Eastern Himalayas, named "after Late Dorjee Khandu, former Chief Minister of Arunachal Pradesh for his service to the nation and contribution for better development in the Himalayan state."			
Impatiens shailajae Sindhu Arya & V.S.A Kumar	Flowering plant	K. K. Shailaja	A balsamine native to Kerala, India, "eponymous to Mrs. K.K. Shailaja, former Health Minister of Kerala, honoring her efforts to tackle various epidemic and pandemic situations in the state of Kerala through scientific temper."			
Impatiens sirindhorniae Triboun & Suksathan	Flowering plant	Sirindhorn	A balsamine native to Thailand, named "in honour of Her Royal Highness Princess Sirindhorn for her dedication and encouragement to the environmental sciences and biodiversity conservation in Thailand."			
Indirana tysoni Dahanukar et al., 2016	Frog	Neil deGrasse Tyson	"The species is named after the famous Dr. Neil deGrasse Tyson, Director of the Hayden Planetarium in New York, for his effective, innovative, witty and entertaining contributions to popularizing and communicating science to the general public."			
Kahlerosphaera pamuki † Kozur, Moix & Ozsvárt, 2007	Protist	Orhan Pamuk	A fossil radiolarian from the Triassic of Turkey.			
Karaops pilkingtoni Crews & Harvey, 2011	Spider	Karl Pilkington				
Kerevata clarksoni Butcher & Quicke, 2014	Wasp	Jeremy Clarkson	Three species in this genus were named concurrently after the hosts of Top Gear			
Kerevata hammondi Butcher & Quicke, 2014	Wasp	Richard Hammond	Three species in this genus were named concurrently after the hosts of Top Gear			
Kerevata jamesmayi Butcher & Quicke, 2014	Wasp	James May	Three species in this genus were named concurrently after the hosts of Top Gear			
Kettneraspis dickinsoni † Viersen, Lerouge & Kesselaer, 2025	Trilobite	Bruce Dickinson				
Kingnites diamondi † Eriksson et al., 2012	Polychaete worm	King Diamond	A fossil annelid worm from the Silurian of Baltoscandia. "Named [...] after King Diamond for musical inspiration during the course of this study."			
Kirchnerala † Petrulevicius & Gutiérrez, 2016	Dragonfly	Néstor Kirchner	A fossil Odonatoptera from the Carboniferous of La Rioja Province, Argentina, named "in honour of Argentinean President (2003–2007) Néstor Kirchner, who passed away on October 27th, 2010 and the Latin "ala" meaning wing. On July 16, 2003, he agreed to a public meeting requested by two designed delegates of CONICET External Postdoctoral Fellows in the Argentinean Embassy in Paris. In relation to our concerns, he explained us the promissory future plans of the government for the scientific system in our country. After our return to Argentina in 2004, his sayings were corroborated year by year and continued in the same way by the next (twice) President of the country, Cristina Fernández de Kirchner."; The type species is named Kirchnerala treintamil, "Dedicated to the 30,000, in Spanish "treinta mil" (presentes, ahora y siempre!), detained [or] disappeared by the Argentinean Military-Civil-Ecclesiastic Dictatorship 1976–1983. Mil is also a linguistic morph in Kakán (Diaguita) language from La Rioja province whose meaning has unfortunately disappeared".			
Kochosa timwintoni Framenau, Castanheira & Yoo, 2023	Spider	Tim Winton	A wolf spider from Western Australia, named "honouring the Western Australian author Tim Winton for his ongoing environmental advocacy [...]. His novels have given the senior author hours of pleasure and time of reflection."			
Kootenichela deppi † Legg, 2013	Early Arthropod	Johnny Depp	An early arthropod from the Cambrian period. It was named after Depp for his role in Edward Scissorhands, because of the shape of its claws.			
Ktarius patrickbrueli Hamdi et al., 2024	Flatworm	Patrick Bruel	A marine parasite of the pink dentex, collected off the coast of Tunisia, and "named after Patrick Bruel, the French singer-songwriter renowned for his nostalgic song "Au Café des Délices" which evokes Mediterranean charm of Tunisia and a sense of nostalgia."			
Lanice kellyslateri Lavesque, Daffe, Londoño-Mesa & Hutchings, 2021	Polychaete worm	Kelly Slater	"This species is named after the "King" Kelly Slater, 11-time Surf World Champion, and also an environmental activist for the protection of the oceans."			
Lapidaster coreytaylori † Thuy, 2013	Brittle star	Corey Taylor	A fossil species from the Cretaceous of Southern France, "named in honour of Corey Taylor, lead vocalist of the rockgroup Slipknot and Stone Sour, for lending a powerful voice during moments of despair in the course of the present study." The genus Lapidaster, created concurrently, is "composed of lapis, Latin for "rock", and aster, Greek for "star", in reference to three species of the genus being named after rockstars."			
Lapidaster hystricarboris † Thuy, 2013	Brittle star	Porcupine Tree	A fossil species from the Jurassic of England; "Name derived from Hystrix, a genus of porcupine, and arbor, Latin for "tree", in honour of Steven Wilson, Richard Barbieri, Gavin Harrison and Colin Edwin of Porcupine Tree whose music was a fertile source of inspiration whenever the creative process of the present study threatened to come to a halt."			
Lapidaster mastodon † Thuy, 2013	Brittle star	Mastodon	A fossil species from the Jurassic of Southern Germany, "named in honour of Brent Hinds, Brann Dailor, Bill Kelliher and Troy Sanders of the rockgroup Mastodon, whose music was indispensable during lengthy nightly sessions at the scanning electron microscope."			
Laqueichnus baloffi † Kappel, 2003	Crustacean trace fossil	Paul Baloff	An ichnospecies identified from the Cretaceous of Germany.			
Lasioglossum obamai Genaro, 2016	Bee	Barack Obama	"Species dedicated to the forty-fourth president of the United States of America, Barack Obama, for his contribution to the conservation of the environment (and native pollinators) and the improvement in relations with Cuba, among other progressive policies and reforms carried out by his administration."			
Lavajatus moroi Simone, 2018	Snail	Sergio Moro	The generic name Lavajatus, created concurrently, "is a Latinization of the Portuguese words Lava Jato (car wash), an allusion to the Lava-Jato Operation, which designates a conjunct of investigations of [the] Federal Police of Brazil, mostly investigating corruption crimes. The translucency of the shell, revealing the occult inner structures, is an afflatus." "The specific epithet is in honor to the judge Sergio Fernando Moro, professor of criminal law in [the] Federal University of Paraná, who is leading Lava-Jato Operation referred above. This is a demure acknowledge[ment] of his effort in remodeling Brazil into a better country."			
Lecanora indigoana E. Tripp & J. Watts	Lichen	Indigo Girls	"in honor of Indigo Girls, a now five-decade musical duo and legend that has inspired millions of listeners with their lyrical contributions, commitment to environmental protection, and social activism. Emily Saliers and Amy Ray of Indigo Girls have been major proponents of climate justice and, for years, led grassroots-style campaigns to increase awareness and promote change in social atmospheres. Songs by Indigo Girls have universally conveyed an interconnectedness between environmental health and social rights, which reminds us of lichen biodiversity and our parallel need to continue advancing initiatives that promote education and awareness of these remarkable symbiotic organisms. The new species further reminds us of Indigo Girls because it is both lustrous and assertive, introspective yet audacious, and reflective of voices that have not yet been heard, until now."			
Lemureops kilbeyi † McAdams & Adrain, 2009	Trilobite	Steve Kilbey	Four species in this genus were concurrently named after the members of the 1981–1990 line-up of The Church.			
Lemureops koppesi † McAdams & Adrain, 2009	Trilobite	Peter Koppes	Four species in this genus were concurrently named after the members of the 1981–1990 line-up of The Church.			
Lemureops ploogi † McAdams & Adrain, 2009	Trilobite	Richard Ploog	Four species in this genus were concurrently named after the members of the 1981–1990 line-up of The Church.			
Lemureops willsonpiperi † McAdams & Adrain, 2009	Trilobite	Marty Willson-Piper	Four species in this genus were concurrently named after the members of the 1981–1990 line-up of The Church.			
Leonaspis burketti † Viersen, Lerouge & Kesselaer, 2025	Trilobite	Mike Burkett				
Leonaspis chancellori † Viersen, Lerouge & Kesselaer, 2025	Trilobite	Justin Chancellor				
Lepanthes dianauribeana Gal.-Tar., J.S. Moreno, Zuluaga & Sierra-Ariza	Orchid	Diana Uribe	This species is native to Colombia and "is named in honor of Diana Uribe Forero, a Colombian historian and philosopher, who has contributed immensely to the enrichment of historical and philosophical discourse through her insightful radio broadcasts and podcasts. Her dedication to weaving intricate narratives that bridge historical events with contemporary issues has fostered a deeper understanding and appreciation for the diverse cultural and historical landscapes that shape our world today."			
Lepanthes laurarestrepoana J.S. Moreno, Gal.-Tar. & Sierra-Ariza	Orchid	Laura Restrepo	This species is native to Colombia and its name "honors Laura Restrepo Durán, a renowned Colombian writer and journalist. As a prominent female figure in the literary world, she has not only carved a successful career, but has also been a potent voice in advocating for political activism. her work often transcends the realm of literature, reflecting her profound commitment to addressing various political and social conflicts that have occurred in Colombia and throughout Latin America. In addition to her literary endeavors, Laura has stood as a fervent defender of human rights, collaborating with several non-governmental organizations and groups dedicated to the promotion of human rights."			
Leporinus enyae Burns et al., 2017	Fish	Enya	"Named in honor of the singer Enya, whose beautiful song "Orinoco Flow" celebrates the flow of the mighty Orinoco River, which the new species inhabits"			
Lepraria saliersiae E. Tripp & J. Watts	Lichen	Emily Saliers	"named in honor of Emily Saliers of the long-time musical duo, Indigo Girls. Together with Amy Ray, Emily has worked tirelessly to advocate for environmental rights and to end destructive, industrial practices that are catastrophic to both biodiversity and human livelihood. She has been a vocal opponent of (and has helped to fundraise against) the Dakota Access, Keystone, and Enbridge Pipelines, which devastate river water quality, violate treaty rights of Native Nations, and pose major threats to riparian ecosystems and the peoples that depend on them. [...] Her songs have been a powerful catalyst to inspire social change, which is intimately linked and crucial to the preservation of our native ecosystems and their resident species. Emily's music has kept us company over many years of fieldwork (and microscopy!) spent documenting and conserving the biodiversity that surrounds us. This new species reminds us of Emily because its striking yellow thallus is bright, lively, and conveys a warmness."			
Leptodontidium viktortsoii V.A. Iliushin & I.Y. Kirtsideli (2025)	Fungus	Viktor Tsoi	This species is native to forest-tundra soils of the Russian Far East and was described by scientists of the Komarov Botanical Institute in Saint Petersburg.			
Leptogenys grohli Hamer, Lee & Guénard, 2024	Ant	Dave Grohl	"Named after the musician Dave Grohl, lead singer, guitarist, and songwriter of the rock band Foo Fighters, drummer of the rock bands Nirvana and Queens of the Stone Age among others, for his positive activism, and ever long musical accompaniment to both first and last author."			
Librelula maradoniana † Petrulevičius, 2020	Damselfly	Diego Maradona	A fossil species from the Palaeocene of Jujuy Province, Argentina, named "in honour [of] Diego Armando Maradona (El Diego) the best world football player ever. In [the] 1986 FIFA World Cup, Maradona, the "People's football player", redefined football in less than five minutes, first with the "hand of God" goal and then with "the Goal of the Century", [narrated] exquisitely by Víctor Hugo Morales. In [the] words of Emir Kusturica "that match was maybe the first and the last time that there was justice in the world". He inspired the people and many popular artistic expressions via his Maradonian way." The author sent the paper for publication one month before Maradona's sudden death; it was published the day after the footballer's demise.			
Lielaphis slashi Huang et al., 2026	Snake	Slash	"The species epithet is a patronym to honor Mr. Saul Hudson, known popularly and professionally as the musician 'Slash,' in recognition for his life-long support of museums and zoos, and especially for his love of snakes. Slash has frequently promoted and acted as an advocate for snakes across various media outlets over many years. Senior author SR also credits much of her scientific writing as having occurred while listening to Slash's music, including that of Slash's Snakepit, Guns N' Roses, and Velvet Revolver."			
Liladownsia Fontana, Mariño-Pérez, Woller & Song, 2014	Grasshopper	Lila Downs	"We are pleased to name the new genus in honor of the Mexican singer-songwriter and Grammy Award-winner, Ana Lila Downs Sánchez, whose stage name is Lila Downs. This taxon is dedicated to her for a number of reasons, such as the fact that she was born in the vicinity of the type locality and because she incorporates several indigenous tongues from Mexico into her musical style, including Mixteco and Zapoteco (the latter of which is spoken in the type locality). Additionally, Lila Downs has not only promoted the vast cultural diversity of Mexico worldwide via her music, but also through the use of bright colors, a staple of Mexican culture, and considering that this new genus is brightly-colored, we would like to recognize her efforts through the dedication of this new genus."			
Liptena chrislowei Sáfián, 2021	Butterfly	Chris Lowe	"All newly described species are dedicated to recognise the artistic work of one of the most influential British pop duos, Pet Shop Boys, who always played an important role in the author's life since 1986 and inspired him in various ways." "The species carries the name of Christopher Sean Lowe, keyboardist, programmer and also occasional songwriter and singer of Pet Shop Boys. His unique musical skills, often extravagant and sometimes eccentric appearance cover a humble and deep personality, which had often influenced the image of Pet Shop Boys."			
Liptena neiltennanti Sáfián, 2021	Butterfly	Neil Tennant	"All newly described species are dedicated to recognise the artistic work of one of the most influential British pop duos, Pet Shop Boys, who always played an important role in the author's life since 1986 and inspired him in various ways." "The species carries the name of Neil Francis Tennant, songwriter and lead singer of Pet Shop Boys as a tribute to his talent and lifetime enthusiasm to music." Other species described in the same paper were named L. introspectionem, after the 1988 Pet Shop Boys album Introspective, and L. minimis, after their 2006 song "Minimal".			
Litarachna lopezae Pešić, Chatterjee, Alfaro & Schizas, 2014	Mite	Jennifer Lopez	An aquatic mite from Puerto Rico. "The reason behind the unusual choice of name for the new species is simple: J-Lo's songs and videos kept the team in a continuous good mood when writing the manuscript and watching World Cup soccer," said lead author Vladimir Pešić.			
Liturgusa krattorum Svenson, 2014	Mantis	Kratt brothers	Named for the "hosts and creators of Kratts' Creatures and Wild Kratts... which provide children with entertaining programming focused on animal biology presented with accurate information."			
Locomius † Ferratges, Artal, van Bakel & Zamora, 2025	Crustacean	Locomía	A genus of fossil crabs from the Eocene of Spain; "The name refers to its fan shape, which calls to mind the 1980s pop music group 'Locomia'". (Locomía were famous for twirling large hand fans in their performances.)			
Loureedia phoenixi Zamani & Marusik, 2020	Spider	Joaquin Phoenix	"The new species is named after the American actor, producer and animal rights activist Joaquin Phoenix in recognition of his praised portrayal of the title character in the 2019 movie "Joker" and as a reference to the male abdominal pattern of the new species, which resembles the famous facial makeup of this character."			
Loxosomatoides sirindhornae Wood, 2005	Entoproct	Sirindhorn	A freshwater species from rivers in central Thailand; its name "honors Her Royal Highness Princess Maha Chakri Sirindhorn, who maintains a strong interest in the biological diversity of Thailand."			
Lycodon irwini Naveen, Mirza, Choure & Chandramouli, 2025	Snake	Steve Irwin	"The specific epithet is a patronym honouring the late Stephen Robert Irwin [...], the renowned Australian zookeeper, conservationist, television personality, and wildlife educator. His passion and dedication to wildlife education and conservation have inspired naturalists and conservationists worldwide, including the authors of this paper."			
Lycopale mendozai Montoya, 2024	Fly	Mario Mendoza Zambrano	A hoverfly native to Colombia and named "in honor of the Colombian writer, Mario Mendoza Zambrano, one of the greatest exponents of the new Latin-American narrative. [...] The dark colors and yellow tints of the new species evoke the magnificent black mood and colored sarcasm that is highlighted in the stories of his dark, gloomy, mysterious, and enigmatic characters. This beautiful flower fly species that inhabits the Colombian pristine forest and Páramo ecosystems was named after him in gratitude and recognition of his legacy for future generations."			
Lycopale radioheadi Montoya, 2024	Fly	Radiohead	"in honor of the English rock band Radiohead (formed in 1985), for their extraordinary music, considered one of the most influential bands in contemporary alternative rock. Radiohead is an environmental activist band that raises awareness of climate change and socio-political issues. Their melodies were a source of inspiration and an excellent company while conducting this study."			
Lydonia † Pasinetti et al., 2025	Ediacaran biota	John Lydon (aka Johnny Rotten)	A fossil genus from the Ediacaran of Canada "Named for the punk rock legend John Lydon, with whom this taxon is considered to have shared a spiky "hairstyle"."			
Mackenziurus ceejayi † Adrain & Edgecombe, 1997	Trilobite	C. J. Ramone	Four species in this genus were concurrently named in 1997 after members of The Ramones (see also List of organisms named after famous people (born 1925–1949))			
Mackenziurus deedeei † Adrain & Edgecombe, 1997	Trilobite	Dee Dee Ramone	Four species in this genus were concurrently named in 1997 after members of The Ramones (see also List of organisms named after famous people (born 1925–1949))			
Mackenziurus joeyi † Adrain & Edgecombe, 1997	Trilobite	Joey Ramone	Four species in this genus were concurrently named in 1997 after members of The Ramones (see also List of organisms named after famous people (born 1925–1949))			
Macrobrachium irwini Kunjulakshmi, Santos & Prakash, 2022	Crustacean	Steve Irwin and his family	"honoured in the name of Stephen Robert Irwin (also Steve Irwin), nicknamed 'The Crocodile Hunter'. The 'irwini' has also been dedicated to his entire family members Terri Irwin (Wife), Robert Irwin (Son), Bindi Irwin (Daughter), Candler Powell [sic] (Son in law) and Gracy Warrior [sic] (Grand Daughter) for being an inspiration for nature enthusiasts through multitasking role as zookeeper, conservationist, television personality and wildlife photographer. Overall, we would like to dedicate the new species to Irwin's family efforts in continuing Steve Irwin's mission of "Conservation Through Exciting Education" in Australia Zoo, Queensland."			
Macrobrachium sirindhorn Naiyanetr, 2001	Crustacean	Sirindhorn	"The specific name is given in honour of Her Royal Highness Princess Maha Chakri Sirindhorn, as a token of recognition of Her great interest in the study of the natural history of Thailand. Her Royal Highness graciously permitted the use of Her name for this interesting species."			
Macrocarpaea dies-viridis J.R. Grant	Flowering plant	Green Day	"from the Latin "dies," day, and "viridis," green, for the American punk-rock music group Green Day, whose music we listened to, especially while driving to localities throughout Ecuador during our 2006 expedition."			
Macrocentrus jonathanrosenbergi Sharkey & van Achterberg, 2021	Wasp	Jonathan Rosenberg	"named to honor Mr. Jonathan Rosenberg of Google for his generous perception of the potential relevance of ACG [ Área de Conservación Guanacaste, where this species was found] to biodiversity understanding of Google employees."			
Macrostylis metallicola Riehl & De Smet, 2020	Crustacean	Metallica	"dedicated to the U.S. thrash metal pioneers Metallica whose works accompanied and inspired the first author since teenage years. As a composite word from the Latin word for 'metal' and the New Latin suffix '-cola', meaning 'inhabiting' or 'living in', the name simultaneously refers to the species' habitat that is rich in polymetallic nodules (manganese nodules). It is meant to raise attention to the habitat of this new species which, sad but true, may be partially lost or damaged due to nodule mining in the near future potentially putting the new species under threat." The band commented on their Facebook page "First of all, stellar name Dr. Riehl. Second, what an honor! Not only did Dr. Riehn [sic] name his discovery after a band as he has been a fan since childhood, The Thing That Should Not Be has a few things in common with us. The worm-like creature dwells in complete darkness, has no eyes, and is colorless. Talk about Blackened! It also lives amongst metallic nodules containing cobalt, copper, manganese, nickel, and rare-earth elements. So it basically lives in a rock stadium? Now that's one metal crustacean! You just never know what you'll find "lurking beneath the sea.""			
Magnolia lopezobradorii A.Vázquez	Flowering plant	Andrés Manuel López Obrador	A rare species of magnolia known only from the Tuxtlas Mountains in Veracruz, Mexico; "The specific epithet honors Andrés Manuel López Obrador, a progressive politician and second time Mexican Presidential Candidate [at the time of naming; he would go on to become president], a scholar of the "deep" problems of Mexico, "El México profundo", with sound proposals for sustainable management for tropical rainforest, from where he and this tree species are native. A magnificent tree of the family Magnoliaceae is named after a magnificent philanthropic man."			
Magnolia sirindhorniae Noot. & Chalermglin	Flowering plant	Sirindhorn	This species is native to Thailand. "The second author gratefully acknowledges the grant received from H. R. H. Princess Maha Chakri Sirindhorn, in whose honour the new species was named."			
Maldybulakia angusi † Edgecombe, 1998	Myriapod	Angus Young	A fossil species from the Devonian of Australia.			
Maldybulakia malcolmi † Edgecombe, 1998	Myriapod	Malcolm Young	A fossil species from the Devonian of Australia.			
Marengo sachintendulkar Malamel, Prajapati, Sudhikumar & Sebastian, 2019	Spider	Sachin Tendulkar	A jumping spider native to India, "dedicated to the Indian cricketer Bharat Ratna Sachin Tendulkar, also known as the 'God of Cricket' and 'Master Blaster', for his extraordinary and unbreakable records in the game of cricket."			
Mauriciosaurus fernandezi † Frey et al., 2017	Plesiosaur	Mauricio Fernández Garza	A plesiosaur from the Cretaceous of Vallecillo, Mexico; "Genus and species name in honor of Mauricio Fernández Garza, who not only made the specimen accessible for scientific research, but also secures all future work in the quarry area at Vallecillo and supports public education in Earth- and biological sciences predominantly in the state of Nuevo León."			
Maurotarion messieri † Adrain & Chatterton, 1995	Trilobite	Mark Messier	Thirteen Canadian species were named, in a series of four papers, after members of the Edmonton Oilers team that won the 1990 Stanley Cup (See also species in genera Aulacopleura, Cyphaspis, Harpidella, Otarion and Songkania).			
Mecodema genesispotini Seldon & Buckley, 2019	Beetle	Genesis Potini	"This species is named in honour of the late Genesis Potini, who was a New Zealand speed chess champion from Gisborne. He was also the cofounder of the Gisborne Eastern Knights Chess Club, helping underprivileged Māori children by teaching them how to play chess." The genus Mecodema is endemic to New Zealand, and this species is native to Waimata Valley in Gisborne District.			
Megophthalmidia mckibbeni Kerr, 2014	Fly	Bill McKibben	A fungus gnat native to California, named "in honor of William Earnest "Bill" McKibben, noted author, environmental activist, and founder of 350.org. The magnificent diversity of life on our planet depends on a stable climate, which is now under grave threat. There are solutions, but they require the wisdom, persistence, and activism that Bill McKibben exemplifies." McKibben said "I felt truly honored. I love this planet we got born onto, from the big down to the very small. To be officially connected with its great diversity – well, that means a lot.[...] I was born in California, and my father was a member of the Sierra Club back when it was mostly a hiking group, spending his weekends in the mountains and forests, so I feel some extra kinship."			
Melanochlamys droupadi Tudu & Sajan, 2024	Sea slug	Droupadi Murmu	A headshield slug from the Bay of Bengal named after President of India, Droupadi Murmu. "Since both the president and I come from the Rairangpur area of Mayurbhanj, I decided to name the species after her to honour her ascension to the high office," Tudu said.			
Melidia pif Massa, 2022	Katydid	Pif	"This species is friendly dedicated to Pif, nickname of Pierfrancesco Diliberto, director, radio-television host, screenwriter and actor, highly appreciated for his proximity to social and environmental problems"			
Melusinaster arcusinimicus † Thuy & Stöhr, 2018	Brittle star	Arch Enemy	A fossil species of basket star from the Jurassic of Luxembourg; its name is "the Latin translation of Arch Enemy, Swedish death metal band, for producing some of the heaviest melodic death metal songs ever, and in particular for having written masterpieces such as "We will rise" and "Reason to believe"".			
Mesobiotus maklowiczi Stec, 20228	Tardigrade	Robert Makłowicz	"The species is named after Robert Makłowicz, who is a journalist, historian, and culinary expert that beautifully promotes European cuisine and slow food. He lives in Kraków and runs his own YouTube channel that I enjoy watching. He is also a hat lover, and the egg processes of the new species resemble a funny peaked hat that Robert would be surely eager to try on."			
Mesobuthus brutus Fet et al., 2018	Scorpion	Brutus				
Mesoparapylocheles michaeljacksoni † Fraaije et al., 2012	Crustacean	Michael Jackson	A fossil hermit crab from the Cretaceous of northern Spain, "Named in honour of the "King of Pop", Michael Jackson, who passed away at the age of fifty [on] the same day when the holotype was found (June 25, 2009)"			
Mesoparapylocheles janetjacksonae † Fraaije, van Bakel, Jagt & Skupien, 2020	Crustacean	Janet Jackson	A fossil hermit crab from the Jurassic of the Czech Republic, "Named after Janet (Damita Jo) Jackson, well-known American singer, songwriter, actress, dancer and sister of the late Michael Jackson after whom the first member of this genus was named."			
Metabowmania braggi † Adrain & Westrop, 2007	Trilobite	Billy Bragg				
Metallactus dicaprioi Sassi, 2019	Beetle	Leonardo DiCaprio	"The species is named after Leonardo DiCaprio, a popular American actor, also known for his constant commitment to the preservation and conservation of biodiversity."			
Metallichneumon neurospastarchus Wahl & Sime, 2002	Wasp	Metallica	A parasitic wasp. The genus name honors the band, while neurospastarchus ("ruler of puppets" in Greek) alludes to "the weak and mindless nature" of hosts, and the album Master of Puppets.			
Microstomum tchaikovskyi Atherton & Jondelius, 2018	Flatworm	Pyotr Ilyich Tchaikovsky and Adrian Tchaikovsky	"This species is named in honor of Adrian Tchaikovsky, author, and Pyotr Ilyich Tchaikovsky, composer, whose audiobook and music respectively were much appreciated by the first author while sampling."			
Millardaspis knoxi † McAdams, Adrain & Karim, 2018	Trilobite	The Lady Chablis	Named after The Lady Chablis's birth name, Benjamin Knox.			
Millettia sirindhorniana Mattapha, Thanant., Kaewmuan & Suddee	Legume	Sirindhorn	A climbing liana from Thailand; "The specific epithet is chosen to honour Her Royal Highness Princess Maha Chakri Sirindhorn of Thailand for her dedication to science and encouragement of conservation in Thailand."			
Mimadiestra sirindhornae Dawwrueng, Storozhenko & Artchawakom, 2016	Cricket	Sirindhorn	This species is native to Thailand.			
Misumessus dicaprioi Edwards, 2017	Spider	Leonardo DiCaprio	"This species is named in honor of Leonardo DiCaprio, for his efforts to raise awareness about global warming."			
Mitrephora chulabhorniana Damth., Aongyong & Chaowasku	Flowering plant	Chulabhorn	This species is endemic to Thailand; "The epithet is to honor HRH Princess Chulabhorn, the youngest daughter of the late King Rama IX of Thailand. Princess Chulabhorn has a strong interest in science and has initiated the establishment of the "Chulabhorn Research Institute^ principally to promote and conduct basic as well as applied scientific research of national importance for the improvement of mankind's quality of life. One of her areas of expertise is the field of "natural products", and the new species herein described might contain bioactive compounds [...], possibly leading to the discovery of new drugs."			
Mitrephora sirindhorniae Chalermglin, Leerat. & R.M.K.Saunders	Flowering plant	Sirindhorn	This species is endemic to Thailand and was "Named after Her Royal Highness Maha Chakri Sirindhorn, in honour of her project on plant germplasm conservation in Thailand."			
Miturgopelma rangerstaceyae Raven, 2023	Spider	Stacey Thomson	An Australian species named "in honour of television presenter, Ranger Stacey Thomson, whose endless enthusiasm no doubt infected many children to pay attention to nature and was much appreciated by parents and teachers."			
Muldaster haakei † Thuy, Eriksson & Numberger-Thuy, 2022	Brittle star	Tomas Haake	A fossil species from the Silurian of Gotland, Sweden, which "honours Tomas Haake, Swedish drummer of metal band Meshuggah, representing a derived form of heavy metal music."			
Myzomela irianawidodoae Prawiradilaga et al., 2017	Bird	Iriana Joko Widodo	A species of Indonesian honeyeater endemic to Rote Island, named after the first lady of Indonesia at the time "to recognise her keen interest in Indonesia's birdlife and her valuable stewardship and advocacy for Indonesia's natural environments."			
Nannaria mcelroyorum Hennen, Means & Marek, 2021	Millipede	Clint McElroy, Justin McElroy, Travis McElroy and Griffin McElroy	"This species is named for Clint, Justin, Travis, and Griffin McElroy from Huntington, West Virginia, who provided endless hours of emotional support [...] during field collections through their podcasts, The Adventure Zone and My Brother, My Brother, and Me."			
Neilpeartia † Carnevale et al., 2020	Fish	Neil Peart	A genus of fossil frogfish from the Eocene of Italy, "named after the outstanding Canadian musician and writer Neil Ellwood Peart who passed away on January 7, 2020."			
Nemoura hugekootinlokorum Wang, 2021	Stonefly	Hu Ge and Louis Koo	A species of spring stonefly from southwestern China, "named in honor of Mr. Ge Hu and Mr. Tin-Lok Koo, two renowned actors, as an appreciation for their contribution to elementary education and environmental preservation in the mountainous areas of western China."			
Neoponera gojira Troya & Lattke, 2022	Ant	Gojira	A termite-predator ponerine ant from Brazil, whose name "honors the French metal band Gojira, in recognition of their altruistic activism for the conservation of nature, as well as for supporting the rights of ancestral indigenous peoples living across Amazonia. Through their lyrics the band promotes an increasing awareness of our paramount, nonetheless usually neglected, biological diversity."			
Neorhynchoplax chipolini Hsueh, 2018	Crustacean	Chi Po-lin	A species of true crab described from specimens collected in Kaohsiung, Taiwan, and "dedicated to the memory of Mr. Chi Po-Lin (27 December 1964–10 June 2017) aerial photographer and documentary film director who made an immense contribution to environmental protection in Taiwan."			
Nervellius philippus Braet, 2014	Wasp	Philippe of Belgium	"Named in honour of the seventh king of Belgium: Philippe Léopold Louis Marie de Belgique for his enthronement."			
Nesticus jemisinae Hedin & Milne, 2023	Spider	N. K. Jemisin	A scaffold web spider known only from a cave in Tennessee, named "in honor of N. K. Jemisin whose 'Broken Earth' book series features a subterranean colony, including scientists who study caves."			
Nystalus obamai Whitney et al., 2013	Bird	Barack Obama	The Western striolated puffbird from South America, which was split from the Eastern striolated puffbird after scientists noticed the difference in their song. "Barack Hussein Obama II has proven to be a public servant of the highest caliber. He was elected and re-elected the 44th President of the United States based primarily on his outstanding professional record as a fair-minded, resolute, and visionary humanitarian. With the name of this puffbird, we are pleased to recognize Obama's remarkably positive and pervasive influence on the world stage and, in particular, we support his staunch initiative to bring development of solar energy to the forefront at a time when this obviously ideal global energy solution is, incredibly, still an uphill battle. The mainstream use of solar power around the world will benefit all, certainly including the flora, fauna, and people of Amazonia, mainly by allowing the Earth's natural atmosphere to persist."			
Obamadon † Longrich et al., 2013	Lizard	Barack Obama	An extinct genus of lizards from the Cretaceous.			
Obamus † Dzaugis et al., 2018	Ediacaran biota	Barack Obama	A fossil, torus-shaped marine organism found in Ediacara Hills and Ediacara Conservation Park in South Australia, and named "In honour of President Barack Obama for his passion for science and the likeness of fossil morphology to his ears."			
Obtusopyrgus farri Verhaegen & Haase, 2021	Freshwater snail	Gareth Farr	A species from New Zealand "named after Gareth Farr, acclaimed New Zealand percussionist and composer integrating non-European music styles including Maori music into Western classical music resulting in the most fascinating and colorful synthesis of different musical expressions. His alter ego, the drag queen Lilith LaCroix, is also colorful."			
Oenonella wasisnamei † Adrain & Fortey, 2022	Trilobite	Buddy Wasisname	A trilobite from the Ordovician of Newfoundland, Canada.			
Oenonella otherfellersorum † Adrain & Fortey, 2022	Trilobite	The Other Fellers	A trilobite from the Ordovician of Newfoundland, Canada.			
Ogyges aluxi Schuster, Cano & Boucher, 2005	Beetle	Alux Nahual	""Alux" is a Mayan term meaning "spirit". The specific name honors the Guatemalan rock band Alux Nahual. While on tour in Honduras with the band, Schuster [the lead author, who was also a band member] found various passalids, some new to science."			
Ogyges menchuae Cano, 2014	Beetle	Rigoberta Menchú	"Named in honor of the Nobel Prize winner, Dr. Rigoberta Menchú, who was born in Laj Chimel."; All the specimens used to describe this species were collected from forests near Laj Chimel, Guatemala.			
Ogyges nahuali Schuster, Cano & Boucher, 2005	Beetle	Alux Nahual	""Nahual" is a Mayan term for a spirit that each person has within himself [sic] (the alter ego), usually in the form of an animal, a "duende" in Spanish. This name was chosen to honor the Guatemalan rock band Alux Nahual. During concert tours, Schuster [the lead author, who was also a band member] was able to collect passalids in Honduras and other Central American countries and to examine collections of passalids."			
Ogyges toriyamai Cano, 2014	Beetle	Akira Toriyama	"Named after Akira Toriyama, the Japanese artist creator of the manga and anime series Dragon Ball."; Another species was concurrently named Ogyges mutenroshii, after the character Master Roshi from this series.			
Oligoaeschna sirindhornae Ngiam & Orr, 2017	Dragonfly	Sirindhorn	"We humbly dedicate this species to Her Royal Highness, The Princess Maha Chakri Sirindhorn of Thailand, in recognition of her continuing support of nature conservation and as a mark of personal admiration by the authors."			
Oligopseudamia iancurtisi † Marramà, Giusberti & Carnevale, 2022	Fish	Ian Curtis	A fossil cardinalfish from the Oligocene of Italy, "named after the late British musician and composer Ian Curtis in honour of his music, which was an excellent companion during long hours at the microscope while analysing the fossil specimens."			
Olios jaenicke Jäger, 2012	Spider	Hannes Jaenicke	"This species is dedicated to the German actor and environmental campaigner Hannes Jaenicke for his activities about and documentaries on threatened animal species and for raising general awareness in the public on such topics. Also for his dedication to the Senckenberg Research Society"			
Olpium caputi Krajčovičová & Christophoryová, 2024	Pseudoscorpion	Zuzana Čaputová	A species from Tahiti which was described by two Slovak female zoologists, and named "honouring Zuzana Čaputová, the Slovak President. As a female leader, she expresses clear attitudes and supports women as well as scientists."			
Opaluma rupaul Lessard & Woodley, 2020	Fly	RuPaul	A brightly coloured soldier fly from Australia, named "in honour of the drag superstar RuPaul Charles who is known to wear extravagant outfits that resemble this species." The lead author told the press "I'd been watching a lot of RuPaul's Drag Race when I was examining the specimen under the microscope, so it was on my mind!" And I really wanted to give this group of flies a memorable name because it needs the attention – the first specimen of this RuPaul fly was collected over a hundred years ago and sat neglected in a museum collection until someone with the knowledge of that group came along to name and document them." He also said that naming the fly after RuPaul came as an "obvious decision" because "It has a costume of shiny metallic rainbow colours, and it has legs for days."			
Ophelosia mcglashani Berry, 1995	Wasp	Don McGlashan				
Ophiocordyceps deltoroi Ballest.-Aguirre, Sanjuan & Guzm.-Dáv. (2025)	Fungus	Guillermo del Toro	A member of the zombie-ant fungus complex endemic to Jalisco, Mexico, and named "in honour of Guillermo Del Toro, a Mexican filmmaker born in the Jalisco state, famous for his fantastic movie characters."			
Ophiogojira † Thuy, Numberger-Thuy & Pineda-Enríquez, 2021	Brittle star	Gojira	A fossil genus from the Jurassic of France and Luxembourg, "named in honour of French metal band Gojira, for producing songs of an unfathomable intensity, beautifully dark and heavy, and exploring the abyss of life and death, of human strength and error, and of thriving and yet threatened oceans."			
Ophiogojira labadiei † Thuy, Numberger-Thuy & Pineda-Enríquez, 2021	Brittle star	Jean-Michel Labadie	A fossil species from the Jurassic of France, named after the bass player of French metal band Gojira.			
Ophioleviathan watsoni † Thuy, 2013	Brittle star	Paul Watson	A fossil species from the Jurassic of Austria, "named in honour of Paul Watson, founder of the Sea Shepherd Conservation Society, in admiring recognition of his relentless commitment to the protection of marine wildlife."			
Ophiolofsson joelmciveri † Thuy, Eriksson, Kutscher & Numberger-Thuy, 2024	Brittle star	Joel McIver	A fossil species from the Silurian of Gotland, Sweden "named after prolific British author and music journalist, Joel McIver, for his unique ability to convey the cultural importance and impact of music."			
Ophiolofsson obituary † Thuy, Eriksson, Kutscher & Numberger-Thuy, 2024	Brittle star	Obituary	A fossil species from the Silurian of Gotland, Sweden "named after American death metal pioneers, Obituary, who were fundamental in developing the death metal genre, and appropriately, O. obituary gen. et sp. nov. represents a basal species in the Ophiolofsson lineage."			
Ophiolofsson immolation † Thuy, Eriksson, Kutscher & Numberger-Thuy, 2024	Brittle star	Immolation	A fossil species from the Silurian of Gotland, Sweden "named after legendary American death metal band, Immolation, who came onto the scene slightly later than the above-mentioned Obituary." (as did this species compared to O. obituary). Genus Ophiolofsson is named after Swedish artist Pär Olofsson, who has illustrated the covers of several Immolation albums.			
Ophiomalleus stevenwilsoni † Thuy, 2013	Brittle star	Steven Wilson	A fossil species from the Cretaceous of Germany, "named in honour of British musician Steven Wilson, one of the contemporaneous masters of originality and creativity, whose music often taught me how to let ideas develop and materialise."			
Ophiopetagno doro † Thuy, Eriksson, Kutscher & Numberger-Thuy, 2024	Brittle star	Doro	A fossil species from the Silurian of Gotland, Sweden "named after heavy metal singer Dorothee Pesch, also known as 'Doro', to honor her commitment, musical career and role as a pioneer and gate opener for female vocalists in metal music."			
Ophiopetagno kansas † Thuy, Eriksson, Kutscher & Numberger-Thuy, 2024	Brittle star	Kansas	A fossil species from the Silurian of Gotland, Sweden "named after American rock band Kansas, for producing some of the most inspiring songs in the history of rock music, including "Carry On Wayward Son" and "Dust in the Wind"."			
Ophiotardis tennanti † Thuy & Numberger-Thuy, 2021	Brittle star	David Tennant	A fossil species from the Jurassic of Luxembourg. "Species named in honour of Scottish actor David Tennant, for his performance as the tenth incarnation of The Doctor in the science fiction series Doctor Who, bringing us inspiration during moments of frustration while writing the present paper." The genus Ophiotardis, created concurrently, was "formed as a combination of óphis, Greek for serpent, a commonly used prefix in ophiuroid genus names, and TARDIS, acronym for "Time And Relative Dimension In Space", the time machine and spacecraft used by Dr Who."			
Ophiura tankardi † Thuy, Nungesser & Numberger-Thuy, 2022	Brittle star	Tankard	A fossil species from the Oligocene of the Mainz Basin, Germany, "named in honor of German thrash metal band Tankard, to celebrate their loyal and consistent connection to their fan base."			
Orasema difrancoae Herreid & Heraty, 2008	Wasp	Ani DiFranco	"I have admired Ani DiFranco for about 10 years," Herreid said. "I like her music and I think she is a great role model."			
Orbiniella mayhemi Meca & Budaeva, 2024	Polychaete worm	Mayhem	"The species is named in honour to the Norwegian Black Metal band from Oslo, Mayhem, one of the bands that most contributed to the development of the Norwegian Black Metal in the 90s. [The lead author] was listening to their music to endure the darkest hours in the lab."			
Orcevia timburtoni Yu, Maddison & Zhang, 2023	Spider	Tim Burton	"in honor of the American filmmaker and animator Timothy Walter Burton. Tim Burton's excellent films fired the first author's imagination while he was a child. His films have a gothic and dark nature, reminiscent of the dark coloration in female of the new species."			
Orectochilus orbisonorum Miller, Mazzoldi & Wheeler, 2008	Beetle	Roy Orbison and his widow Barbara Orbison	A species of whirligig beetle from India, which is distinctive for the contrast between its black hard upper carapace and white, translucent underbelly. "It almost looks like it's wearing a tuxedo," Wheeler said.			
Osbeckia zubeengargiana Barn.Das & N.Nath	Flowering plant	Zubeen Garg	This species is native to Assam, India, and "named after the heartthrob of Assam, the late legendary singer, lyricist, film maker, actor, poet, nature lover Zubeen Garg, Hon. D. Litt., for his outstanding contribution to the Assamese culture as well for the conservation of nature."			
Osbornellus obamai Domínguez & Godoy, 2010	Leafhopper	Barack Obama				
Osornophryne backshalli Reyes-Puig et al., 2025	Frog	Steve Backshall	"The specific epithet is a patronym in honor of the explorer and television presenter Steve Backshall, of London, UK. He has raised awareness of nature around the world and has, through his patronage of the World Land Trust, contributed directly to the conservation of the Corredor de Conectividad Llanganates-Sangay, the habitat of this particular species and many others."			
Otarion beukeboomi † Adrain & Chatterton, 1994	Trilobite	Jeff Beukeboom	Thirteen Canadian species were named, in a series of four papers, after members of the Edmonton Oilers team that won the 1990 Stanley Cup (See also species in genera Aulacopleura, Cyphaspis, Harpidella, Maurotarion and Songkania).			
Otarion huddyi † Adrain & Chatterton, 1994	Trilobite	Charlie Huddy	Thirteen Canadian species were named, in a series of four papers, after members of the Edmonton Oilers team that won the 1990 Stanley Cup (See also species in genera Aulacopleura, Cyphaspis, Harpidella, Maurotarion and Songkania).			
Ozicrypta combeni Raven & Churchill, 1994	Spider	Pat Comben	A brushed trapdoor spider endemic to Queensland, Australia, named "for Pat Comben, Minister for the Environment and Heritage (1989–1992), in recognition of his efforts to ensure national parks of Queensland, like the type locality, Forty Mile Scrub National Park, are representative of the biodiversity of the state."			
Pachyrhinosaurus perotorum † Hanelt et al., 2012	Dinosaur	Ross Perot and family	"In recognition of members of the Perot family (Margot and H. Ross Perot and their children), who have demonstrated a long history of supporting science and science education for the public."			
Palmnickeneoceras ejersboi † Fanti & Damgaard, 2018	Beetle	Jakob Ejersbo	A fossil soldier beetle found in Baltic amber from the Eocene of Kaliningrad Oblast.			
Paragordius obamai Hanelt et al., 2012	Horsehair worm	Barack Obama	"This species is named in honor of the 44th president of the United States of America, Barack H. Obama, whose father was raised and paternal step-grandmother resides in Nyang'oma Kogelo (Kogelo), Kenya, 19 km northwest of the type locality."			
Parakoldinioidia akerfeldti † Westrop & Adrain, 2014	Trilobite	Mikael Åkerfeldt	Five species in this genus were concurrently named after members of Opeth (see also List of organisms named after famous people (born 1975–present)).			
Parakoldinioidia akessoni † Westrop & Adrain, 2014	Trilobite	Fredrik Åkesson	Five species in this genus were concurrently named after members of Opeth (see also List of organisms named after famous people (born 1975–present)).			
Parakoldinioidia lindgreni † Westrop & Adrain, 2014	Trilobite	Peter Lindgren	Five species in this genus were concurrently named after members of Opeth (see also List of organisms named after famous people (born 1975–present)).			
Paraliupanshania torvaldsi † Bechly et al., 2001	Dragonfly	Linus Torvalds	"Named in honor of Dr. Linus Torvalds, initiator and main developer of the Linux operating system."			
Paramaka pearljam Mariano, 2011	Mayfly	Pearl Jam	"Named to celebrate the 20th anniversary of Pearl Jam."			
Paramphitrite dragovabeci Lavesque, Daffe, Londoño-Mesa & Hutchings, 2021	Polychaete worm	Drago Vabec	"This species is dedicated to the Yugoslav football player Drago Vabec, legend of the "Stade Brestois" Football Club from 1979 to 1983. This species name was proposed by Jacques Grall (IUEM laboratory—Brest), who collected the type material and who is a great fan of both this club and this player."			
Paraphlegopteryx aykroydi Weaver, III, 1999	Caddisfly	Dan Aykroyd	"Named after Dan Aykroyd in honor of his shenanigans as Beldar the Conehead"			
Parascepsis lantingi Grados, 2020	Moth	Frans Lanting	"The first author and Rainforest Expeditions SAC, which support the project "Discovery new species" in Tambopata would like to dedicate the discovery of this new species to Frans Lanting, whom with wife Christine Eckstrom were key players in raising awareness and establishing the international standing of Tambopata so that it became known in every corner of the world."			
Pastorius † Carnevale & Johnson, 2015	Fish	Jaco Pastorius	A genus of fossil cusk-eels from the Cretaceous of Italy.			
Pastorius methenyi † Carnevale & Johnson, 2015	Fish	Pat Metheny	A species of fossil cusk-eel from the Cretaceous of Italy.			
Penicillium maximae Visagie, Houbraken & Samson, 2013	Fungus	Queen Máxima of the Netherlands	One of five species of Penicillium fungi identified from strains stored at the CBS-KNAW Fungal Biodiversity Centre in Utrecht, Netherlands, and named after the members of the Dutch royal family to coincide with the coronation of Willem-Alexander of the Netherlands (see also List of organisms named after famous people (born 1975–present)).			
Penicillium vanoranjei Visagie, Houbraken & Samson, 2013	Fungus	Willem-Alexander of the Netherlands	One of five species of Penicillium fungi identified from strains stored at the CBS-KNAW Fungal Biodiversity Centre in Utrecht, Netherlands, and named after the members of the Dutch royal family to coincide with the coronation of Willem-Alexander; "named, in reference to the orange (Dutch=oranje) coloured colonies produced by this species, after Willem-Alexander Claus George Ferdinand, 'Zijne Koninklijke Hoogheid de Prins van Oranje' (translated from Dutch as: 'His Royal Highness the Prince of Orange') and the new King of the Netherlands upon the retirement of Queen Beatrix on 30 April 2013."			
Peperomia sirindhorniana Suwanph. & Chantar.	Flowering plant	Sirindhorn	A radiator plant native to Thailand, named to honour "Her Royal Highness Princess Maha Chakri Sirindhorn Mahidol who initiated the Plant Genetic Conservation Project to develop the personnel and plant genetics resources for the maintenance of plant varieties, and for the development to be advantageous for farmers and the business sector of Thailand."			
Pertusaria rayana E. Tripp & J. Watts	Lichen	Amy Ray	"in honor of Amy Ray of the long-time musical duo, Indigo Girls. Together with Emily Saliers, Amy has been an indefatigable advocate for environmental protection and social justice. She (along with Emily and Winona LaDuke) co-founded the non-profit organization Honor the Earth, which works to promote education and raise awareness of environmental issues impacting indigenous communities. For numerous years, Amy has campaigned to help end nuclear waste dumping on Native American reservations and, together with Emily, has long integrated activism into her tours. [...] Her songs have kept us company over many years spent understanding and describing lichen biodiversity; they have furthermore inspired much of our own scientific activism to help end repressive behaviors by governments and industries that do not serve the interests of our ecosystems nor human livelihood. This new species reminds us of Amy because its yellow isidia are radiant and full of life. It's UV+ orange reaction further reminds us that it is rather dynamic on the inside, too."			
Phanaeus changdiazi Kohlmann & Solís-Blanco, 2001	Beetle	Franklin Chang Díaz				
Philodoria obamaorum Kobayashi, Johns & Kawahara, 2021	Moth	Barack Obama and Michelle Obama	A leaf miner moth endemic to Hawaii, USA, "named after Barack Hussein Obama II, the 44th president of the United States, born in Honolulu, Hawaii, and his wife, First Lady Michelle LaVaughn Robinson Obama. They [...] have continued to support nature conservation efforts in Hawaii."			
Philogenia marinasilva Machado, 2010	Damselfly	Marina Silva	A species described from a single specimen collected in Acre, Brazil, and "Named in honor of senator Marina Silva, the former Minister of [the] Environment of Brazil in recognition for her outstanding contribution to the protection of the Amazonian forest, especially that of the state of Acre."			
Pholcus rawiriae Huber, 2014	Spider	Angèle Rawiri	This cellar spider is native to Gabon.			
Photinus guillermodeltoroi Zaragoza-Caballero & Rodríguez-Mirón, 2023	Firefly	Guillermo del Toro	This species, described from specimens collected in Tapalpa, Jalisco, Mexico, was named "in honor of Guillermo del Toro, a prominent Jalisco-born filmmaker and director."			
Phricotelphusa sirindhorn Naiyanetr, 1989	Crustacean	Sirindhorn				
Phrurolithus lindemanni Marusik, Omelko & Koponen, 2020	Spider	Till Lindemann	Subsequently transferred to genus Labialithus.			
Phuwiangosaurus sirindhornae † Martin, Buffetaut & Suteethorn, 1994	Dinosaur	Sirindhorn	A sauropod from the late Jurassic/early Cretaceous of Thailand, named "In honour of Her Royal Highness Princess Maha Chakri Sirindhorn, Princess of Thailand, who has repeatedly demonstrated her great interest for the palaeontological riches of her country."			
Phyllonastes dicaprioi Ortega et al., 2025	Frog	Leonardo DiCaprio	A cloud forest landfrog from Ecuador, whose name "is a patronym honouring Leonardo DiCaprio, actor, film producer, and conservationist. He has voiced his support for several conservation initiatives in Ecuador; and in 2021, he pledged funds for the conservation and ecosystem restoration of the Galapagos Islands, Ecuador."			
Physalaemus cristinae Cardozo et al., 2023	Frog	Cristina Fernández de Kirchner	A Southern frog native to Argentina and Paraguay, "dedicated to the ex-Presidenta [sic] and current Vice Presidenta [sic] of Argentina, Cristina Elisabet Fernández de Kirchner, in recognition of her extraordinary contributions to the improvement of the educative [sic] and scientific systems in this country, including the creation of the Ministery of "Ciencia, Tecnologıa e Innovación Productiva" [sic], more than 1800 schools and 15 universities with free public access, ARSAT (Empresa Argentina de Soluciones Satelitales, Sociedad Anónima), INVAP (Instituto de Investigaciones Aplicadas), and a significant increase in the national budget for science."			
Physoschistura chulabhornae Suvarnaraksha, 2013	Fish	Chulabhorn	A freshwater stone loach native to the Chaophraya River basin in Thailand; "The species epithet honours Her Royal Highness Princess Chulabhorn for her valuable scientific works."			
Picea burtonii † Klymiuk & Stockey, 2012	Conifer	Tim Burton	A fossil species from the Cretaceous of Vancouver Island. "The ovuliferous scale, when viewed in transverse section, seems a demonstrable case of "life imitating art."" (it resembles a goblin-like creature)			
Pison larsoni Menke, 1988	Wasp	Gary Larson	"dedicated to Gary Larson whose The Far Side cartoons have brought much laughter to me and many other entomologists."			
Pista miosseci Lavesque, Daffe, Londoño-Mesa & Hutchings, 2021	Polychaete worm	Miossec	"This species is dedicated to the famous Brest singer Christophe Miossec, whose music has accompanied [the lead author] for 25 years, especially when writing."			
Placida barackobamai McCarthy, Krug & Valdés, 2010	Sea slug	Barack Obama	"This species is named in honor of the 44th President of the United States of America, Barack Hussein Obama, born in the State of Hawaii, where the holotype of this species was collected. With this name, we would like to recognize President Obama for his efforts to reduce carbon emissions globally and lessen the effects of climate change, as well as for his Proclamation on August 26, 2016 that dramatically expanded the Papahānaumokuākea Marine National Monument, in order to preserve this culturally and ecologically important region for future generations."			
Platycoelia hiporum Smith, 2003	Beetle	The Tragically Hip	This species was described by a Canadian entomologist.			
Platygomphus benritarum Joshi & Mital, 2022	Dragonfly	Monisha Behal and Rita Banerji	A clubtail from India, "Named in honor of Monisha "Ben" Behal (founder, North East Network), and Rita Banerji (founder, Green Hub) for their pioneering work across two decades. Both women have been empowering and training the youth of northeast India to become change-makers, working towards creating ecological security, sustainable livelihoods, and social change. The species epithet is the feminine genitive plural created from combining the two names Ben and Rita."			
Plebejus chrisreai Churkin, Kolesnichenko & Yakovlev, 2019	Butterfly	Chris Rea	"The species is named after Christopher Anton (Chris) Rea, British rock and blues singer-songwriter and guitarist. The songs of Chris Rea accompanied us in the mountains and deserts for over two decades of expeditions and always brought us luck."			
Plega vangiersbergenae Ardila-Camacho, 2024	Mantisfly	Anneke van Giersbergen				
Pleisticanthoides cameroni Ng & Richer de Forges, 2012	Crustacean	James Cameron	"The species is named after director and deep-sea explorer James Francis Cameron, to honour his landmark dive into the Mariana Trench on 24 March 2012 onboard the Deepsea Challenger, the third man ever to dive to such depths. His films on deep-sea and extra-terrestrial worlds have also been an inspiration to explorers everywhere."			
Pleurothallis petroana Sierra-Ariza	Orchid	Gustavo Petro	A bonnet orchid native to Colombia, named "In honor of Gustavo Francisco Petro Urrego, President of the Republic of Colombia (2022–2026), in commemoration of his political career; winner of the Letelier-Moffitt Human Rights Award (2007); tireless supporter of social causes and interest in caring for the environment and mitigating climate change."			
Pleurotus sirindhorniae Suwannarach et al., 2020	Fungus	Sirindhorn	A species of oyster mushroom native to Thailand.			
Plumatella chulabhornae Wood, 2006	Bryozoan	Chulabhorn	A freshwater species native to Thailand. "With kind permission from the Office of Her Royal Highness' Personal Affairs Division the species name honors Princess Chulabhorn, a tireless and effective supporter of scientific endeavors in Thailand."			
Pluteus millsii Justo et al. (2023)	Fungus	Mike Mills	"At the request of the original collector, Jan Borovička, this species is dedicated to Michael "Mike" Edward Mills, bassist, pianist, and background vocalist of the band R.E.M. Mike is considered R.E.M.'s little genius, and we describe this little American Pluteus in his honor."			
Poecilipta zbigniewi Raven, 2015	Spider	Zbigniew Preisner				
Polystachya anastacialynae Eb.Fisch., Killmann, J.-P.Lebel & Delep.	Orchid	Anastacia	This species was dedicated to the singer by a longtime German fan who sponsored the research through BIOPAT.			
Pomphus zielinskii Kania, 2001	Weevil	Maciej Zieliński	A Namibian species described by a scientist from the University of Wrocław, and "dedicated to the top Polish basketball player, Maciej Zieliński."			
Pouteria samborae Alves-Araújo & Mônico	Flowering plant	Richie Sambora	"The epithet is a tribute to Richard Stephen "Richie" Sambora [...] an American rock star, producer, musician, singer and songwriter whose contribution to music over the last decades has been prodigious and unique. While this may be an unusual tribute, his songs were the soundtrack while performing the fieldwork where the new species was gathered."			
Predatoroonops mctiernani Brescovit et al., 2012	Spider	John McTiernan	The generic name Predatoroonops "is a contraction of "Predator Oonops," taken from the science-fiction action movie Predator. The name refers the fact that all species show the frontal area of the male chelicerae with modified structures that resemble the face of the Predator character [...]. It is also a homage to the 25th anniversary of this blockbuster success." McTiernan is the director of the film.			
Predatoroonops peterhalli Brescovit et al., 2012	Spider	Kevin Peter Hall	Hall played the Predator in the film Predator.			
Pristimantis jamescameroni Kok, 2013	Frog	James Cameron	"honouring the Canadian film director, producer, environmentalist and explorer Mr. James F. Cameron in recognition of his efforts to alert the general public to environmental problems through pioneering high quality "blockbuster" movies and adventurous documentaries. James Cameron also encourages people to go vegan (a diet excluding animal products), one of the effective ways to reduce human environmental impacts such as global climate change, identified as a serious threat to tepuis ecosystems." The species is known only from Aprada-tepui, Venezuela.			
Protonemura apetor Murányi, Kovács, Vinçon & Manko, 2023	Stonefly	Apetor	"We dedicate this species to the memory of Tor Eckhoff (1964–2021) aka Apetor. His YouTube videos are still teaching us (related in spirit) how to find happiness in simple things, about the joy of life, and respect and love of Nature."			
Protonemura soad Murányi, Manko, Kovács & Vinçon, 2023	Stonefly	System of a Down	This species is native to Armenia and Georgia. "We dedicate this species to the Armenian-American metal band System of a Down (a.k.a. SoaD). Science should recognize the single most potent element of human existence; biodiversity studies should help to save our Mother Earth."			
Pseudapanteles christianafigueresae Fernández-Triana & Whitfield, 2014	Wasp	Christiana Figueres	"for her persistent interest in ACG survival since the early 1990s, and up through her ... efforts to get the world to reverse its climate change"			
Pseudapanteles jorgerodriguezi Fernández-Triana & Whitfield, 2014	Wasp	Jorge Rodríguez	"who ... helped ACG forge new paths of self-support through Environmental Service Payments"			
Pseudapanteles josefigueresi Fernández-Triana & Whitfield, 2014	Wasp	José María Figueres	"in recognition of his steady and imaginative support of ACG foundation, growth and survival through non-damaging biodiversity development"			
Pseudapanteles laurachinchillae Fernández-Triana & Whitfield, 2014	Wasp	Laura Chinchilla	"in gratitude for her persistent tolerance of ACG efforts to push the conservation envelope during her term in office."			
Pseudapanteles luisguillermosolisi Fernández-Triana & Whitfield, 2014	Wasp	Luis Guillermo Solís	"in appreciation of the new opportunity for further administrative evolution that his election offers to ACG"			
Pseudapanteles ottonsolisi Fernández-Triana & Whitfield, 2014	Wasp	Ottón Solís	"in recognition of his steadfast policy support of the ACG concept throughout two decades ... and the foundation of the party, PAC"			
Pseudapanteles renecastroi Fernández-Triana & Whitfield, 2014	Wasp	René Castro	"who helped ACG and INBio in their early years ..., promoted the development of Costa Rica's carbon market, and tolerated the growing pains of decentralized administration of Costa Rica's conserved wildlands."			
Pseudochelidon sirintarae Thonglongya, 1968	Bird	Sirindhorn	The white-eyed river martin, endemic to Thailand and now possibly extinct, was "named in honour of Her Royal Highness [...] the third daughter of King Bhumibol Adulyadej of Thailand, for her gracious interest in the wildlife of the Kingdom."			
Pseudoclelandia weymouthae † Adrain, Westrop, Karim & Landing 2014	Trilobite	Tina Weymouth				
Pseudohystricurus wigglesorum † Adrain, Karim & Westrop, 2014	Trilobite	The Wiggles				
Pseudoloxops kamalaharrisae Balukjian & Van Dam, 2024	True bug	Kamala Harris	"This species is named in honor of the Vice President of the United States Kamala Harris, who was born in Oakland, California, where the lead author resides and teaches. This species also honors Vice President Harris' work in helping to establish the American Climate Corps in 2023, a jobs-training and education initiative that is aligned with the lead author's Workforce Development efforts in the Natural History and Sustainability program at Merritt College in Oakland."			
Pseudotrichonympha leei del Campo & Keeling, 2017	Protist	Geddy Lee	Three species in this genus were named concurrently after the members of the Canadian band Rush, "who [...] have inspired an interest in natural history and science through art." "A Spanish postdoc, Javier del Campo, asked me to recommend some good Canadian music, and I suggested he listen to Rush," said Patrick Keeling, a University of British Columbia microbiologist and senior author on the paper describing the species. "He came back to me and said 'Those microbes we're finding have long hair like the guys on the album 2112!'" (referring to the abundant flagella on these species).			
Pseudotrichonympha lifesoni del Campo & Keeling, 2017	Protist	Alex Lifeson				
Pseudotrichonympha pearti del Campo & Keeling, 2017	Protist	Neil Peart				
Pseudozaphanera narendramodii Ragupathy & Radhakrishnan, 2019	True bug	Narendra Modi	A whitefly described from specimens collected from Tamil Nadu, India.			
Pterophylla makiniae H.C.Hopkins, J.Bradford & Pillon	Flowering plant	Jully Makini	A tree endemic to the Western Province of the Solomon Islands, "Named for the Solomon Islands' poet, writer and activist for women's rights, Jully Makini, who was born in Western Province."			
Pterostichus neilgaimani Chaladze et al., 2017	Beetle	Neil Gaiman	"Species is named after author Neil Gaiman, for bringing back what has been forgotten."			
Pterourus bjorkae Pavulaan, 2024	Butterfly	Björk	"The species name honors Icelandic singer, songwriter, and environmentalist Björk, to recognize her artistic influence and her contributions to environmental awareness."			
Ptomaphaginus isabellarossellini Schilthuizen, Njunjić & Perreau, 2018	Beetle	Isabella Rossellini	"Named in honour of the actress and biologist Isabella Rossellini, whose short movies and stage performances on animal reproduction have popularized theories on the evolution of genitalia. In P. isabellarossellini, the extremely long penis stylet in the male and similarly long spermiduct in the female suggest a long history of sexually antagonistic coevolution, one of the types of selection that appears in Rossellini's Green Porno series on SundanceTV.			
Punkochyzeria khoyi † Kolesnikov, Turbanov & Vorontsov, 2025	Mite	Yuri Klinskikh	A fossil species found in Cretaceous Burmese amber, described by Russian scientists and "named after Yuri N. Klinskikh (1964–2000), also known as "Yuri Khoy", a Russian musician, singer and a founder of the punk-rock band "Sektor Gaza"." Genus Punkochyzeria was created concurrently and uses the "prefix punk [...] a subculture, one of the characteristic features of which is a hairstyle reminiscent of the arrangement of long dorsal opisthosomal setae in the new genus."			
Pyralis papaleonei Huemer, Kaila & Segerer, 2026	Moth	Pope Leo XIV	"The new species is dedicated to the head of the Catholic Church, Pope Leo XIV. The Pontiff is a strong advocate of climate and environmental protection, and we hope that his voice may serve as an example for humanity. Furthermore, due to its distinctive coloration and overall appearance, the new species belongs to a group of Pyralidae whose species names refer to high secular or ecclesiastical offices, including Pyralis regalis, Pyralis imperialis (= P. kacheticalis), Pyralis princeps, and Pyralis cardinalis."			
Qiliania graffini † Ji et al., 2011	Bird	Greg Graffin	"In honour of Dr Gregory Graffin, lecturer at the University of California, Los Angeles and co-founder of the musical group Bad Religion, for his contributions to evolutionary biology, his public outreach through music, and his inspiration to young scientists around the world."			
Quadricona madonnae † Topper, Skovsted, Brock & Paterson, 2011	Early Arthropod	Madonna	A fossil Bradoriid from the Cambrian of South Australia, "named for the American entertainer Madonna; in reference to the nodes on each valve resembling her conical brassiere made famous during the 1980s and 1990s, particularly her "Blond Ambition" tour in 1990."			
Quamtana hectori Huber, 2003	Spider	Hector Pieterson	A cellar spider native to South Africa, whose name "commemorates Hector Pietersen [sic] and the other children shot in Soweto, June 16, 1976 by police."			
Raputia santosii Kallunki	Flowering plant	Juan Manuel Santos	A species from Amazonian Colombia, whose name "honors former President Juan Manuel Santos, one of the chief proponents of Colombia BIO, a national research program created during his administration for the express purpose of funding biological expeditions, during which many new species of plants have been collected."			
Rhinatrema shiv Gower, Wilkinson, Sherratt & Kok, 2010	Caecilian	Shivnarine Chanderpaul	A species from Guyana, "Named in honour of Shivnarine 'Shiv' Chanderpaul (born 1974), in recognition of his being the West Indies' most capped and highest run-scoring Guyanese cricketer, and international cricketer of the year in 2008."			
Rhogeessa menchuae Baird, Marchán-Rivadeneira, Pérez & Baker, 2012	Bat	Rigoberta Menchú	A small bat species found in Honduras and Guatemala. "This species is named to honor Rigoberta Menchú (along with the rest of the Menchú family) for her decades of work establishing a better understanding of the Mayan culture in Guatemala. Her important work has earned her a Nobel Peace Prize. She always underscored, among other traits, the respect of nature by the native peoples of this area. We propose "Menchu's little yellow bat" as the English common name."			
Rhyzodiastes (Temoana) xii Wang, 2016	Beetle	Xi Jinping	"[D]edicated to Dr. Xi Jin-Ping, the General Secretary of the Chinese Communist Party, for his leadership making our motherland stronger and stronger." Entomologist Cheng-Bin Wang also said that "The Rhyzodiastes (Temoana) is very rare – you might not encounter a single one even after 10 field collection sessions – and it also eats rotten wood for food… so it's a metaphor for Xi Jinping, a rare person you only encounter once a century, and specifically his controls on corruption [eating rot], which will allow Chinese corruption to gradually disappear." However, censors in China, perceiving the naming of a "bug" as a possible slight against Xi, clamped down on any online references to the new beetle species and ordered them to be removed from Chinese social media. Responding to the censorship, Wang said his gesture had been "deliberately vilified". He was mortified that the naming had been taken as an insult, and stated that it had been intended as a "tremendous honour". Wang believed it to be the first species to be named after a Chinese leader, saying: "As long as science exists, the name will forever exist. It's a very rare species of beetle, and I would certainly have appreciated it if someone had named it after me".			
Rissoella aliciae Espinosa & Ortea, 2009	Sea snail	Alicia Leal	A species native to Cuba, "named after the painter Alicia Leal Veloz (Sancti Spíritus, 1957) for the constant presence of nature in her pictorial work, in which even Noah's Ark is present and in which animals are actors or extras in everyday scenes of peasant life or Afro-Cuban rites."			
Rissoella belkisae Ortea & Espinosa, 2004	Sea snail	Belkis Ayón	A species native to Cuba, named "in homage to Belkis Ayón, Havana (1967–1999) painter of the African spirituality inherent to the black people in Cuba, concerned with the role of women in the environment of the ñáñigos (Abakuá secret society)."			
Rissoella taniae Ortea & Espinosa, 2004	Sea snail	Tania Bruguera	A species native to Cuba, named "in homage to Tania Brugueras [sic] (Havana, 1968), an artist who delves into the real life of Cubans and at the same time concerns herself with the world that surrounds her through migration, moving her discourse through the air."			
Rogneda verveckeni Artois, 2008	Flatworm	Erwin Vervecken	This species was described by a Belgian scientist.			
Rollinschaeta † Parry et al., 2015	Polychaete worm	Henry Rollins	A fossil annelid worm from the Cretaceous of Lebanon. "Derivation of name: Rollins – for Henry Rollins + chaeta, from Late Latin, for a bristle, seta or long hair."			
Rossaspis leboni † Adrain, Westrop, Karim & Landing 2014	Trilobite	Simon Le Bon				
Saccocirrus slateri Di Domenico, Martínez & Worsaae, 2019	Polychaete worm	Kelly Slater	"named in honor of surfer Kelly Slater, who has been crowned World Surf League Champion 11 times. The genus Saccocirrus is often found at exposed sandy beaches, where they are able to cope with the turbulence produced by the waves by moving horizontally along the beach slope."			
Saepocephalum stephenfryi Gustafsson & Bush, 2017	Louse	Stephen Fry	In a revision of the Brueelia-complex, the louse was named in recognition of Fry because his "quiz show "QI" can be seen as a revision of the complexity of human knowledge, one misunderstanding at the time."			
Sanaungulus rosenzweigi † Fanti & Damgaard, 2020	Beetle	Tal R	A fossil soldier beetle found in Burmese amber from the Cretaceous of Hukawng Valley. "Named in honor of the Danish artist Tal Rosenzweig, known as Tal R."			
Sanaungulus strungei † Fanti & Damgaard, 2019	Beetle	Michael Strunge	A fossil soldier beetle found in Burmese amber from the Cretaceous of Hukawng Valley. "In memory of the Danish poet Michael Strunge Jensen (Hvidovre, 19 June 1958 - Copenhagen, 9 March 1986)."			
Sarcofahrtiopsis spinetta Mulieri & Dufek, 2019	Fly	Luis Alberto Spinetta	A flesh fly from Argentina, named "in honor of Luis Alberto Spinetta, Argentine singer, guitarist and songwriter, one of the most influential rock musicians of Argentina."			
Sarsamphiascus jackiei Karanovic, 2020	Crustacean	Jackie Jackson	"The species is named in honour of Sigmund Esco 'Jackie' Jackson, the oldest of five brothers in the American music-group The Jackson 5, which came to prominence in 1969, after signing with Motown label, the same year that I was born. The name [...] alludes to this species being one of five syntopic congeners."			
Sarsamphiascus titoi Karanovic, 2020	Crustacean	Tito Jackson	"The species is named in honour of Toriano Adaryll 'Tito' Jackson, second oldest of five brothers in the American music-group The Jackson 5."			
Sarsamphiascus jermainei Karanovic, 2020	Crustacean	Jermaine Jackson	"The species is named in honour of Jermaine La Jaune Jackson, third oldest of five brothers in the American music-group The Jackson 5."			
Sarsamphiascus marloni Karanovic, 2020	Crustacean	Marlon Jackson	"The species is named in honour of Marlon David Jackson, second youngest of five brothers in the American music-group The Jackson 5."			
Sarsamphiascus michaeli Karanovic, 2020	Crustacean	Michael Jackson	"The species is named in honour of Michael Joseph Jackson, the youngest of five brothers in the American music-group The Jackson 5. [...] This species is the most successful of all Korean congeners, both in abundance and distribution, just as Michael was the most successful of all of his siblings."			
Schistura sirindhornae Suvarnaraksha, 2015	Fish	Sirindhorn	"The species epithet honors Her Royal Highness Princess Maha Chakri Sirindhorn for her 60th birthday anniversary, her biodiversity conservation projects including a Plant Genetic Conservation Project Under the Royal Initiative of Her Royal Highness Princess Maha Chakri Sirindhorn, several projects in education and protein source security for rural communities, and many projects located in Nan Province, the type locality of this species."			
Selenacentrus Morris & Dietrich, 2016	Treehopper	Selena	A genus of treehoppers from Southwestern USA and Northern Mexico, whose name is "derived from the first name of the late Tejano music artist, Selena, with the suffix –centrus, a commonly employed term in centrotine taxonomy."			
Selenyphantes gaimani Silva-Moreira & Hormiga, 2021	Spider	Neil Gaiman	"The species epithet is an homage to Neil Gaiman, an English writer of short fiction, novels, graphic novels, audio theatre and films. Notable works include American Gods and Anansi Boys, where he features the spider god Anansi from Caribbean mythology as one of its characters. Most recently, he participated in the short documentary Sixteen legs about the Tasmanian cave spider, Hickmania troglodytes (Higgins & Petterd, 1883), where he wrote and voiced the short story A visit to the queen of the dark." Gaiman tweeted "I'm amazed. I'm a spider. Well, sort of. (Thank you to whoever named it!)"			
Senecio anastasioi Montesinos	Flowering plant	Trey Anastasio	"The specific epithet refers to the musician Ernest Joseph "Trey" Anastasio III (born 30 September 1964), honouring the fifty-eight birthday of that American singer, songwriter, composer and musician who is best known for the band Phish.[...] I enjoyed Trey Anastasio's music during my research, and it greatly facilitated my work."			
Sericomyrmex radioheadi Ješovnik & Schultz, 2017	Ant	Radiohead	"This species is named after the English rock band Radiohead as an acknowledgement of their longstanding efforts in environmental activism, especially in raising climate-change awareness, and in honor of their music, which is an excellent companion during long hours at the microscope while conducting taxonomic revisions of ants."			
Serphites hynemani † McKellar & Engel, 2011	Wasp	Jamie Hyneman	A fossil species found in Canadian amber from the Cretaceous of Grassy Lake, Alberta. "The specific epithet is a patronym for Jamie Hyneman, co-host of the television series Mythbusters, in reference to the 'walrus moustache' formed by the clypeal and mandibular setae in this species."			
Serratoterga larsoni Johnson, 1991	Butterfly	Gary Larson	Subsequently, synonymised with Calycopis pisis (Godman & Salvin, 1887).			
Seticotasteromimus brunomanseri Germann, 2021	Weevil	Bruno Manser	A species native to Malaysian Borneo "dedicated to Bruno Manser (1954–2000?), Swiss environmental activist from Basel, to honour his indispensable activism for rainforest preservation and against deforestation by timber companies, and defender for the human rights of indigenous peoples. Bruno Manser disappeared in 2000 in Malaysia."			
Silvestritermes almirsateri Rocha & Cancello, 2012	Termite	Almir Sater	A species from Brazil "Named in honour of Almir Sater, a Brazilian singer, songwriter, and guitarist from the state of Mato Grosso do Sul, Brazil, for his musical and poetic descriptions of the Pantanal. The Pantanal is an important wetland ecosystem of South America, where all the samples of this species were collected."			
Sinusichnus priesti † Kappel, 2003	Crustacean trace fossil	Judas Priest	An ichnospecies identified from the Cretaceous of Germany.			
Sirindhorn thailandiensis Adamski & Malikul, 2003	Butterfly	Sirindhorn	This species is native to Thailand.			
Sirindhorna † Shibata, Jintasakul, Azuma & You, 2015	Dinosaur	Sirindhorn	A basal hadrosauroid dinosaur from the Lower Cretaceous Khok Kruat Formation of Thailand. "Dedication to the Princess Maha Chakri Sirindhorn, Thailand, for her contribution to the support and encouragement of paleontology in Thailand."			
Sirindhornia (plant) H.A.Pedersen & Suksathan	Orchid	Sirindhorn	A genus of orchids native to Thailand, Myanmar and Yunnan, China. "Her Royal Highness Princess Maha Chakri Sirindhorn of Thailand has generously granted us permission to name this new orchid genus after her. We feel very honoured by this privilege, and we take pleasure in this opportunity to gratefully acknowledge H.R.H.'s inestimable contributions to the conservation of indigenous plants."			
Sirindhornia (moth) Pinkaew & Muadsub, 2014	Moth	Sirindhorn				
Songkania smithi † Adrain & Chatterton, 1995	Trilobite	Geoff Smith	Thirteen Canadian species were named, in a series of four papers, after members of the Edmonton Oilers team that won the 1990 Stanley Cup (See also species in genera Aulacopleura, Cyphaspis, Harpidella, Maurotarion and Otarion).			
Sonoma colberti Ferro, 2016	Beetle	Stephen Colbert	"named for Stephen Colbert (silent "t") a character created by Stephen Tyrone Colbert (sounded "t"), an author, philosopher, humanitarian, champion of science, and humorist."			
Sonoma rossellinae Ferro, 2016	Beetle	Isabella Rossellini	"named after Isabella Fiorella Elettra Giovanna Rossellini, an Italian actress and film maker who wrote and starred in Green Porno, a series of short films on animal sexual behavior."			
Sonoma stewarti Ferro, 2016	Beetle	Jon Stewart	"named for Jon Stewart (born Jonathan Stuart Leibowitz), a humanitarian, champion of science, and humorist best known for reintroducing skepticism and intelligence to news reporting through a television program called The Daily Show."			
Spathaspora domphillipsii Santos et al. (2023)	Yeast	Dom Phillips	A species collected in the Amazon rainforest, where Phillips was murdered, and named in his honor as a tribute for his work in defence of the environment.			
Sphaeropthalma arnalduri Pitts, 2010	Wasp	Arnaldur Indriðason	A velvet ant from the Sierra Nevada, California, "Named after Arnaldur Indriðason (1961 to present) who is an Icelandic writer of crime fiction and is currently best known for his detective novels involving Detective Erlender Sveinsson."			
Sphyrna alleni Gonzalez et al., 2024	Shark	Paul Allen	"named after Paul G. Allen (1953–2018) who was an investor, co-founder of Microsoft, and philanthropist who, through the Paul G. Allen Family Foundation, has generously supported shark research and conservation."			
Spintharus barackobamai Agnarsson & Van Patten, 2018	Spider	Barack Obama	"The species epithet honours former US president Barack Obama for the dignity, humanitarianism, statesmanship and respect he brought to the oval office; a true world leader."			
Spintharus leonardodicaprioi Van Patten & Agnarsson, 2018	Spider	Leonardo DiCaprio	"The species epithet honours the talented actor Leonardo DiCaprio for his amazing acting, and, in particular, for his leading role in bringing awareness of the perils of global climate change to the public and politicians alike."			
Spintharus michelleobamaae Agnarsson & Sargeant, 2018	Spider	Michelle Obama	"The species epithet honours former first lady Michelle Obama who has long fought to defend human rights, fairness, and equality for all, with her characteristic dignity and grace."			
Stittella beeae † Westrop, Waskiewicz Poole & Adrain, 2010	Trilobite	Samantha Bee				
Streptocephalus sirindhornae Sanoamuang et al., 2000	Crustacean	Sirindhorn	A freshwater fairy shrimp native to Thailand.			
Strigiphilus garylarsoni Clayton, 1990	Louse	Gary Larson	"named in honor of cartoonist Gary Larson, in appreciation of the unique light he has shed on the workings of nature." In a letter to Larson, Clayton praised him for "the enormous contribution that my colleagues and I feel you have made to biology through your cartoons." In his 1989 book The Prehistory of the Far Side, Larson stated, "I considered this an extreme honor. Besides, I knew no one was going to write and ask to name a new species of swan after me. You have to grab these opportunities when they come along."			
Strumigenys strummeri Tang & Guénard, 2023	Ant	Joe Strummer				
Struthoscelis christianafigueresae Metz, 2017	Moth	Christiana Figueres	A concealer moth from Costa Rica, "dedicated to Ms. Christiana Figueres in recognition of her decades of care of the ACG biosocio-economic environment, as well as that for Costa Rica, and now for the world as inspiration and leader of the United Nations (UN) climate effort by being the energetic and highly successful Executive Director of the UN Framework Convention on Climate Change (UNFCCC) of the Paris Accords for the World."			
Syzygium sirindhorniae Chantar., Suksathan & Wongnak	Flowering plant	Sirindhorn	A species of the myrtle family native to northern Thailand, named "in honour of Her Royal Highness Princess Maha Chakri Sirindhorn of Thailand who has long been interested in botanical diversity. She has initiated the Plant Genetic Conservation Project under The Royal Initiative of H.R.H. Princess Maha Chakri Sirindhorn." The vernacular name "Rat-cha-rat" was given by Princess Sirindhorn herself.			
Talabrica elotroyoae † Santelli & Del Río, 2014	Bivalve	El Otro Yo	A fossil species from the Miocene of Patagonia.			
Tanidromites nightwishorum † Klompmaker, Starzyk, Fraaije & Schweigert, 2020	Crustacean	Nightwish	A fossil crab from the Jurassic of eastern Austria. "Named in honor of the members of the symphonic metal band Nightwish (Troy Donockley, Kai Hahto, Marko Hietala, Tuomas Holopainen, Floor Jansen, and Emppu Vuorinen), in particular for their 2015 album Endless Forms Most Beautiful about the evolution of life."			
Tarantobelus jeffdanielsi Schurkman et al., 2022	Roundworm	Jeff Daniels	An often fatal parasite of tarantulas, "named after American actor Jeff Daniels, whose character in the 1990 film Arachnophobia kills the queen spider and saves the fictional town of Canaima from a deadly infestation of spiders." "His character in the film is a spider killer, which is exactly what these nematodes are," said one of the parasitologists involved in the discovery. Daniels joked "When I first heard a new species of nematode had been named after me, I thought, 'Why? Is there a resemblance?'" "Honestly, I was honored by their homage to me and Arachnophobia," the actor added, noting that it "made me smile." He then quipped, "And of course, in Hollywood, you haven't really made it until you've been recognized by those in the field of parasitology."			
Taraxella chrisfehni Ni, Yu & Zhang, 2025	Spider	Chris Fehn	"The specific epithet is derived from Chris Fehn, the percussionist and backing vocalist for the heavy metal band Slipknot from 1998 to 2019; the Pinocchio-style mask that Chris Fehn usually wears during his performances resembles the tegular apophysis 'Y' on the palpal bulb of the new species."			
Tarsius sirindhornae † Chaimanee et al., 2011	Tarsier	Sirindhorn	Fossil species of tarsier from the Miocene of Thailand, named "in honour of Her Royal Highness Princess Maha Chakri Sirindhorn, who has repeatedly demonstrated her great interest in the palaeontological richness of her country."			
Tasmanicosa hughjackmani Framenau & Baehr, 2016	Spider	Hugh Jackman	"The specific epithet for this wolf spider species honours the Australian actor Hugh Jackman, who played Wolverine in the X-Men film series, for his extraordinary artistic skills and more so for his numerous philanthropic activities." The species is endemic to Australia, and the common name "wolverine wolf spider" was proposed by its discoverers.			
Teleogramma obamaorum Stiassny & Alter, 2015	Fish	Barack Obama and Michelle Obama	"We name this new cichlid species from the freshwater heart of the African continent in honor of U.S. President barack obama and First lady Michelle obama, in recognition of their commitment to science education, development, gender equality, and self-reliance for all peoples of African nations, and their dedication to environmental conservation in Africa and beyond."			
Terebella banksyi Lavesque, Daffe, Londoño-Mesa & Hutchings, 2021	Polychaete worm	Banksy	"This species is dedicated to Banksy, a brilliant street artist whose graphic work always conveys powerful messages."			
Terebellides sepultura Garraffoni & Lana, 2003	Polychaete worm	Sepultura	"The species is named to honour Sepultura, the best Brazilian heavy metal band."			
Teresirogas billbrysoni Quicke & van Achterberg, 2014	Wasp	Bill Bryson	An Australian parasitoid wasp "Named after the [sic] William Bryson, author of Down Under about a trip through Australia as well as many other entertaining works."			
Testudacarus harrisi O'Neill & Dowling, 2016	Mite	Sam Harris	"after Samuel Benjamin Harris, the American author, philosopher, and co-founder of Project Reason. Sam Harris, more than any speaker and author, has challenged my (JCO) views and assumptions and kept me on my toes."			
Tetramorium adamsi Hita Garcia & Fisher, 2012	Ant	Douglas Adams				
Thaipotamon chulabhorn Naiyanetr, 1993	Crustacean	Chulabhorn	A freshwater crab native to Thailand, named "in honour of Her Royal Highness Princess Chulabhorn, [on] the occasion of Her Royal Highness's 36th birthday, as a token of respect, and in recognition of Her Highness's important contribution to the promotion of education, science and public health in Thailand, as well as Her efforts to bring an acceptable balance between industrial development and nature conservation. Her Royal Highness graciously permitted the use of Her name for this interesting species with its intriguing colour pattern."			
Thepparatia Phuph.	Flowering plant	Sirindhorn	A monotypic genus of mallows described from a holotype collected in Thailand. "The genus is, by gracious permission dedicated to Her Royal Highness Princess Maha Chakri Sirindhorn, who has made great efforts to conserve the natural environments in Thailand. Thepparat is her royal title."			
Tianchisaurus nedegoapeferima † Dong, 1993	Dinosaur	Sam Neill, Laura Dern, Jeff Goldblum, Richard Attenborough, Bob Peck, Martin Ferrero, Ariana Richards, and Joseph Mazzello	Actors involved in the 1993 film Jurassic Park: Neill, Dern, Goldblum, Attenborough, Peck, Ferrero, Richards, and Mazzello. The type specimen was informally referred to as "Jurassosaurus". The species name was proposed by director Steven Spielberg.			
Tigriopus sirindhornae Chullasorn, Dahms & Klangsin, 2013	Crustacean	Sirindhorn	A marine copepod described from specimens collected in Thailand.			
Tinaegeria romanmacayai Metz, 2020	Moth	Román Macaya	"named in honor of Dr. Román Macaya, in recognition of his proactive and intense support for BioAlfa, the initiating biodiversity inventory of Costa Rica, while simultaneously being the Costa Rican ambassador to the United States."			
Torrenticola manni Fisher et al., 2017	Mite	Charles C. Mann	"Named in honor of author Charles Mann, whose books about the peopling of North America (e.g., 1491, 1493) breach history and venture into human ecology. They are an inspiration to confronting misconceptions and a reminder that even seemingly well-known history, whether archeological or evolutionary, is in fact usually not well-known. His books are a battle cry to never cease learning and to always question."			
Torrenticola pollani Fisher et al., 2017	Mite	Michael Pollan	"Named in honor of author Michael Pollan, whose influential books breach mere accounts on food culture and enter insightful discussions of human ecology."			
Torrenticola tysoni Fisher et al., 2017	Mite	Neil Degrasse Tyson	"Named in honor of Neil Degrasse Tyson for his efforts in popularizing cosmology and science in general with Cosmos: A Spacetime Odyssey (2014), which was a worthy update to Carl Sagan's Cosmos: A Personal Voyage (1980)."			
Torvosaurus gurneyi † Hendrickx & Mateus, 2014	Dinosaur	James Gurney	Gurney created and illustrated the Dinotopia books.			
Tosanoides obama Pyle, Greene & Kosaki, 2016	Fish	Barack Obama	The species was named after former US President Barack Obama in honor of his efforts to preserve natural environments.			
Trachyoribates viktortsoii Ermilov, 2019	Mite	Viktor Tsoi	"The species is named after the late Viktor Robertovich Tsoi (Russian: Виктор Робертович Цой; 21 June 1962–15 August 1990), the famous Soviet rock musician, singer and songwriter who co-founded the Kino rock band, one of the most popular and musically influential bands in the history of Russian music. Tsoi's songs long have had special significance for the author, and continue to provide a musical background for his scientific research."			
Traumatomutilla pilkingtoni Bartholomay & Williams, 2019	Wasp	Karl Pilkington	"This remarkable species, is named in honor of the British philosopher, comedian, radio personality, presenter, author, and actor Karl Pilkington due to its rounded orange head."			
Trigona (Tetragonula) sirindhornae Michener & Boongird, 2004	Bee	Sirindhorn	A species native to Thailand, dedicated "to HRH Princess Sirindhorn on the occasion of her 48th birthday celebrations. We wish to convey our gratitude to HRH for graciously granting permission to name the species after her". Tetragonula, formerly a subgenus of Trigona, was subsequently elevated to genus status, making the valid name of the species Tetragonula sirindhornae.			
Trigonostomum vanmecheleni Artois, Schockaert, Beenaerts & Reygel, 2013	Flatworm	Koen Vanmechelen	A rhabdocoel flatworm collected from the channels of Venice and described by scientists of Hasselt University, "Dedicated to the Belgian conceptual artist Koen Vanmechelen, for his continuous efforts to unite science and art, cherishing diversity in all its aspects as a central theme."			
Trogolaphysa gisbertae Brito & Zeppelini, 2022	Springtail	Gisberta Salce Júnior	This species is native to Brazil and named as an "Honor to Gisberta Salce Júnior, Brazilian woman, murdered in 2006 (Porto, Portugal) in a transphobia crime."			
Trypanosoma irwini McInnes et al., 2009	Protist	Steve Irwin	A parasite of koalas.			
Tsinania sirindhornae † Wernette & Hughes, 2023	Trilobite	Sirindhorn	A fossil from the Cambrian of Thailand, "Named in honour of Her Royal Highness Princess Maha Chakri Sirindhorn of Thailand for her support of science and technology, and particularly for her interest in palaeontology."			
Tupacsala † Petrulevičius & Gutiérrez, 2016	Dragonfly	Túpac Amaru II and Milagro Sala	Fossil Odonatoptera from the Carboniferous of La Rioja Province, Argentina. "Dedicated to the memory of José Gabriel Condorcanqui Noguera, "Túpac" Amaru II (1738-1781) and to Milagro Amalia Ángela "Sala" (1963-). Túpac Amaru in 1780-1781 initiated a revolt against [the] Spanish State and its rules. He was tortured (forced to witness the execution of the sentences imposed on his family), executed and quartered to be exposed. Milagro Sala is a prominent Argentine social leader, Secretary of the "Organización Barrial Túpac Amaru" and Parliamentary of the Parlasur imprisoned with other members of the organization since January 16, 2016."; The type species is named Tupacsala niunamenos, "Dedicated to "Ni una menos" (Not one [woman] less), a collective against gender violence. It is a collective campaign that arose from the need to say "enough femicides", because in Argentina every 30 hours a woman is killed just [for] being a woman."			
Tympanoctomys kirchnerorum Teta, Pardiñas, Sauthier & Gallardo, 2014	Rodent	Néstor Kirchner and Cristina Fernández de Kirchner	"The idea of this tribute arises as a result of the fact that the governments of both presidents were characterized by an active policy of promoting science, the repatriation of scientists, and above all, by the creation of a Ministry of Science, Technology and Productive Innovation."			
Typhlamia genesis Gellert, Palero & Błażewicz, 2022	Crustacean	Genesis	"The generic name Typhlamia is linked with the record 'The Lamia' from the album The Lamb Lies Down on Broadway from the music band Genesis. Name of species after the Genesis music band."			
Tytthonyx stadili † Fanti & Damgaard, 2019	Beetle	Christian Stadil	A fossil soldier beetle found in Dominican amber from the Miocene of the Cordillera Septentrional. "In honor of the owner and CEO of Thornico Group and chairman for the fashion brand Hummel, Christian Nicholas Stadil."			
Uma thurmanae Derycke, Gottscho, Mulcahy, & De Queiroz, 2020	Lizard	Uma Thurman	"The specific name honors Uma Karuna Thurman (born April 29, 1970), an American actress and pop icon, for her philanthropic contributions and outreach promoting wildlife conservation and human rights."			
Ummidia gabrieli Godwin & Bond, 2021	Spider	Peter Gabriel	"in honor of musician and human rights activist Peter Gabriel."			
Ummidia neilgaimani Godwin & Bond, 2021	Spider	Neil Gaiman	"in honor of Neil Gaiman, author of a number of fantasy and horror books with spider-based characters. In one book, American Gods, the main character is tied to the World Tree located "one hour south of Blacksburg," not far from the type locality of this species."			
Unruhdinium Gottschling, 2017	Protist	N. U. Unruh	One of two genera of dinoflagellates named concurrently after the two permanent members of Einstürzende Neubauten (see also Blixaea).			
Uperoleia gurrumuli Catullo & Keogh, 2021	Frog	Geoffrey Gurrumul Yunupingu	Gurrumul was born in the Wessel Islands, which this rare species is endemic to.			
Uvariopsis dicaprio Cheek & Gosline	Flowering plant	Leonardo DiCaprio	"This threatened and spectacular tree is named for the American actor and conservationist Leonardo DiCaprio, who, through several months in 2020, lobbied extensively on social media to draw attention to threats for the numerous rare Ebo species from the logging concession that had been announced at Ebo earlier that year. The concession was cancelled in August 2020, surely partly due to his efforts."			
Vatica najibiana Ummul-Nazrah	Flowering plant	Najib Razak	An endangered tree species endemic to Peninsular Malaysia, "named in honour of the Prime Minister of Malaysia, Dato' Sri Mohd Najib bin Tun Abdul Razak, for his strong interest in nature conservation and protection of the environment."			
Websteroprion † Eriksson et al., 2017	Polychaete worm	Alex Webster	A genus of fossil bobbit worms from the Devonian of Ontario, Canada, notable for their large size, "Named after Alex Webster – a 'giant' of a bass player – combined with 'prion' meaning saw."			
Wormaldia menchuae Muñoz-Quesada & Holzenthal, 2015	Caddisfly	Rigoberta Menchú	A species native to Guatemala, "named in honor of Rigoberta Menchú Tum, the Guatemalan and Mayan Quiché Indian and winner of the 1992 Nobel Peace Prize, in recognition of her outstanding campaign for human rights, especially for indigenous peoples."			
Xanthosomnium Wahl & Sime, 2002	Wasp	Tangerine Dream	"The genus is named after the musical group Tangerine Dream, the choice of discriminating ichneumonologists. From the Greek xanthos, yellow or yellowish-red (the closest equivalent to 'tangerine' in a classical language) and the Latin somnium, dream."			
Xestochironomus dickinsoni Pinho & Souza, 2013	Fly	Bruce Dickinson				
Xestochironomus virgoferreae Pinho & Souza, 2013	Fly	Iron Maiden	"Virgo Ferrea" is Latin for "Iron Maiden".			
Xyloplax princealberti Payne et al., 2023	Sea daisy	Albert II, Prince of Monaco	"This species honors His Serene Highness Prince Albert II of Monaco for his efforts to protect the marine environment through the Prince Albert II of Monaco Foundation."			
Yaginumaella daolangi C. Wang, Mi & Li, 2025	Spider	Dao Lang (singer)	This species is native to Sichuan, birthplace of Dao Lang.			
Zasphinctus ndouri Hita Garcia & Gómez, 2025	Ant	Youssou N'Dour	This species was described from specimens collected in Niokolo-Koba National Park, Senegal.			
Zasphinctus obamai Hita Garcia et al., 2017	Ant	Barack Obama	"This species is named in honour of Barack Hussein Obama, the 44th President of the United States of America. We want to acknowledge his important efforts undertaken for the conservation of fragile natural habitats around the globe. Also, the type locality of Z. obamai is geographically close to the hometown of Obama's paternal family in Western Kenya."			
Zingiber sirindhorniae Triboun & Keerat.	Flowering plant	Sirindhorn	A species of ginger plant native to Loei Province in northern Thailand. "The specific epithet honours Her Royal Highness Princess Sirindhorn of Thailand who has taken a keen interest in the conservation of plants." The vernacular name "Aiyarit" (ไอยริศ) was given by Princess Sirindhorn herself.			

== See also ==
- List of bacterial genera named after personal names
- List of rose cultivars named after people
- List of taxa named by anagrams
- List of organisms named after the Harry Potter series
