= Itaqui (disambiguation) =

Itaqui is a municipality in the state of Rio Grande do Sul, Brazil.

Itaqui may also refer to:

- Porto do Itaqui, port in São Luís, Maranhão, Brazil
- Itaqui (footballer, born 1973), Jesus Cleiton Pereira da Silva, Brazilian football right-back
- Itaqui (footballer, born 1988), Odacir Pereira da Silva, Brazilian football left-back
- Itaqui (footballer, born 1990), Gerethes Cleucir Souza da Silva, Brazilian football right-back
- Actinopus itaqui, species of mygalomorph spider
