= Actinopus piceus =

Scientific classification
- Kingdom: Animalia
- Phylum: Arthropoda
- Subphylum: Chelicerata
- Class: Arachnida
- Order: Araneae
- Infraorder: Mygalomorphae
- Family: Actinopodidae
- Genus: Actinopus
- Species: A. piceus

Binomial name
- Actinopus piceus (Ausserer, 1871)

Synonyms
- Pachyloscelis picea Ausserer, 1871

Species of spider

Actinopus piceus is a species of mygalomorph spider in the family Actinopodidae, the mouse spiders. It is endemic to Brazil and is known only from the male holotype.

== Taxonomy ==
The species was first described by the Austrian arachnologist Anton Ausserer in 1871 as Pachyloscelis picea, based on a male specimen from Brazil. Frederick Octavius Pickard-Cambridge transferred it to the genus Actinopus in 1896, the genus Pachyloscelis being treated as a junior synonym of Actinopus.

Actinopus, erected by Maximilian Perty in 1833 for the type species Actinopus tarsalis, is the most species-rich genus of the Actinopodidae and is confined to the Neotropics. In their 2020 revision of the genus, Miglio, Pérez-Miles and Bonaldo were unable to confidently place A. piceus and treated it as a species inquirenda, a name of uncertain application. In 2025, Dupérré and Tapia published the first photographs of the male holotype, illustrating its carapace, sternum and palp.

== Description ==
Members of Actinopus are stout, dark-coloured trapdoor spiders with a broad carapace and short, strongly spined legs. Because the genus shows marked sexual dimorphism and most species are described from only one sex, the structure of the male palpal bulb—including its keels and apophyses—provides the principal diagnostic characters. Actinopus piceus is known only from its male holotype, and no female has been associated with the species.

== Behaviour and ecology ==
As in other species of Actinopus, the female is presumed to spend its life inside a silk-lined burrow sealed by a hinged trapdoor, while adult males leave the burrow and wander in search of mates. This sex-biased behaviour means that males are encountered far more often than the cryptic, burrow-bound females, which helps explain why several Neotropical Actinopus species, including A. piceus, remain known only from male specimens.

== Distribution ==
Actinopus piceus is endemic to Brazil. No more precise type locality has been recorded.
