= A. excavatus =

A. excavatus may refer to:

- Abacetus excavatus, a ground beetle
- Actinopus excavatus, a spider found in Argentina
- Aristofusus excavatus, the apricot spindle, a sea snail found in the Americas
- Aster excavatus, a synonym of Eurybia divaricata, the white wood aster, a plant native to eastern North America
