= Actinopus buritiensis =

Scientific classification
- Domain: Eukaryota
- Kingdom: Animalia
- Phylum: Arthropoda
- Subphylum: Chelicerata
- Class: Arachnida
- Order: Araneae
- Infraorder: Mygalomorphae
- Family: Actinopodidae
- Genus: Actinopus
- Species: A. buritiensis

Binomial name
- Actinopus buritiensis Miglio, Pérez-Miles & Bonaldo, 2020

Species of spiders

Actinopus buritiensis is a species of mygalomorph spider in the family Actinopodidae. It can be found in Brazil.

The specific name refers to the municipality of Buriti, Maranhão, Brazil.
