= Actinopus robustus =

Scientific classification
- Domain: Eukaryota
- Kingdom: Animalia
- Phylum: Arthropoda
- Subphylum: Chelicerata
- Class: Arachnida
- Order: Araneae
- Infraorder: Mygalomorphae
- Family: Actinopodidae
- Genus: Actinopus
- Species: A. robustus

Binomial name
- Actinopus robustus (O. Pickard-Cambridge, 1892)

Species of spider

Actinopus robustus is a species of mygalomorph spiders in the family Actinopodidae. It is found in Panama.
