= Actinopus cucutaensis =

Actinopus cucutaensis Temporal range: Recent only (no fossil record)

Scientific classification
- Domain: Eukaryota
- Kingdom: Animalia
- Phylum: Arthropoda
- Subphylum: Chelicerata
- Class: Arachnida
- Order: Araneae
- Infraorder: Mygalomorphae
- Family: Actinopodidae
- Genus: Actinopus
- Species: A. cucutaensis

Binomial name
- Actinopus cucutaensis Mello-Leitão, 1941

Species of spider

Actinopus cucutaensis is a species of mygalomorph spiders in the family Actinopodidae. It is found in Colombia.
