= Actinopus guajara =

Scientific classification
- Kingdom: Animalia
- Phylum: Arthropoda
- Subphylum: Chelicerata
- Class: Arachnida
- Order: Araneae
- Infraorder: Mygalomorphae
- Family: Actinopodidae
- Genus: Actinopus
- Species: A. guajara

Binomial name
- Actinopus guajara Miglio, Pérez-Miles & Bonaldo, 2020

Species of spider

Actinopus guajara is a species of mygalomorph spider in the family Actinopodidae. It is currently known from the municipality of Guajará-Mirim in Rondônia, Brazil. The specific name guajara refers to its type locality.

The holotype, a male, measures 7.9 mm (0.3 in) in total length.
