= Plesiolena bonneti =

Scientific classification
- Kingdom: Animalia
- Phylum: Arthropoda
- Subphylum: Chelicerata
- Class: Arachnida
- Order: Araneae
- Infraorder: Mygalomorphae
- Family: Actinopodidae
- Genus: Plesiolena
- Species: P. bonneti

Binomial name
- Plesiolena bonneti (Zapfe, 1961)

Species of spider

Plesiolena bonneti is a species of mygalomorph spiders in the family Actinopodidae. It is found in Chile.
