= Actinopus candango =

Scientific classification
- Kingdom: Animalia
- Phylum: Arthropoda
- Subphylum: Chelicerata
- Class: Arachnida
- Order: Araneae
- Infraorder: Mygalomorphae
- Family: Actinopodidae
- Genus: Actinopus
- Species: A. candango

Binomial name
- Actinopus candango Miglio, Pérez-Miles & Bonaldo, 2020

Species of spider

Actinopus candango is a species of mygalomorph spider in the family Actinopodidae. It is endemic to Brazil and is known from the Federal District and Goiás, in the Central-West Region of the country. The specific name candango is a Portuguese word describing the builders of the city of Brasília, the type locality.

The holotype, a male, measures 17.4 mm (0.7 in) in total length, where a paratype female measures 27.9 mm (1.1 in).
