= Actinopus harti =

Scientific classification
- Domain: Eukaryota
- Kingdom: Animalia
- Phylum: Arthropoda
- Subphylum: Chelicerata
- Class: Arachnida
- Order: Araneae
- Infraorder: Mygalomorphae
- Family: Actinopodidae
- Genus: Actinopus
- Species: A. harti

Binomial name
- Actinopus harti Pocock, 1895

Species of spider

Actinopus harti is a species of mygalomorph spiders in the family Actinopodidae. It is found in Trinidad.
