= Missulena torbayensis =

Scientific classification
- Domain: Eukaryota
- Kingdom: Animalia
- Phylum: Arthropoda
- Subphylum: Chelicerata
- Class: Arachnida
- Order: Araneae
- Infraorder: Mygalomorphae
- Family: Actinopodidae
- Genus: Missulena
- Species: M. torbayensis

Binomial name
- Missulena torbayensis Main, 1996

Species of spider

Missulena torbayensis is a species of spider belonging to the family Actinopodidae. The spider is endemic to southwest Western Australia.
