= Actinopus hirsutus =

Scientific classification
- Kingdom: Animalia
- Phylum: Arthropoda
- Subphylum: Chelicerata
- Class: Arachnida
- Order: Araneae
- Infraorder: Mygalomorphae
- Family: Actinopodidae
- Genus: Actinopus
- Species: A. hirsutus

Binomial name
- Actinopus hirsutus Miglio, Pérez-Miles & Bonaldo, 2020

Species of spider

Actinopus hirsutus is a species of mygalomorph spider in the family Actinopodidae. It can be found in Brazil.

The specific name hirsutus is a Latin adjective meaning hairy.
