= Actinopus reznori =

Scientific classification
- Domain: Eukaryota
- Kingdom: Animalia
- Phylum: Arthropoda
- Subphylum: Chelicerata
- Class: Arachnida
- Order: Araneae
- Infraorder: Mygalomorphae
- Family: Actinopodidae
- Genus: Actinopus
- Species: A. reznori

Binomial name
- Actinopus reznori Miglio, Pérez-Miles & Bonaldo, 2020

Species of mygalomorph spider

Actinopus reznori is a species of mygalomorph spider in the family Actinopodidae. It can be found in the states of São Paulo, Rio de Janeiro and Bahia, Brazil. Actinopus reznori has a dark black body with legs averaging about 2 inches, and large round thorax.

The specific name reznori refers to the American composer Trent Reznor.
