= Missulena pruinosa =

Scientific classification
- Domain: Eukaryota
- Kingdom: Animalia
- Phylum: Arthropoda
- Subphylum: Chelicerata
- Class: Arachnida
- Order: Araneae
- Infraorder: Mygalomorphae
- Family: Actinopodidae
- Genus: Missulena
- Species: M. insignis

Binomial name
- Missulena insignis Levitt-Gregg, 1966

Species of spider

Missulena pruinosa, commonly known as the northern mouse spider, as others in its genus are also mouse spiders, is a species of spider belonging to the family Actinopodidae, native to Australia (Western Australia, Northern Territory).
