= Missulena tussulena =

Scientific classification
- Kingdom: Animalia
- Phylum: Arthropoda
- Subphylum: Chelicerata
- Class: Arachnida
- Order: Araneae
- Infraorder: Mygalomorphae
- Family: Actinopodidae
- Genus: Missulena
- Species: M. tussulena

Binomial name
- Missulena tussulena Goloboff, 1994

Species of spider

Missulena tussulena is a species of mygalomorph spiders in the family Actinopodidae. It is found in Chile.
