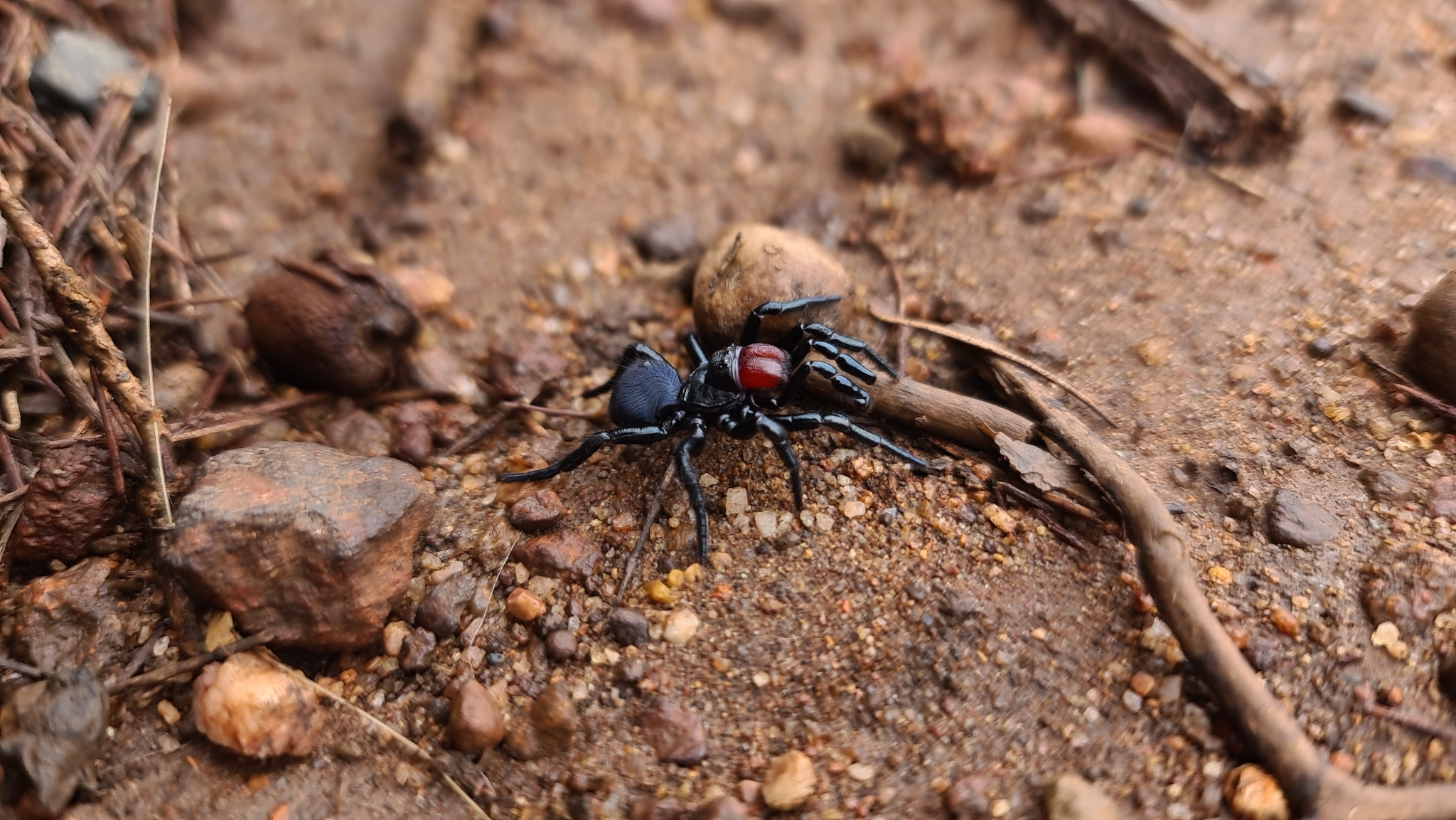

Scientific classification
- Domain: Eukaryota
- Kingdom: Animalia
- Phylum: Arthropoda
- Subphylum: Chelicerata
- Class: Arachnida
- Order: Araneae
- Infraorder: Mygalomorphae
- Family: Actinopodidae
- Genus: Missulena
- Species: M. hoggi

Binomial name
- Missulena hoggi Wommersley, 1943

= Missulena hoggi =

Species of spider

Missulena hoggi is a species of mygalomorph spiders in the family Actinopodidae. It is found in Western Australia. They are mostly black with reduced red marking relative to other mouse spiders.
