= Actinopus confusus =

Scientific classification
- Domain: Eukaryota
- Kingdom: Animalia
- Phylum: Arthropoda
- Subphylum: Chelicerata
- Class: Arachnida
- Order: Araneae
- Infraorder: Mygalomorphae
- Family: Actinopodidae
- Genus: Actinopus
- Species: A. confusus

Binomial name
- Actinopus confusus Miglio, Pérez-Miles & Bonaldo, 2020

Species of spider

Actinopus confusus is a species of mygalomorph spider in the family Actinopodidae. It can be found in Brazil.

The specific name confusus refers to the Serra das Confusões mountains.
