= Actinopus dubiomaculatus =

Scientific classification
- Domain: Eukaryota
- Kingdom: Animalia
- Phylum: Arthropoda
- Subphylum: Chelicerata
- Class: Arachnida
- Order: Araneae
- Infraorder: Mygalomorphae
- Family: Actinopodidae
- Genus: Actinopus
- Species: A. dubiomaculatus

Binomial name
- Actinopus dubiomaculatus Mello-Leitão, 1923

Species of spider

Actinopus dubiomaculatus is a species of mygalomorph spiders in the family Actinopodidae. It is found Brazil.
