= Missulena iugum =

Scientific classification
- Kingdom: Animalia
- Phylum: Arthropoda
- Subphylum: Chelicerata
- Class: Arachnida
- Order: Araneae
- Infraorder: Mygalomorphae
- Family: Actinopodidae
- Genus: Missulena
- Species: M. iugum

Binomial name
- Missulena iugum Greenberg, Huey, Framenau & Harms, 2021

Species of spider

Missulena iugum is a species of mouse spider in the Actinopodidae family. It is endemic to Australia. It was described in 2021, with the specific epithet iugum (Latin for ‘ridge’) referring to the strongly ridged cheliceral groove of the male spiders.

== Distribution and habitat ==
The species is found in the Murchison IBRA bioregion of Western Australia. The holotype specimen was obtained in Acacia shrubland.
