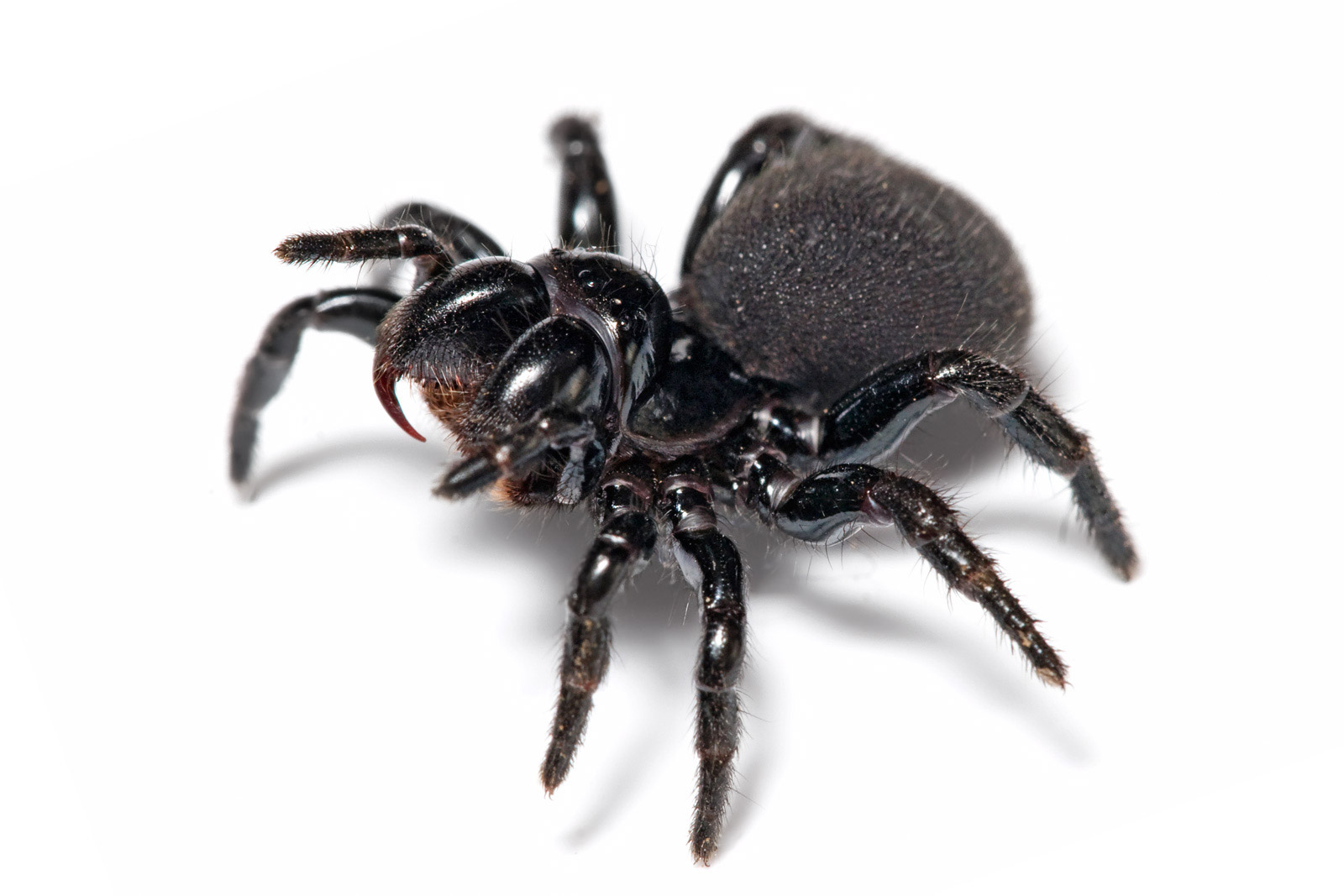
- Eastern mouse spider, Missulena bradleyi

Scientific classification
- Domain: Eukaryota
- Kingdom: Animalia
- Phylum: Arthropoda
- Subphylum: Chelicerata
- Class: Arachnida
- Order: Araneae
- Infraorder: Mygalomorphae
- Family: Actinopodidae
- Genus: Missulena
- Species: M. bradleyi

Binomial name
- Missulena bradleyi Rainbow, 1914

= Missulena bradleyi =

Species of spider from Australia known as the eastern mouse spider

Missulena bradleyi, also known as the eastern mouse spider, is a species of spider belonging to the family Actinopodidae. The spider is endemic to the eastern coast of Australia.

== History ==
William Joseph Rainbow described the eastern mouse spider in 1914 from a specimen collected in North Sydney by Henry Houghton Burton Bradley (1845–1918), president of the board of trustees of the Australian Museum at the time. Describing the "beautiful and strikingly marked" specimen as a "decided novelty", Rainbow named it in honour of its collector, whom he stated was the first collector of Australian spiders.

== Description ==
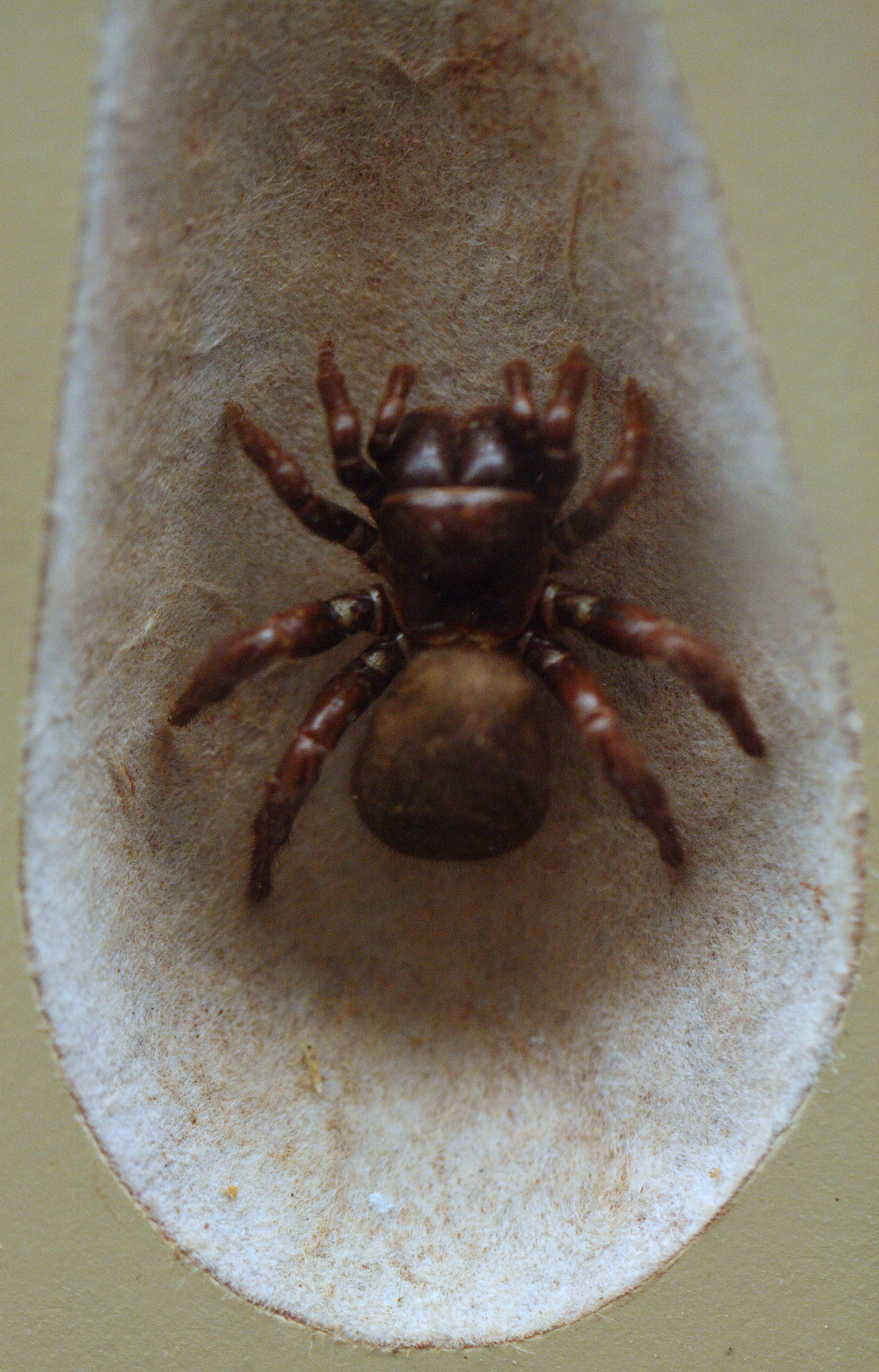
Female specimen in a model burrow on display in the Australian Museum

Eastern mouse spiders are often mistaken for Australian funnel-web spiders. The females are large and very strong, with powerful chelicerae. Their fangs often cross over slightly, while those of Australian funnel-web spiders remain parallel, and the latter often have a drop of venom on their fang tips and have longer spinnerets.

Males have a trapezium-shaped lighter patch that can be coloured from white and pale blue to mauve while females have abdomens that are coloured brown to almost black. Both sexes have a carapace that is a shiny black colour.

== Behaviour ==
The male, which has an all-black carapace and a pale bluish area on top of the abdomen, roams around in autumn and early winter looking for a mate. They sometimes fall into swimming pools when wandering. Cases of envenomations have peaked during this period.

The burrow can be found by brushing away loose soil in an area where they live until a flap of silk indicative of the entrance is found.

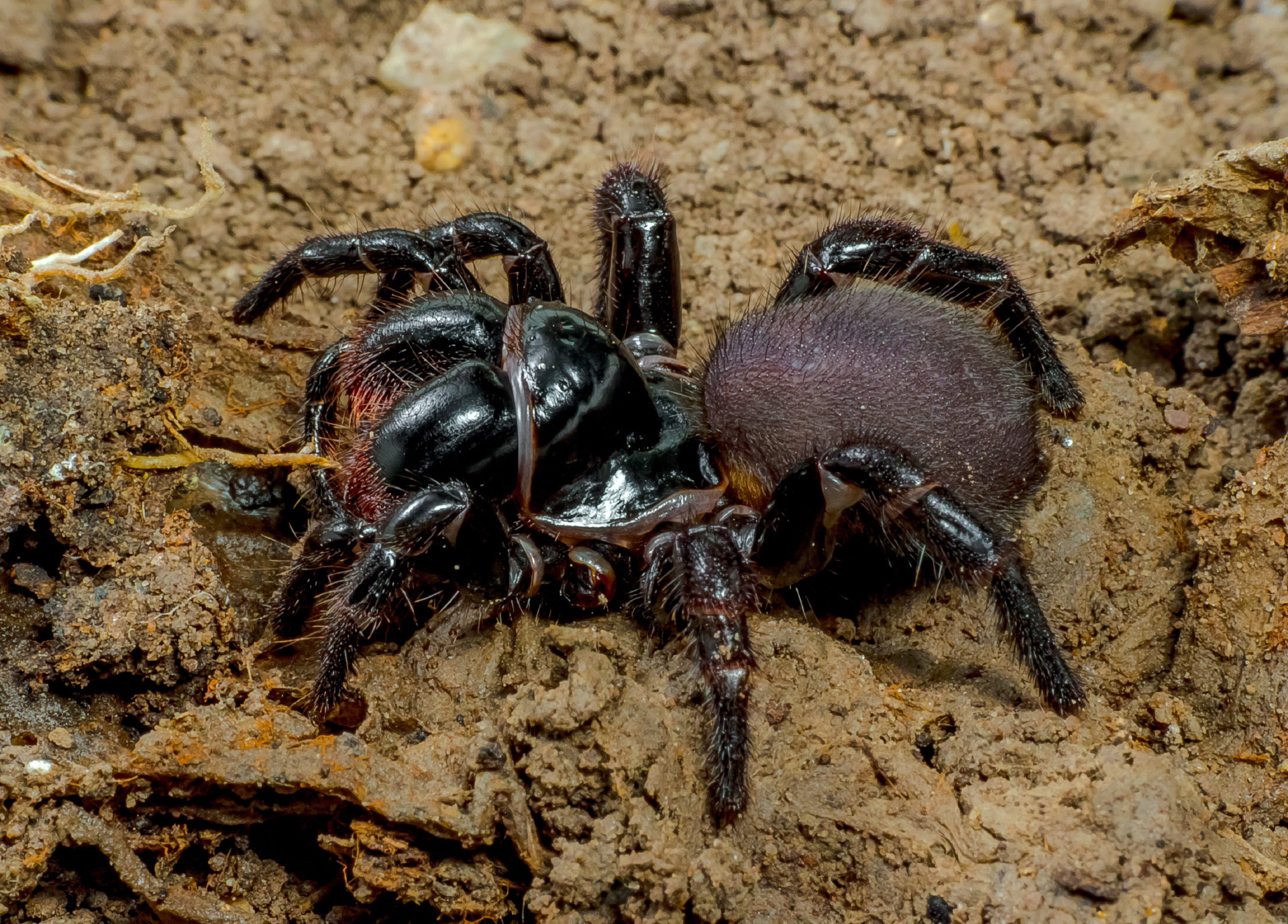
Eastern mouse spider in The Gap, Brisbane

== Envenomation ==
Common symptoms of eastern mouse spider bites are numbness and tingling at the bite site, sweating (diaphoresis), headache, and nausea generally. Although it appears to be the most dangerous member of the genus, serious envenomations by this species are relatively rare. Most bites documented in the medical literature did not require use of antivenom nor involve serious symptoms.

Severe envenomation occurred in only one case, a 19-month old child, who developed high blood pressure, muscle spasms, arched back, and unconsciousness. The child responded well to funnel-web spider antivenom. Their venom has been found to have toxins similar to the robustoxin found in Australian funnel-web spider venom, and Australian funnel-web spider antivenom has been found to be effective in treating severe mouse spider bites. Compared to the Australian funnel-web spider, however, the eastern mouse spider is far less aggressive towards humans, and may often give "dry" bites.
