= Missulena melissae =

Scientific classification
- Domain: Eukaryota
- Kingdom: Animalia
- Phylum: Arthropoda
- Subphylum: Chelicerata
- Class: Arachnida
- Order: Araneae
- Infraorder: Mygalomorphae
- Family: Actinopodidae
- Genus: Missulena
- Species: M. melissae

Binomial name
- Missulena melissae Miglio, Harms, Framenau & Harvey, 2014

Species of spider

Missulena melissae is a species of mygalomorph spiders in the family Actinopodidae. It is found in Western Australia. Its type locality is in Millstream Chichester National Park, 6 km N. of Millstream Homestead.
