= Missulena manningensis =

Scientific classification
- Kingdom: Animalia
- Phylum: Arthropoda
- Subphylum: Chelicerata
- Class: Arachnida
- Order: Araneae
- Infraorder: Mygalomorphae
- Family: Actinopodidae
- Genus: Missulena
- Species: M. manningensis

Binomial name
- Missulena manningensis Greenberg, Huey, Framenau & Harms, 2021

Species of spider

Missulena manningensis is a species of mouse spider in the Actinopodidae family. It is endemic to Australia. It was described in 2021, with the specific epithet manningensis referring to the type locality.

== Distribution and habitat ==
The species is found in the Murchison IBRA bioregion of Western Australia. It is known only from the Mount Manning area. The holotype specimen was obtained in tall open eucalypt woodland with mixed shrubs.
