= Actinopus caraiba =

Scientific classification
- Kingdom: Animalia
- Phylum: Arthropoda
- Subphylum: Chelicerata
- Class: Arachnida
- Order: Araneae
- Infraorder: Mygalomorphae
- Family: Actinopodidae
- Genus: Actinopus
- Species: A. caraiba

Binomial name
- Actinopus caraiba (Simon, 1889)

Species of spider

Actinopus caraiba is a species of mygalomorph spiders in the family Actinopodidae. It is found Venezuela.
