= Actinopus wallacei =

Scientific classification
- Domain: Eukaryota
- Kingdom: Animalia
- Phylum: Arthropoda
- Subphylum: Chelicerata
- Class: Arachnida
- Order: Araneae
- Infraorder: Mygalomorphae
- Family: Actinopodidae
- Genus: Actinopus
- Species: A. wallacei

Binomial name
- Actinopus wallacei F.O. Pickard-Cambridge, 1896

Species of spider

Actinopus wallacei is a species of mygalomorph spiders in the family Actinopodidae. It is found in Brazil.
