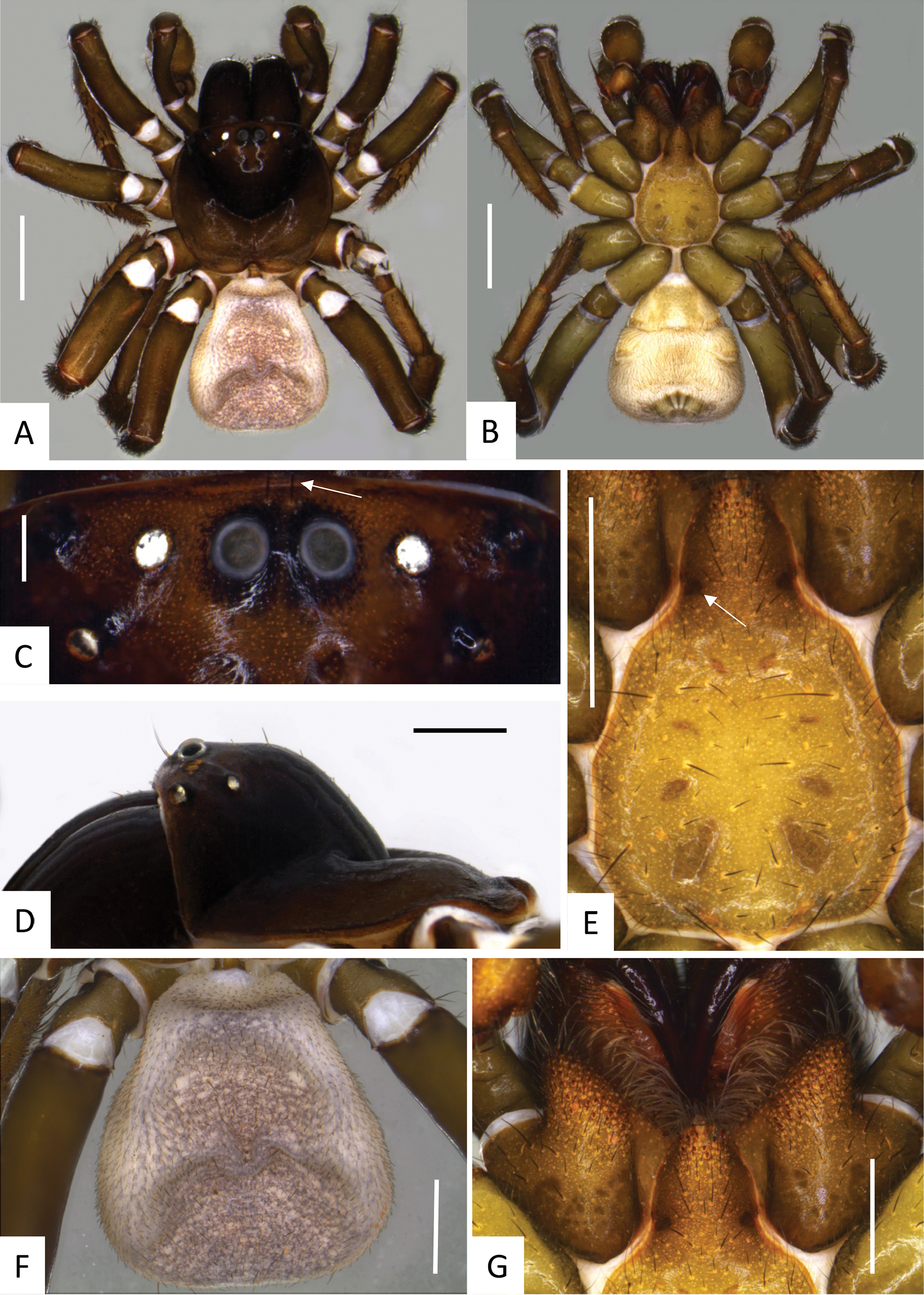

Scientific classification
- Domain: Eukaryota
- Kingdom: Animalia
- Phylum: Arthropoda
- Subphylum: Chelicerata
- Class: Arachnida
- Order: Araneae
- Infraorder: Mygalomorphae
- Family: Actinopodidae
- Genus: Missulena
- Species: M. harewoodi

Binomial name
- Missulena harewoodi Framenau & Harms, 2017

= Missulena harewoodi =

Species of spider

Missulena harewoodi is a species of mygalomorph spiders in the family Actinopodidae. It is found in Western Australia.
