= Actinopus longipalpis =

Scientific classification
- Domain: Eukaryota
- Kingdom: Animalia
- Phylum: Arthropoda
- Subphylum: Chelicerata
- Class: Arachnida
- Order: Araneae
- Infraorder: Mygalomorphae
- Family: Actinopodidae
- Genus: Actinopus
- Species: A. longipalpis

Binomial name
- Actinopus longipalpis C.L. Koch, 1842

Synonyms
- Actinopus liodon (Ausserer, 1875); Actinopus pindapoy Miglio, Pérez-Miles & Bonaldo, 2020; Pachyloscelis liodon Ausserer, 1875

Species of spider

Actinopus longipalpis is a species of mygalomorph spiders in the family Actinopodidae that was first described by C.L. Koch in 1842. It is found in Paraguay, Uruguay, and Argentina.
