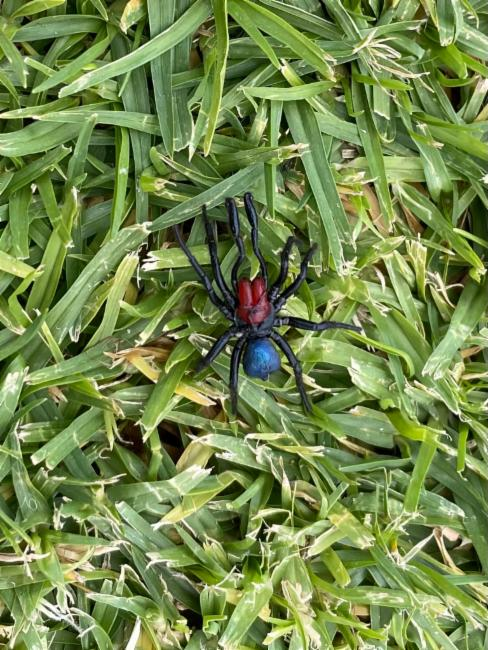

Scientific classification
- Domain: Eukaryota
- Kingdom: Animalia
- Phylum: Arthropoda
- Subphylum: Chelicerata
- Class: Arachnida
- Order: Araneae
- Infraorder: Mygalomorphae
- Family: Actinopodidae
- Genus: Missulena
- Species: M. insignis

Binomial name
- Missulena insignis (O. P-Cambridge, 1877)

Synonyms
- Eriodon insigne O. Pickard-Cambridge, 1877; Actinopus formosus Rainbow, 1896; Eriodon semicoccineum Simon, 1896; Eriodon rubrocapitata Rainbow, 1903; Missulena formosa (Rainbow, 1896)

= Missulena insignis =

Species of spider

Missulena insignis, commonly known as the lesser red-headed mouse spider, is a species of spider belonging to the family Actinopodidae native to Australia. The species name is derived from the Latin insignis "mark".

== Taxonomy ==
The species was first described by Octavius Pickard-Cambridge in 1877, as Eriodon insigne. Separately, William Joseph Rainbow described a male collected from Menindie, New South Wales as Actinopus formosus in 1896, formosus being Latin for "handsome/beautiful". H. Womersley in 1943 regarded Actinopus formosus as a synonym of Missulena occatoria. Barbara York Main in 1985 treated Actinopus formosus as a synonym of Missulena insignis, the position adopted by the World Spider Catalog. She considered that Womersley had partly confused M. occatoria and M. insignis, with M. occatoria only occurring in eastern Australia. According to Framenau et al., M. occatoria and M. insignis cannot be differentiated based on the original description.
