= Missulena ignea =

Scientific classification
- Domain: Eukaryota
- Kingdom: Animalia
- Phylum: Arthropoda
- Subphylum: Chelicerata
- Class: Arachnida
- Order: Araneae
- Infraorder: Mygalomorphae
- Family: Actinopodidae
- Genus: Missulena
- Species: M. ignea

Binomial name
- Missulena ignea Marsh, Stevens & Framenau, 2023

Species of spider

Missulena ignea is a species of mygalomorph spider in the family Actinopodidae. The species is known from Cape Range National Park, Western Australia.
