= Actinopus itacolomi =

Scientific classification
- Domain: Eukaryota
- Kingdom: Animalia
- Phylum: Arthropoda
- Subphylum: Chelicerata
- Class: Arachnida
- Order: Araneae
- Infraorder: Mygalomorphae
- Family: Actinopodidae
- Genus: Actinopus
- Species: A. itacolomi

Binomial name
- Actinopus itacolomi Miglio, Pérez-Miles & Bonaldo, 2020

Species of spider

Actinopus itacolomi is a species of mygalomorph spider in the family Actinopodidae. It can be found in Brazil.

The specific name itacolomi refers to the Itacolomi River.
