= Actinopus taragui =

Scientific classification
- Kingdom: Animalia
- Phylum: Arthropoda
- Subphylum: Chelicerata
- Class: Arachnida
- Order: Araneae
- Infraorder: Mygalomorphae
- Family: Actinopodidae
- Genus: Actinopus
- Species: A. taragui

Binomial name
- Actinopus taragui Ríos-Tamayo & Goloboff, 2018

Species of spider

Actinopus taragui is a species of mygalomorph spiders in the family Actinopodidae. It is found in Argentina.
