= Missulena rutraspina =

Scientific classification
- Domain: Eukaryota
- Kingdom: Animalia
- Phylum: Arthropoda
- Subphylum: Chelicerata
- Class: Arachnida
- Order: Araneae
- Infraorder: Mygalomorphae
- Family: Actinopodidae
- Genus: Missulena
- Species: M. rutraspina

Binomial name
- Missulena rutraspina Faulder, 1995

Species of spider

Missulena rutraspina is a species of mygalomorph spiders in the family Actinopodidae. It is found in Western Australia.
