= Henry Houghton Burton Bradley =

Australian arachnologist

Henry Houghton Burton Bradley (4 November 1845 – 23 November 1918) was an Australian arachnologist. He published papers on many types of spiders, in particular describing specimens found on the Chevert Expedition of 1875. Bradley corresponded with spider specialists in Europe and sent them collections.

A lawyer by profession, he was a keen horticulturalist and president of the Board of Trustees at the Australian Museum between 1913 and 1918. He was also the president of the Horticultural Society of New South Wales.

Bradley was a member of the Royal Horticultural Society of Great Britain; he was the first treasurer of the Linnean Society of New South Wales, a trustee of the Australian Museum for 40 years, and from 1913 to 1918 the Crown Trustee of that institution. Also interested in home defence, he was from its inception closely associated with the No. 9 Battery, Volunteer Garrison Artillery, rising to the rank of captain. In 1874 (then a lieutenant) he visited England, and attended a course of artillery instruction at Woolwich.

Bradley lived in North Sydney, and collected a local mouse spider. Described by William Rainbow as Missulena bradleyi. He remarked the "beautiful and strikingly marked" specimen as a "decided novelty". Rainbow named it in honour of its collector, whom he stated was the first collector of Australian spiders.

According to The Sydney Mail, Bradley was born in Surry Hills on 4 November 1845, and died at North Sydney on 23 November 1918.

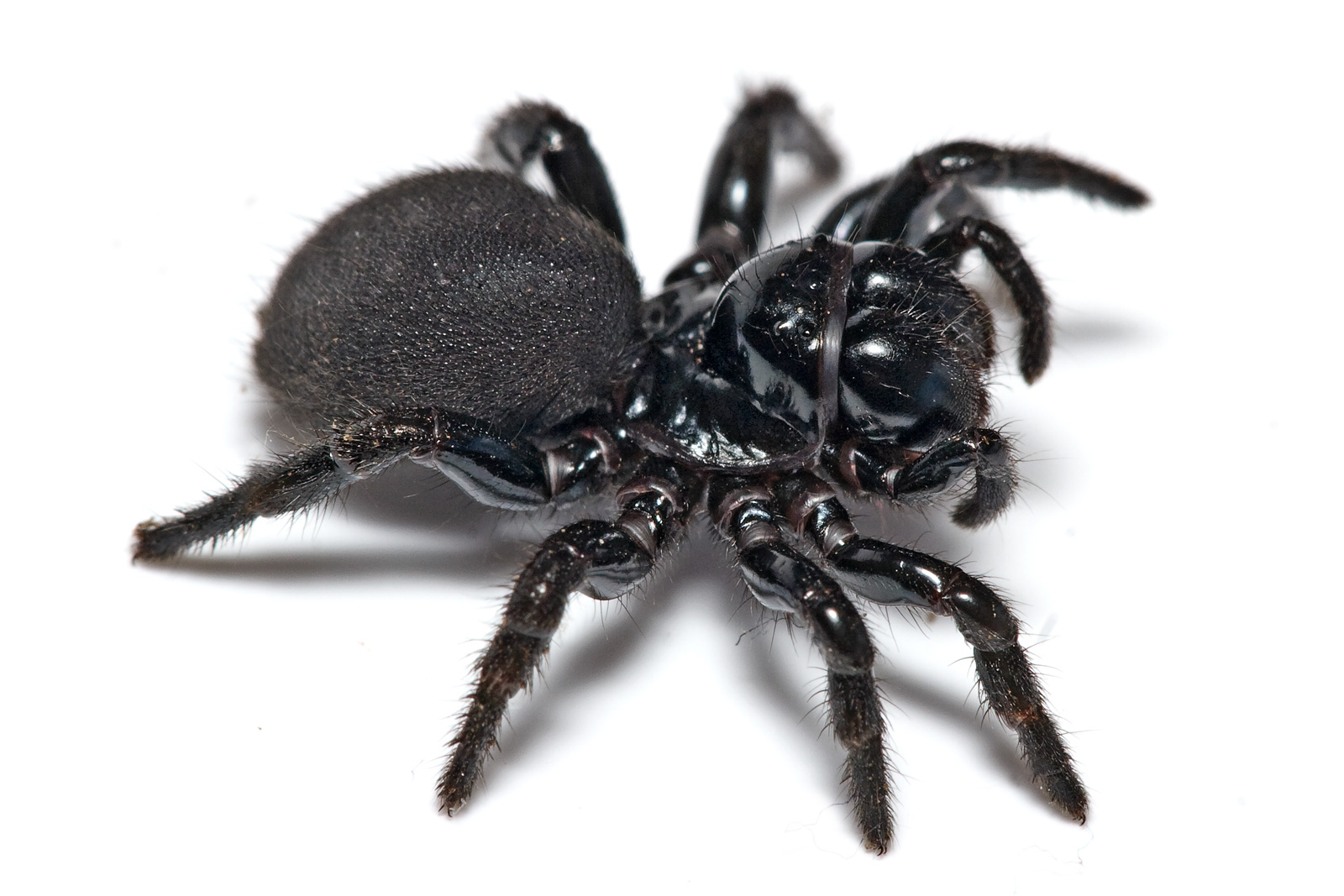
Missulena bradleyi
