= Missulena davidi =

Scientific classification
- Kingdom: Animalia
- Phylum: Arthropoda
- Subphylum: Chelicerata
- Class: Arachnida
- Order: Araneae
- Infraorder: Mygalomorphae
- Family: Actinopodidae
- Genus: Missulena
- Species: M. davidi

Binomial name
- Missulena davidi Greenberg, Huey, Framenau & Harms, 2021

Species of spider

Missulena davidi is a species of mouse spider in the Actinopodidae family. It is endemic to Australia. It was described in 2021, with the specific epithet davidi honouring the senior author's husband, David Greenberg.

== Distribution ==
The species is found in the Gascoyne and Pilbara IBRA bioregions of north-west Western Australia.
