= Actinopus caxiuana =

Scientific classification
- Kingdom: Animalia
- Phylum: Arthropoda
- Subphylum: Chelicerata
- Class: Arachnida
- Order: Araneae
- Infraorder: Mygalomorphae
- Family: Actinopodidae
- Genus: Actinopus
- Species: A. caxiuana

Binomial name
- Actinopus caxiuana Miglio, Pérez-Miles & Bonaldo, 2020

Species of spider

Actinopus caxiuana is a species of mygalomorph spider in the family Actinopodidae. It is endemic to Brazil and is known from the states of Pará and Tocantins, in the North Region of the country. The specific name caxiuana refers to the Caxiuanã National Forest where one paratype was collected.

The holotype, a male, measures 7.6 mm (0.3 in) in total length.
