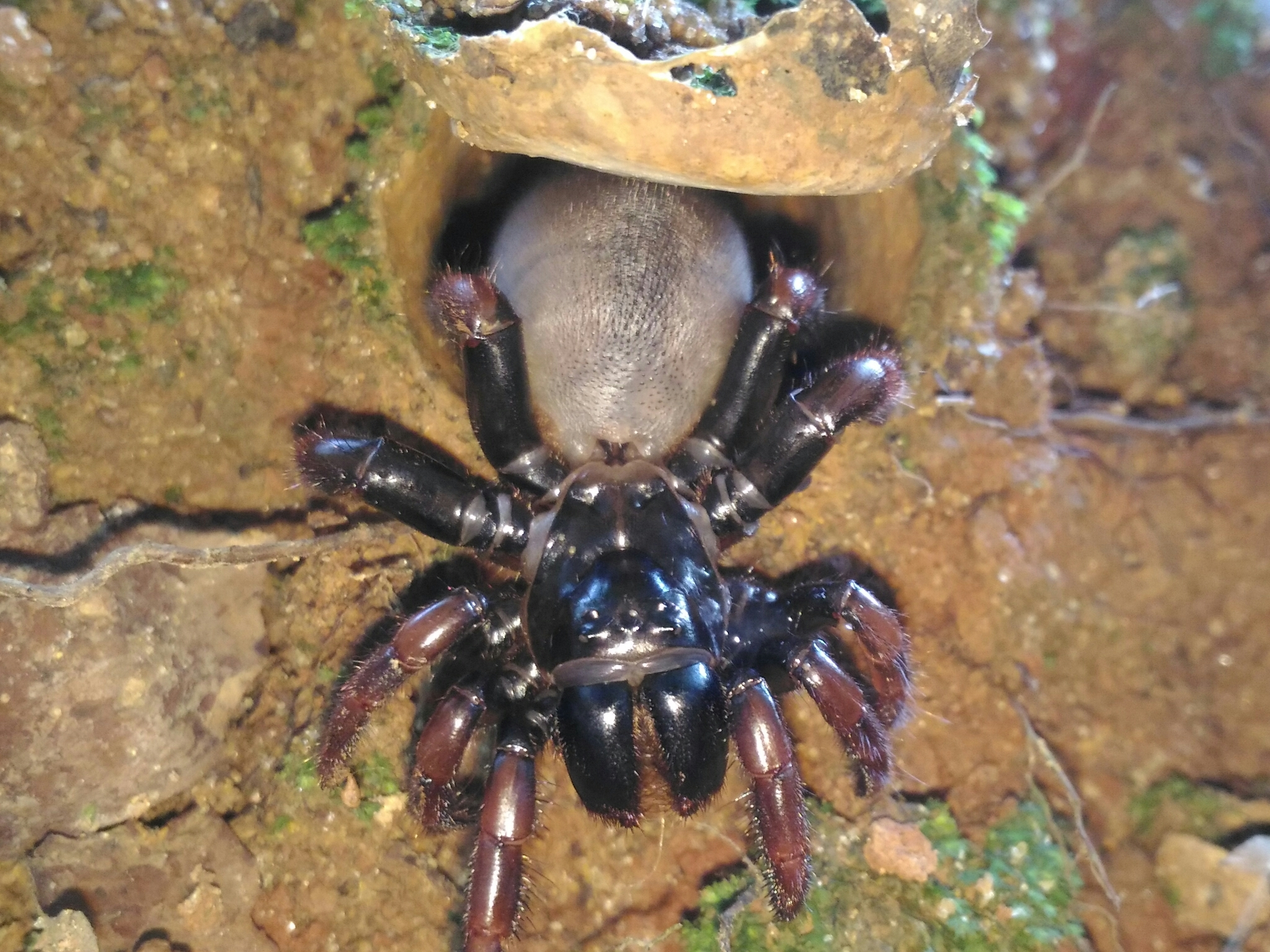
- female Actinopus pusilus
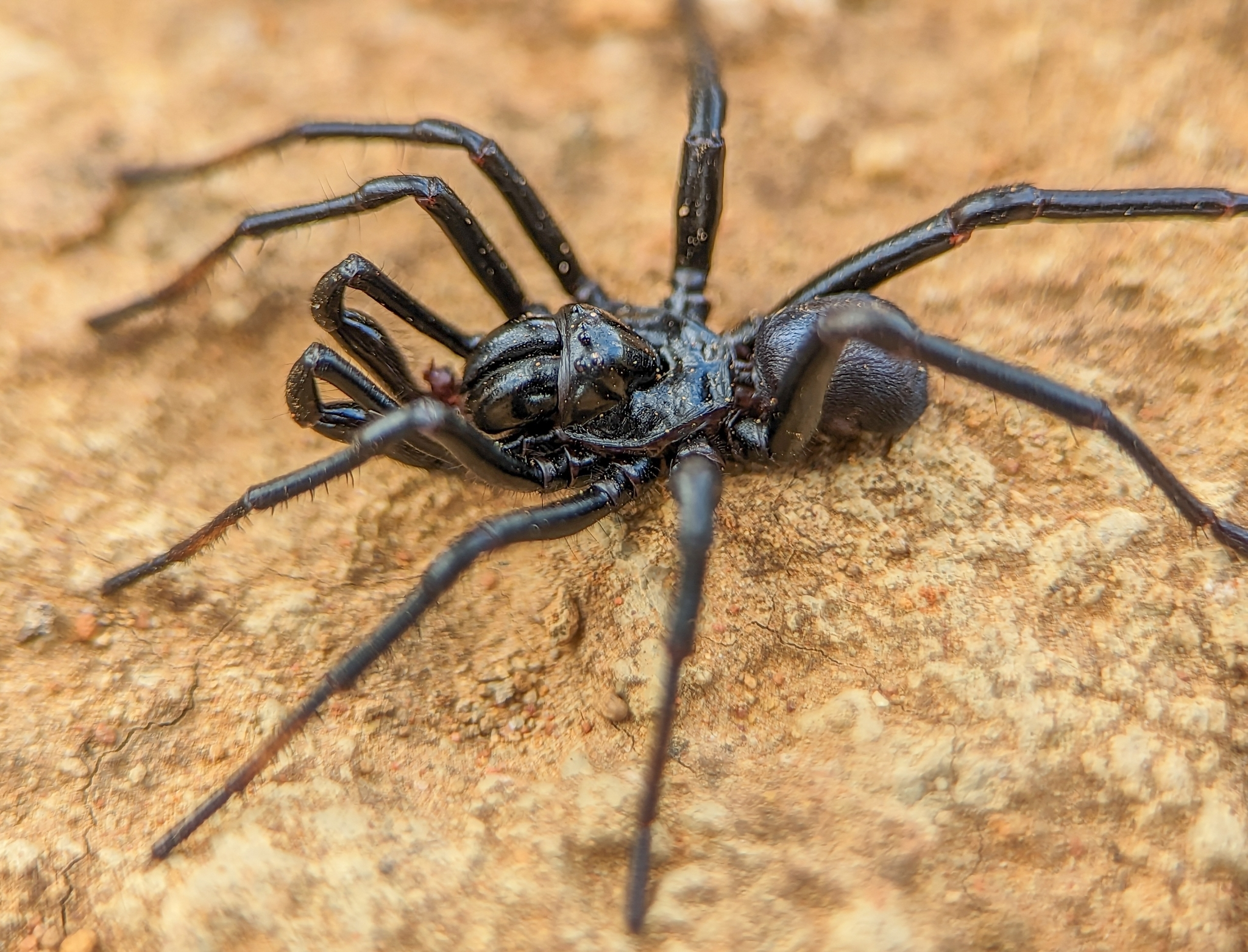
- male A. candango in Brazil

Scientific classification
- Kingdom: Animalia
- Phylum: Arthropoda
- Subphylum: Chelicerata
- Class: Arachnida
- Order: Araneae
- Infraorder: Mygalomorphae
- Family: Actinopodidae
- Genus: Actinopus; Perty, 1833

Type species
- A. tarsalis Perty, 1833

Species
- See text.

= Actinopus =

Genus of spiders

Actinopus is a genus of mygalomorph spiders in the family Actinopodidae. As such, they live in soil-covered burrows with a hinged top. The males wander about in search for females, which stay in their burrow for most of their life.

== Taxonomy ==
The genus was first described by Josef Anton Maximilian Perty in 1833 from the type species Actinopus tarsalis found in Brazil. The genus name comes from Ancient Greek ἀκτίς (aktís), meaning "ray, beam", and πούς (poús), meaning "foot", and thus, "ray foot". It is a senior synonym of Aussereria, Closterochilus, Pachyloscelis, and Theragretes.

== Venom ==
The few reported bites from Brazil resulted in no symptoms, indicating that they can deliver dry bites or small amounts of venom. However, they should be treated with caution due to some reports of bites causing local pain and muscle contractions. These spiders also have a low venom yield; Actinopus crassipes for example has a mean venom yield of 0.09 mg.

== Species ==
As of October 2026, this genus includes one hundred species:

- Actinopus anselmoi Miglio, Pérez-Miles & Bonaldo, 2020 – Brazil
- Actinopus apalai Miglio, Pérez-Miles & Bonaldo, 2020 – Brazil
- Actinopus apiacas Miglio, Pérez-Miles & Bonaldo, 2020 – Brazil
- Actinopus argenteus Ríos-Tamayo & Goloboff, 2018 – Argentina
- Actinopus ariasi Ríos-Tamayo & Goloboff, 2018 – Argentina
- Actinopus azaghal Miglio, Pérez-Miles & Bonaldo, 2020 – Brazil
- Actinopus balcarce Ríos-Tamayo & Goloboff, 2018 – Argentina
- Actinopus bocaina Miglio, Pérez-Miles & Bonaldo, 2020 – Brazil
- Actinopus buritiensis Miglio, Pérez-Miles & Bonaldo, 2020 – Brazil
- Actinopus candango Miglio, Pérez-Miles & Bonaldo, 2020 – Brazil
- Actinopus caraiba (Simon, 1889) – Venezuela
- Actinopus castelo Miglio, Pérez-Miles & Bonaldo, 2020 – Brazil
- Actinopus casuhati Ríos-Tamayo & Goloboff, 2018 – Argentina
- Actinopus caxiuana Miglio, Pérez-Miles & Bonaldo, 2020 – Brazil
- Actinopus chilikuti Ríos-Tamayo & Goloboff, 2025 – Argentina
- Actinopus clavero Ríos-Tamayo & Goloboff, 2018 – Argentina
- Actinopus coboi Ríos-Tamayo, 2019 – Uruguay
- Actinopus cochabamba Ríos-Tamayo, 2016 – Peru, Bolivia
- Actinopus concinnus Miglio, Pérez-Miles & Bonaldo, 2020 – Venezuela
- Actinopus confusus Miglio, Pérez-Miles & Bonaldo, 2020 – Brazil
- Actinopus cordobensis Ríos-Tamayo & Goloboff, 2018 – Argentina
- Actinopus cornelli Miglio, Pérez-Miles & Bonaldo, 2020 – Brazil
- Actinopus coylei Ríos-Tamayo & Goloboff, 2018 – Argentina
- Actinopus crassipes (Keyserling, 1891) – Brazil, Paraguay, Argentina
- Actinopus cucutaensis Mello-Leitão, 1941 – Colombia, Venezuela, Brazil
- Actinopus dioi Miglio, Pérez-Miles & Bonaldo, 2020 – Brazil
- Actinopus dubiomaculatus Mello-Leitão, 1923 – Brazil
- Actinopus ducke Miglio, Pérez-Miles & Bonaldo, 2020 – Brazil
- Actinopus echinus Mello-Leitão, 1949 – Brazil
- Actinopus emas Miglio, Pérez-Miles & Bonaldo, 2020 – Brazil
- Actinopus embera Osorio, Sherwood & Quĳano-Cuervo, 2025 – Colombia
- Actinopus excavatus Ríos-Tamayo & Goloboff, 2018 – Argentina
- Actinopus fernandezi Ríos-Tamayo, 2019 – Uruguay
- Actinopus fractus Mello-Leitão, 1920 – Brazil
- Actinopus gerschiapelliarum Ríos-Tamayo & Goloboff, 2018 – Uruguay, Argentina
- Actinopus goloboffi Ríos-Tamayo, 2014 – Argentina
- Actinopus guajara Miglio, Pérez-Miles & Bonaldo, 2020 – Brazil
- Actinopus harti Pocock, 1895 – Trinidad
- Actinopus harveyi Miglio, Pérez-Miles & Bonaldo, 2020 – Brazil
- Actinopus hirsutus Miglio, Pérez-Miles & Bonaldo, 2020 – Brazil
- Actinopus indiamuerta Ríos-Tamayo & Goloboff, 2018 – Argentina
- Actinopus insignis (Holmberg, 1881) – Uruguay, Argentina
- Actinopus ipioca Miglio, Pérez-Miles & Bonaldo, 2020 – Brazil
- Actinopus itacolomi Miglio, Pérez-Miles & Bonaldo, 2020 – Brazil
- Actinopus itapitocai Miglio, Pérez-Miles & Bonaldo, 2020 – Brazil
- Actinopus itaqui Miglio, Pérez-Miles & Bonaldo, 2020 – Brazil
- Actinopus jaboticatubas Miglio, Pérez-Miles & Bonaldo, 2020 – Brazil
- Actinopus jamari Miglio, Pérez-Miles & Bonaldo, 2020 – Brazil
- Actinopus laventana Miglio, Pérez-Miles & Bonaldo, 2020 – Uruguay, Argentina
- Actinopus lomalinda Miglio, Pérez-Miles & Bonaldo, 2020 – Colombia, Guyana
- Actinopus longipalpis C. L. Koch, 1842 – Paraguay, Uruguay, Argentina
- Actinopus lucasae Sherwood & Ríos-Tamayo, 2023 – Bolivia
- Actinopus magnus Ríos-Tamayo & Goloboff, 2018 – Argentina
- Actinopus mairinquensis Miglio, Pérez-Miles & Bonaldo, 2020 – Brazil
- Actinopus mesa Miglio, Pérez-Miles & Bonaldo, 2020 – Brazil
- Actinopus nattereri (Doleschall, 1871) – Brazil
- Actinopus nigripes (Lucas, 1834) – Brazil
- Actinopus obidos Miglio, Pérez-Miles & Bonaldo, 2020 – Brazil
- Actinopus obrerografico Nicoletta, Soresi & Ferretti, 2025 – Argentina
- Actinopus osbournei Miglio, Pérez-Miles & Bonaldo, 2020 – Brazil
- Actinopus palmar Ríos-Tamayo & Goloboff, 2018 – Argentina
- Actinopus pampa Ríos-Tamayo & Goloboff, 2018 – Argentina
- Actinopus pampulha Miglio, Pérez-Miles & Bonaldo, 2020 – Brazil
- Actinopus panguana Miglio, Pérez-Miles & Bonaldo, 2020 – Peru
- Actinopus parafundulus Miglio, Pérez-Miles & Bonaldo, 2020 – Brazil
- Actinopus paraitinga Miglio, Pérez-Miles & Bonaldo, 2020 – Brazil
- Actinopus paranensis Mello-Leitão, 1920 – Brazil
- Actinopus patagonia Ríos-Tamayo & Goloboff, 2018 – Argentina
- Actinopus piceus (Ausserer, 1871) – Brazil
- Actinopus pinhao Miglio, Pérez-Miles & Bonaldo, 2020 – Brazil
- Actinopus princeps Chamberlin, 1917 – Brazil
- Actinopus puelche Ríos-Tamayo & Goloboff, 2018 – Uruguay, Argentina
- Actinopus pusillus Mello-Leitão, 1920 – Brazil
- Actinopus ramirezi Ríos-Tamayo & Goloboff, 2018 – Argentina
- Actinopus reycali Ríos-Tamayo & Goloboff, 2018 – Argentina
- Actinopus reznori Miglio, Pérez-Miles & Bonaldo, 2020 – Brazil
- Actinopus robustus (O. Pickard-Cambridge, 1892) – Panama
- Actinopus rojasi (Simon, 1889) – Venezuela
- Actinopus rufibarbis Mello-Leitão, 1930 – Brazil
- Actinopus rufipes (Lucas, 1834) – Brazil
- Actinopus saraguro Dupérré & Tapia, 2025 – Ecuador
- Actinopus scalops (Simon, 1889) – Venezuela
- Actinopus septemtrionalis Ríos-Tamayo & Goloboff, 2018 – Argentina
- Actinopus simoi Ríos-Tamayo, 2019 – Uruguay
- Actinopus szumikae Ríos-Tamayo & Goloboff, 2018 – Argentina
- Actinopus taragui Ríos-Tamayo & Goloboff, 2018 – Argentina
- Actinopus tarsalis Perty, 1833 – Brazil (type species)
- Actinopus tasneemae Sherwood & Pett, 2022 – Paraguay
- Actinopus tatara Montenegro & Aguilera, 2023 – Chile
- Actinopus tetymapyta Sherwood & Pett, 2022 – Paraguay
- Actinopus trinotatus Mello-Leitão, 1938 – Brazil
- Actinopus tutu Miglio, Pérez-Miles & Bonaldo, 2020 – Brazil
- Actinopus urucui Miglio, Pérez-Miles & Bonaldo, 2020 – Brazil
- Actinopus uruguayense Ríos-Tamayo, 2019 – Uruguay
- Actinopus utinga Miglio, Pérez-Miles & Bonaldo, 2020 – Brazil
- Actinopus valencianus (Simon, 1889) – Venezuela
- Actinopus vilhena Miglio, Pérez-Miles & Bonaldo, 2020 – Brazil
- Actinopus wallacei F. O. Pickard-Cambridge, 1896 – Brazil
- Actinopus xenus Chamberlin, 1917 – South America (details unknown)
- Actinopus xingu Miglio, Pérez-Miles & Bonaldo, 2020 – Brazil

Formerly included:

- A. bonneti (Zapfe, 1961) (Transferred to Plesiolena)
- A. gracilis (Hentz, 1842) (Transferred to Antrodiaetus)
