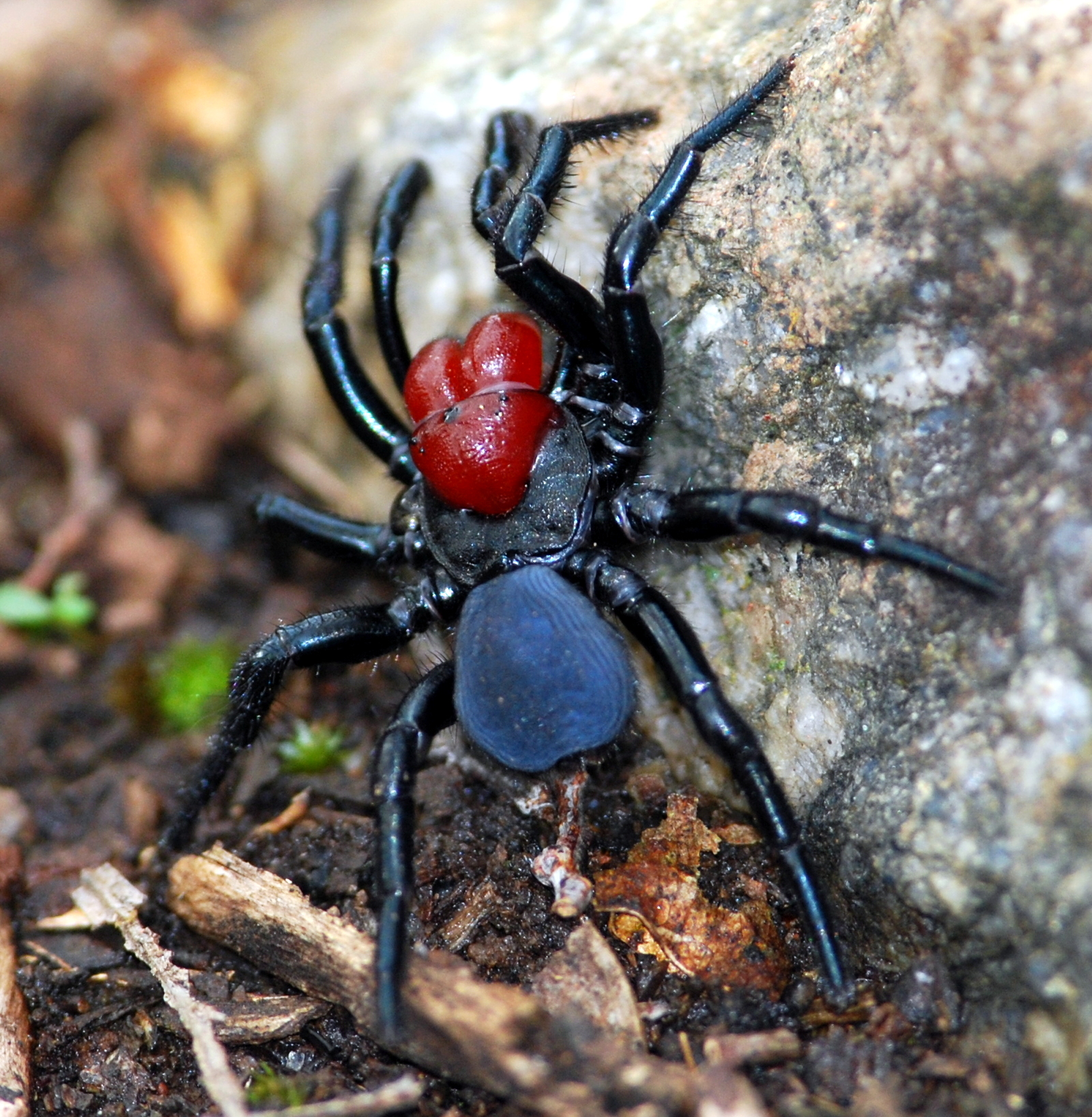
- Male
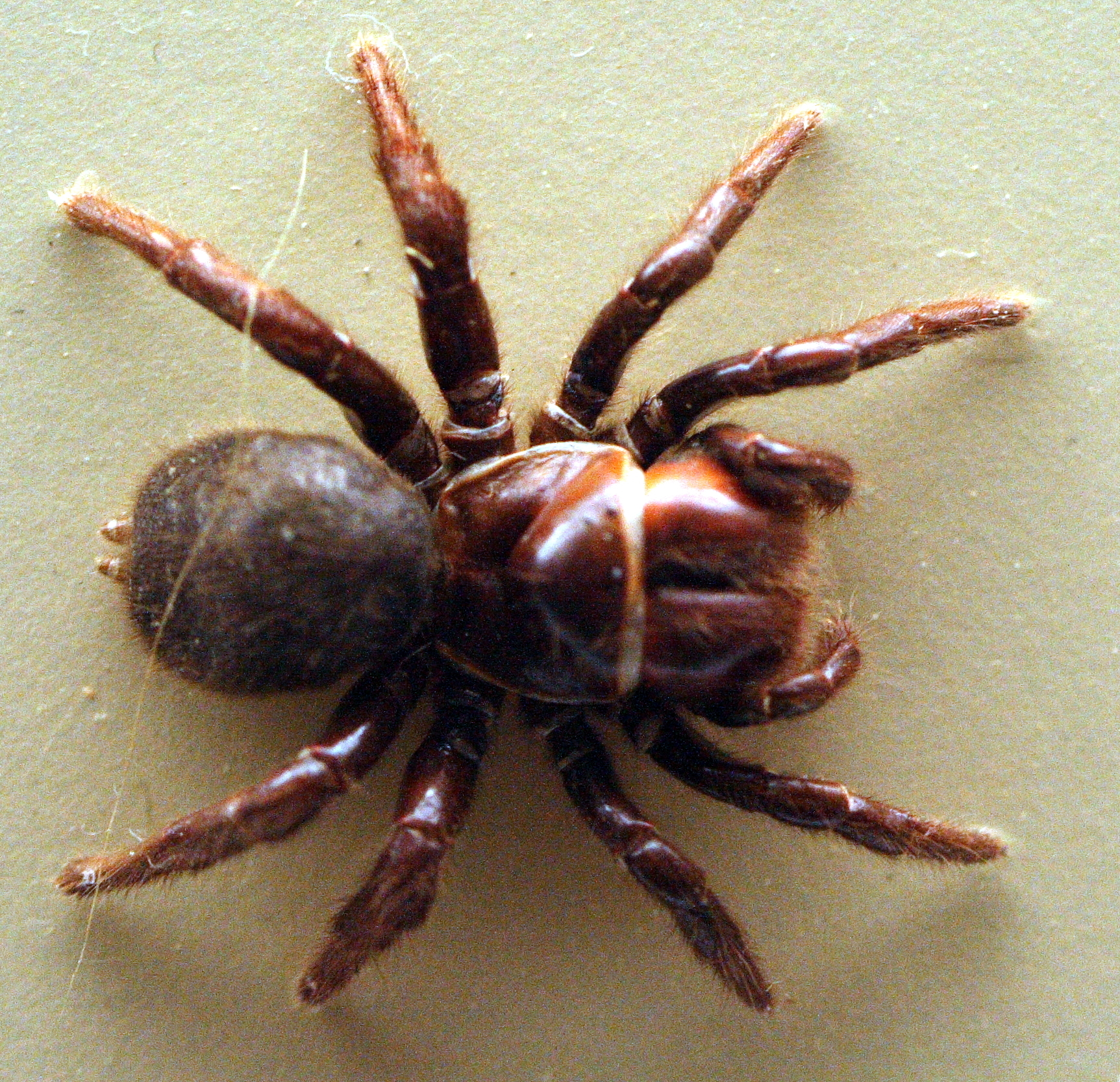
- Female

Scientific classification
- Kingdom: Animalia
- Phylum: Arthropoda
- Subphylum: Chelicerata
- Class: Arachnida
- Order: Araneae
- Infraorder: Mygalomorphae
- Family: Actinopodidae
- Genus: Missulena
- Species: M. occatoria

Binomial name
- Missulena occatoria Walckenaer, 1805
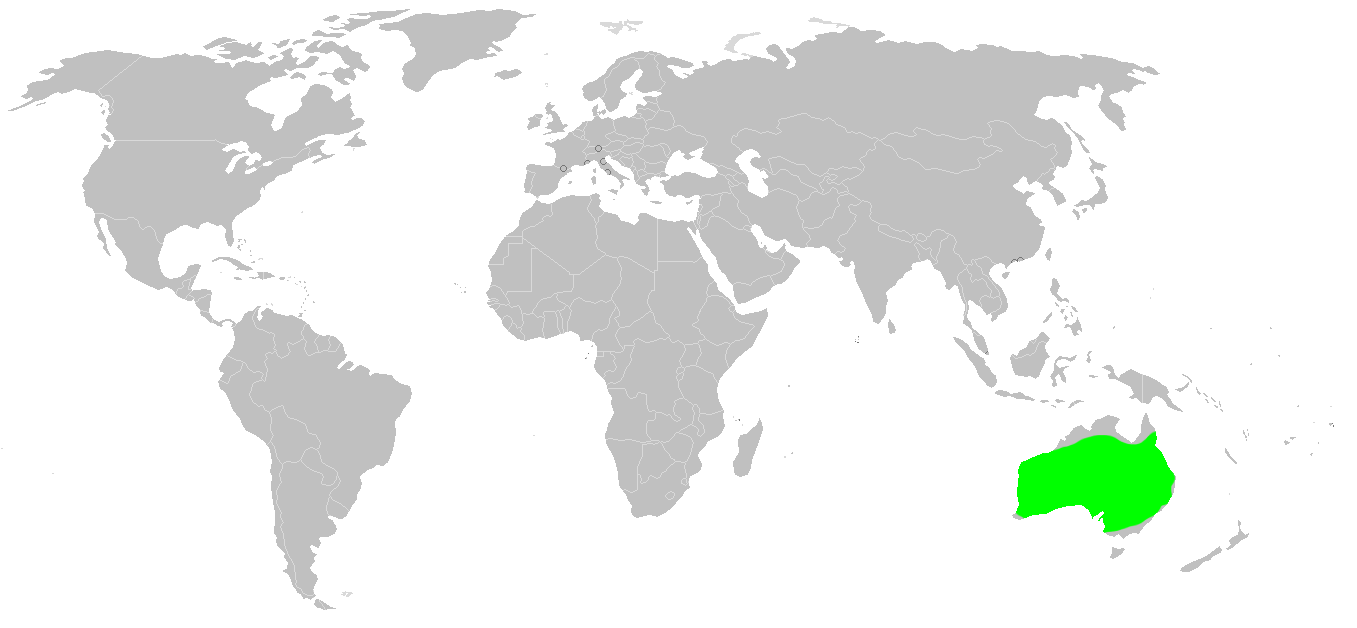

Synonyms
- Eriodon occatorium Lucas, 1865; Eriodon formidabile O. Pickard-Cambridge, 1869; Eriodon rubrocapitatum Keyserling, 1875; Eriodon rugosum Ausserer, 1875; Eriodon formidabilis Hogg, 1901; Eriodon rugosa Hogg, 1901; Eriodon rubrocapitata Hogg, 1901; Eriodon occatoria (Walckenaer, 1805); Missulena rubriceps Strand, 1907

= Missulena occatoria =

Red-headed mouse spider

Species of spider

Missulena occatoria, known as the red-headed mouse spider, is a species of spider found in Australia, from open forest to desert shrubland. It is the most widely distributed Missulena species, occurring throughout mainland Australia (but mainly west of the Great Dividing Range). This is possible because the spiderlings disperse via wind (ballooning). Normally this only occurs with araneomorph spiders, mygalomorph spiders normally disperse by walking. Missulena venom may be very toxic, but few cases of serious envenomation have been recorded. Most recorded bites only caused minor effects, with Australian funnel-web spider antivenom having proved effective as a treatment.

The spiders dig a burrow up to 55 cm deep, with two trapdoors.

Females are approximately 35 mm long, stout, short-legged, and mostly dark brown to black (but the jaws are sometimes red-tinged). The smaller males are approximately 15 mm long, have longer and thinner legs, and the head and jaws are bright red while the abdomen is gunmetal blue to black.

== Taxonomy ==
M. occatoria was first described by Charles Athanase Walckenaer in 1805. Some confusion exists between this species and M. insignis. For example, H. Womersley in 1943 regarded Actinopus formosus as a synonym of M. occatoria, whereas Barbara York Main in 1985 treated it as a synonym of M. insignis, the position adopted by the World Spider Catalog. She considered that Womersley had partly confused M. occatoria and M. insignis, with M. occatoria only occurring in eastern Australia. According to Framenau et al., the two cannot be differentiated based on the original description.
