= Itaqui (footballer, born 1973) =

Brazilian footballer

Personal information
- Full name: Jesus Cleiton Pereira da Silva
- Date of birth: 20 January 1973 (age 53)
- Place of birth: Itaqui, Brazil
- Position: Right back

Youth career
- 1990–1992: Juventude

Senior career*
Years	Team	Apps	(Gls)
1992–1997	Juventude		
1998–2001	Grêmio	189	(15)
2002	Juventude		
2003–2005	Vila Nova		
2006	Novo Hamburgo		
2006	Ulbra		
2007	Glória		
2009	Ypiranga-RS		
2010–2011	Garibaldi		

Managerial career
- 2016: Marau
- 2017–2019: Juventude (U17)
- 2019–2020: Caçador
- 2022–: Grêmio (U17)
- * Club domestic league appearances and goals as of 16 May 2024

Jesus Cleiton Pereira da Silva (born 20 January 1973), better known as Itaqui, is a Brazilian former professional footballer and manager, who played as a right back.

== Career ==
Revealed by the youth sectors of Juventude, he was champion of Série B in 1994, the first title of the Parmalat era. In 1997 he was hired by Grêmio to replace Francisco Arce, and also played improvised as a midfielder, standing out even against the young Ronaldinho. He also had a successful spell at Vila Nova, where he won the state championship in 2005, and ended his career at Garibaldi in 2011.

== Managerial career ==
Itaqui became a professional coach and managed the Marau and Caçador teams, in the smaller divisions. He also manages Juventude's under-17 teams, and currently leads Grêmio in this category.

== Personal life ==
Jesus is brother of the also footballer Odacir, and uncle of Gerethes. The three players adopted the nickname Itaqui.

== Honours ==
=== Player ===
Juventude

- Campeonato Brasileiro Série B: 1994

Grêmio

- Copa do Brasil: 2001
- Campeonato Gaúcho: 1999, 2001
- Copa Sul: 1999

Vila Nova

- Campeonato Goiano: 2005

=== Manager ===
Caçador

- Campeonato Catarinense Série C: 2019

Grêmio

- Campeonato Gaúcho Sub-17: 2023
