= Buriti, Maranhão =

Coordinates: 3°56′31″S 42°55′30″W

Buriti
- Municipality
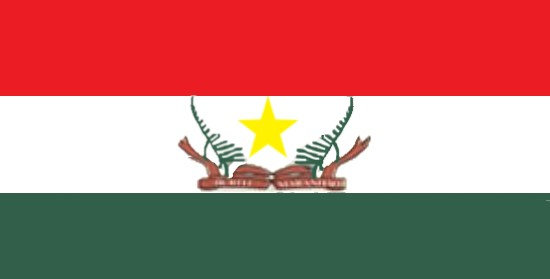
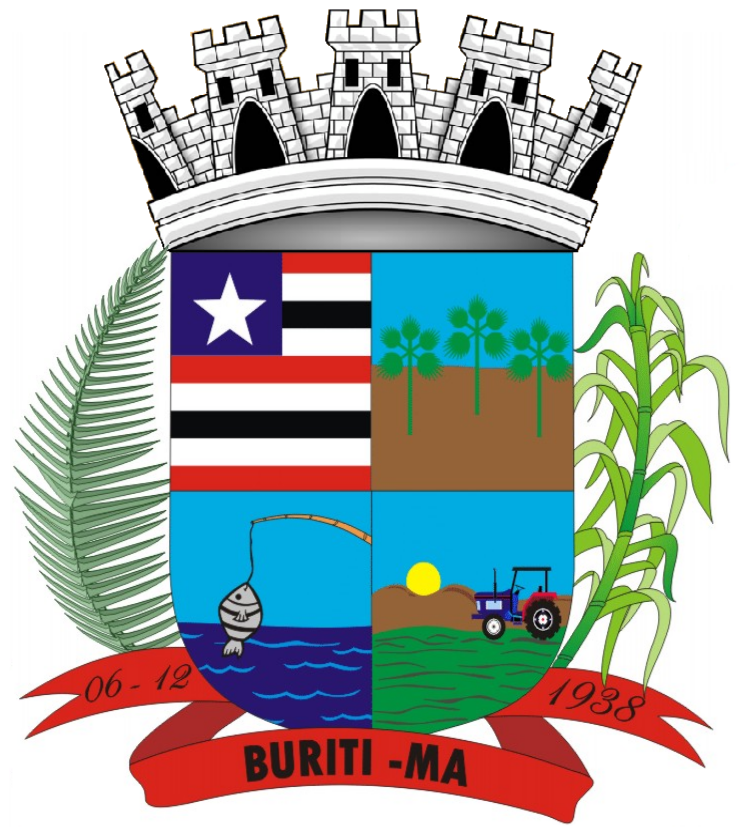
- Flag Coat of arms
- Interactive map of Buriti
- Country: Brazil
- Region: Nordeste
- State: Maranhão
- Mesoregion: Leste Maranhense

Population (2020)
  - Total: 28,798
- Time zone: UTC−3 (BRT)

Buriti is a municipality in the state of Maranhão in the Northeast region of Brazil.

== See also ==
- List of municipalities in Maranhão
