= Abacetus excavatus =

Scientific classification
- Kingdom: Animalia
- Phylum: Arthropoda
- Class: Insecta
- Order: Coleoptera
- Suborder: Adephaga
- Family: Carabidae
- Genus: Abacetus
- Species: A. excavatus

Binomial name
- Abacetus excavatus Straneo, 1949

Species of beetle

Abacetus excavatus is a species of ground beetle in the subfamily Pterostichinae. It was described by Straneo in 1949.
