= Itaqui (footballer, born 1990) =

Brazilian footballer

Personal information
- Full name: Gerethes Cleucir Souza da Silva
- Date of birth: August 15, 1990 (age 36)
- Place of birth: Itaqui, Brazil
- Height: 1.79 m (5 ft 10 in)
- Position: Right back

Team information
- Current team: Luverdense

Youth career
- 2008: Criciúma

Senior career*
Years	Team	Apps	(Gls)
2009	14 de Julho		
2010–2011	Caxias		
2011	Botafogo–SP		
2012	3 de Febrero		
2013	União Frederiquense		
2013	15 de Novembro		
2014	Glória		
2015–2016	Pelotas		
2016	Barra-SC		
2017	Avenida		
2017	Guarany		
2018	Avenida		
2018–	Luverdense		
- * Club domestic league appearances and goals

Gerethes Cleucir Souza da Silva (born 15 August 1990), known by his nickname Itaqui, is a Brazilian football player currently playing for Luverdense as right back.

== Personal life ==
Gerethes came from a family who has tradition in playing football. He has two uncles who played football, Jesus Cleiton Pereira da Silva and Odacir Pereira da Silva, and all of them are nicknamed Itaqui.
