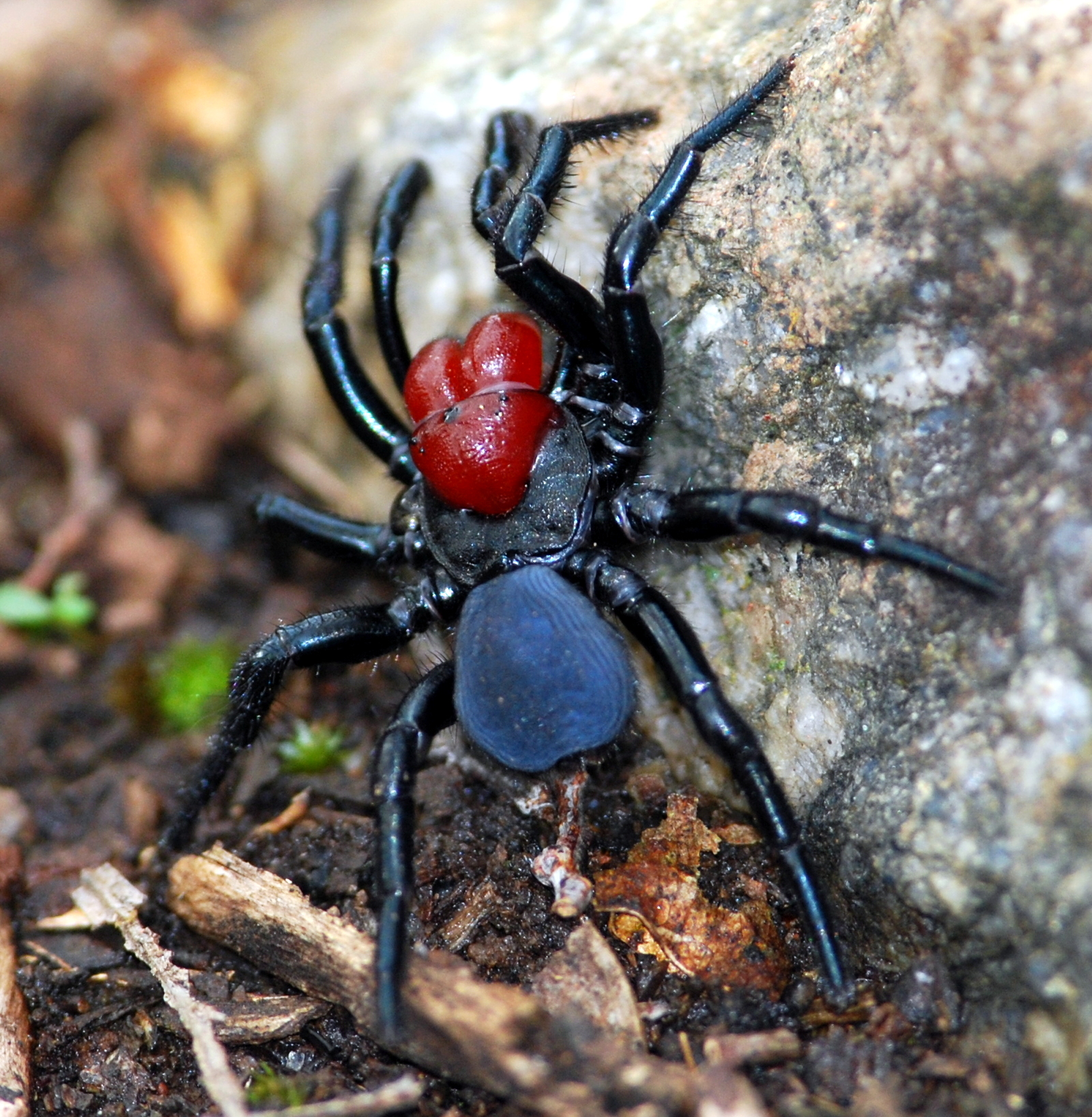
- Male Missulena occatoria

Scientific classification
- Kingdom: Animalia
- Phylum: Arthropoda
- Subphylum: Chelicerata
- Class: Arachnida
- Order: Araneae
- Infraorder: Mygalomorphae
- Family: Actinopodidae
- Genus: Missulena; Walckenaer, 1805

Type species
- M. occatoria Walckenaer, 1805

Species
- 26, see text

Synonyms
- Eriodon Latreille, 1806

= Missulena =

Genus of spiders

Missulena is a genus of mygalomorph spiders in the family Actinopodidae. It was first described by Charles Walckenaer in 1805, and is a senior synonym of Eriodon. M. tussulena is found in Chile, but the rest are indigenous to Australia. They are sometimes referred to as "mouse spiders" from the now-disproven belief that they dig deep burrows similar to those of mice. Scotophaeus blackwalli is also called a "mouse spider", but it is smaller and not closely related.

== Description ==
These spiders are medium to large in size, ranging from 1 to 3 centimetres (0.39 to 1.18 in). They have a glossy carapace and high, broad heads with eyes spread out across the front of the head, and short spinnerets in the rear of the abdomen. They also exhibit sexual dimorphism. Females are entirely black, while male colouration is specific to each species. For instance, male eastern mouse spiders (M. bradleyi) have a bluish patch, while male red-headed mouse spiders (M. occatoria) are brownish or blue-black with bright red-tinged jaws.

=== Identification ===
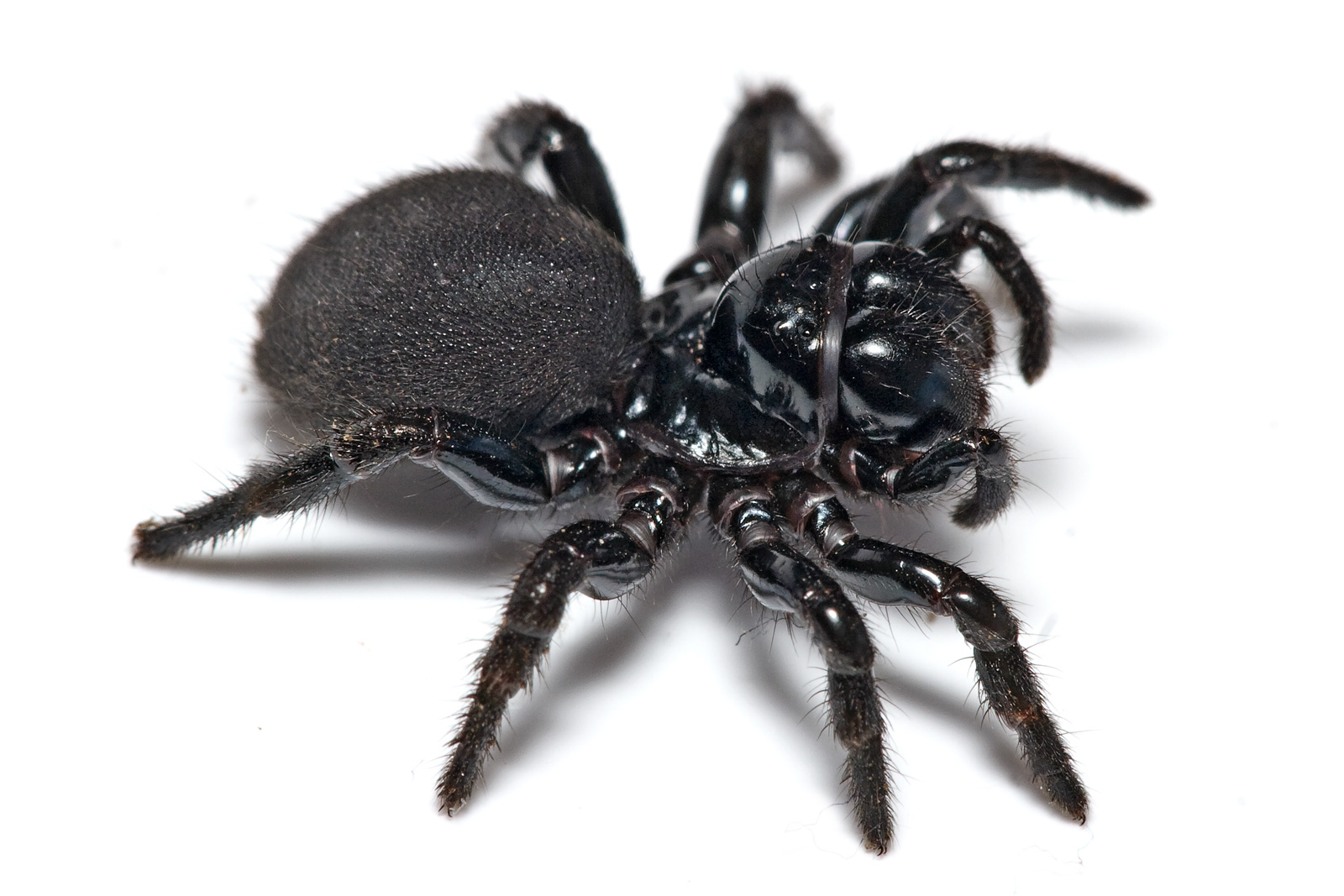
Missulena bradleyi

Though they resemble most genera of the infraorder Mygalomorphae, they can be easily distinguished by the large pair of chelicerae, as well as by the placement of two small eyes in the centre of the head and three at each side, whereas in all other trapdoor spiders the eyes are grouped in a mound at the centre of the head.

Females are harder to identify than males, as they are entirely black, while males exhibit brighter colouration, usually in the form of a blueish abdomen or reddish carapace and chelicerae, or both.

== Distribution and habitat ==
These spiders have a Gondwanan distribution, with one species found in Chile and the rest distributed throughout Australia.

== Behaviour ==
These spiders live in trapdoor-covered burrows that can extend to nearly 30 centimetres (12 in) in depth. Females generally remain in their burrows, depending on the males to wander in search of mates. They mainly prey on insects, though they may consume other small animals as opportunity presents. Their primary predators include wasps, centipedes and scorpions.

== Medical significance ==
Bites from these spiders are painful, but not generally dangerous. Serious envenomation is relatively rare, but bites documented in medical literature did not require antivenom treatment or involve serious symptoms. There is evidence that a mouse spider bite can potentially be as serious as that of an Australian funnel-web spider, but recorded bites are rare, despite the abundance of some species amid human habitation.

These spiders look very similar to the Australian funnel-web spiders and bites should be initially treated as funnel-web spider bites until the spider is positively identified by an expert. Australian funnel-web spider antivenom has been found to be effective in treating severe mouse spider bites. Unlike the Australian funnel-web spiders, however, the mouse spider is far less aggressive towards humans, and may often bite without releasing any venom.

== Species ==
As of October 2026 it contains 26 species:

- M. bradleyi Rainbow, 1914 – Australia (NSW)
- M. davidi Greenberg, Huey, Framenau & Harms, 2021 – Australia (WA)
- M. dipsaca Faulder, 1995 – Australia
- M. durokoppin Marsh, Stevens & Framenau, 2023 – Australia (WA)
- M. faulderi Harms & Framenau, 2013 – Australia (WA)
- M. gelasinos Marsh, Stevens & Framenau, 2023 – Australia (WA)
- M. granulosa (O. Pickard-Cambridge, 1869) – Australia (WA)
- M. harewoodi Framenau & Harms, 2017 – Australia (WA)
- M. hoggi Womersley, 1943 – Australia (WA)
- M. ignea Marsh, Stevens & Framenau, 2023 – Australia (WA)
- M. insignis (O. Pickard-Cambridge, 1877) – Australia
- M. iugum Greenberg, Huey, Framenau & Harms, 2021 – Australia (WA)
- M. langlandsi Harms & Framenau, 2013 – Australia (WA)
- M. leniae Miglio, Harms, Framenau & Harvey, 2014 – Australia (WA)
- M. mainae Miglio, Harms, Framenau & Harvey, 2014 – Australia (WA)
- M. manningensis Greenberg, Huey, Framenau & Harms, 2021 – Australia (WA)
- M. melissae Miglio, Harms, Framenau & Harvey, 2014 – Australia (WA)
- M. minima Marsh, Stevens & Framenau, 2023 – Australia (WA)
- M. occatoria Walckenaer, 1805 – Australia
- M. pinguipes Miglio, Harms, Framenau & Harvey, 2014 – Australia (WA)
- M. pruinosa Levitt-Gregg, 1966 – Australia (WA, NT)
- M. reflexa Rainbow & Pulleine, 1918 – Australia (SA)
- M. rutraspina Faulder, 1995 – Australia (WA, SA, VIC)
- M. terra Marsh, Stevens & Framenau, 2023 – Australia (WA)
- M. torbayensis Main, 1996 – Australia (WA)
- M. tussulena Goloboff, 1994 – Chile

Formerly included:

- M. bonneti (Zapfe, 1961) (Transferred to Plesiolena)
