= Plesiolena =

Scientific classification
- Kingdom: Animalia
- Phylum: Arthropoda
- Subphylum: Chelicerata
- Class: Arachnida
- Order: Araneae
- Infraorder: Mygalomorphae
- Family: Actinopodidae
- Genus: Plesiolena; Goloboff & Platnick, 1987

Type species
- P. bonneti (Zapfe, 1961)

Species
- Plesiolena bonneti (Zapfe, 1961); Plesiolena jorgelina Goloboff, 1994

Genus of spiders

Plesiolena is a small genus of South American mygalomorph spiders in the family Actinopodidae. It was first described by Pablo A. Goloboff and Norman I. Platnick in 1987, and it has only been found in Chile. The name is a combination of "plesiomorphy" and the genus Missulena. As of October 2026 it contains only 2 species: P. bonneti and P. jorgelina.
