= Itaqui (footballer, born 1988) =

Brazilian footballer

Personal information
- Full name: Odacir Pereira da Silva
- Date of birth: 28 February 1988 (age 38)
- Place of birth: Itaqui, Brazil
- Height: 1.76 m (5 ft 9 in)
- Positions: Midfielder; left-back

Youth career
- 2001–2006: Grêmio

Senior career*
Years	Team	Apps	(Gls)
2007–2010	Grêmio	8	(0)
2008	→ Paulista (loan)	0	(0)
2008	→ Náutico (loan)	12	(0)
2009	→ Guarani (loan)	4	(0)
2010–2012	Caxias	14	(1)
2011	→ Paraná (loan)	13	(2)
2012	→ Criciúma (loan)	0	(0)
2013	União Barbarense		
2013–2016	Juventude		
2016 –	Boa Esporte		
- Luverdense
- * Club domestic league appearances and goals

Odacir Pereira da Silva (born 28 February 1988), known as Itaqui, is a Brazilian former professional footballer who played as a midfielder or left-back.

== Personal life ==
Itaqui was born in Itaqui. His nephew, Gerethes Cleucir Souza da Silva, is also a professional footballer who goes by the same nickname.

== Honours ==
- Rio Grande do Sul State League: 2007
