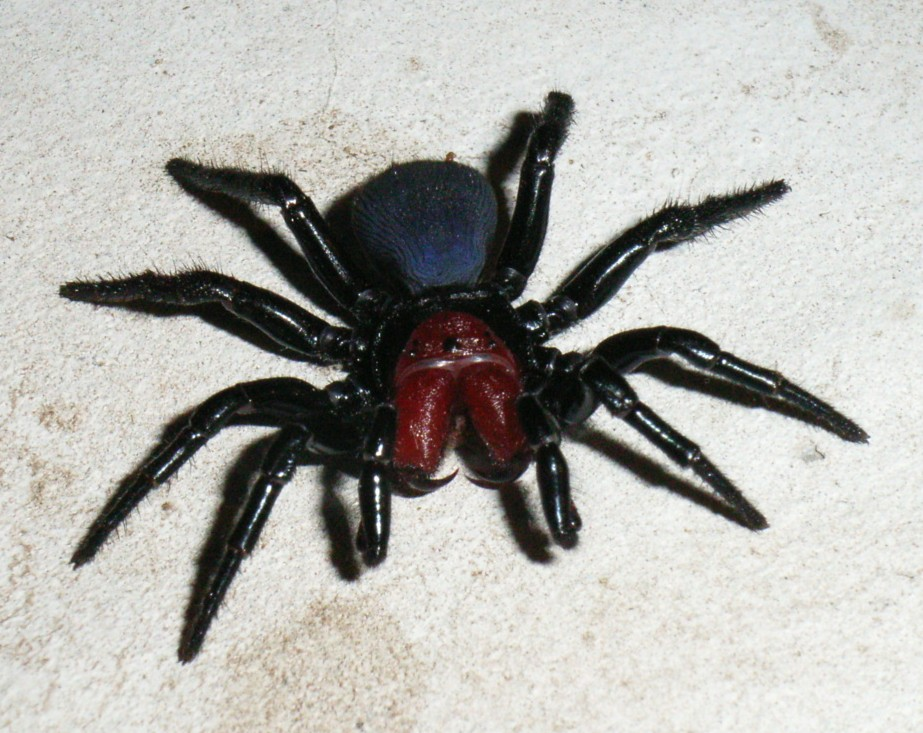
- M. occatoria, male

Scientific classification
- Kingdom: Animalia
- Phylum: Arthropoda
- Subphylum: Chelicerata
- Class: Arachnida
- Order: Araneae
- Infraorder: Mygalomorphae
- Clade: Avicularioidea
- Family: Actinopodidae; Simon, 1892

Genera
- 3, see text

Diversity
- 3 genera, 128 species
- blue: reported countries (WSC) green: observation hotspots (iNaturalist)

= Actinopodidae =

Family of spiders

Actinopodidae is a family of mygalomorph spiders found in mainland Australia and South America usually in open forest. Species are most common in Queensland, Australia. It includes mouse spiders (Missulena species), whose bites, though rare, are considered medically significant and potentially dangerous.

== Description ==
Actinopodidae has wider vision than most other Australian mygalomorphs and have a wide front to their carapace. Members of the family are stout black with species size varying from 10 mm to 35 mm in length. Species have distinctively bulbous heads and jaw regions. They are oftentimes confused with funnel-web spiders. Depending on the species, the abdomen is black or dark blue with a light grey to white patch top. Legs are dark and may appear thin and the head is shiny black. Female of the family are stockier and larger.

== Burrow ==
They live in soil covered burrows with a hinged top. Burrows can extend to a depth of 30 cm (12 inches). The purpose of the burrow is for refuge from predators, temperature control and parasites. Male spiders will wander away from the burrow in search for female spiders for mating while females stay in the burrow for most of their life.

== Diet ==
Species of Actinopodidae are ambush hunters that lie in their burrow lid at night preying on insects that are within catching range.

== Genera ==
As of October 2026, the World Spider Catalog accepted three genera in this family:

- Actinopus Perty, 1833 – South America
- Missulena Walckenaer, 1805 – Australia, Chile
- Plesiolena Goloboff & Platnick, 1987 – Chile
