= List of organisms named after famous people (born 1975–present) =

In biological nomenclature, organisms often receive scientific names that honor a person. A taxon (e.g., species or genus; plural: taxa) named in honor of another entity is an eponymous taxon, and names specifically honoring a person or persons are known as patronyms. Scientific names are generally formally published in peer-reviewed journal articles or larger monographs along with descriptions of the named taxa and ways to distinguish them from other taxa. Following the ICZN's International Code of Zoological Nomenclature, based on Latin grammar, species or subspecies names derived from a man's name often end in -i or -ii if named for an individual, and -orum if named for a group of men or mixed-sex group, such as a family. Similarly, those named for a woman often end in -ae, or -arum for two or more women.

This list is part of the list of organisms named after famous people, and includes organisms named after famous individuals born on or after 1 January 1975. It also includes ensembles (e.g. bands) in which at least one member was born after that date; but excludes companies, institutions, ethnic groups or nationalities, and populated places. It does not include organisms named for fictional entities, for biologists, paleontologists or other natural scientists, (Note: Arachnologist Norman I. Platnick, for instance, has 58 eponymous taxa as of 2021.) nor for associates or family members of researchers who are not otherwise notable.

Organisms named after famous people born earlier can be found in:

- List of organisms named after famous people (born before 1800)
- List of organisms named after famous people (born 1800–1899)
- List of organisms named after famous people (born 1900–1924)
- List of organisms named after famous people (born 1925–1949)
- List of organisms named after famous people (born 1950–1974)

The scientific names are given as originally described (their basionyms): subsequent research may have placed species in different genera, or rendered them taxonomic synonyms of previously described taxa. Some of these names may be unavailable in the zoological sense or illegitimate in the botanical sense due to senior homonyms already having the same name.

== List (people born 1975–present) ==
Yellow background shading indicates that this taxon name has been subsequently modified (e.g. species transferred to a different genus), but the eponymy is still valid
Pink background shading indicates that this taxon name is invalid because of homonymy, or has been synonymised and is no longer in use, or is considered a nomen dubium

Taxon	Type	Namesake	Notes	Taxon image	Namesake image	Ref
Acanthogonatus messii Signorotto & Ferretti, 2023	Spider	Lionel Messi	A mygalomorph spider from Argentina, named "In honor of Lionel Andrés Messi, an Argentine professional footballer and one of the greatest players of all times, unique winner of seven [now eight] Ballons d'or."			
Aceria mosalahi Lewandowski & Elsayed, 2021	Mite	Mohamed Salah	A gall mite from Egypt "named after the Egyptian football player Mohamed Salah (Mo Salah) in recognition of his charity activities, effective promotion of anti-drug campaigns in Egypt, and inspiration of young Africans and Arabs."; Subsequently synonymised with Aceria dioscoridis.			
Adelius adeleae Shimbori & Shaw, 2019	Wasp	Adele	(Only the species name is in honor of Adele. Adelius is an old genus, established in 1833)			
Agra katewinsletae Erwin, 2002	Beetle	Kate Winslet	"Her (Titanic) character did not go down with the ship, but we will not be able to say the same for this elegant canopy species, if all the rain forest is converted to pastures."			
Agra liv Erwin, 2002	Beetle	Liv Tyler	"The existence of this species of elegant beetle is dependent upon the rainforest not undergoing an Armageddon".			
Ajkanesia harmincipsziloni † Szabó & Brazidec, 2022	Wasp	30Y	A fossil species found in Cretaceous ajkaite amber from Hungary, whose name "honours the alternative rock band 30Y. In Hungarian, the band's name is phonetically written as "harminc ipszilon". The band got its name after the Szombathely (western Hungary) bus service nr 30Y. Three members of the band, namely Zoltán Beck, László Beck and Zoltán Sárközy spent part of their childhood in the city of Ajka, from where the holotype specimen originates."			
Aldisa vozinhai Ortea & Freitas, 2026	Sea slug	Vozinha	"Dedicated to Vozinha, the 40-year-old goalkeeper for the Cape Verde national football team, originally from Mindelo, who saved everything in his World Cup debut against Spain, putting Cape Verde on the footballing map and being named man of the match. The red colour [the colour of the Spanish team] of the species dedicated to him is a tribute to his heroic feat." This species is actually native to the Caribbean Sea, but the lead author J. Ortea, who is Spanish, has a long-standing connection to Cape Verde, where he was awarded in 2023 the Medal of Environmental Merit by the Government of Cape Verde in recognition of his contributions to the study of the marine biodiversity of the archipelago. He has described many molluscan species from Cape Verdaean waters, such as Aldisa barlettai in the same genus, collected from the coast of São Vicente island, where Vozinha was born.			
Aleiodes gaga Butcher et al., 2012	Wasp	Lady Gaga				
Aleiodes shakirae Shimbori & Shaw, 2014	Wasp	Shakira	"Since parasitism by this species causes the host caterpillar to bend and twist its abdomen in various ways, and Shakira is also famous for her belly-dancing, the name seems particularly appropriate."			
Amata gil Witt et al., 2007	Moth	Gil Ofarim				
Aminiichthys † Ebert, 2026	Fish	Mahsa Amini	A fossil pycnodont fish genus from the Jurassic of England. "As a lasting memorial to of Jina Mahsa Amini, a 22-year-old Kurdish-Iranian woman who died on 16 September 2022 in a Teheran hospital due to physical violence she suffered while in morality police custody for an alleged violation of the Iranian Hijab law: Woman, Life, Freedom!"			
Amphilimna intersepultosetme † Thuy, Numberger-Thuy & Jagt, 2018	Brittle star	Between the Buried and Me	A fossil species from the Cretaceous of South Carolina. "Species name consisting of Latin "inter sepultos et me", translating into "between the buried and me", to honour the eponymous progressive metal band."			
Amphisbaena elbakyanae Torres-Ramírez, Angarita-Sierra & Vargas-Ramírez, 2021	Worm lizard	Alexandra Elbakyan	"We dedicate this species to the Kazakhstani scientist Alexandra Asanovna Elbakyan (Russian: Алекса́ндра Аса́новна Элбакя́н), creator of the web site Sci-Hub, for her colossal contributions for reducing the barriers in the way of science, as well as her reclamation that "everyone has the right to participate and share in scientific advancement and its benefits, freely and without economic constraints"."			
Anaulacomera mariellae Fianco, Faria & Cadena-Castañeda, 2021	Katydid	Marielle Franco	A species from Iguaçu National Park, Brazil, "named as a tribute to Marielle Francisco da Silva, known as Marielle Franco, a Brazilian human rights activist, feminist, and LGBTQIA+ advocate, a brave woman in opposition to the established brutality against minorities and people on the peripheries of the cities."			
Anolis nemonteae Ayala-Varela et al., 2021	Lizard	Nemonte Nenquimo	An anole from Ecuador, named "for Nemonte Nenquimo, indigenous activist who led a successful campaign and legal action that protected 500,000 acres of Amazonian rainforest and Waorani territory from oil extraction in Ecuador. [...] Here we honor Nemonte Nenquimo for her braveness and determination to protect natural forests and their inhabitants."			
Aptostichus angelinajolieae Bond, 2008	Spider	Angelina Jolie	Named in recognition of Jolie's work with the United Nations High Commission for Refugees.			
Arantia gretae Massa, 2020	Katydid	Greta Thunberg	"dedicated to Greta Thunberg, Swedish teenage environmental activist, who was able to carry away thousands and thousands of young, explaining them that time is running out to halt climate change caused by human activities. She, with naturalness, has stressed the problem of climate change to politicians of the world. The climate change may have very serious consequences mainly in the tropical areas."			
Aspergillus sigurros Visagie (2020)	Fungus	Sigur Rós	The paper on which this species was described was dedicated to retiring mycologist Keith A. Seifert, and this species was named after one of Seifert's favourite bands, Sigur Rós.			
Ausichicrinites zelenskyyi † Salamon et al., 2022	Feather star	Volodymyr Zelenskyy	A fossil species from the Jurassic of Ethiopia, described by Polish scientists during the 2022 Russian invasion of Ukraine and named "In honour of Volodymyr Oleksandrovych Zelenskyy, the sixth and current president of Ukraine for his courage and bravery in defending free Ukraine."			
Baicalellia daftpunka Stephenson, Van Steenkiste & Leander, 2018	Flatworm	Daft Punk	The flatworm has a helmet-shaped structure on the end of the penis, thus the species name refers to Daft Punk, an electronic music duo who wore helmets while performing publicly.			
Brachygobius jennie Tian et al., 2026	Fish	Jennie	"The specific epithet is in honor of Ms. Jennie Ruby Jane. The name recognizes her exceptional character and achievements, which proved source of inspiration for the first author who discovered the new species." The first author added "Listening to the songs of Jennie Ruby Jane during my studies was a constant source of inspiration. Naming this species after her is my way of acknowledging the positive influence she had on my work."			
Brachyplatystoma elbakyani † Agnolin & Bogan, 2020	Catfish	Alexandra Elbakyan	A fossil goliath catfish from the Miocene of Argentina, "dedicated to Alexandra Elbakyan, for her efforts in order to make available the scientific literature for researchers around the world."			
Bythaelurus stewarti Weigmann, Kaschner & Thiel, 2018	Shark	Rob Stewart	"The new species is named after the late filmmaker and shark conservationist Rob Stewart, who inspired the second author and stimulated her interest in sharks"			
Caenis gretathunbergae Malzacher, 2021	Mayfly	Greta Thunberg	"The species is dedicated to Greta Thunberg. Her activities for climate protection will also keep mayflies in good stead."			
Caerostris tinamaze Gregorič, 2015	Spider	Tina Maze	"named in honour of Tine Maze, Slovenian skier who won Crystal globe with 2414 points"			
Carcinonepa libererrantes † Haug, Haug, Hörnig, Braig & Haug, 2026	True bug	Stray Kids	A prehistoric true bug with forceps-like claws discovered in 100-million-year-old amber from a site in Kachin State, Myanmar. The species name libererrantes is a latinized name of the K-pop group Stray Kids. "The name seemed fitting because the posture of the fossil's chelae strongly resembles the group's trademark pose."			
Castianeira swiftay Pett, 2023	Spider	Taylor Swift	"The specific epithet is a noun in apposition, more specifically an anagram formed from the name of musician and global icon Taylor Swift, whose music has kept the first author energised and motivated through many late nights at the microscope."			
Celastrina iryna Pavulaan, 2025	Butterfly	Iryna Zarutska	A butterfly species native to the southern US named in honor of Iryna Zarutska, a Ukrainian refugee who was stabbed to death on a train in North Carolina.			
Cercopemyces messii Martínez et al., 2024	Fungus	Lionel Messi	A mushroom native to Argentina, named "as a tribute to the illustrious Lionel Andrés Messi Cuccittini, whose remarkable talent has brought immense joy and pride to the people of Argentina."			
Cherax snowden Lukhaup, Panteleit & Schrimpf, 2015	Crustacean	Edward Snowden	"The new species is named after the american freedom fighter Edward Joseph Snowden. He is honored due to of his extraordinary achievements in defense of justice, and freedom."			
Chibchea thunbergae Huber, 2020	Spider	Greta Thunberg	"This species is dedicated to Greta Thunberg for her courageous fight against human-induced climate change, defying the resistance of many, including some of the most powerful yet ignorant political leaders of the world."			
Chilomys carapazi Brito & Pardiñas, 2022	Rodent	Richard Carapaz	A forest mouse from northern Ecuador, "Named in honor of Richard Carapaz Montenegro, an Ecuadorian professional cyclist born in the Provincia de Carchi." (the type locality)			
Chilomys neisi Brito et al., 2022	Rodent	Neisi Dájomes	A forest mouse from southern Ecuador, "Named in honor of Neisi Dajomes Barrera, an Ecuadorian [...] weightlifting athlete born in the Provincia de Pastaza; Ecuadorian female Olympic gold medalist."			
Chromeornis funkyi † O'Connor et al., 2025	Bird	Chromeo	A fossil enantiornithean from the Cretaceous of China. "Funky Chromeo bird, in honor of the Chromeo Funklordz P-Thugg and Dave 1, who like many birds, make beautiful music." Chromeo said in response "We’ve been doing this for 20 years but this is the first time someone’s called us a dinosaur! Jokes aside, this is an incredible honor to add to a career full of surprises. We’re glad to bring a little fossil funk to the great science of paleontology."			
Cnopus twentyonepilotorum † Ferreira & Nel, 2026	Beetle	Twenty One Pilots	A fossil antlike leaf beetle found in Eocene Oise amber. "Beyond their musical impact, the dedication acknowledges the group's engagement with mental health awareness and their contribution to destigmatising discussions of anxiety, depression, and personal hardship."			
Commelina sugariae M.Pell.	Flowering plant	Rebecca Sugar	"The epithet honours Rebecca Rea Sugar, USA animator, director, screenwriter, producer, storyboard artist, voice actor, singer-songwriter, and creator of the Cartoon Network animated series Steven Universe. Sugar is the first non-binary person to create a series for Cartoon Network independently. Sugar identifies as bisexual, non-binary, and genderqueer, using she/they pronouns. Sugar's queerness has served as their inspiration for stressing the importance of LGBTQIA+ representation in art, especially in children’s entertainment, clearly visible in both Steven Universe and Adventure Time. The latter series had Sugar up to 2013 as a writer, storyboard artist, singer-songwriter, and voice actor."			
Craspedotropis gretathunbergae Schilthuizen et al., 2019	Snail	Greta Thunberg	The name was chosen in recognition of Thunberg's much-publicized climate activism, and because this species is particularly vulnerable to climate change.			
Crematogaster jacindae Sharaf & Hita Garcia, 2019	Ant	Jacinda Ardern	"in honor of Ms. Jacinda Ardern, the Prime Minister of New Zealand, in recognition of her humanitarian attitudes towards Muslim and minority communities in New Zealand."			
Cretapalpus vittari † Downen & Selden, 2021	Spider	Pabllo Vittar	A fossil species from the Crato Formation of Brazil.			
Ctenus monaghani Jäger, 2013	Spider	Dominic Monaghan	A wandering spider from Laos, "named in honour of the British actor Dominic Monaghan who filmed together with the author in Laos for the documentary show Wild Things; Dom's enthusiasm for nature in general, and spiders and other little respected animals in particular, was the driving force behind the production of this documentary." Subsequently transferred to genus Bowie (which is named after musician David Bowie, see List of organisms named after famous people (born 1925–1949)).			
Cystomastacoides nicolepeelerae Quicke, 2013	Wasp	Nicole D. Peeler	A favorite author of the lead biologist, who also named a species after fictional character Beatrix Kiddo			
Cystomastacoides yuvraji Ranjith, 2018	Wasp	Yuvraj Singh	A species native to India, dedicated "to 'Indian King of Sixes' Yuvraj Singh, Indian cricketer for cheering the hearts of billions with his huge sixes."			
Discheramocephalus malalae Darby, 2016	Beetle	Malala Yousafzai	"I have pleasure in naming this species after Malala Yousafzai (Malala = grief-stricken in the Pashto language), a co-recipient of the 2014 Nobel Peace Prize. Her leadership and activism for education is crucial to her generation's sound stewardship of the world's environment for peace and security."			
Discinisca messi † Pérez et al., 2023	Brachiopod	Lionel Messi	A fossil species from the Miocene of Argentina. The lead author said "The work was sent in its final version to the Ameghiniana journal on 20 December [of 2022], when all the Argentinian people were celebrating the arrival of the players in the country. There was no other option. It is a small way to dedicate something to one of the two most important players in the history of the Argentine national team and world football. And to thank him for the joy he gave us".			
Dokimocephalus oliveri † Westrop, Waskiewicz Poole & Adrain, 2010	Trilobite	John Oliver				
Dolabellopsocus rebecandradeae Lima, Silva-Neto & Rafael, 2025	Barklouse	Rebeca Andrade	This species is native to Brazil.			
Dolichogenidea carlosalvaradoi Fernandez-Triana & Boudreault, 2025	Wasp	Carlos Alvarado	A braconid wasp from Costa Rica, "Named in honor of Sr. Carlos Alvarado of San Jose, Costa Rica, in recognition of his bravery for being the President of Costa Rica for 2018–2022 and strongly supporting the non-damaging biodevelopment of its wild biodiversity."			
Dolichogenidea claudiadoblesae Fernandez-Triana & Boudreault, 2025	Wasp	Claudia Dobles Camargo	A braconid wasp from Costa Rica, "Named in honor of Sra. Claudia Dobles of San Jose, Costa Rica in recognition of her support for her family, husband and the non-damaging biodevelopment of Costa Rica during his term as President (2018–2022)."			
Duvalius djokovici Ćurčić, Pavićević & Vesović, 2022	Beetle	Novak Djokovic	A troglobiont carabid beetle found in an underground pit in Mount Povlen, Serbia, named after Djokovic "due to its speed, strength, flexibility, durability and ability to survive in a difficult environment." "He is the man who did much for this country. We feel urged to pay him back in the way we can", said researcher Nikola Vesović.			
Eulaema quadragintanovem Nemésio & Ferrari, 2012	Bee	Ronaldinho	'Quadraginta novem' means forty-nine, the number of Ronaldinho's T-shirt at Clube Atlético Mineiro (his team at the time this species was named). Ronaldinho chose the number 49 as a homage to his mother, born in 1949.			
Eutichurus luisdiazi Casas et al., 2025	Spider	Luis Díaz	"The specific name is after Luis Diaz, a young Colombian football player born at the type locality, municipality of Barrancas, and a pride for Colombia and specially his hometown for his professional career and the many social contribution through his foundation "Sembrando Esperanza" which focuses on improving the life quality of Barrancas and nearby populations."			
Figuladra robertirwini L. Stanisic, 2024	Snail	Robert Irwin	An Australian land snail "Named for Robert Irwin, conservationist and wildlife photographer, Australia Zoo."			
Filistata maguirei Marusik & Zamani, 2015	Spider	Tobey Maguire	Maguire starred in four Spider-Man films.			
Friesea gretae Greenslade & Fanciulli, 2020	Springtail	Greta Thunberg	"Named after Greta Tintin Eleonora Ernman Thunberg, young advocate for action on climate change."			
Friesodielsia lalisae Damth., Baka & Chaowasku	Flowering plant	Lisa (rapper)	This species is native to Thailand and "named in honour of Lalisa Manobal, a famous Thai rapper, singer and dancer, whose motivation has greatly inspired the first author to overcome any obstacles during her Ph.D. study."			
Gaga Pryer et al.	Fern	Lady Gaga	"named in honor of the American pop singer-songwriter-performer Lady Gaga, for her articulate and fervent defense of equality and individual expression in today's society. Because Lady Gaga speaks to the need for humanity to celebrate broad differences within its own species, we hereby provide her with a scientific namesake that characterizes the struggle to understand the intricate biology underlying cryptic patterns of diversity. Because public funding supports basic research, this naming honor allows us to acknowledge the confluence between science and public interests, and to make our findings more accessible and relevant to the diversity of individuals who fund our work. The name Gaga also echoes one of the molecular synapomorphies that characterizes the genus. At nucleotide positions 598–601 in the matK gene alignment, all Gaga species have "GAGA", a sequence pattern not seen at this site in any other cheilanthoid fern sampled". Concurrently with the genus, two species were described: Gaga germanotta, named for Lady Gaga's parents Cynthia and Joe Germanotta, and Gaga monstraparva, Latin for "little monster"			
Gagadon † Stucky & Covert, 2014	Even-toed ungulate	Lady Gaga	The type species is named Gagadon minimonstrum.			
Gibberula adzubae Ortea, 2015	Sea snail	Caddy Adzuba	One of 21 sea snails of the genus Gibberula concurrently named after female winners of the Prince of Asturias Awards (see also List of organisms named after famous people (born 1900–1924), List of organisms named after famous people (born 1925–1949) and List of organisms named after famous people (born 1950–1974)). (Note: Of the 21 women honoured, 2 are in this section of the list, 3 are in the List of organisms named after famous people (born 1900–1924), 9 are in the List of organisms named after famous people (born 1925–1949), 5 are in the List of organisms named after famous people (born 1950–1974), and the remaining two are not listed because they are natural scientists: Jane Goodall (Gibberula goodallae) and Linda R. Watkins (Gibberula watkinsae).) "Named in honour of Congolese lawyer Caddy Adzuba (Bukavu, 1981), laureate of the 2014 Prince of Asturias Award for Concord, an activist for women's rights, children's rights and freedom of the press in her country."			
Gibberula isinbayevae Ortea, 2015	Sea snail	Yelena Isinbayeva	One of 21 sea snails of the genus Gibberula concurrently named after female winners of the Prince of Asturias Awards. "Named in honour of athlete Yelena Isinbayeva [...], winner of the 2009 Prince of Asturias Award for Sports; specialist in the pole vault, she was the first woman to surpass the height of 5 m. Gold medallist at the Athens Olympic Games (2004), she broke the World record 18 times."			
Goniozus musae Ward, 2013	Wasp	Muse	A bethylid wasp from New Zealand. "This species is named after the music band, Muse. [The name] also refers to 'musings' over the placement of this species."			
Goodichthys prettii † Ebert, 2026	Fish	Renée Nicole Good	A fossil pycnodont fish genus from the Jurassic of Germany. "In memory of Renée Good, who was shot dead by an ICE officer on 7 January 2026, in Minneapolis, Minnesota. She had tried to stand by her neighbours against the ICE operation"			
Goodichthys prettii † Ebert, 2026	Fish	Alex Pretti	The type specias was named "In memory of Alex Jeffrey Pretti, who was murdered by Federal Immigration and Customs Enforcement (ICE) officers on 24 January 2026, in Minneapolis, Minnesota"			
Gormaniella Lewis, Robison & Fay-Wei Li	Green alga	Amanda Gorman	"It was a very dark time," said Li. "The COVID-19 pandemic had been going on for almost a year, and then there were the riots at the U.S. Capitol on January 6, 2021." After rounds of fruitless brainstorming, the lab group found inspiration during President Joe Biden's inauguration, when poet Amanda Gorman read her poem, "The Hill We Climb." "At a point when it was sometimes difficult to find meaning in our research, Amanda Gorman gifted us with this incredibly uplifting poem that gave us a renewed sense of hope in the lab"			
Granulina keilori Espinosa & Ortea, 2019	Sea snail	Keylor Navas	A species from the Caribbean coast of Costa Rica, "Named in honour of the outstanding Costa Rican sportsman Keilor Navas, captain of the Costa Rica national football team, a symbol for the youth of his country, "pura vida" (pure life) as some sports narrators nicknamed him, Trofeo Comunidad Iberoamericana 2018 at the [Spanish] Premios Nacionales del Deporte (National Sports Awards)."			
Gwesped piastrii † Jouault, Huang & Azevedo, 2026	Wasp	Oscar Piastri	A fossil flat wasp found in Cretaceous Burmese amber, whose name "honors Mr. Oscar Piastri for his achievements in Formula 1, and because the color of the amber piece recalled to the first author the iconic McLaren orange."			
Hemiandrus jacinda Trewick, 2021	Wētā	Jacinda Ardern				
Hoya indaysarae M.N.Medina, R.J.T.Villanueva, Kloppenb. & Cabras	Flowering plant	Sara Duterte	A waxvine native to Dinagat Islands, Philippines, named after then Davao City Mayor, Sara Duterte-Carpio (known as Inday Sara by the Davaoeños), daughter of then president Rodrigo Duterte, for her support for nature conservation initiatives in the region. "I am thankful that everyone knows that I like flowers and I am happy that there is a flower named after me," said Duterte.			
Hylomyrma macielae Ulysséa, 2021	Ant	Formiga	"named after Miraildes Maciel Mota, a black Brazilian woman and footballer, popularly known as "Formiga" (=ant in Portuguese). Formiga holds many international records; she is the only player present in all female football editions in the Olympic Games (the first edition happened in 1996), and has participated in seven different FIFA Women's World Cups."			
Hylomyrma marielleae Ulysséa, 2021	Ant	Marielle Franco	"named in honor of Marielle Franco (1979–2018), born Marielle Francisco da Silva, a black Brazilian woman, politician, feminist, and human rights activist, whose assassination, motivated by her positions and actions against all forms of discrimination, happened during her mandate as a representative in Rio de Janeiro local Assembly." The holotype was collected in Brazil.			
Hyloscirtus elbakyanae Varela-Jaramillo, Streicher, Venegas & Ron, 2025	Frog	Alexandra Elbakyan	"a patronym for Alexandra Elbakyan. She is a computer programmer and creator of Sci-Hub, a website which provides free access to scientific articles. Sci-Hub allows scientists worldwide to access articles that, otherwise, are behind paywalls and unaffordable in low- and middle-income countries. Our research has greatly benefited from access to relevant literature using Sci-Hub through the years."			
Ibexaspis coadyi † McAdams, Adrain & Karim, 2018	Trilobite	Sharon Needles	Named after Needles's birth name, Aaron Coady.			
Icius faker Yang & Zhang, 2024	Spider	Faker	"The specific epithet is a noun in apposition taken from "Faker", an alias used by Sang-hyeok Lee, who is a highly esteemed e-sports athlete in the game League of Legends. His striving spirit has inspired the first author during his study of jumping spiders."			
Idiogramma elbakyanae Khalaim, 2017	Wasp	Alexandra Elbakyan	"named in honour of [...][the] creator of the web-site Sci-Hub, in recognition of her contribution to making scientific knowledge available for all researchers." Because it is a parasitoid wasp, Elbakyan apparently felt offended by the naming, saying that "the real parasites are scientific publishers, and Sci-Hub, on the contrary, fights for equal access to scientific information." The author A. Khalaim responded that he supports Sci-Hub and the naming was not intended an insult.			
Iemanjavola monlafertei † Santelli, Del Río, De Araújo Távora & Feijó Ramos, 2024	Bivalve	Mon Laferte	A fossil scallop from the Miocene of Brazil.			
Impatiens nimspurjae Raskoti	Flowering plant	Nirmal Purja	A species of balsamine native to Gandaki Province, Nepal. "The specific epithet 'nimspurjae' honours Mr. Nirmal Purja (nickname Nimsdai) for his initiation on conservation through climate change champion. [sic]"			
Iniestapodus † Torcida Fernández-Baldor et al., 2021	Dinosaur	Andrés Iniesta	A fossil ichnogenus of sauropod dinosaurs described from tracks found on sedimentary rocks from the late Jurassic/early Cretaceous of Spain. The name, meaning "Iniesta's foot", is "dedicated to Andrés Iniesta, the Spanish footballer who scored the winning goal in the 2010 World Cup final." In a press release, the discoverers said "The tracks indicate, as in the case of the footballer from La Mancha, firm, elegant, graceful, well-marked steps of a dinosaur with a peaceful character, enduring in time, leaving a good trace [...] In the same way that the footsteps of the dinosaurs of Burgos have lasted millions of years, the talent and successes of Andrés Iniesta make up a fundamental part of the history of the Spanish national team and world football."			
Iolaus freyaallanae Sáfián, 2022	Butterfly	Freya Allan	"The species is named in honour of Miss Freya Allan, the British actress, who stars as Princess Cirilla Fiona Ellen Rianon – 'Ciri' in the internationally successful Netflix series The Witcher: also featured in the action comedy Gunpowder Milkshake and HBO Max's The Third Day. "			
Iphianassa zackieohae Panou & Gkelis, 2021	Bacterium	Zak Kostopoulos	A cyanobacterium isolated from a cave in Greece and named "in tribute to Zaharias (Zak) Kostopoulos (1985–2018) a Greek LGBTQI + and HIV activist, and drag queen, known also as Zackie Oh."			
Istiorachis macarthurae † Lockwood, Martill & Maidment, 2025	Dinosaur	Ellen MacArthur	An ornithopod dinosaur from the Cretaceous of the Isle of Wight, UK; "The species name honours Dame Ellen MacArthur, an English sailor who in 2005 set a world record for the fastest solo non-stop voyage around the world on her first attempt and who also founded the Ellen MacArthur Cancer Trust for young people on the Isle of Wight." MacArthur said it was "extraordinary and a huge honour", adding: "The fact that the Istiorachis 'sail' could be likened to the sails I have spent so much of my life below was very touching."			
Kaikaia gaga Morris & Dietrich, 2020	Treehopper	Lady Gaga	The lead author, a longtime fan of Lady Gaga, said "If there is going to be a Lady Gaga bug, it's going to be a treehopper, because they've got these crazy horns, they have this wacky fashion sense about them; they're unlike anything you've ever seen before." He also compared its horns to shoulder pads, and commented "It's just kind of their theme as a family of insects to have these very diverse and other-worldly forms that you wouldn't expect from an insect. Gaga often brings the unexpected and makes it popular."			
Lactifluus marielleae J.Duque & M.A.Neves (2020)	Fungus	Marielle Franco	A mushroom-forming species from Brazil named "in honour of the Brazilian politician, feminist, and human rights activist Marielle Franco killed on 14 March 2018."			
Lapidaster mastodon † Thuy, 2013	Brittle star	Mastodon	A fossil species from the Jurassic of Southern Germany, "named in honour of Brent Hinds, Brann Dailor, Bill Kelliher and Troy Sanders of the rockgroup Mastodon, whose music was indispensable during lengthy nightly sessions at the scanning electron microscope."			
Lepanthes dianatrujilloana J.S. Moreno, Gal.-Tar., Sierra-Ariza, & Zuluaga	Orchid	Diana Trujillo	This species is native to Colombia and its name "honors Diana Trujillo Pomerantz, a distinguished Colombian aerospace engineer, who has notably contributed to numerous NASA missions. She garnered significant recognition for her pivotal role in the Mars Curiosity Rover mission, where she initially served as a flight engineer before later taking a leadership position overseeing a team of engineers. Furthermore, Ms. Trujillo played a critical role in the Mars 2020 mission, specifically with the Perseverance rover [...] Notably, she facilitated NASA's inaugural Spanish-language broadcast for a Martian landing, a strategic endeavor aimed at fostering broader engagement within the Spanish-speaking scientific community and promoting inclusivity in space exploration. Finally, she stands as a beacon of inspiration, particularly for young women aspiring to forge careers in the STEM fields (Science, Technology, Engineering, and Mathematics)."			
Lepanthes nidiagongorana Gal.-Tar., J.S. Moreno, Zuluaga, & Sierra-Ariza	Orchid	Nidia Góngora	This species is native to Valle del Cauca, Colombia and "is named in honor of Nidia Góngora, an influential singer-songwriter and founder of the musical band Canalón de Timbiquí, lead voice of Ondatropica, Pacifican Power, and co-founder of the musical project Quantic and Nidia Góngora from Colombia. Hailing from Santa Bárbara de Timbiquí, in the Cauca region, Nidia has devoted her life to promoting and preserving the traditional music of the Colombian Pacific and the Afro-Colombian cultural heritage. As a pioneering female figure in a musical genre, Nidia serves as an inspiration for many, especially women aspiring to make a mark in various fields."			
Lepidobatrachus dibumartinez † Turazzini & Gómez, 2023	Frog	Emiliano Martínez	A fossil horned frog from the Late Miocene-Early Pliocene of Argentina, named to honour Argentine footballer Emiliano Martínez, who is also known as "Dibu Martínez", for playing a pivotal role as a goalkeeper in winning the 2022 FIFA World Cup with the Argentina national football team.			
Lillithaster lamentatiofelium † Thuy, Numberger-Thuy & Jagt, 2018	Brittle star	Katzenjammer	A fossil species from the Cretaceous of South Carolina, US. "Species name composed of Latin 'lamentatio' (= mourning) and 'felium' (= of cats), honouring the Norwegian folk rock band Katzenjammer, in recognition of their energy-loaded approach to music and their masterpiece "Demon Kitty Rag"."			
Liolaemus messii Ruiz et al., 2021	Lizard	Lionel Messi	A species of iguanian lizard native to a locality in Rosario de Lerma Department, Argentina, and named "in honour of Lionel Andrés Messi, a world-renowned Argentinian footballer, but above all a world-class example of humility and chivalry."			
Loancorhynchus catrillancai † Otero, 2019	Fish	Camilo Catrillanca	A fossil swordfish from the Eocene of Chile, named "Honoring the memory of the Mapuche leader Camilo Catrillanca." Otero argued his choice of name pointing out that in Chile there is a lack of memory with the natural and historical facts. "That is why it makes to me more sense than ever to name this species after Camilo Catrillanca. Just as our natural history has been ignored, I would not want the sad recent history of this case to be ignored. That is why I wanted to honor his memory by dedicating this species to him," he said. "It is in honor of him, and in part, to point out again how important it is to remember and know our own history," Otero added.			
Lobofemora scheirei Bressel & Constant, 2015	Stick insect	Lieven Scheire	"We dedicate this new species to Lieven both in recognition of his efforts in raising public awareness of science (including taxonomy), especially for young people, in his TV shows, and as a present for his recent wedding."			
Macrobiotus rybaki Stec & Vecchi, 2021	Tardigrade	Alexander Rybak	"The choice to dedicate the new species to Alexander Rybak is the fruit of our passion for the Eurovision Song Contest. We are both fans of this very popular, diverse and cheerful song contest, and we wanted to honour it with a reference to one of its most iconic winners."			
Macrobrachium irwini Kunjulakshmi, Santos & Prakash, 2022	Crustacean	Steve Irwin and his family	"honoured in the name of Stephen Robert Irwin (also Steve Irwin), nicknamed 'The Crocodile Hunter'. The 'irwini' has also been dedicated to his entire family members Terri Irwin (Wife), Robert Irwin (Son), Bindi Irwin (Daughter), Candler Powell [sic] (Son in law) and Gracy Warrior [sic] (Grand Daughter) for being an inspiration for nature enthusiasts through multitasking role as zookeeper, conservationist, television personality and wildlife photographer. Overall, we would like to dedicate the new species to Irwin's family efforts in continuing Steve Irwin's mission of "Conservation Through Exciting Education" in Australia Zoo, Queensland."			
Maeota ibargueni Galvis, 2014	Spider	Caterine Ibargüen	A species of jumping spider native to Colombia, named "in honour of Caterine Ibargüen Mena, world and Olympic triple jump champion, for her charisma and contribution to Colombian sport, and for sharing the talent of jumping with this particular and diverse group of spiders."			
Maguimithrax Klompmaker et al., 2015	Crustacean	Tobey Maguire	A genus of spider crab. Maguire starred in four Spider-Man films.			
Marginellopsis rineri Ortea, 2020	Sea snail	Teddy Riner	A small Neogastropod from the island of Guadeloupe, "dedicated to Teddy Riner (Pointe-á-Pitre, Guadeloupe, 1989), the judo legend, 10 times world super-heavyweight champion, with 154 consecutive victories in 10 years, a sportsman admired by the Guadeloupeans, as we could see in our talks with the park rangers and local collaborators of the Karubenthos expedition, looking for names for new species."			
Mecodema jacinda Seldon & Buckley, 2019	Beetle	Jacinda Ardern	The genus Mecodema is endemic to New Zealand, and this species is native to Maungatautari, close to Ardern's hometown of Hamilton.			
Megalestes gyalsey Gyeltshen, Kalkman & Orr, 2017	Damselfly	Jigme Namgyel Wangchuck	A species native to Bhutan, "named in honour of His Royal Highness Crown Prince of Bhutan, The Gyalsey, Jigme Namgyel Wangchuck, on the occasion of his first birthday."			
Meitingsunes Glowska & Skoracki 2010	Mite	Mei-Ting Sun	"This new genus is named in honor of Mei-Ting Sun, the greatest pianist living contemporary."			
Melusinaster alissawhitegluzae † Thuy & Stöhr, 2018	Brittle star	Alissa White-Gluz	A fossil species of basket star from the Jurassic of Germany, named "to honour Alissa White-Gluz, singer of death metal band Arch Enemy, for being an inspiring person, and to pay tribute to the intensity, authenticity and passion that she conveys in her powerful vocals." "It's a real honour", declared the singer. "The fact that such an important discovery was made while the palaeontologist was listening to our music is something quite special. Combining art and science in this way is impressive." She received a replica of the fossil from one of the authors while on stage at a concert in Rockhal, Luxembourg.			
Melusinaster arcusinimicus † Thuy & Stöhr, 2018	Brittle star	Arch Enemy	A fossil species of basket star from the Jurassic of Luxembourg; its name is "the Latin translation of Arch Enemy, Swedish death metal band, for producing some of the heaviest melodic death metal songs ever, and in particular for having written masterpieces such as "We will rise" and "Reason to believe"".			
Meotipa luoqiae Lin & Li, 2021	Spider	Luo Qi	A comb-footed spider native to China, "honoring the Chinese rock singer Mrs. Qi Luo, which encouraged the author by her courage, freedom and spirit of exploration"			
Meranoplus mosalahi Sharaf & Aldawood, 2019	Ant	Mohamed Salah				
Microcostatus elisabethianus Van de Vijver & Ector	Diatom	Princess Elisabeth, Duchess of Brabant	A freshwater diatom from the Crozet islands in the French Southern and Antarctic Lands, "named in honour of Her Royal Highness Princess Elisabeth of Belgium who already gave Her name to the Belgian research station on Antarctica." The lead author is Belgian.			
Mirpurina edytavaresi Ortea & Moro, 2023	Sea snail	Edy Tavares	This species from Cape Verde is "dedicated to Walter (Edy) Tavares (Maio, 22.3.1992), outstanding Cape Verdean basketball player, who has contributed in a decisive and incontestable manner to the classification of his country's team for the world championship of that sport. The white mantle that covers the animal's shell when it moves, a true meringue (Note: "Meringue" is a common nickname for Real Madrid players and supporters, referencing their white uniform.), is a tribute to Real Madrid, the Spanish team in which Tavares plays."			
Nama khalidae Meregalli & Borovec, 2023	Weevil	Khalida Popal	"Khalida Popal (born 1987) is an Afghan football player and director. She is the Program and Event Director of the Afghanistan Women's National Football Team. After the Taliban regained power in Afghanistan in August–September 2021, she helped coordinate the evacuation of young female Afghan football players and their families, 135 persons in total, who eventually landed in the UK on November 18th 2021."			
Nama yusrae Meregalli & Borovec, 2023	Weevil	Yusra Mardini	"Yusra Mardini (born 1998) is a former Syrian competition swimmer and refugee of the Syrian civil war. She also competed in the 2020 Summer Olympics in Tokyo, held in 2021, with the Refugee Olympic Team (EOR). In August 2015, while escaping by boat from the war, the motor stopped working and the dinghy began to take on water. Yusra and her sister Sarah jumped into the water and pushed and pulled the boat for over 3 h at night, saving all the people from drowning. She was named one of the 100 most influential people in the world by Time magazine in 2023, alongside her sister, Sarah."			
Nannaria mcelroyorum Hennen, Means & Marek, 2021	Millipede	Clint McElroy, Justin McElroy, Travis McElroy and Griffin McElroy	"This species is named for Clint, Justin, Travis, and Griffin McElroy from Huntington, West Virginia, who provided endless hours of emotional support [...] during field collections through their podcasts, The Adventure Zone and My Brother, My Brother, and Me."			
Nannaria swiftae Hennen, Means & Marek, 2022	Millipede	Taylor Swift	Named after the American singer-songwriter "in recognition of her talent as a songwriter and performer and in appreciation of the enjoyment her music has brought [the lead author]."			
Nelloptodes gretae Darby, 2019	Beetle	Greta Thunberg	Darby said he chose the name because he was "immensely impressed" by the Swedish teenager's environmental campaigning. By naming the beetle after Ms Thunberg, he said, he "wanted to acknowledge her outstanding contribution in raising awareness of environmental issues".			
Nemoura hugekootinlokorum Wang, 2021	Stonefly	Hu Ge and Louis Koo	A species of spring stonefly from southwestern China, "named in honor of Mr. Ge Hu and Mr. Tin-Lok Koo, two renowned actors, as an appreciation for their contribution to elementary education and environmental preservation in the mountainous areas of western China."			
Neoponera gojira Troya & Lattke, 2022	Ant	Gojira	A termite-predator ponerine ant from Brazil, whose name "honors the French metal band Gojira, in recognition of their altruistic activism for the conservation of nature, as well as for supporting the rights of ancestral indigenous peoples living across Amazonia. Through their lyrics the band promotes an increasing awareness of our paramount, nonetheless usually neglected, biological diversity."			
Nereis mariellae Bergamo et al., 2023	Polychaete worm	Marielle Franco	This species was found off the coast of Rio de Janeiro state and named as "a tribute to the councilwoman of the city of Rio de Janeiro, Marielle Franco, an important fighter for human rights, who was found to have been murdered in 2018."			
Nymphargus dajomesae Masache-Sarango, Cisneros-Heredia & Ron, 2026	Frog	Neisi Dájomes	A glass frog from Ecuador, named "honoring Neisi Dajomes, the first Ecuadorian woman to win a gold medal at the Olympic Games"			
Ocellularia jacinda-arderniae A.J.Marshall, Blanchon, Lücking & de Lange (2019)	Lichen	Jacinda Ardern	A species native to New Zealand, "Named in honour of Jacinda Ardern (1980–), the 40th Prime Minister of New Zealand, and the third and youngest woman to hold that position. In bestowing this name, we also wish to acknowledge that Ocellularia jacinda-arderniae was discovered in 2018, the 125th anniversary of women's suffrage in New Zealand, making it all the more fitting that we name a lichen after a prominent female New Zealand politician."			
Opacuincola gretathunbergae Verhaegen & Haase, 2021	Freshwater snail	Greta Thunberg	"The dedicatee of this new species is the Swedish teenage climate activist Greta Thunberg. Starting with a single-person school strike and demonstration to save our climate she has sparked the global movement "Fridays for Future" supported primarily by young people and managed to finally get momentum in global politics toward action against climate change after warnings of scientists have been largely ignored for more than 30 years. We wish her and the movement the endurance necessary to keep the pressure up!"			
Ophiacantha oceani † Numberger-Thuy & Thuy, 2020	Brittle star	The Ocean	A fossil species from the Pliocene and Pleistocene of Sicily, Italy. "Species named in honour of progressive metal band 'The Ocean'. Musicians who so skillfully combine arts and science, composing albums like Precambrian (with songs named after the periods of the Precambrian), Pelagial (with songs named after the bathymetric subdivisions of the water column) and Phanerozoic as well as the song "Turritopsis dohrnii" referring to the immortal jellyfish from the Mediterranean, are more than deserving of being immortalized in the fossil record."			
Ophiocoma avatar † Thuy & Numberger-Thuy, 2023	Brittle star	Avatar	A fossil species from the Cretaceous of Sweden, "named in honour of Swedish metal band Avatar, to honour their outstanding musical creativity that has been inspiring our research activities during the last years."			
Ophioduplantiera † Thuy, Numberger-Thuy & Pineda-Enríquez, 2021	Brittle star	Joe Duplantier and Mario Duplantier	A fossil genus from the Jurassic of Austria, "named after Joseph (Joe) and Mario Duplantier of French metal band Gojira, to honour their inspiring artistic achievements and their authentic, compassionate personalities."			
Ophiogojira † Thuy, Numberger-Thuy & Pineda-Enríquez, 2021	Brittle star	Gojira	A fossil genus from the Jurassic of France and Luxembourg, "named in honour of French metal band Gojira, for producing songs of an unfathomable intensity, beautifully dark and heavy, and exploring the abyss of life and death, of human strength and error, and of thriving and yet threatened oceans."			
Ophiogojira andreui † Thuy, Numberger-Thuy & Pineda-Enríquez, 2021	Brittle star	Christian Andreu	A fossil species from the Jurassic of Luxembourg, named after the guitar player of French metal band Gojira.			
Ophiojagtus acklesi † Thuy, 2013	Brittle star	Jensen Ackles	A fossil species from the Cretaceous of Texas, US, "named in honour of Texas-born actor Jensen Ackles; my wife urged me to do so."			
Ophiolofsson archspire † Thuy, Eriksson, Kutscher & Numberger-Thuy, 2024	Brittle star	Archspire	A fossil species from the Silurian of Gotland, Sweden "named after Canadian, technical death metal band, Archspire, in recognition of their transcendent form of this music style while simultaneously building on the tradition formed by the progenitor bands." (This is the most recent species known in this genus).			
Ophiomisidium pratchettae † Thuy & Numberger-Thuy, 2021	Brittle star	Rhianna Pratchett	A fossil species from the Jurassic of Luxembourg. "Species named in honour of English video game writer and journalist Rhianna Pratchett, for her gamebook Crystal of Storms that reinvigorated stamina in moments of frustration during work on the present study."			
Ophiomitrella floorae † Thuy, Numberger-Thuy & Jagt, 2020	Brittle star	Floor Jansen	A fossil species from the Cretaceous of the Netherlands, named after Dutch singer "Floor Jansen, lead singer of the Finnish band Nightwish in recognition of her long-standing career in metal, her general interest in all things (palaeo)biological and her and the band's use of fossils for artwork."			
Orbamia abiyi Hausmann & Tujuba, 2020	Moth	Abiy Ahmed	An African geometer moth whose name "honours his Excellency Dr Abiy Ahmed Ethiopia's Prime Minister, the 2019 Nobel Peace Prize Laureate, for his tremendous contributions to Ethiopia and the Horn of African geopolitics."			
Orbiniella mayhemi Meca & Budaeva, 2024	Polychaete worm	Mayhem	"The species is named in honour to the Norwegian Black Metal band from Oslo, Mayhem, one of the bands that most contributed to the development of the Norwegian Black Metal in the 90s. [The lead author] was listening to their music to endure the darkest hours in the lab."			
Ornodolomedes mickfanningi Raven & Hebron, 2018	Spider	Mick Fanning	A species of fishing spider from Queensland, Australia, named "in honour of Australian surfer, Mick Fanning, whose path to surfing greatness has incorporated all the attributes of a champion, including overcoming personal tragedy, career-threatening injury and one of sport's greatest competitive dynasties to reach surfing's highest echelon three times. He has a love for water and has a strong Queensland connection with his favourite "break" being at Queensland's iconic Snapper Rocks at Coolangatta."			
Oxelytrum nairoi Amat-García & Valcárcel, 2014	Beetle	Nairo Quintana	A carrion beetle native to Colombia, "dedicated to the Colombian sportsman Nairo Quintana, one of the "escarabajos" of the new generation of Colombian cyclists, winner of the 2014 Giro d'Italia."			
Paracidaris eluveitie † Hostettler & Menkveld-Gfeller, 2015	Sea urchin	Eluveitie	A fossil species from the Jurassic of Switzerland. "The species name refers to the Etruscan form of the Celtic word Helvetios ("the Helvetian"), Eluveitie. [...] The species is dedicated to the Swiss band Eluveitie, which combines Celtic folklore with metal sound in its music. The detailed sculptures of corona and spines of this regular sea urchin are also reminiscent of "Celtic gold" (jewellery and vessels of the Helvetians)."			
Paragorgia jamesi Herrera & Shank, 2016	Coral	James Rodríguez	"Named in honor of James David Rodríguez Rubio, arguably the best Colombian professional football (soccer) player in history."			
Parakoldinioidia lopezi † Westrop & Adrain, 2014	Trilobite	Martín López	Five species in this genus were concurrently named after members of Opeth (see also List of organisms named after famous people (born 1950–1974)).			
Parakoldinioidia mendezi † Westrop & Adrain, 2014	Trilobite	Martín Méndez	Five species in this genus were concurrently named after members of Opeth (see also List of organisms named after famous people (born 1950–1974)).			
Pararhagadochir marielleae Szumik, Pereyra & Juárez, 2022	Webspinner	Marielle Franco	A species from Brazil named as "a tribute to Marielle Franco, a Brazilian human rights activist, a symbol of the fight against social inequality and in favor of the rights of black women in Brazil."			
Pararoncus leonardi Jeong & Harms, 2024	Pseudoscorpion	Kawhi Leonard	A species from South Korea, whose most notable aspect is the far reach between one clawed leg and another, far exceeding the length of the body; "named in honor of the National Basketball Association player Kawhi Leonard who has the longest wingspan in the American National Basketball Association."			
Pararoncus taeyoungi Jeong & Harms, 2024	Pseudoscorpion	Mun Tae-yeong	A species from South Korea, whose most notable aspect is the far reach between one clawed leg and another, far exceeding the length of the body; "named after the former Korean Basketball League player Tae Young Moon who has the longest wingspan ratio in the Korean Basketball League."			
Paroligoneurus harishi Ranjith & van Achterberg, 2020	Wasp	Harish Sivaramakrishnan	A species native to India, "dedicated to Mr. Harish Sivaramakrishnan, Carnatic singer and vocalist of Agam band for his continuing journey in the realm of independent music, imaginative talk and making many listeners to think 'out of the box'."			
Penicillium alexiae Visagie, Houbraken & Samson, 2013	Fungus	Princess Alexia of the Netherlands	Five species of Penicillium fungi identified from strains stored at the CBS-KNAW Fungal Biodiversity Centre in Utrecht, Netherlands, were named after the members of the Dutch royal family to coincide with the coronation of Willem-Alexander of the Netherlands (see also List of organisms named after famous people (born 1950–1974)).			
Penicillium amaliae Visagie, Houbraken & Jacobs, 2013	Fungus	Catharina-Amalia, Princess of Orange	Five species of Penicillium fungi identified from strains stored at the CBS-KNAW Fungal Biodiversity Centre in Utrecht, Netherlands, were named after the members of the Dutch royal family to coincide with the coronation of Willem-Alexander of the Netherlands (see also List of organisms named after famous people (born 1950–1974)).			
Penicillium arianeae Visagie, Houbraken & Samson, 2013	Fungus	Princess Ariane of the Netherlands	Five species of Penicillium fungi identified from strains stored at the CBS-KNAW Fungal Biodiversity Centre in Utrecht, Netherlands, were named after the members of the Dutch royal family to coincide with the coronation of Willem-Alexander of the Netherlands (see also List of organisms named after famous people (born 1950–1974)).			
Pentaceration bifficlyro Kaiser & Marner, 2012	Crustacean	Biffy Clyro	"derived from the band Biffy Clyro, which boosted the mood throughout the description of the new species."			
Percnarcha claudiadoblesae Metz, 2020	Moth	Claudia Dobles Camargo	"named in honor of Claudia Dobles Camargo, First Lady of Costa Rica and dedicated biopolitical force for Costa Rica's survival and socioeconomic development as a truly green tropical country that is on its way to becoming bioliterate while being an exemplary tropical country for controlling, mitigating and reducing its contributions to climate change."			
Phlebotomus simonahalepae Cazan, Erisoz Kasap & Mihalca, 2021	Fly	Simona Halep	"The species is dedicated to the famous tennis player Simona Halep, born in the same county as the type locality." The authors "were very happy afterwards to receive Simona Halep's agreement, through her legal officer, who informed us that she was honoured by our initiative. [...] We dedicate this scientific discovery to Simona Halep, as a sign of honour and recognition for her performance and for the way she bears Romania's name in the world, as we also do in the field of research."			
Pholcus youngae Huber, 2011	Spider	Tata Young	This cellar spider native to Thailand. Subsequently transferred to genus Cantikus.			
Pleurothallis franciana Sierra-Ariza	Orchid	Francia Márquez	A bonnet orchid native to Colombia, "Named to honor Francia Elena Márquez Mina, Vice-president of the Republic of Colombia (2022–2026), social leader, environmental activist, and Goldman Prize winner (2018), her work has been of vital importance in the social struggles in Colombia. She carried out activities supporting the conservation of rivers, customs, and the territory of the Afro-Colombian people. She is a tireless fighter against indiscriminate mining." Another species in the same genus was concurrently named after president Gustavo Petro (see List of organisms named after famous people (born 1950–1974)).			
Podistra mattheseni † Fanti & Damgaard, 2020	Beetle	Anders Matthesen	A fossil soldier beetle found in Eocene Baltic amber.			
Pristimantis gretathunbergae Mebert et al., 2022	Frog	Greta Thunberg	"... in honor for Greta Thunberg, a Swedish student, and her global climate activism. [...] Greta Thunberg represents the authentic voice that exposes the motivations behind the diplomatic curtain of politicians and business stakeholders. Her voice is essential if we want to revert to and maintain a healthy environment on the planet we all share, and not least, learn to respect its magnificent mega-diversity of life that took millions of years to evolve."			
Pristimantis urani Rivera-Correa & Daza, 2016	Frog	Rigoberto Urán	"The specific name is a patronym for Rigoberto (Rigo) Urán, a Colombian cyclist born in Urrao, Antioquia, type locality of the new species. Rigo Uran represents, despite adversity, the struggle to become a great athlete. The new taxon is native to the northern Andes, mountains widely conquered by the Colombian cyclists."			
Pritha garfieldi Marusik & Zamani, 2015	Spider	Andrew Garfield	Garfield starred in three Spider-Man films.			
Pseudohystricurus wigglesorum † Adrain, Karim & Westrop, 2014	Trilobite	The Wiggles				
Psyllipsocus mili † Weingardt, Liang & Yoshizawa, 2025	Barklouse	Mili	A fossil species found in Cretaceous Burmese amber, named "to honor the music group Mili and their incredible music and art."			
Relictorygmus trevornoahi Seidel, Minoshima, Arriaga-Varela & Fikáček, 2018	Beetle	Trevor Noah	A water scavenger beetle from South Africa, "dedicated to the South African comedian Trevor Noah whose performances were a welcomed entertainment to the first author."			
Remyella spanovicae Ćurčić, Vrbica & Vesović, 2025	Beetle	Ivana Španović	This troglobitic species, endemic to a cave in Serbia, "is named after Ivana Španović, a famous Serbian athlete, one of the greatest female long jumpers of all time. She is the reigning world champion, two-time world indoor champion, two-time European champion, three-time European indoor champion, five-time winner of the Diamond League Trophy and Olympic medalist in the women's long jump."			
Rhinocosmetus gretathunbergae Vanuytven, Jocqué & Deeleman-Reinhold, 2024	Spider	Greta Thunberg	"in honour of Greta Thunberg, the Swedish environmentalist known for challenging world leaders to take immediate action to mitigate the climate change."			
Rhinoliparus nafithiamae Vanuytven, Jocqué & Deeleman-Reinhold, 2024	Spider	Nafissatou Thiam	This species was described by Belgian scientists.			
Sacoproteus nishae Krug et al., 2018	Sea slug	Nisha Ayub	"Named in honor of Nisha Ayub, Malaysian transgender activist and recipient of the International Women of Courage Award 2016, who was born in the state of Malacca where specimens were collected. We honor her courage in the fight for equality and protection of all people."			
Salvia messii P.Gonzáles & Uría	Flowering plant	Lionel Messi	"The specific epithet messii honours Lionel Andrés Messi Cuccittini (1987–), whose outstanding sporting career has inspired millions of people around the world through perseverance, humility, and excellence. The dedication is also inspired by the pale blue and white corollas of the species, which recall the colours of the Argentine national flag, creating an indirect association between this Peruvian endemic plant and the Argentinian popular icon."			
Sarcohyla gretae Kaplan, Heimes, McCormack & Torres Pérez-Coeto, 2025	Frog	Greta Thunberg	"This species is named after Greta Thunberg to honor her commitment and unrelenting efforts to protect our planet."			
Scaptia beyonceae Lessard, 2011	Fly	Beyoncé Knowles	The horse fly was named after the singer and actress because of its striking golden behind.			
Sciophila holopaineni Salmela, 2017	Fly	Tuomas Holopainen	A fungus gnat native to Finland and Karelia, "named after Mr. Tuomas Holopainen, the founder, songwriter and keyboardist of a Finnish metal band, Nightwish." "I am very, very touched," Holopainen said in a statement, "This is the highest honor a nature nerd like me can receive."			
Shakiremys † Cadena et al., 2025	Turtle	Shakira	A fossil genus from the Miocene of Colombia, named "In honour of Shakira, a Colombian singer who has inspired generations with her music and dance; music that has accompanied the first author's fieldwork for decades. Shakira also serves as an example of uniqueness, much like the fossil turtle described herein."			
Sibogasyrinx elbakyanae Kantor, Puillandre & Bouchet, 2021	Sea snail	Alexandra Elbakyan				
Sicoderus bautistai Anderson, 2018	Weevil	José Bautista	This species is native to the Dominican Republic.			
Sinosura dieschbourgae † Thuy & Numberger-Thuy, 2021	Brittle star	Carole Dieschbourg	A fossil species from the Jurassic of Luxembourg. "Species named after Carole Dieschbourg, Luxembourg environment minister at the time of publication of this paper, for her achievements towards a more sustainable society, but also as an incentive to pursue a rigorous, science-based policy towards climate change mitigation."			
Sparasion elbakyanae Veenakumari, 2023	Wasp	Alexandra Elbakyan	"This species is named in honour of Alexandra Elbakyan, the intrepid crusader from the Republic of Kazakhstan, who by founding the website Sci-Hub, took on the giants of the publishing industry in her quest to democratize knowledge by 'removing all barriers in access to scientific knowledge'."			
Spathaspora brunopereirae Santos et al. (2023)	Yeast	Bruno Pereira	A species collected in the Amazon rainforest, where Pereira was murdered, and named in his honor as a tribute for his work in defence of the environment.			
Spathiopteryx ferrandprevotae † Brazidec & Perrichot, 2026	Wasp	Pauline Ferrand-Prévot	A fossil species found in Cretaceous Charentese amber.			
Spathoglottis jetsuniae Gyeltshen, Tobgyel & Dalström	Orchid	Jetsun Pema	A purple orchid from Bhutan, "named in loving and respectful honor of Her Majesty the Queen Jetsun Pema Wangchuck of Bhutan, who has a dedicated and sincere interest in the protection of the environment and the wild flora and fauna of Bhutan."			
Speos fyssasii Panou & Gkelis, 2021	Bacterium	Pavlos Fyssas	A cyanobacterium isolated from a cave in Greece and named "in tribute to Pavlos Fyssas (1979–2013) a Greek musician and activist, murdered by a member of the criminal organization Golden Dawn."			
Spigelia elbakyaniae S.Islas & L.O.Alvarado	Flowering plant	Alexandra Elbakyan	Its name "honors Alexandra Elbakyan, founder of Sci-Hub, "a project created to make the knowledge free". Her program has been helpful to access articles, books, and journals, which otherwise would be out of the financial reach for most students." It was originally described as Spigelia elbakyanii, but this name was emended by the authors because the "correct termination, however, for an epithet dedicated to a woman (Alexandra Elbakyan) is -iae, instead of -ii".			
Stammericaris galichai Cottarelli & Bruno, 2025	Crustacean	Rodne Galicha	"The new species is dedicated to Rodne Rodiño Galicha, Filipino environmentalist and human rights activist, born in Sibuyan Island [the type locality], in recognition of its involvement in biodiversity conservation and natural resources conservation."			
Stenoterommata gugai Indicatti et al., 2017	Spider	Gustavo Kuerten	"The specific name is a patronym in honor of Gustavo Kuerten, known by the nickname, Guga. He is a retired former professional tennis player who was born in Florianópolis, Santa Catarina, Brazil [the type locality] [...]. In 2000, he reached the No. 1 position in world ranking of Association of Tennis Professionals. He has received honors from several institutions related to tennis and social activities."			
Sticta gretae Di Meglio & Goward (2023)	Lichen	Greta Thunberg	"Gretae honors the iconic Swedish climate activist Greta Thunberg (b. 2003) in recognition of her sustained efforts to secure a habitable future, mobilizing the world's young people to persuade nation government leaders for more aggressive climate action for both humans and lichens alike."			
Strongylophthalmyia federeri Evenhuis, 2016	Fly	Roger Federer	"This species is named for tennis champion Roger Federer because of the distinctive racquet-shaped male palpus."			
Swiftiephylus Schroeder & Weirauch, 2026	True bug	Taylor Swift	A genus of plant bugs "Named for the artist Taylor Swift, in recognition of her showstopping talent, heart-wrenching lyrics, and the joy and comfort she has brought to many. The term "Swifitie" refers to Swift's loving fanbase. Combined with the generic name Phylus." The type species is named S. taylorae after the singer; other species are named after her albums: S. amator (for Lover), S. intrepidus (for Fearless) and S. poetorum (for The Tortured Poets Department).			
Tanaella quintanai Morales-Núñez & Ardila, 2019	Crustacean	Nairo Quintana	A species of tanaid described from specimens collected off the Caribbean coast of Colombia, "Named in honor of renowned Colombian racing cyclist Nairo Alexander Quintana Rojas, in recognition and appreciation for his outstanding effort and dedication, as well as for bringing pride and happiness to the Colombian nation."			
Tanidromites nightwishorum † Klompmaker, Starzyk, Fraaije & Schweigert, 2020	Crustacean	Nightwish	A fossil crab from the Jurassic of eastern Austria. "Named in honor of the members of the symphonic metal band Nightwish (Troy Donockley, Kai Hahto, Marko Hietala, Tuomas Holopainen, Floor Jansen, and Emppu Vuorinen), in particular for their 2015 album Endless Forms Most Beautiful about the evolution of life."			
Thaumatodryinus tuukkaraski Olmi, Copeland & Guglielmino, 2015	Wasp	Tuukka Rask	"This species is named after Tuukka Rask, the acrobatic goaltender for the Finnish National ice hockey team and the Boston Bruins, whose glove hand is as tenacious as the raptorial fore tarsus of this dryinid species."			
Thunberga Jäger, 2020	Spider	Greta Thunberg	A genus of huntsman spiders endemic to Madagascar, "Named after Greta Thunberg (*2003 in Sweden), a young and courageous climate activist fighting against global warming, ignorant stakeholders and for a better future on our planet. In fact, global warming and other issues caused by humans affect all parts of the nature including Madagascar's nature in general and its spider fauna in particular."			
Thunberga boyanslat Jäger, 2021	Spider	Boyan Slat	"named for the inventor and entrepreneur Boyan Slat (*1994 in the Netherlands) for initiating the ocean clean-up"			
Thunberga greta Jäger, 2020	Spider	Greta Thunberg	"The species is named for Greta Thunberg (*2003 in Sweden) for her strong commitment for a better future on our planet"			
Thunberga jyoti Jäger, 2021	Spider	Jyoti Kumari	"named for the 15-year-old girl Jyoti Kumari from India who drove her ailing father with her bicycle 1200 km from Sikandarpur (Haryana) to Darbhanga (Bihar) to allow him treatment in his home village; the name is chosen for all loving and caring persons on our planet"			
Thunberga malala Jäger, 2021	Spider	Malala Yousafzai	"The species honours Malala Yousafzai (*1997 in Pakistan), an activist for female education and children's rights and the youngest Nobel Prize laureate in history"			
Thunbergia gretae Martens, 2020	Harvestman	Greta Thunberg	"Named in honour of Greta Thunberg, the initiator of the single-person campaign 'Skolstrejk för klimatet' in Sweden. Her personal initiative developed into a large international movement, consisting mainly of young people in many countries worldwide, and now known as 'Fridays for Future'. The campaign demands consequent and stringent global action to protect the Earth's climate. The morphological peculiarity of the new species described here, an effective claw or pincer, may be taken as an allusion to the single-minded and tenacious energy applied by Greta Thunberg to the aims of the campaign."			
Tianchisaurus nedegoapeferima † Dong, 1993	Dinosaur	Sam Neill, Laura Dern, Jeff Goldblum, Richard Attenborough, Bob Peck, Martin Ferrero, Ariana Richards, and Joseph Mazzello	Actors involved in the 1993 film Jurassic Park: Neill, Dern, Goldblum, Attenborough, Peck, Ferrero, Richards, and Mazzello. The type specimen was informally referred to as "Jurassosaurus". The species name was proposed by director Steven Spielberg.			
Tinaegeria carlosalvaradoi Metz, 2020	Moth	Carlos Alvarado	"named in honor of Carlos Alvarado Quesada, President of Costa Rica, who is philosophically and practically dedicated to facilitating Costa Rica's continued growth into being the most green tropical country of all. He encourages Costa Rican bioliteracy for conservation of its wild biodiversity, which is relevant to the forests in which his patronym moth lives."			
Tmesisternus floorjansenae Weigel, 2018	Beetle	Floor Jansen	Jansen wrote on her website: "How special to have the honor of having a beautiful animal named after me."			
Topiris thunbergella Sterling & Lees, 2025	Moth	Greta Thunberg	A timber moth from Thailand "named in honour of the climate change activist Greta Thunberg, in recognition of her work in raising consciousness of the potentially catastrophic pressures on the natural environment in places where this species and the other species reviewed in this paper occur."			
Torrenticola oliveri Fisher et al., 2017	Mite	John Oliver	"Named in honor of comedian John Oliver and his team, whose commentary on Last Week Tonight breaches the realm of comedy and enters journalism. News and politics, like science, require both challenging misinformation and effectively communicating those challenges—tasks Oliver has humbly mastered."			
Travunijana djokovici Grego & Pešić, 2021	Snail	Novak Djokovic	"named after Novak Djokovic, a famous Serbian tennis player, to acknowledge his inspiring enthusiasm and energy." "I don't know how symbolic this is, because throughout my career I always tried to be fast and then a snail was named after me," Djokovic said, cracking a laugh. "Maybe it's a message for me, telling me to slow down a bit!" "I am honoured that a new species of snail was named after me because I am a big fan of nature and ecosystems and I appreciate all kinds of animals and plants," Djokovic added. "I try to live in harmony with nature. The news made me laugh."			
Troporhogas rafaelnadali Quicke, Loncle & Butcher, 2024	Wasp	Rafael Nadal				
Troporhogas rogerfedereri Quicke, Loncle & Butcher, 2024	Wasp	Roger Federer				
Tuleaspis jeneki † McAdams, Adrain & Karim, 2018	Trilobite	Courtney Act	Named after Courtney Act's birth name, Shane Jenek.			
Ummidia brandicarlileae Godwin & Bond, 2021	Spider	Brandi Carlile	"in honor of Brandi Carlile, an American singer-songwriter who, along with Tim and Phil Hanseroth, established the Looking Out Foundation, which raises money and awareness for numerous causes to include supporting child victims of war, world hunger, LGBT rights, and the empowerment of women. Carlile founded the annual Girls Just Wanna Weekend Festival to counter the lack of female representation at mainstream music festivals, which takes place near the type locality for this species."			
Uroballus nazirwanii Prajapati, Malamel & Sebastian, 2020	Spider	Nazir Ahmad Wani	A jumping spider from India, whose name "is a tribute to the hero of India, Lance Naik Nazir Ahmad Wani, AC, a soldier of the Indian Territorial Army. He was posthumously awarded with the Ashoka Chakra (India's highest peacetime military decoration) for his tremendous actions in several major counter-insurgency operations in Kashmir."			
Venomius tomhardyi Rossi, Castanheira, Baptista & Framenau, 2023	Spider	Tom Hardy	The monotypic genus Venomius had been named after the Marvel Comics character Venom, and the species was named "in reference to the English actor Edward Thomas 'Tom' Hardy, who plays the character Eddie Brock and his alter-ego Venom in the super-hero films of the same name."			
Volvarina rhiannae Ortea, 2021	Sea snail	Rihanna	"Named in honour of Rhianna [sic] Fenty, talent, beauty and commitment, considered the most successful artist of the 21st century, of whom a personality like Barack Obama highlighted her powerful force in the struggle to give dignity to people. The holotype was collected in her hometown, Saint Michael (Barbados), a curious coincidence to pay tribute to a universal Barbadian." The author also mentioned Rihanna's status as a National Hero of Barbados and her involvement in the Believe Foundation and the Clara Lionel Foundation.			
Vultur messii † Degrange et al., 2023	Condor	Lionel Messi	A fossil species of condor from the Pliocene of Argentina, named "Honouring the Argentinean football player Lionel Andrés Messi, one of the best of our times, who, being captain and best player, together with an outstanding team won the FIFA World Cup in Qatar 2022."			
Wahydra graslieae A. Warren, Carneiro, & Dolibaina, 2018	Butterfly	Emily Graslie	"We are delighted to name this species in honor of Emily Graslie, Chief Curiosity Correspondent at the Field Museum (Chicago, Illinois, USA), in recognition of her efforts to promote natural history collections through her YouTube channel The Brain Scoop"			
Xerobiotus gretae Massa et al., 2021	Tardigrade	Greta Thunberg	This species is native to Sweden. "We dedicate this species to the climate activist Greta Thunberg, for her brave and insightful efforts to open the eyes of the world leaders about the need for action against climate change. The achievements of Greta Thunberg give us hope that the challenges of changing the unsustainable path of human societies may still be possible, just like the tiny tardigrades are able to overcome seemingly impossible environmental challenges. But we have to act now!"			
Xyphinus rogerfedereri Kranz-Baltensperger, 2014	Spider	Roger Federer	"Because of the male palpal apophysis, which resembles a tennis racket, this species is dedicated to Roger Federer, the best tennis player ever."			

== See also ==
- List of bacterial genera named after personal names
- List of rose cultivars named after people
- List of taxa named by anagrams
- List of organisms named after the Harry Potter series
