= Penicillium vanoranjei =

Scientific classification
- Kingdom: Fungi
- Division: Ascomycota
- Class: Eurotiomycetes
- Order: Eurotiales
- Family: Aspergillaceae
- Genus: Penicillium
- Species: P. vanoranjei

Binomial name
- Penicillium vanoranjei Visagie, Houbraken, & K. Jacobs (2013)

Species of fungus

Penicillium vanoranjei (orange penicillium) is an orange-colored fungus first described in 2013 from specimens collected in Tunisia. It was named after the Prince of Orange (Dutch: Prins van Oranje) Willem-Alexander to commemorate his coronation as King of the Netherlands.

== Description ==
Penicillium vanoranjei is distinguished from related species by an unusual bright-orange sclerotia when in colonies; the research team who identified it called the color "astonishing; none of our researchers had ever seen anything like it before." The sclerotia have well-defined, complex internal structure. Conidiophores are monoverticillate (unbranched). The cell walls of fungus have a distinct roughening. It produces an external cell-matrix that might help protect it against dehydration during times of drought. Colonies of P. vanoranjei are slightly raised in the center; mycelia are white near the margins.

Penicillium vanoranjei was identified using a combination of morphological traits and genetic analysis on soil samples taken from Tunisia. It is unknown whether the fungus can be used to make penicillin.

In May 2014, the International Institute for Species Exploration listed P. vanoranjei as one of the "Top 10 News Species" named in 2013.

== Taxonomic history ==
Penicillium vanoranjei and four other similar species – Penicillium maximae, Penicillium amaliae, Penicillium alexiae, and Penicillium arianeae – were set to be named in April 2013. That same month, Prince of Orange (Dutch: Prins van Oranje) Willem-Alexander was set to become the king of Netherlands. Inspired by the orange colors of P. vanoranjei, Pedro Crous and his colleagues at the CBS-KNAW Fungal Biodiversity Centre decided to "pay a humorous but respectful tribute by naming the new moulds after the new King of the Netherlands and his family." The species were formally described in the journal Persoonia.

The naming attracted attention on social media, and was covered by international media. In the Netherlands, the naming was especially well-covered including TV news stories and radio interviews of the paper's authors. The Penicillium species are not the first to be named after royalty, though. For example, the lily Victoria regia was named after the United Kingdom's Queen Victoria.
