= Waorani of Pastaza vs. Ecuadorian State =

- Court: TRIBUNAL DE GARANTÍAS PENALES CON SEDE EN EL CANTÓN PASTAZA
- Decided: May 21, 2019
- Transcript: https://www.derechosdelanaturaleza.org.ec/wp-content/uploads/2019/07/SENTENCIA-PRIMER-NIVEL.pdf Appeal: https://www.derechosdelanaturaleza.org.ec/wp-content/uploads/2019/07/SENTENCIA-APELACI%C3%93N.pdf

Case history
- Appealed to: SALA MULTICOMPETENTE DE LA CORTE PROVINCIAL DE PASTAZA
- Subsequent action: Upheld July 19, 2019

Waorani of Pastaza vs. Ecuadorian State was a 2019 court case filed against the Ecuadorian State by indigenous communities of the Amazon rainforest regions. The CONCONAWEP (Coordinating Council of the Waorani Nationality of Ecuador-Pastaza) filed a suit in the Pastaza Provincial Court alleging that the Ecuadorian government was selling Waorani indigenous land for oil drilling without proper informed consent or consultation. The judges ruled in favor of the Waorani people, stopping projects on their land and setting precedent for informed consent and indigenous participation.

== Background ==
The Waorani people, an indigenous Ecuadorian tribe who number around 2,000, maintain one of the world’s most biodiverse ecosystems. They were the last indigenous Ecuadorians to be encountered, when missionaries entered their territory in the 1950s. Today they remain on only 10 percent of their ancestral lands in their territory near the Yasuni National Park.

Map of Waorani Territory and Yasuni National Park

Ecuador was the first country to codify the rights of nature within their constitution. Nonetheless, the Ecuadorian government is currently leasing 70 percent of the Ecuadorian Amazon for oil drilling. 16 Waorani communities fall primarily in a stretch of land labeled Block 22, which is rich in cultural history, flora, and fauna but was planned as a lease for further oil drilling.

== Court case ==
In 2018, after learning of plans to lease their land, the Waorani people accused the Ministry of Energy and Non-renewable Natural Resources, the Ministry of Environment, and the Secretary of Hydrocarbons of violating their constitutional right to self-determination, as well as their right to consultation on drilling in their land. The government had attempted to fulfill consultation requirements in 2012 by having Waorani sign attendance slips to short consultation meetings.

In order to strengthen their case, the Waorani people underwent endeavor’s to properly map their territories. Using Digital Democracy software and working with Alianza Ceibo, Waorani leaders and tribe members mapped resources and cultural sites within their territory, alongside native ecosystems. This, along with the inadequate prior consultation became an integral part of their argument. They filed with legal assistance from Amazon Frontlines and the Defensoría del Pueblo. The official plaintiff in the case was Nemonte Nenquimo. The suit was co-filed by CONCAWEP— of which Nenquimo is a member— and the human rights Ombudsman of Ecuador.

The court ruled in favor of the Waorani people, setting a precedent of environmental justice and protecting around 180,000 hectares of Waorani land from auction and drilling.

== Decision ==
A panel of three judges ruled in favor of the Waorani people on May 21, 2019, immediately stopping the sale of around 500,000 total acres of land to oil companies. They determined that the consultations that took place in 2012 were unlawful. It was later upheld by an appellate court who also ordered that the government officials involved in the illegal prior consultation process be investigated for wrongdoing. This decision also has set a precedent for other indigenous tribes in Ecuador. At the time of the decision, 7 million acres of land on indigenous territory. This case cements the legal right to informed consent and right to self determination, presenting a challenge in those areas as well as future cases to come.
