= Craspedotropis borneensis =

Scientific classification
- Domain: Eukaryota
- Kingdom: Animalia
- Phylum: Mollusca
- Class: Gastropoda
- Subclass: Caenogastropoda
- Order: Architaenioglossa
- Superfamily: Cyclophoroidea
- Family: Cyclophoridae
- Genus: Craspedotropis
- Species: C. borneensis

Binomial name
- Craspedotropis borneensis (Godwin-Austen, 1889)

Synonyms
- Ditropis (Ditropis) borneensis (Godwin-Austen, 1889) (unaccepted combination); Jerdonia borneensis Godwin-Austen, 1889 (original combination)

Species of land snail

Craspedotropis borneensis is a species of snail in the family Cyclophoridae. It was described by Henry Haversham Godwin-Austen.

== Distribution ==
This species occurs on Borneo in Sarawak, Malaysia.
