= Nelloptodes gretae =

Scientific classification
- Kingdom: Animalia
- Phylum: Arthropoda
- Clade: Pancrustacea
- Class: Insecta
- Order: Coleoptera
- Suborder: Polyphaga
- Infraorder: Staphyliniformia
- Family: Ptiliidae
- Genus: Nelloptodes
- Species: N. gretae

Binomial name
- Nelloptodes gretae Darby, 2019

Species of beetle

Nelloptodes gretae is a species of beetle in the family Ptiliidae. It was described in October 2019 and named after the environmental activist Greta Thunberg. Its long antennae bear a passing resemblance to her braided pigtails.

== Description ==
The beetle is pale yellow and gold, and measures 0.79 millimetres long. It has no eyes or wings, and is distinguishable by a small pit found between where the eyes should go. Usually found in the leaf litter and soil, they feed on fungal hyphae and spores.

== Distribution ==
The newly described species was described from material originally collected in Kenya sometime between 1964 and 1965 by entomologist William C. Brock, who took samples of soil from around East Africa which were stored in the Museum's collections. This species is one of nine within the newly erected genus Nelloptodes from these samples.

== See also ==
- Craspedotropis gretathunbergae
- List of organisms named after famous people (born 1975–present)
