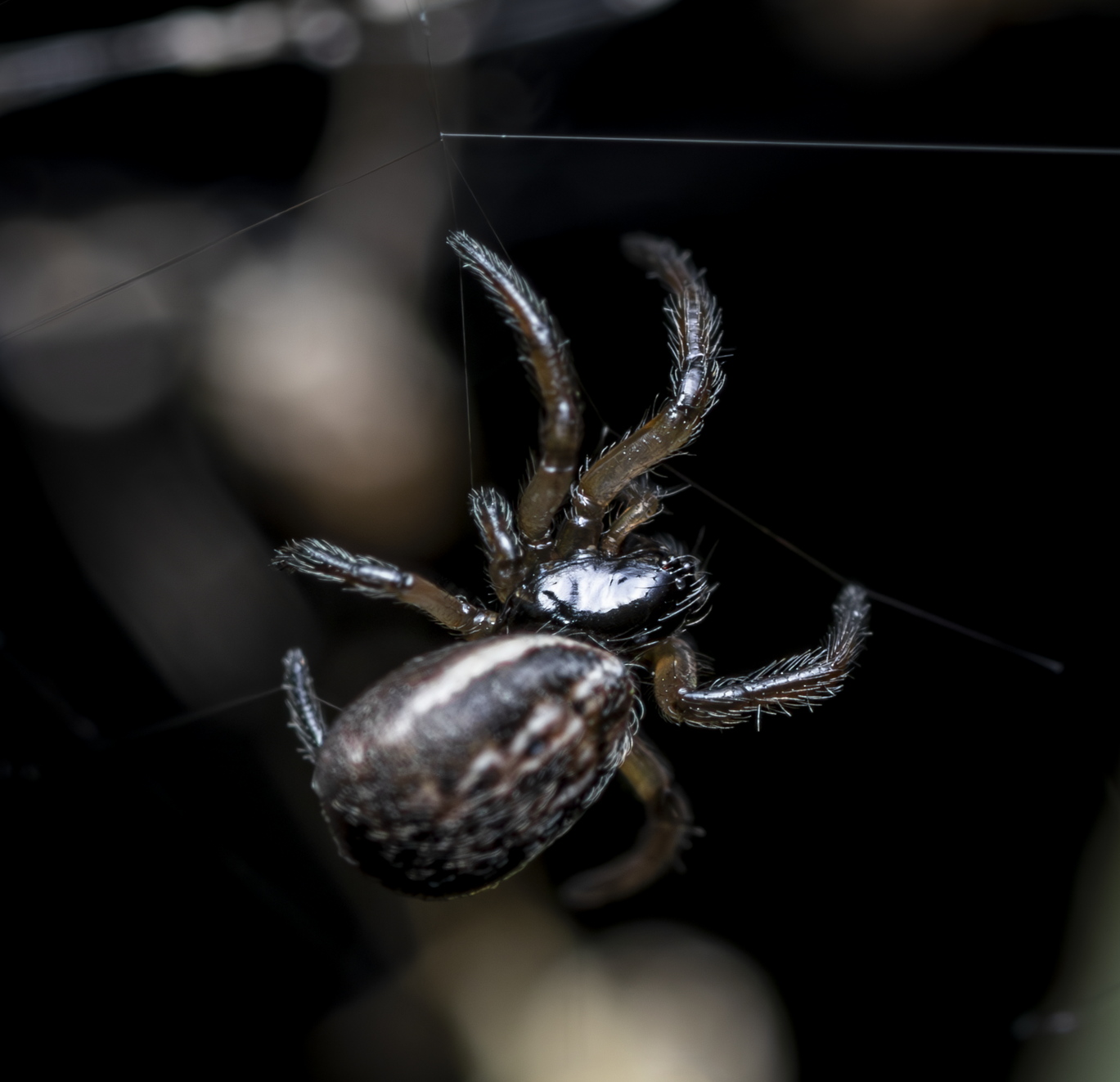
- V. tomhardyi near Adelaide

Scientific classification
- Kingdom: Animalia
- Phylum: Arthropoda
- Subphylum: Chelicerata
- Class: Arachnida
- Order: Araneae
- Infraorder: Araneomorphae
- Family: Araneidae
- Genus: Venomius; Rossi, Castanheira, Baptista & Framenau, 2023
- Species: V. tomhardyi

Binomial name
- Venomius tomhardyi Rossi, Castanheira, Baptista & Framenau, 2023

= Venomius =

Monotypic genus of spider

Venomius is a genus of orb-weaver spider endemic to southern Australia, where it is found from southern Western Australia east to Tasmania. It contains only a single species, V. tomhardyi.

It was named after the Marvel Comics character Venom, with its species name referencing actor Tom Hardy, who portrayed the character in Sony's Spider-Man Universe. The genus name came from the black spots on the spider's abdomen, which reminded the authors of Venom's head.

It physically resembles the genera Phonognatha and Leviana in morphology and coloration, but has very different genital morphology. It builds webs on exposed tree branches in bushland or forests near the coast, creating silk-lined holes.
