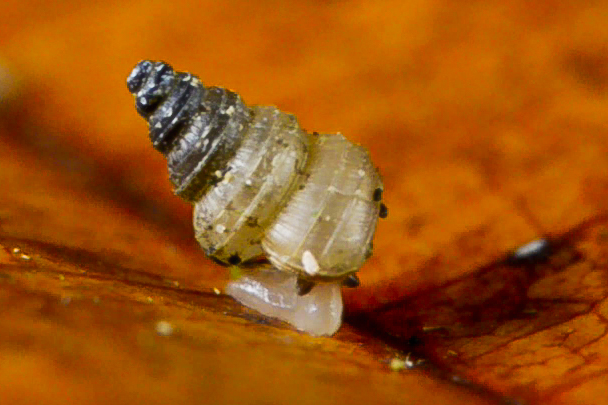
- Craspedotropis gretathunbergae

Scientific classification
- Kingdom: Animalia
- Phylum: Mollusca
- Class: Gastropoda
- Subclass: Caenogastropoda
- Order: Architaenioglossa
- Family: Cyclophoridae
- Tribe: Cyclophorini
- Genus: Craspedotropis; W.T. Blanford, 1864

Species
- Craspedotropis andrei Vermeulen, 1999; Craspedotropis bilirata (R. H. Beddome, 1875); Craspedotropis borneensis (Godwin-Austen, 1889); Craspedotropis cuspidata (W. H. Benson, 1851); Craspedotropis fimbriata Godwin-Austen, 1875; Craspedotropis gretathunbergae Schilthuizen, J. P. Lim, van Peursen, Alfano, Jenging, Cicuzza, A. Escoubas, P. Escoubas, Grafe, Ja, Koomen, Krotoski, Lavezzari, L. Lim, Maarschall, Slik, Steele, Ting, van Zeeland & Njunjić, 2020; Craspedotropis juvenilis Vermeulen, 1999; Craspedotropis salemensis (R. H. Beddome, 1875)

Synonyms
- Cyclophorus (Craspedotropis) W. T. Blanford, 1864; Lagocheilus (Craspedotropis) W. T. Blanford, 1864

= Craspedotropis =

Genus of gastropods

Craspedotropis is a genus of land snails in the family Cyclophoridae.

== Species ==
Species in the genus include:

- Craspedotropis andrei Vermeulen, 1999
- Craspedotropis bilirata Beddome, 1875
- Craspedotropis borneensis Godwin-Austen, 1889
- Craspedotropis cuspidata Benson, 1851
- Craspedotropis fimbrata Godwin-Austen, 1875
- Craspedotropis gretathunberga M. Schilthuizen, JP Lim, ADP van Peursen, M. Alfano, AB Jenging, D. Cicuzza, A. Escoubas, P. Escoubas, U. Grafe, J. Ja, P. Koomen, A. Krotoski, D. Lavezzari, L. Lim, R. Maarschall, F. Slik, D. Steele, DTW Ting, I. van Zeeland, I. Njunjić, 2020
- Craspedotropis juvenilis Vermeulen, 1999
- Craspedotropis salemensis Beddome, 1875

Species brought into synonymy

- † Craspedotropis resurrecta Oppenheim, 1890: synonym of † Tropidogyra resurrecta (Oppenheim, 1890) (new combination)
