= Cantikus v-notatus =

Scientific classification
- Kingdom: Animalia
- Phylum: Arthropoda
- Subphylum: Chelicerata
- Class: Arachnida
- Order: Araneae
- Infraorder: Araneomorphae
- Family: Pholcidae
- Genus: Cantikus
- Species: C. v-notatus

Binomial name
- Cantikus v-notatus (Thorell, 1878)

Synonyms
- Pholcus v-notatus Thorell, 1878; Pholcus dentifrons Thorell, 1898; Pholcus quinquenotatus Huber, 2011 (see § Taxonomy); Cantikus quinquenotatus (Huber, 2011)

Species of spider

Cantikus v-notatus is a species of spider in the family Pholcidae. It is found from Myanmar to Indonesia.

== Taxonomy ==
The species was originally described by Tamerlan Thorell in 1878 as Pholcus v-notatus, the "v" referring to the shape of the mark on the cephalothorax. Thorell wrote "∧ nigro in parte thoracica notato", 'marked with black ∧ in thoracic part'. In 2011, Huber published a classification of the family Pholcidae in which he used the specific name "quinquenotatus" for this species, expanding Thorell's "v" to the Latin word for five (V being 5 in Roman numerals). The same version of the specific name was used when the species was transferred to the new genus Cantikus in 2018 as a result of further molecular phylogenetic analysis. The World Spider Catalog uses Thorell's original form of the name, noting that the "v" refers to a mark, and so not to the numeral.

== See also ==
- List of Pholcidae species
