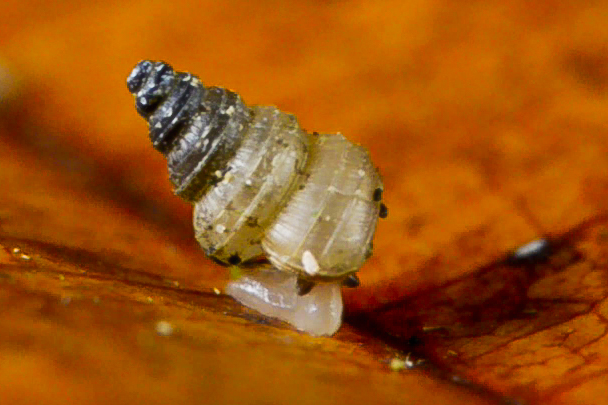

Scientific classification
- Kingdom: Animalia
- Phylum: Mollusca
- Class: Gastropoda
- Subclass: Caenogastropoda
- Order: Architaenioglossa
- Family: Cyclophoridae
- Genus: Craspedotropis
- Species: C. gretathunbergae

Binomial name
- Craspedotropis gretathunbergae Schilthuizen, J. P. Lim, van Peursen, Alfano, Jenging, Cicuzza, A. Escoubas, P. Escoubas, Grafe, Ja, Koomen, Krotoski, Lavezzari, L. Lim, Maarschall, Slik, Steele, Ting, van Zeeland & Njunjić, 2020

= Craspedotropis gretathunbergae =

Snail from Borneo named after Greta Thunberg

Craspedotropis gretathunbergae is a species of snail in the family Cyclophoridae. The species was discovered in Brunei by a team of citizen scientists and subsequently named after climate activist Greta Thunberg.

== Taxonomy ==
After the discovery of the species, a vote was conducted among the members of the expedition and the staff of the national park, and a decision was made to name it after Greta Thunberg. According to the scientists, this was a "way of acknowledging that her generation will be responsible for fixing problems that they did not create". The holotype was collected by citizen scientist J.P. Lim.

This is the second animal, after Nelloptodes gretae, to be named after Greta Thunberg.

== Description ==
The species is 2 mm long and 1 mm wide, with a concave shell, and grey tentacles. It is green-brown in color.

== Habitat and distribution ==
The species is endemic to Brunei. Specimens of the species were found on a steep hill, next to a river bank, while foraging at night on the green leaves of understory plants. The snail is very sensitive to change in temperature and climate.

== See also ==
- List of organisms named after famous people (born 1975–present)
