= Anolis nemonteae =

Scientific classification
- Kingdom: Animalia
- Phylum: Chordata
- Class: Reptilia
- Order: Squamata
- Suborder: Iguania
- Family: Anolidae
- Genus: Anolis
- Species: A. nemonteae

Binomial name
- Anolis nemonteae Ayala-Varela, Valverde, Poe, Narvaez, Yánez-Muñoz, & Torres-Carvajal, 2021

Species of lizard

Anolis nemonteae is a species of anole lizard first found in Ecuador. It's named after Nemonte Nenquimo.
