= Salvia messii =

Scientific classification
- Kingdom: Plantae
- Clade: Tracheophytes
- Clade: Angiosperms
- Clade: Eudicots
- Clade: Asterids
- Order: Lamiales
- Family: Lamiaceae
- Genus: Salvia
- Species: S. messii

Binomial name
- Salvia messii P.Gonzáles, Uría & Capcha-Ramos
- The assumed distribution of the Salvia messii

Species of plant

Salvia messii is a perennial, aromatic, evergreen subshrub in the genus Salvia. It is still not described in most databases like POWO, but its described in Phytotaxa. It was discovered in the Peruvian Andes during October 2026 and it is assumed to have a conservation status of endangered. Its flowers are mostly white but have light blue near the tips.

According to reasearchers, Salvia messii's native distribution is in Ica Department and Lima Department in mountainous areas.

== Taxonomy and etymology ==
It was first described in Phytotaxa in October 2026. It was named after famous Argentine footballer Lionel Messi since the flower's colors resembled Argentina's shirt in football. It is one of the 6 species named after Lionel Messi along with Liolaemus messii, Acanthogonatus messii, Discinisca messii, Vultur messii, and Cercopemyces messii.
