= Aspergillus sigurros =

Scientific classification
- Kingdom: Fungi
- Division: Ascomycota
- Class: Eurotiomycetes
- Order: Eurotiales
- Family: Aspergillaceae
- Genus: Aspergillus
- Species: A. sigurros

Binomial name
- Aspergillus sigurros Visagie

Species of fungus

Aspergillus sigurros is a species of fungi in the family Aspergillaceae. It was described by Cobus M. Visagie in 2020 in a scientific paper dedicated to Keith A. Seifert titled Updating the Taxonomy of Aspergillus in South Africa and named after Seifert's favorite band, Sigur Rós. When inhaled from mold by humans, it can cause Aspergillosis.

== See also ==
- List of organisms named after famous people (born 1975 - present)
