= Remyella (beetle) =

Scientific classification
- Kingdom: Animalia
- Phylum: Arthropoda
- Clade: Pancrustacea
- Class: Insecta
- Order: Coleoptera
- Suborder: Polyphaga
- Infraorder: Staphyliniformia
- Family: Leiodidae
- Genus: Remyella; Jeannel, 1931

Genus of insects

Remyella is a genus of beetles belonging to the family Leiodidae.

== Species ==
- Remyella hussoni Jeannel, 1934
- Remyella javorensis S. Ćurčić & B. Ćurčić, 2008
- Remyella propiformis Winkler, 1933
- Remyella raskae S. Ćurčić & B. Ćurčić, 2008
- Remyella scaphoides Jeannel, 1931
- Remyella spanovicae Ćurčić, Vrbica & Vesović, 2025
