= Hoya indaysarae =

Scientific classification
- Kingdom: Plantae
- Clade: Tracheophytes
- Clade: Angiosperms
- Clade: Eudicots
- Clade: Asterids
- Order: Gentianales
- Family: Apocynaceae
- Genus: Hoya
- Species: H. indaysarae

Binomial name
- Hoya indaysarae Medina, Villanueva, Kloppenburg, & Cabras, 2018

Species of plant

Hoya indaysarae, commonly known as the waxvine or common waxflower, is one of the species in the genus Hoya. It is a vine which was collected on April 23, 2017, on Central Dinagat Island, growing on an old Diospyros blancoi (kamagong) tree, near a river, not far from the mining region, at about 100 meters above sea level.

== Description ==
The leaves of H. indaysarae are smooth on both sides with whole edge, the base of the leaf sheet is round, peak is sharp or pointed, with internodes 8.0-9.0 cm; the petioles are smooth, with a diameter of 0.3 cm, and length of 1.2-1.3 cm. The peduncle is long, up to 22 cm. In a negative geotropic umbrella, 5-13 individual flowers with a diameter of 1.2 cm open (in the expanded state). The corolla lobes are bent back, the outer side of the blades is smooth, the inner papillary is pubescent in texture. The pinkish tips of the corolla lobes are wrapped back. The corolla and crown are creamy yellow in color. The flower is marked with pinkish color at the tip of the apex and measuring 1.4 cm.

== Etymology ==
The species was named after the former Davao City Mayor, and now Vice President of the Philippines Sara Duterte-Carpio, the daughter of 16th President Rodrigo Duterte, for her support in the environmental initiatives of the Caraga Region, and her support for nature conservation efforts in the region.
