= Escarabajo =

Colombian cyclist

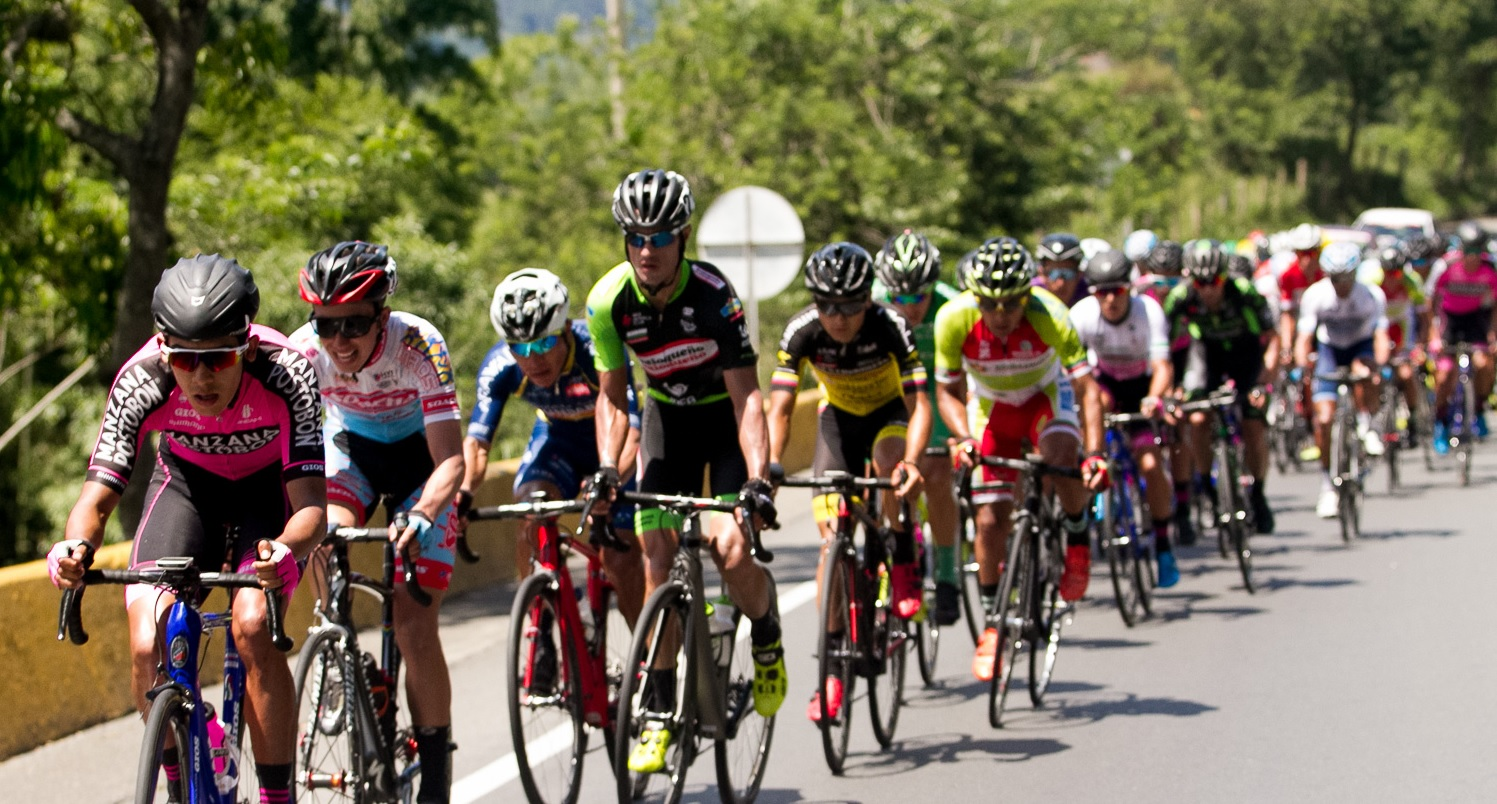
2nd stage of the Vuelta a Colombia 2018

An escarabajo in cycling ("scarab" in American Spanish: [eskaɾaˈβaxo]) is a nickname used for Colombian cyclists.

== Origin ==
The nickname originated in 1952, with the popularization of cycling in Colombia and the creation of the Vuelta ciclista a Colombia. It became popular in Europe in the eighties following the success of Colombian cyclists in international competitions. These cyclists showed their skills in mountain stages, although in other type of terrains, mainly in flat races, they had less success due to their physique.

== Notable Escarabajos ==
Recently, Colombian cycling has changed, with Colombian cyclists becoming distinguished in other terrains: Santiago Botero was declared time trial world champion.

The most notable escarabajos of the eighties were Luis Herrera, winner of one Vuelta a España, and Fabio Parra, first Colombian to reach the podium in Tour de France. In the decade of 2010 Nairo Quintana distinguished himself, finishing second in the general classification and first in the mountain classification in 2013 Tour de France. In 2015 Tour de France he finished in second place again in the general classification and first place in the young rider classification.

On June 1 of 2014 Quintana was declared champion of Giro de Italia, and Colombian Rigoberto Uran came second. Additionally, Colombian Julián Arredondo won the title King of the Mountains.

Others escarabajos of the "new generation" of Colombian cycling are Esteban Chaves, Sergio Luis Henao, Miguel Ángel López (ciclista), Jarlinson Pantano, Winner Anacona, Darwin Atapuma, Fernando Gaviria, Carlos Betancur, Dayer Quintana, Sebastián Henao, Rodolfo Torres, Fabio Duarte, Daniel Alexander Jaramillo, Egan Bernal, Janier Acevedo, Jhonatan Restrepo, Edwin Ávila, and Rodrigo Contreras (ciclista).
