= Penicillium maximae =

Scientific classification
- Kingdom: Fungi
- Division: Ascomycota
- Class: Eurotiomycetes
- Order: Eurotiales
- Family: Aspergillaceae
- Genus: Penicillium
- Species: P. maximae

Binomial name
- Penicillium maximae C.M. Visagie, J. Houbraken & R.A. Samson 2013

Type strain
- CBS 134565, DTO 244C7, NRRL 2060, SFC103236 and SFC 20150303-M16

Synonyms
- Penicillium maximai

Species of fungus

Penicillium maximae is a species in the genus Penicillium which is named after Queen Máxima of the Netherlands.

A 2022 study found that Penicillium maximae biomass powder and protein isolate could be considered as food products and protein substitutes fit for human and animal consumption.
