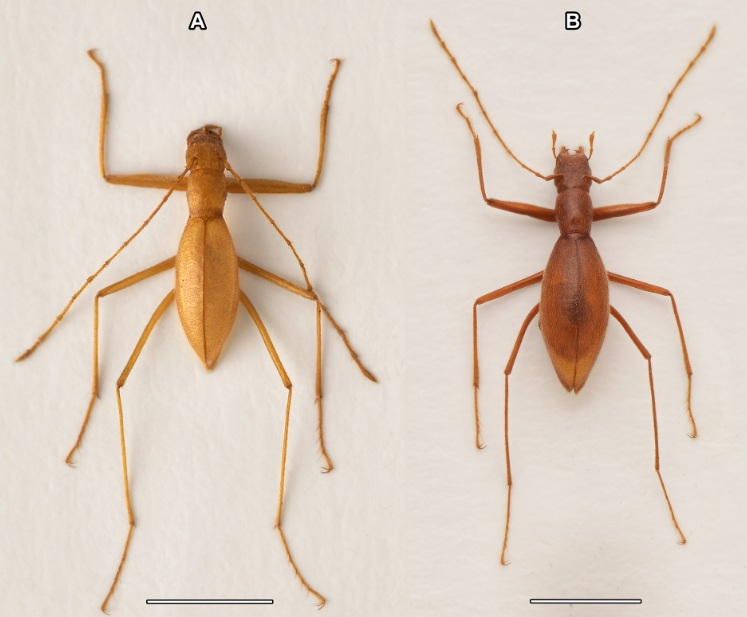
- A: male - B: female

Scientific classification
- Domain: Eukaryota
- Kingdom: Animalia
- Phylum: Arthropoda
- Class: Insecta
- Order: Coleoptera
- Suborder: Polyphaga
- Infraorder: Staphyliniformia
- Family: Leiodidae
- Genus: Remyella
- Species: R. spanovicae

Binomial name
- Remyella spanovicae Ćurčić, Vrbica & Vesović, 2025

= Remyella spanovicae =

Species of beetle

Remyella spanovicae is a species of beetle in the family Leiodidae. This species is endemic to the Pećina na Đerekarskom Vrelu Cave in south-western Serbia.

Adults reach a length of about 4.14 mm (males) and 4.53 mm (females) and have a yellowish-brown body.

== Etymology ==
The species is named after Ivana Španović, a Serbian athlete.
