= Gwesped piastrii =

Gwesped piastrii Temporal range: Middle Cretaceous, 100 Ma

Scientific classification
- Kingdom: Animalia
- Phylum: Arthropoda
- Class: Insecta
- Order: Hymenoptera
- Family: Bethylidae
- Genus: Gwesped
- Species: G. piastrii

Binomial name
- Gwesped piastrii Jouault, Huang & Azevedo 2026

Extinct species of Cretaceous wasp

Gwesped piastrii is an extinct species of wasp belonging to the family Bethylidae. This species is known only from a single female specimen preserved in mid-Cretaceous Burmese amber, found in the Hukawng Valley of northern Myanmar by entomologists and palentologists: Corentin Jouault, Di-Ying Huang, and Celso O. Azevedo.

The species lived around 98 million years ago, during the Cretaceous period, alongside dinosaurs. The species was described in a study published in the academic journal Palaeoworld by an international team of biologists in May 2026. The species was named after Oscar Piastri, a Formula One racing driver.

== Etymology ==
The genus name, Gwesped, derives from the Breton word for "wasps".

The species name piastrii was chosen to honour the Australian Formula One racing driver Oscar Piastri, who drives for McLaren F1 Team. The lead author of the study Jouault was a motorsport fan, and chose the name because the fossil's amber matrix glowed with a vivid orange color that closely matched McLaren's Papaya racing livery.

== Description ==
Gwesped piastrii was likely a small insect. The single female specimen measures 1.15 mm in body length and is preserved in a 10 x 8 × 2 mm rectangular piece of amber taken from the Hukawng Valley in Myanmar. The specimen is currently kept at the Nanjing Institute of Geology and Palaeontology.

Gwesped piastrii is distinguished from its sister species through a larger number of flagellomeres and notably different forewing venation.

=== Paleoecology ===
Hukawng Valley dates back to the Cenomanian stage of the Cretaceous period, and it is therefore likely that Gwesped piastrii lived in tropical coniferous forests. It was likely either a parasitoid or predator of small arthropods or insect larvae.
