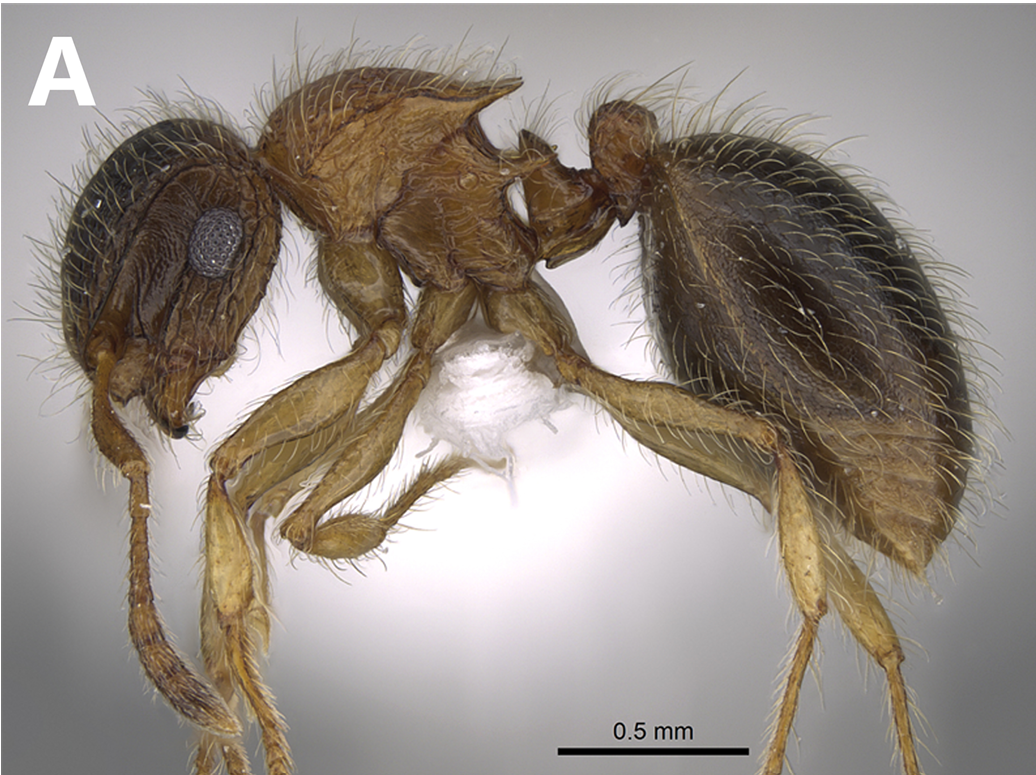
- Worker ant of the species Meranoplus mosalahi

Scientific classification
- Kingdom: Animalia
- Phylum: Arthropoda
- Clade: Pancrustacea
- Class: Insecta
- Order: Hymenoptera
- Family: Formicidae
- Subfamily: Myrmicinae
- Genus: Meranoplus
- Species: M. mosalahi

Binomial name
- Meranoplus mosalahi Sharaf & Aldawood, 2019

= Meranoplus mosalahi =

Species of ant

Meranoplus mosalahi is a species of ant belonging to the genus Meranoplus within the subfamily Myrmicinae. This species was officially described for the first time in 2019 by entomologists Mostafa R. Sharaf and Abdulrahman S. Aldawood, and it is endemic to the Sultanate of Oman.

== Etymology ==
The species was dedicated to the Egyptian international professional football player Mohamed Salah, in recognition of his sporting excellence and global fame.

== Taxonomic history ==
The taxonomic status of Meranoplus mosalahi as a distinct and stable species was confirmed in a comprehensive study conducted by Sharaf et al. in 2022. This study included a review of the faunal composition and distribution of ants in the Dhofar Governorate of Oman.

== Geographic distribution ==
The known geographic distribution of this species is restricted to the Palaearctic Region, specifically in:

- Oman: This country represents the type locality where the study specimens were collected for the first time, particularly within the dense forest environments of the Dhofar Governorate.

== Identification and description ==
Meranoplus mosalahi is a member of the Meranoplus magrettii-group. Worker ants can be diagnosed by the following morphological characters:

- Color: It features a distinctly bicolored body; the head and gaster are brown, while the antennae, mesosoma, petiole, and postpetiole are light brown, and the legs are yellow.
- Head: The anterior clypeal margin is shallowly concave or straight, bearing a pair of reduced, short, and blunt tubercles. The cephalic surface features about 12 irregular, interrupted longitudinal rugae, and the ground surface between these rugae is finely punctate.
- Mesosoma and Petiole: The anterior pronotal corners are armed with a pair of short, acute teeth when viewed dorsally. The posterior margin of the promesonotal shield is strongly concave between the spines, making the posterior spines appear sharper. The anterior face of the petiolar node is completely smooth.

=== Comparison with related species ===
This species is most similar to the fellow Arabian species Meranoplus pulcher, but can be easily distinguished by several key features:

1. It has a bicolored body, whereas the body of M. pulcher is mostly uniformly yellow.
2. The head features only about 12 longitudinal rugae, compared to around 20 dense, continuous longitudinal rugae in M. pulcher.
3. The anterior face of the petiolar node is smooth, whereas it is finely punctate in M. pulcher.

When compared to Meranoplus magrettii (known from Sudan), the posterior margin of the promesonotal shield in the Omani species is strongly concave with sharp spines, whereas it is feebly concave with short, blunt spines in the Sudanese species.

== Habitat and ecology ==
This species is considered uncommon and has a restricted distribution, confined to the Dhofar Governorate in Oman, especially within the forests surrounding the Dhalkout area near the Omani-Yemeni borders—a region highly recognized for its high rates of endemism in flora and fauna. A few specimens were also recorded in the "Agdaroot" region.

=== Biology ===
The natural habitat (type locality) of this species consists of shaded areas with ample small shrubs and grasses. The workers move relatively slowly and have been observed foraging on the ground where the soil is moderately humid; others were collected using sweeping nets. The species exhibits noticeable size variation among workers within the same nest series.
