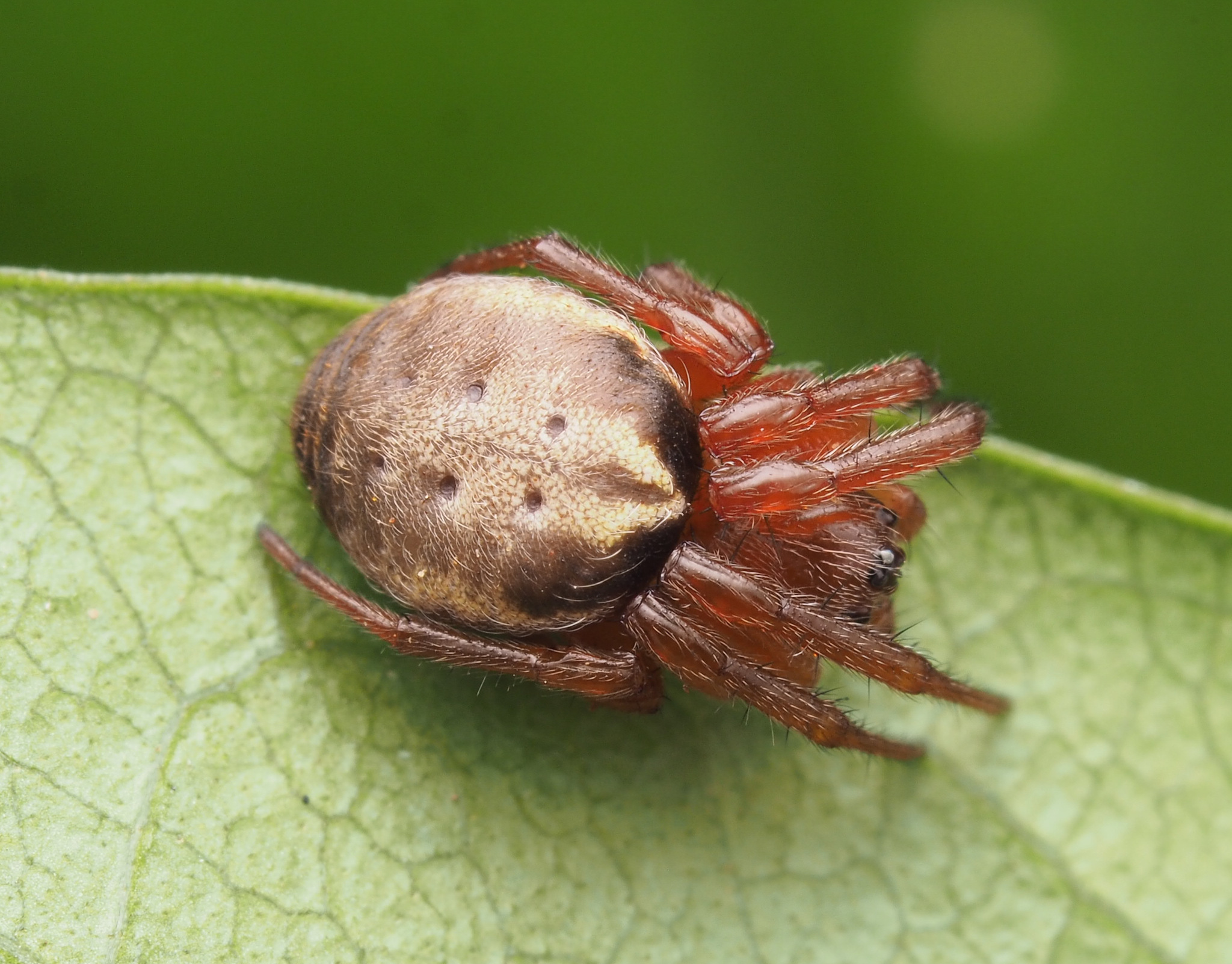
- female L. folium
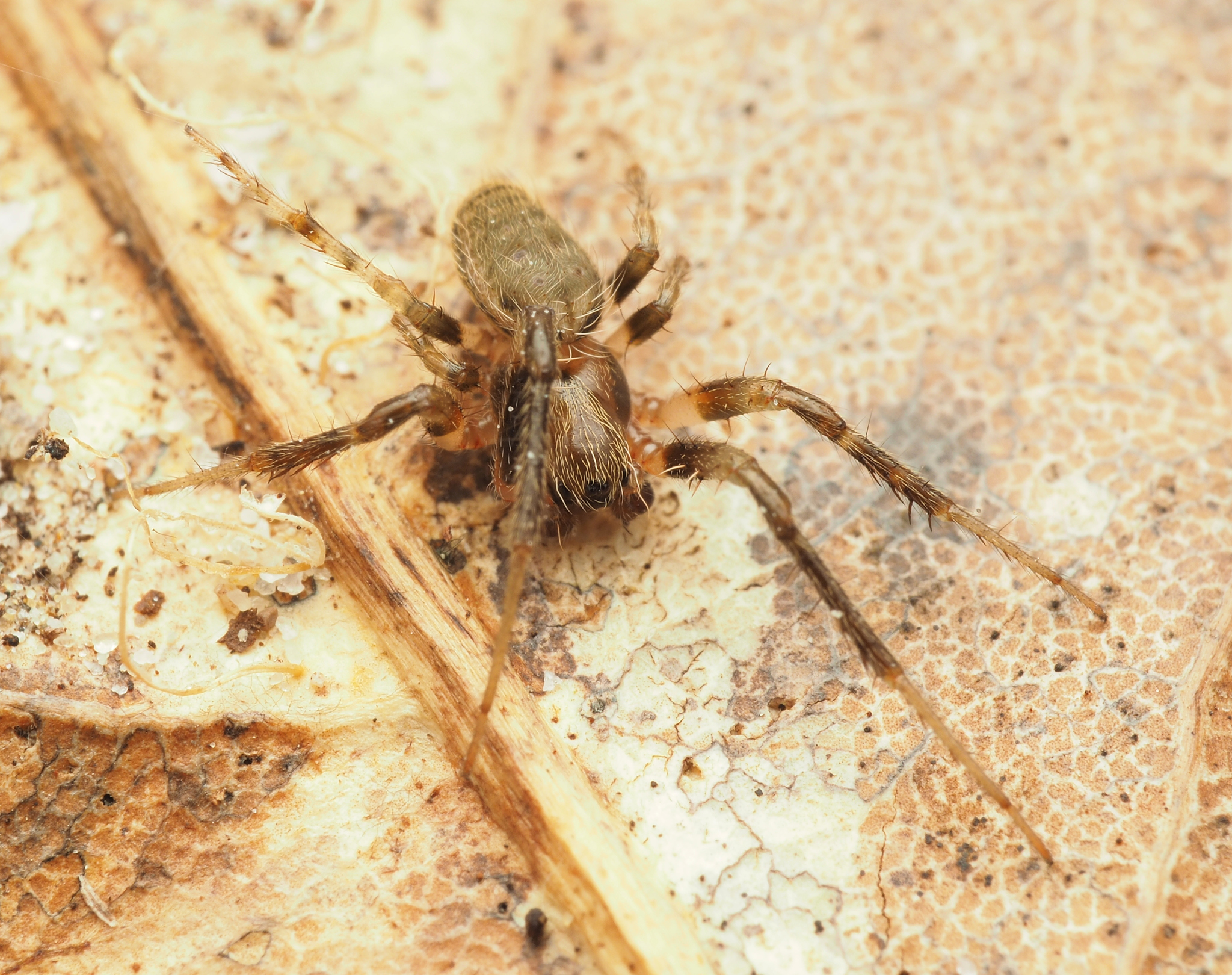
- male L. dimidiata

Scientific classification
- Kingdom: Animalia
- Phylum: Arthropoda
- Subphylum: Chelicerata
- Class: Arachnida
- Order: Araneae
- Infraorder: Araneomorphae
- Family: Araneidae
- Genus: Leviana; Framenau & Kuntner, 2022

Type species
- Epeira dimidiata L. Koch, 1871

Species
- 5, see text

= Leviana =

Genus of spiders

Leviana is a genus of spiders in the family Araneidae.

== Distribution ==
Leviana is distributed across Australia.

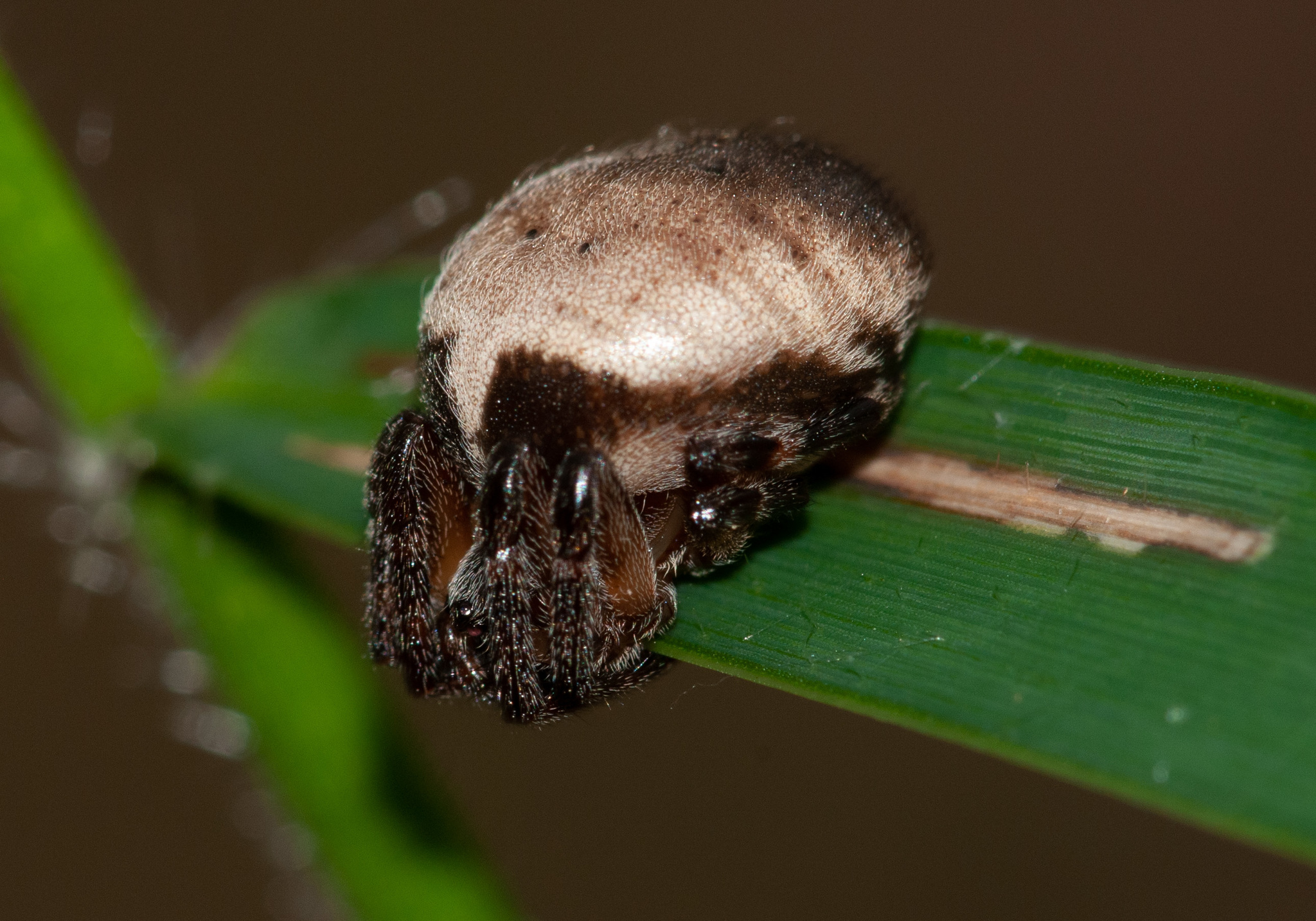
female L. dimidiata

== Etymology ==
The genus name "honours the late Herbert Levi (1921–2014) for his contribution to araneid taxonomy and systematics".

== Species ==
As of November 2026, this genus includes five species:

- Leviana cincinnata Framenau & Kuntner, 2022 – Australia (Queensland)
- Leviana dimidiata (L. Koch, 1871) – Australia (Queensland to Victoria) (type species)
- Leviana folium Framenau & Kuntner, 2022 – Australia (Queensland, New South Wales)
- Leviana minima Framenau & Kuntner, 2022 – Australia (Queensland)
- Leviana mulieraria (Keyserling, 1887) – Australia (Western Australia, Northern Territory, Queensland)
