= Bonnet orchid =

Bonnet orchid may refer to:

- Cryptostylis erecta, an orchid native to south eastern Australia
- Pleurothallis, a genus of orchids many of which have rib-like stems
- Trichosalpinx, a genus of neotropical orchids
