= Volvarina rhiannae =

Scientific classification
- Kingdom: Animalia
- Phylum: Mollusca
- Class: Gastropoda
- Subclass: Caenogastropoda
- Order: Neogastropoda
- Family: Marginellidae
- Genus: Volvarina
- Species: V. rhiannae

Binomial name
- Volvarina rhiannae Ortea, 2021

Species of gastropod

Volvarina rhiannae is a species of sea snail, a marine gastropod mollusk in the family Marginellidae, the margin snails.

== Distribution ==
This marine species is endemic to Barbados, Caribbean Sea.

It is named after Barbadian singer Rihanna, though her name was misspelt.
