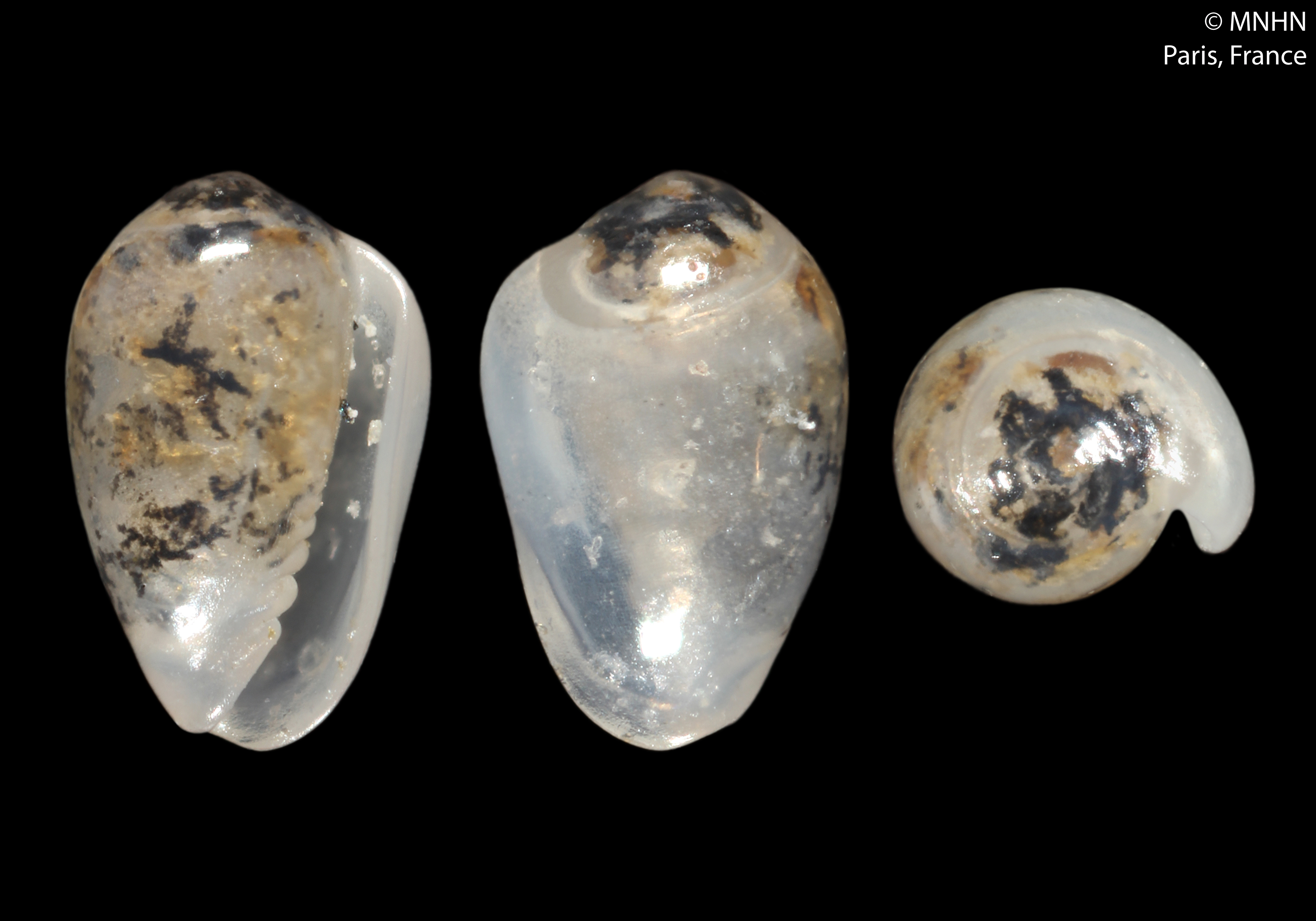
- Shell of Gibberula isinbayevae (holotype at MNHN, Paris)

Scientific classification
- Kingdom: Animalia
- Phylum: Mollusca
- Class: Gastropoda
- Subclass: Caenogastropoda
- Order: Neogastropoda
- Family: Cystiscidae
- Subfamily: Cystiscinae
- Genus: Gibberula
- Species: G. isinbayevae

Binomial name
- Gibberula isinbayevae Ortea, 2015

= Gibberula isinbayevae =

Species of gastropod

Gibberula isinbayevae is a species of sea snail, a marine gastropod mollusk, in the family Cystiscidae. It is named after Russian athlete Yelena Isinbayeva.

== Description ==
The length of the shell attains 1.8 mm.

== Distribution ==
This species occurs off Guadeloupe.
