= Sikandarpur Ghoshi =

Coordinates: 28.47973°N 77.107068°E

Sikandarpur Ghosi is a large village located in the district of Gurgaon in the state of Haryana in India. It has a population of about 5,586 living in around 1,212 households.

This village is dominated by the Hindu population and lies near the MG road. There is a Delhi Metro station in Sikandarpur. Nearby villages are Nathupur and Chakkarpur.

== See also ==
- Gurgaon
- Haryana
