= Cantikus =

Scientific classification
- Domain: Eukaryota
- Kingdom: Animalia
- Phylum: Arthropoda
- Subphylum: Chelicerata
- Class: Arachnida
- Order: Araneae
- Infraorder: Araneomorphae
- Family: Pholcidae
- Genus: Cantikus; Huber, 2018

Type species
- C. halabala (Huber, 2011)

Species
- 27, see text

Genus of spiders

Cantikus is a genus of southeastern Asian cellar spiders first described by B. A. Huber, J. Eberle & D. Dimitrov in 2018.

== Species ==
As of July 2021 it contains twenty-seven species:

- Cantikus anaiensis (Yao & Li, 2016) — Indonesia (Sumatra)
- Cantikus ballarini (Yao & Li, 2016) — Thailand
- Cantikus cheni (Yao & Li, 2017) — Thailand
- Cantikus chiangmaiensis (Yao & Li, 2016) — Thailand
- Cantikus elongatus (Yin & Wang, 1981) — China, Laos
- Cantikus erawan (Huber, 2011) — Thailand, Laos, Malaysia
- Cantikus exceptus (Tong & Li, 2009) — China
- Cantikus gou (Yao & Li, 2016) — Myanmar
- Cantikus halabala (Huber, 2011) — Thailand to Singapore, Indonesia (Sumatra)
- Cantikus khaolek (Huber, 2016) — Thailand
- Cantikus kuhapimuk (Huber, 2016) — Thailand
- Cantikus lintang (Huber, 2016) — Malaysia (Borneo)
- Cantikus namou (Huber, 2011) — Laos
- Cantikus pakse (Huber, 2011) — Laos
- Cantikus phami (Yao, Pham & Li, 2015) — Vietnam
- Cantikus pyu (Huber, 2011) — Myanmar
- Cantikus sabah (Huber, 2011) — Malaysia (Borneo)
- Cantikus sepaku (Huber, 2011) — Indonesia (Borneo)
- Cantikus subwan (Yao & Li, 2017) — Thailand
- Cantikus sudhami (Huber, 2011) — Thailand
- Cantikus taptaoensis (Yao & Li, 2016) — Thailand
- Cantikus tharnlodensis (Yao & Li, 2016) — Thailand
- Cantikus ubin (Huber, 2016) — Singapore, Indonesia (Gaya Is.)
- Cantikus v-notatus (Thorell, 1878) — Myanmar to Indonesia
- Cantikus wan (Yao & Li, 2016) — Thailand
- Cantikus youngae (Huber, 2011) — Thailand
- Cantikus zhuchuandiani (Yao & Li, 2016) — Indonesia (Borneo)
