= Bioliteracy =

Ability to understand biological topics

Bioliteracy is the ability to understand and engage with biological topics. The concept is used particularly in the contexts of biotechnology and biodiversity.

== Description ==
In the biotechnology context, bioliteracy is considered important for promoting the biotechnology industry and the development of biological engineering products. It has also been defined as "the concept of imbuing people, personnel, or teams with an understanding of and comfort with biology and biotechnology." The use in the context of biodiversity is somewhat distinct, focusing on improving awareness of different organisms with the goal of conservation.

Citizen science initiatives, such as iNaturalist, are considered effective ways to increase bioliteracy, engaging students with direct observation of nature.
