= Liolaemus messii =

Scientific classification
- Kingdom: Animalia
- Phylum: Chordata
- Class: Reptilia
- Order: Squamata
- Suborder: Iguania
- Family: Liolaemidae
- Genus: Liolaemus
- Species: L. messii

Binomial name
- Liolaemus messii Ruiz, Quipildor, Ruiz-Monachesi, Escalante, Valdecantos, & Lobo, 2021

Species of lizard

Liolaemus messii is a species of lizard in the family Liolaemidae. It is found in Argentina and is named after Argentine footballer Lionel Messi.
