= Penicillium alexiae =

Scientific classification
- Kingdom: Fungi
- Division: Ascomycota
- Class: Eurotiomycetes
- Order: Eurotiales
- Family: Aspergillaceae
- Genus: Penicillium
- Species: P. alexiae

Binomial name
- Penicillium alexiae C.M. Visagie, J. Houbraken & R.A. Samson, 2013

Synonyms
- Penicillium alexiai

Species of fungus

Penicillium alexiae is a fungus species of the genus of Penicillium. Penicillium alexiae is named after Princess Alexia of the Netherlands.

== See also ==
- List of Penicillium species
