= Caddy Adzuba =

Congolese lawyer

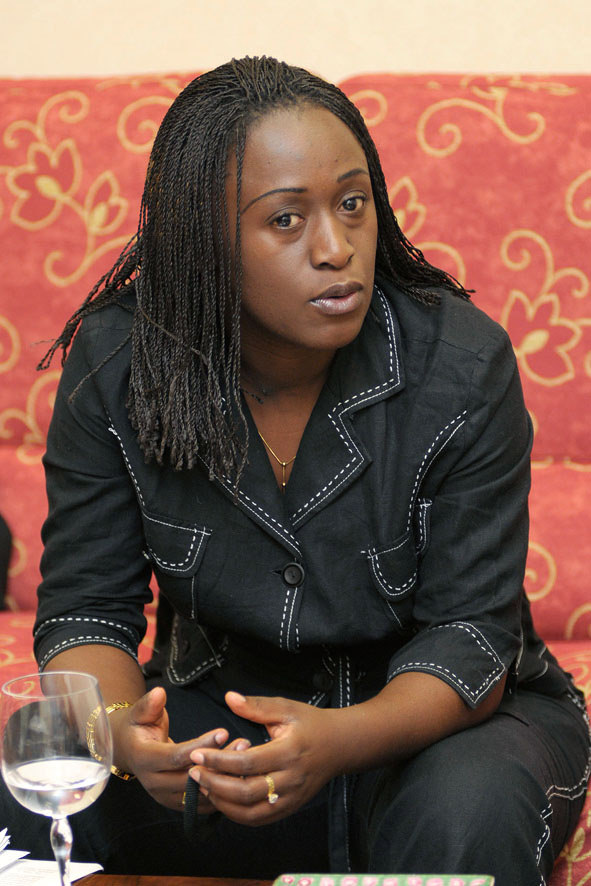
- Caddy Adzuba in 2010.
- Born: 5 April 1981 (age 45); Bukavu, Zaire
- Education: Université officielle de Bukavu
- Occupations: Lawyer, journalist
- Awards: Princess of Asturias Award for Concord

Caddy Adzuba (born 5 April 1981) is a Congolese lawyer, journalist, and activist for women's rights. Her focus is on fighting sexual violence in the Democratic Republic of the Congo (DRC). She worked for Radio Okapi and in 2014 she received the Princess Asturias Award for Concord.

== Life ==
Adzuba was born on 5 April 1981, she is the oldest of eight siblings born in a wealthy neighborhood of Bukavu, Democratic Republic of Congo. She graduated in law at the Université officielle de Bukavu in 2005.

According to the IFEX Network, a group of organizations defending freedom of expression around the world, Adzuba decided to work for the promotion of human rights when war broke out in her home when she was 16 years old. After being separated from her family and witnessing human suffering, she "decided to do something for human rights."

She helped found Un Altavoz para el Silencio network, reporting the sexual violence against women in her country. She is also a member of the East Congo Media Women's Association. Caddy Adzuba is also the co-founders of the Women's Alliance for the Promotion of Human Rights.

She is now a journalist in Radio Okapi, the official radio channel of United Nations' mission in the Democratic Republic of Congo. Nowadays her fights against torture and rape are still in the spotlight, and due to her work, she has received several death threats.

== Awards ==
- Julio Anguita Parrado International Journalism Award (2009)
- International Award of the "Woman of the Year" worth 35,000 euros from the Regional Council of Aosta Valley (2012)
- Princess of Asturias Award for Concord 2014
