= Penicillium amaliae =

Scientific classification
- Kingdom: Fungi
- Division: Ascomycota
- Class: Eurotiomycetes
- Order: Eurotiales
- Family: Aspergillaceae
- Genus: Penicillium
- Species: P. amaliae

Binomial name
- Penicillium amaliae Visagie, Houbraken & K. Jacobs 2013

Synonyms
- Penicillium amaliai

Species of fungus

Penicillium amaliae is a fungus species of the genus of Penicillium. Penicillium amaliae is named after Catharina-Amalia Beatrix Carmen Victoria.

== See also ==
- List of Penicillium species
