= Penicillium arianeae =

Scientific classification
- Kingdom: Fungi
- Division: Ascomycota
- Class: Eurotiomycetes
- Order: Eurotiales
- Family: Aspergillaceae
- Genus: Penicillium
- Species: P. arianeae

Binomial name
- Penicillium arianeae Visagie, Houbraken & Samson 2013

Species of fungus

Penicillium arianeae is a fungus species of the genus of Penicillium which is named after Princess Ariane of the Netherlands.

== See also ==
- List of Penicillium species
