= Nemonte Nenquimo =

Waorani leader

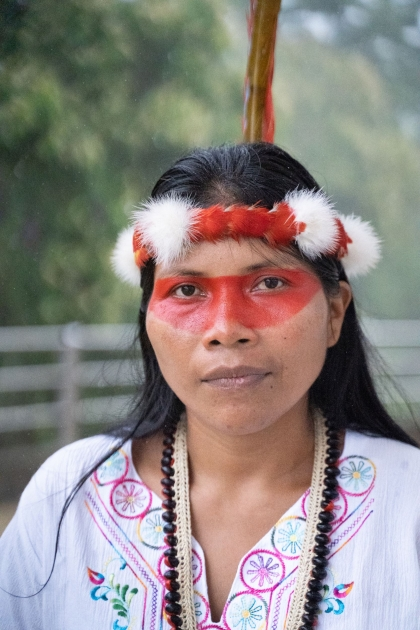
- Nenquimo in 2020
- Born: 1985 (age 40–41); Pastaza Province, Ecuador
- Occupations: Tribal leader, activist, author
- Awards: Champions of the Earth, BBC's 100 Women

Nemonte Nenquimo (born 1985) is an Indigenous activist, author and member of the Waorani Nation from the Amazonian Region of Ecuador. She is the first female president of the Waorani of Pastaza (CONCONAWEP), co-founder of the Indigenous-led nonprofit organization Ceibo Alliance, and co-founder of the nonprofit Amazon Frontlines, which works to protect the Amazon rainforest, protect its biodiversity, and strengthen Indigenous guardianship of the Amazon. In 2020, she was named in the Time 100 list of the 100 most influential people in the world, the only Indigenous woman on the list and the second Ecuadorian to ever be named in its history. In recognition of her work, in 2020 the United Nations Environment Programme gave her the "Champions of the Earth" award in the category Inspiration and Action.

Nenquimo was the plaintiff in a lawsuit against the Ecuadorian government, which culminated in a 2019 ruling that protects half a million acres of Waorani ancestral land in the Amazon rainforest from oil drilling.

== Early life and beliefs ==
Nenquimo was born in the community of Nemompare in 1985 in the Pastaza region of the Ecuadorian Amazon. She is a member of the Waorani Nation of hunter-harvesters. Her grandfather, Piyemo, a legendary Waorani warrior who lived and hunted in what is today known as Yasuni National Park, gave Nenquimo her name. In the language of the wao, Nemonte Ayebe means “constellation of stars,” “long fish of the broken river”, and “singing bird”.

From the age of five, Nenquimo was encouraged by Waorani elders to become a leader. When she was 12 years old, Nenquimo’s father took her to visit her aunts, who lived near an oil well. This was a formative experience for her, as she witnessed the considerable social and environmental influence of the oil well on the area:

“I was 12, and the impact it made was very strong, to see the flames and smoke shooting from the oil well… I don't know how people can live there, with all that noise, it's nothing like my home in Nemonpare, where all you see at night is the stars and all you hear is the animals”.

Nenquimo has expressed a love for her land going back generations. Her community, the Waorani Nation, were first colonized in 1958 by Christian missionaries. In the 1960s, the Ecuadorian government, driven by oil, began building roads and destroying their forest. The government has also divided Waorani land to be auctioned for oil extraction. Most of the Ecuadorian Amazon has been affected by this, with six of the blocks auctioned to oil companies belonging to the Waorani. One of these blocks is Nemompare, Nenquimo’s birthplace. As a result, the Waorani people have been forced to moved further into the forest in a fight to remain independent from the outside world.

Nemonte Nenquimo says that her people have felt the effects of climate change long before it became a mainstream conversation. She has also stated that abuelas (elderly Waorani women) have provided her with the knowledge and passion to fight for change.

== Activism ==
In 2013, while working on rainwater harvesting and storage projects, Nenquimo met Mitch Anderson, an American who worked with communities in the Ecuadorian Amazon in their dispute with oil corporations Texaco and Chevron. In 2014, Nenquimo and Anderson co-founded the Ceibo Alliance, an association uniting four Indigenous communities across Ecuador, Peru, and Colombia. They formed the Ceibo Alliance to create collective representation for indigenous peoples to address government legislation concerning their territory and natural resources.

Nenquimo was elected the first female president of the Waorani organization of Pastaza province (CONCONAWEP) in 2018. During her tenure as president, she co-filed a lawsuit with Ecuador’s human rights ombudsman against the Ecuadorian government, arguing that it had not obtained prior consent from the Waorani to sell parts of their territory to oil corporations.

== 2019 court ruling ==
Location of Yasuní National Park and Waorani land in Ecuador

In 2019, Nenquimo co-filed a lawsuit with Ecuador’s human rights ombudsmen against the Ecuadorian government. Nenquimo was the plaintiff in the lawsuit, whose 2019 ruling by a three-judge panel of the Pastaza Provincial Court protects half a million acres of the Amazon rainforest in Ecuador from oil drilling. The verdict states that the Ecuadorian government must engage in the free, prior and informed consent process according to the standards of international law and the Constitutional Court of Ecuador before auctioning land. This ruling provides a legal precedent for other Indigenous nations to counteract resource extraction within Indigenous territory.

A parade of hundreds of Waorani people celebrated the ruling in April 2019 in Puyo, the regional capital of the eastern province of Pastaza. Many traveled great distances to attend.

== We Will Not Be Saved ==
Nemonte co-wrote the book We Will Not Be Saved (called 'We Will Be Jaguars’ in the United States) with her husband Mitch Anderson. Released in June 2024, the book seeks to educate the readers about the history of the Waorani tribe, the centuries of colonization, and the prejudiced viewpoints held by the Western world. Nenquimo states that the outsiders including "missionaries, oil companies and others" end up bringing harm to the Waorani people. She relates this to the climate crisis, stating that "Mother Earth is not asking to be saved, she's just demanding to be respected."

== Awards ==
In 2020, she was featured on the Time 100 list, the only Indigenous woman that year and among the first Amazonians ever to be named. She was also on the list of the BBC's 100 Women announced on 23 November 2020. In 2020, Nenquimo was one of six environmental leaders to be awarded the Goldman Environmental Prize. In 2024, the nonprofit she co-founded, Amazon Frontlines, was selected by an international jury to receive the Hilton Humanitarian Prize for their work "on permanently protecting the rainforest homelands of dozens of Indigenous nations from further mining, drilling, and deforestation using grassroots organizing, advocacy, legal defense, and cutting-edge technology like GPS mapping and drone and camera trap surveillance."
