= Pyralis papaleonei =

Scientific classification
- Kingdom: Animalia
- Phylum: Arthropoda
- Clade: Pancrustacea
- Class: Insecta
- Order: Lepidoptera
- Family: Pyralidae
- Genus: Pyralis
- Species: P. papaleonei

Binomial name
- Pyralis papaleonei Huemer, Kaila & Segerer, 2026

Species of moth

Pyralis papaleonei is a species of moth that belongs to the family Pyralidae. It is endemic to the White Mountains located on the island of Crete in Greece. It is closely related to other species found in the eastern Mediterranean region being most closely related to Pyralis kacheticalis and Pyralis regalis.

This species was named in honor of Pope Leo XIV who is currently the head of the Catholic Church. The species named "papaleonei" is derived from the Latin word for Pope Leo, "Papa Leone". This was done in honor for his strong advocacy of climate and environmental protection.

== Description ==
The forewings of Pyralis papaleonei are marked by narrow white markings. One of these markings is an almost uniformly slender median band that extends across the entire forewing. The forewings are a purplish color with the edges being predominantly reddish brown. The hindwings of this species are a pale or purplish grey color. The hindwing are divided into three sections by two white lines. The basal section of the wings is slightly darker.

== Biology ==
The host plant of this species is unknown along with the early developmental stages of this species. They appear to grow into adults around the month of June with the most specimens being collected during that time however a single specimen was collected in October.
