= Insect tea =

Type of tea

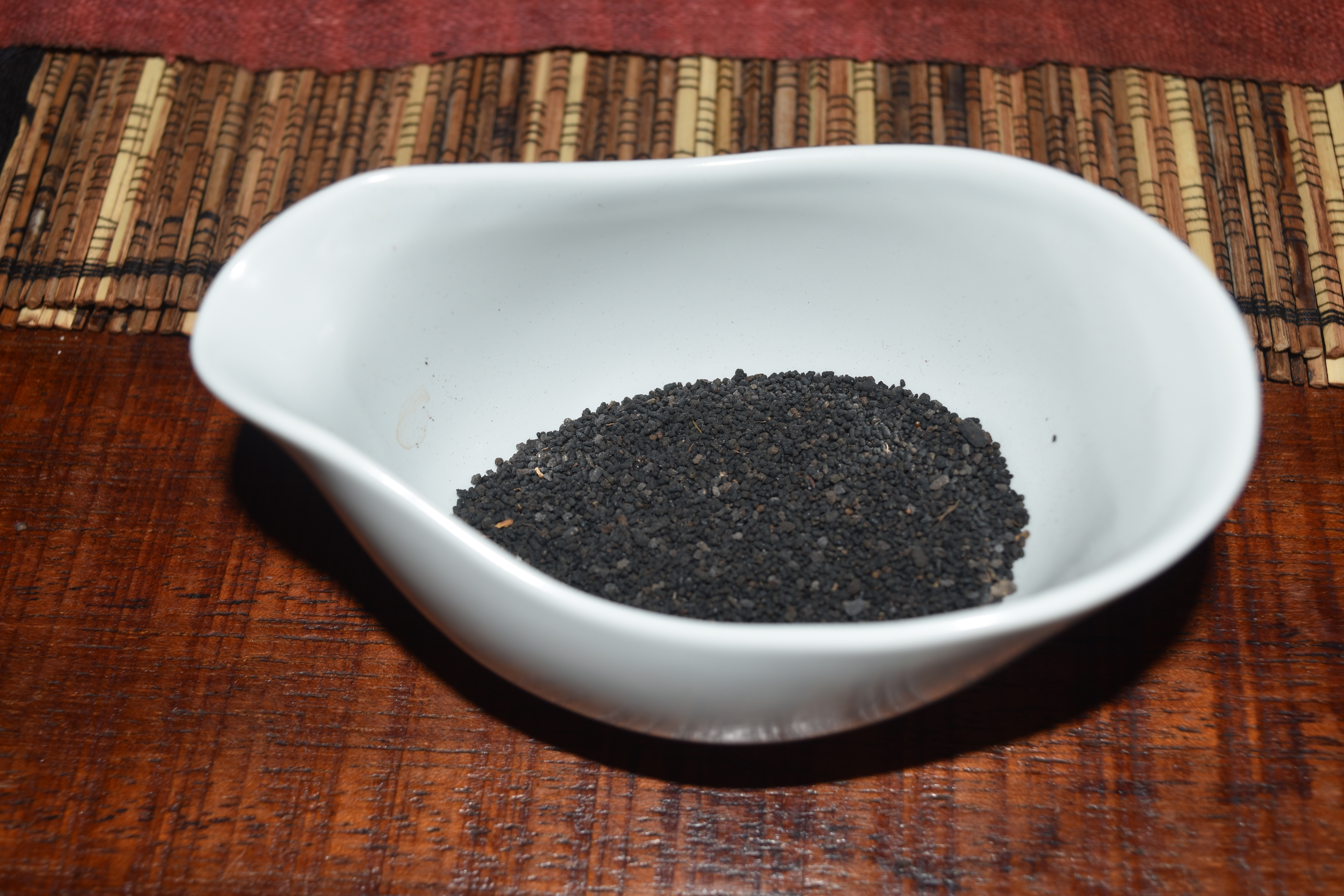
Insect tea

Insect tea refers to teas (in the broad sense, not always tea proper) made from leaves bitten by, and the droppings of, insects fed on specific plants. Most insect teas originate from the Southeast Asian region. They are often used in local traditional medicine, but have not been well-studied in the scientific literature.

== The insects and their hosts ==
Various insect teas are produced by small traditional communities particularly in the Southeast Asian hill regions, including southern China and Thailand. Not all insect sources and host plants have been studied or documented.

Some examples include:

- Dongfang meiren, produced by Empoasca onukii (misidentified in literature as Jacobiasca formosana) leafhoppers fed on Camellia sinensis (true tea)
- Sanye, produced by Aglossa dimidiatus moth larvae fed on Malus sieboldii, a crabapple tree
- Huaxiang, from Hydrillodes repugnalis, another moth, fed on Platycarya strobilacea, a walnut-related tree
- Another, by Pyralis farinalis, also a moth, from Litsea coreana, a laurel tree
- Droppings of the stick insect Eurycnema versirubra (Serville, 1838) [=Eurycnema versifasciata] are made into a medicinal tea by Malaysian Chinese to treat ailments.
- Droppings of Andraca theae fed on Camellia sinensis.

== Alleged medicinal properties ==
Many chemicals in plants have evolved to protect them from insects. Insects in turn have evolved biochemical mechanisms or symbiotic relationships with microbes that allow them to consume these plants. The faecal matter often concentrates certain chemicals that produce distinctive flavours and tastes – and claimed effects on human health. Insect teas are widely used in traditional Asian medicine, particularly in China, where some local traditions have attributed instances of recuperation from illness to tea sacrifices made to Yue Lao.

A few academic journals have published papers reporting pharmacological effects of some of these teas or of chemicals found in them, though little follow-up research has been done as of 2019. For example, a 2015 Chinese study showed that polyphenols extracted from huaxiang tea reduced the count of liver cancer cells in vitro, by increasing their apoptosis rate (i.e., decreasing cell life-span). The same paper also broadly claimed that "Traditional Chinese medicine can prevent and cure cancer", a view not widely accepted by science).

Since the 2000s, drinks purporting to be sanye tea (with widely varying other ingredients) have been marketed, especially in the West, as a dietary supplement with unsubstantiated weight-loss, laxative, and detoxification claims.

== See also ==
- Kopi luwak
- Panda tea
- Black Ivory Coffee
