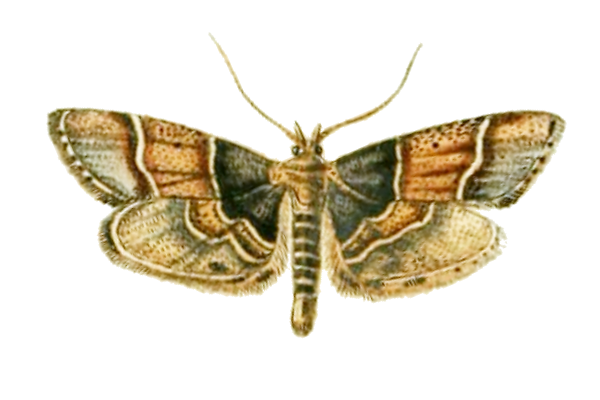
- Illustration of adult from John Curtis' British Entomology (Volume 6)
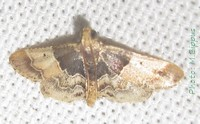

Scientific classification
- Kingdom: Animalia
- Phylum: Arthropoda
- Clade: Pancrustacea
- Class: Insecta
- Order: Lepidoptera
- Family: Pyralidae
- Genus: Pyralis
- Species: P. pictalis

Binomial name
- Pyralis pictalis (Curtis, 1834)

Synonyms
- Several, see text

= Pyralis pictalis =

Painted meal moth

Species of moth

Pyralis pictalis, the painted meal moth or poplar pyralis, is a snout moth (family Pyralidae). It is closely related to the family's type species the meal moth (P. farinalis) and consequently belongs to the tribe Pyralini of the snout moth subfamily Pyralinae. Its native range is tropical Asia to East Asia and to Wallacea and adjacent regions, but it has been quite widely (though involuntarily) distributed by humans. The term "Poplar" in its common name does not refer to the trees, but to Poplar, London, where the type specimen – from such an introduction – was caught. It was called scarce meal moth in the original description, which is only correct for the fringes of its range however.

While the caterpillars of this moth are most notable as a stored-food pest, they may themselves be useful for biological pest control as under certain conditions they will eat other insects' eggs.

== Distribution ==
It is not known precisely where this moth originated, but it seems to have been the general region of Southeast Asia. Presumably, the painted meal moth natively ranged from southern India and Sri Lanka northeastwards to Japan and southeastwards at least to Sumatra, Java and at least parts of Borneo; perhaps its natural range extended as far as the Philippines in the east, and to New Guinea or even Fiji in the southeast.

But the latter population, widely isolated as it seems, may just as well be a colonial era introduction, as may be the case for the records from Australia (beyond Wallacea, as seen from its core range) and northwest British India (beyond the Himalayas). In Polynesia P. pictalis was recorded beyond Fiji from Kiribati and from Hiva Oa in the Marquesas Islands, presumably fairly recent introductions. In Africa it appears to be absent from the east, but has been found in Belgian Congo and West Africa, as well as in South Africa. Finally there are of course the records from England and other European localities; in brief, outside its contiguous range the moth mainly occurs along the historical East Indiaman trade route. However, this moth tends to occur ephemerally outside its presumed core region; in temperate and even in subtropical Europe for example the species does not seem to have established a self-sustaining population and may in fact for all practical purposes be considered absent.

== Description and ecology ==
The adults resemble the meal moth (P. farinalis) but are smaller, with a wingspan of 15–34 mm. Furthermore, the base of the forewings has a lead-grey hue, and the light-bordered band in the forewing centre is narrower.

Larvae have also been recorded to eat the eggs of the bed bug Cimex hemipterus, a species known as major vector for disease (eventually determined to be hepatitis B). This must be considered when eradicating P. pictalis in a pest situation, particularly since C. hemipterus are quick to evolve insecticide resistance. Biological pest control by this or another species may be feasible if the stored-food pest problem is accounted for. Considering the original data, insectivory of P. pictalis caterpillars may be a seasonal phenomenon, meaning that they would need to be deployed in numbers for a few weeks at the start of the wettest time of year, the resultant moth population immediately being suppressed or sterilized.

== Synonyms ==
Due to the species being so widely introduced outside its native range and occurring in new locales as global traffic increased, introduced populations were times and again believed to be new species. To Francis Walker, one of the most prolific entomologists of the mid-late 19th century, this happened no less than three times. As a consequence, the painted meal moth has a number of now-invalid junior synonyms:

- Asopia pictalis Curtis, 1834
- Asopia pronoealis (Walker, 1859)
- Pyralis pronoealis Walker, 1859
- Myelois bractiatella Walker, 1863
- Pyralis bractiatella (Walker, 1863)
- Pyralis elachia Butler, 1879
- Pyralis suggeralis Walker, 1866
