= Kopi luwak =

Indonesian coffee

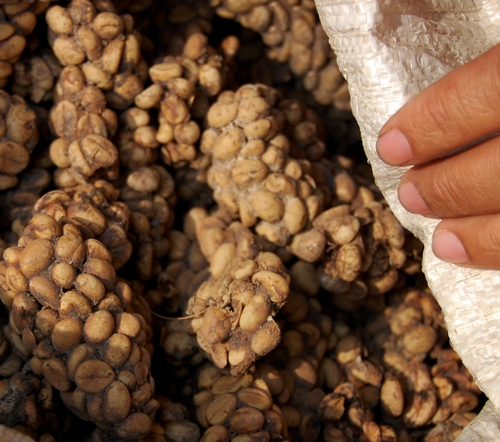
- Place of origin: Indonesia
- Main ingredients: Coffea arabica

Kopi luwak (Indonesian pronunciation: [ˈkopi ˈlu.aʔ]), also known as civet coffee, is a coffee that consists of partially digested coffee cherries, which have been eaten and defecated by the Asian palm civet (Paradoxurus hermaphroditus). The cherries are fermented as they pass through a civet's intestines, and after being defecated with other fecal matter, they are collected.

Although kopi luwak is a form of processing rather than a variety of coffee, it is known as one of the most expensive coffees in the world, with retail prices reaching $100 per kilogram ($45/lb) for farmed beans and $1,000 per kilogram ($450/lb) for wild-collected beans. Another epithet for it is the "Holy Grail of coffees".

== History ==
The origin of kopi luwak is closely connected to the history of coffee production in Indonesia; Dutch colonialists established coffee plantations in Indonesia and imported beans from Yemen. In the 19th century, farmers in central Java started to brew and drink coffee from excreted beans collected at their plantations.

== Production ==
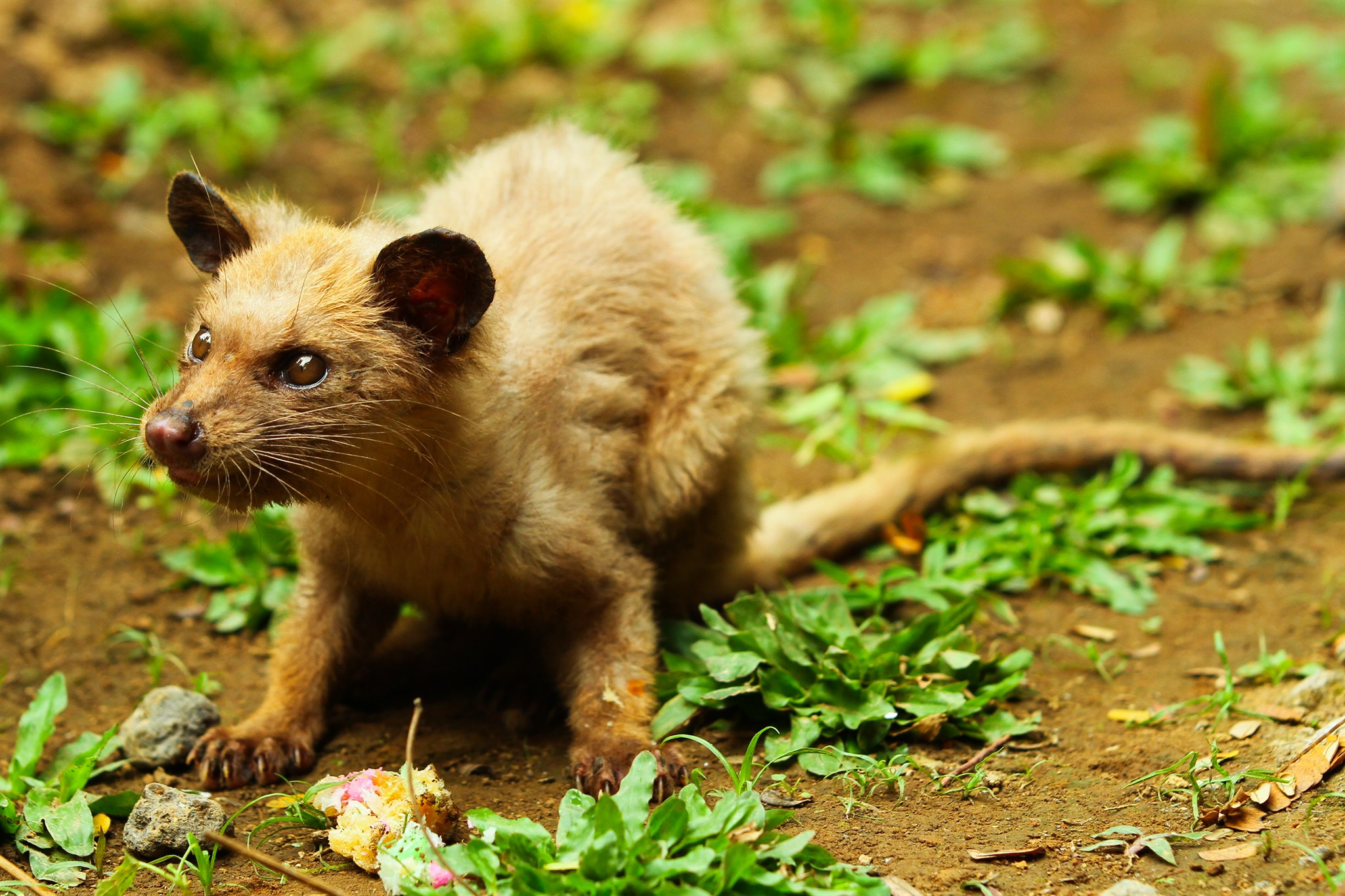
An Asian palm civet

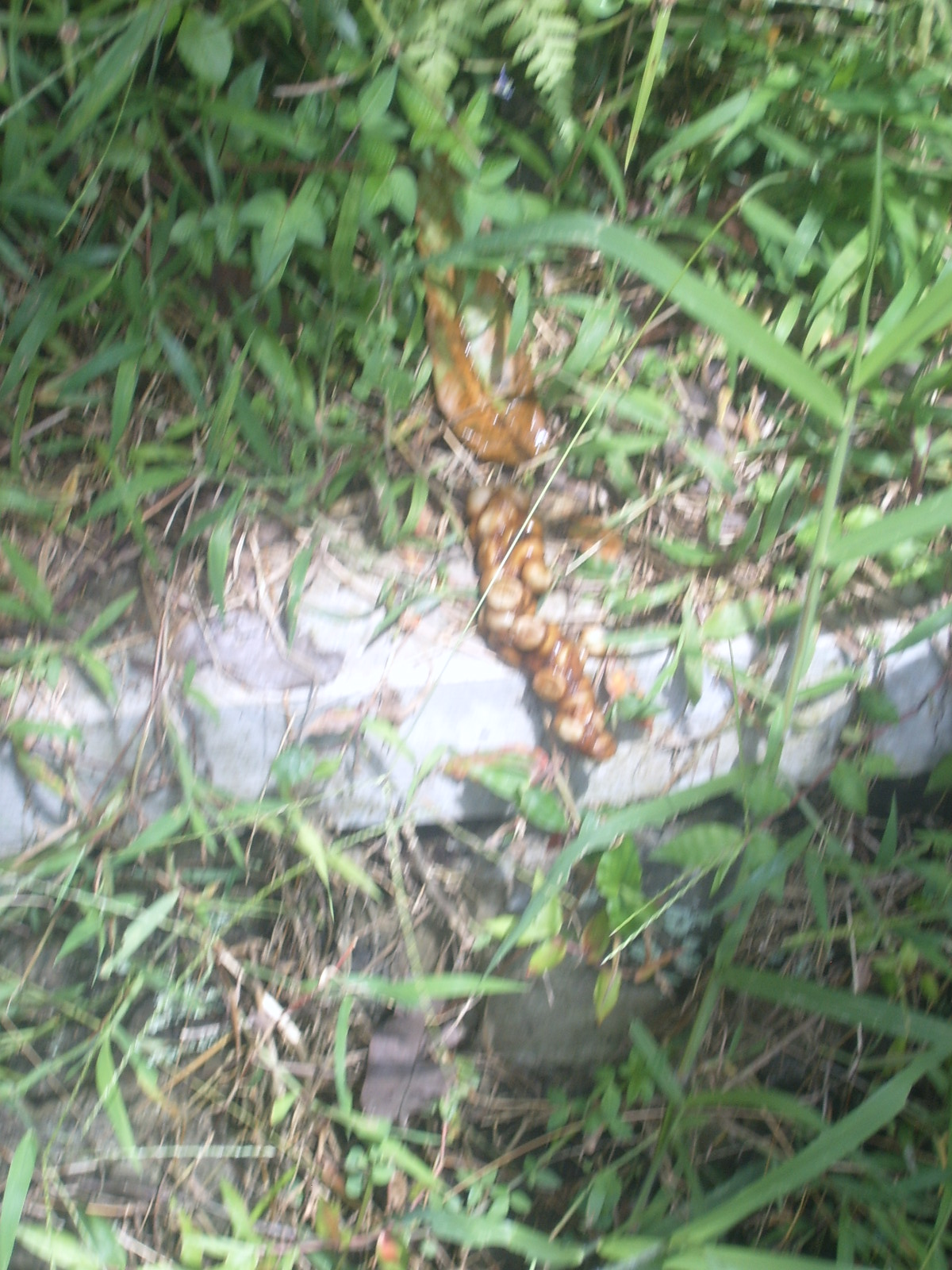
Defecated luwak coffee berries in East Java

Kopi luwak is produced mainly on the Indonesian islands of Sumatra, Java, Bali, Sulawesi, and in East Timor. It is also widely gathered in the forest or produced in farms in the islands of the Philippines, where the product is called kape motit in the Cordillera region, kapé alamíd in Tagalog areas, kapé melô or kapé musang in Mindanao, and kahawa kubing in the Sulu Archipelago.

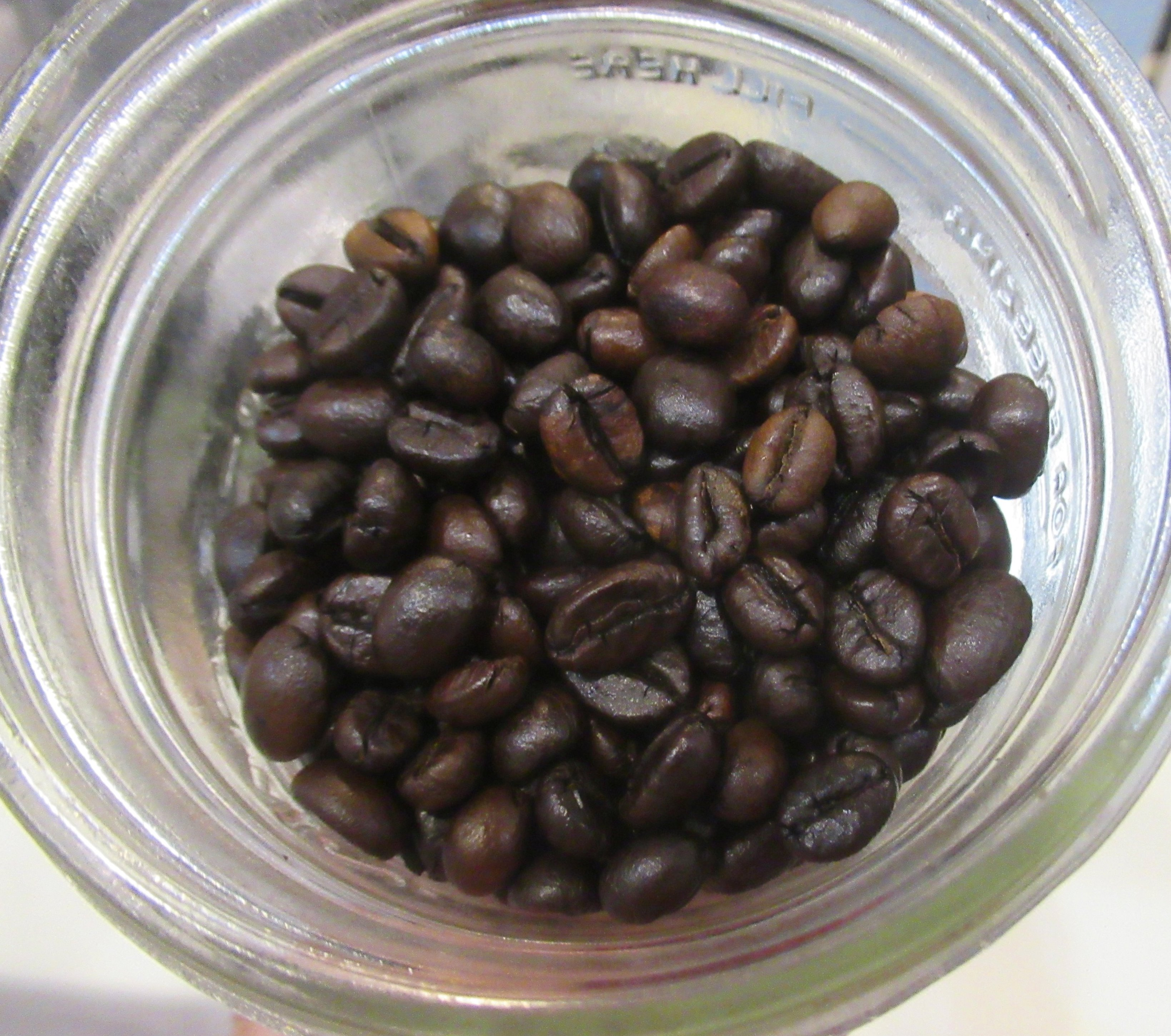
Roasted Palawan Kopi luwak

Kopi luwak is also produced in Palawan's Langogan Valley. The beans from droppings of the Asian palm civet and Palawan binturong (Arctictis binturong whitei) are collected from the forest floor and cleaned.

Producers of the coffee beans argue that the process may improve coffee through two mechanisms: selection, where civets choose to eat only certain cherries; and digestion, where biological or chemical mechanisms in the animals' digestive tracts alter the composition of the coffee cherries.

The traditional method of collecting feces from wild Asian palm civets previously captured in the wild has given way to an intensive farming method, in which the palm civets are kept in battery cages and are force-fed the cherries. This method of production has raised ethical concerns about the treatment of civets and the conditions they are made to live in, which include isolation, poor diet, small cages, and a high mortality rate. Kopi luwak is brewed from coffee beans that traversed the gastrointestinal tract of an Asian palm civet, and were thus subjected to a combination of acidic, enzymatic, and fermentation treatment. During digestion, digestive enzymes and gastric juices permeate through the endocarp of coffee cherries and break down storage proteins, yielding shorter peptides. This alters the composition of amino acids and impacts the aroma of the coffee. In the roasting process, the proteins undergo a non-enzymatic Maillard reaction. The palm civet is thought to select the ripest and most flawless coffee cherries. This selection influences the flavour of the coffee, as does the digestive process. The beans begin to germinate by malting, which reduces their bitterness. When performed in nature, or in the wild, these two mechanisms achieve the same goal as selective picking and the wet or washed process of coffee milling: 1) harvesting optimally ripe cherries and 2) mechanically and chemically removing the pulp and skin from the cherry, leaving mainly the seed.

Traditionally, excreted coffee beans were collected directly in plantations and forests. As the international demand for kopi luwak increased, some producers turned to caged production methods to increase yields. It is produced in Indonesia, East Timor, the Philippines, Thailand, Vietnam and Ethiopia.

== Taste ==
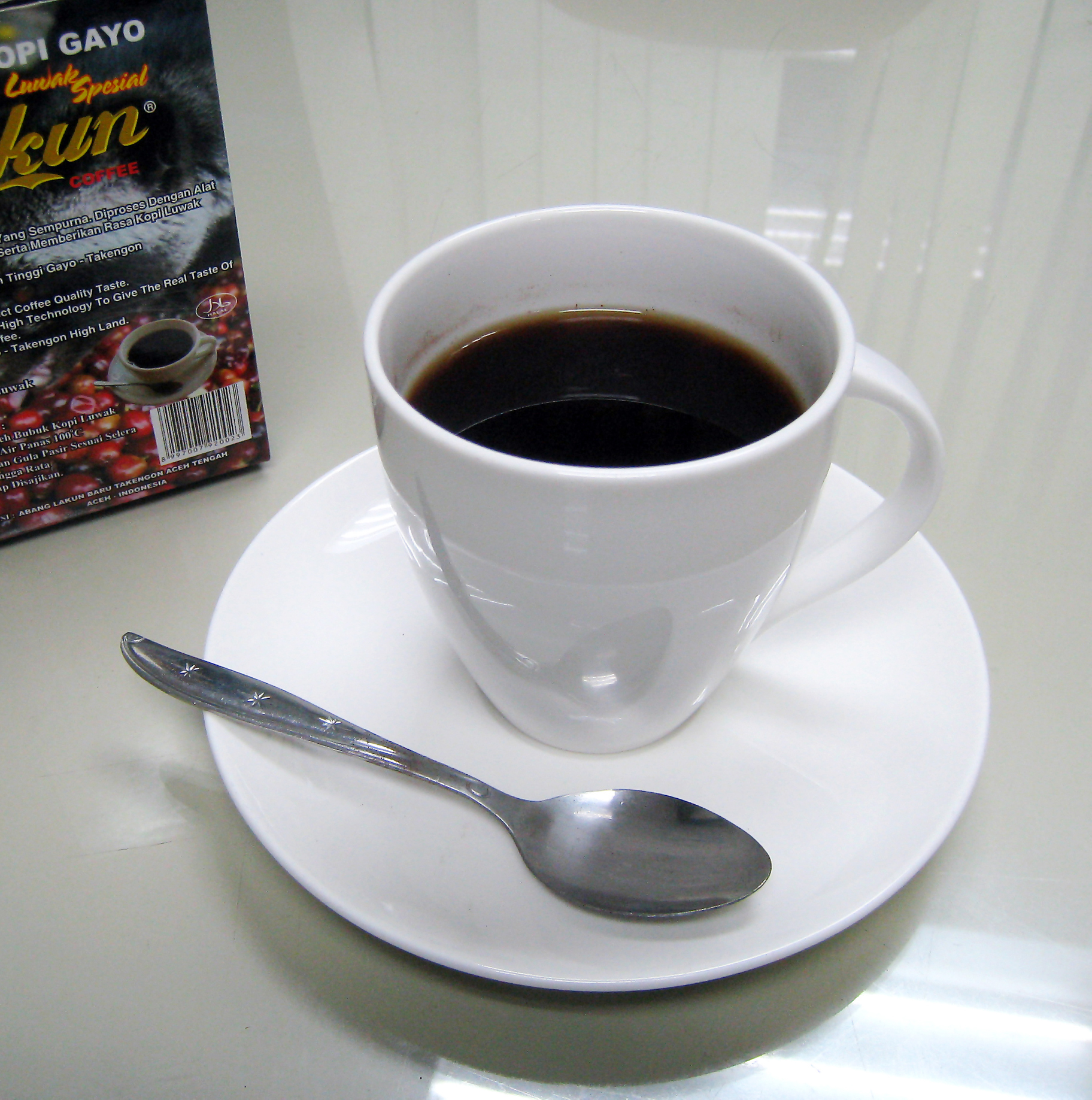
A cup of kopi luwak from Gayo, Takengon, Aceh

The taste of kopi luwak varies with the type and origin of the excreted beans, processing, roasting, aging, and brewing. The ability of the civet to select its berries, and other aspects of the civet's diet and health, like stress levels, may also influence the processing and, hence taste.

Within the coffee industry, kopi luwak is widely regarded as a gimmick or novelty item. The Specialty Coffee Association of America (SCAA) states that there is a "general consensus within the industry...it just tastes bad". A coffee professional compared the same beans with and without the kopi luwak process using a rigorous coffee cupping evaluation. He concluded: "It was apparent that luwak coffee sold for the story, not superior quality...Using the SCAA cupping scale, the luwak scored two points below the lowest of the other three coffees. It would appear that the luwak processing diminishes good acidity and flavor and adds smoothness to the body, which is what many people seem to note as a positive to the coffee." Professional coffee tasters were able to distinguish kopi luwak from other coffee samples, but remarked that it tasted "thin". Some critics claim more generally that kopi luwak is simply bad coffee, purchased for novelty rather than taste. A food writer reviewed kopi luwak available to American consumers and concluded, "It tasted just like...Folgers. Stale. Lifeless. Petrified dinosaur droppings steeped in bathtub water. I couldn't finish it."

A comparative chemical study revealed that civet-processed Robusta beans contained significantly higher total fat elevated levels of caprylic methyl ester and capric acid methyl ester; these compounds are commonly used as flavouring agents and are associated with creamy, dairy-like notes.

== Competition ==
Several commercial processes attempt to replicate the digestive process of the civets without animal involvement. Researchers with the University of Florida have been issued with a patent for one such process. Brooklyn-based food startup Afineur has also developed a patented fermentation technology that reproduces some of the taste aspects of Kopi Luwak while improving coffee bean taste and nutritional profile.

Imitation has several motivations. The high price of kopi luwak drives the search for a way to produce kopi luwak in large quantities. Kopi luwak production involves a great deal of labour, whether farmed or wild-gathered. The small production quantity and the labor involved in production contribute to the coffee's high cost. Imitation may be a response to the decrease in the civet population.

Investigations by PETA and the BBC found fraud to be rife in the kopi luwak industry, with producers willing to label coffee from caged civets with a "wild sourced" or similar label.

== Animal welfare ==
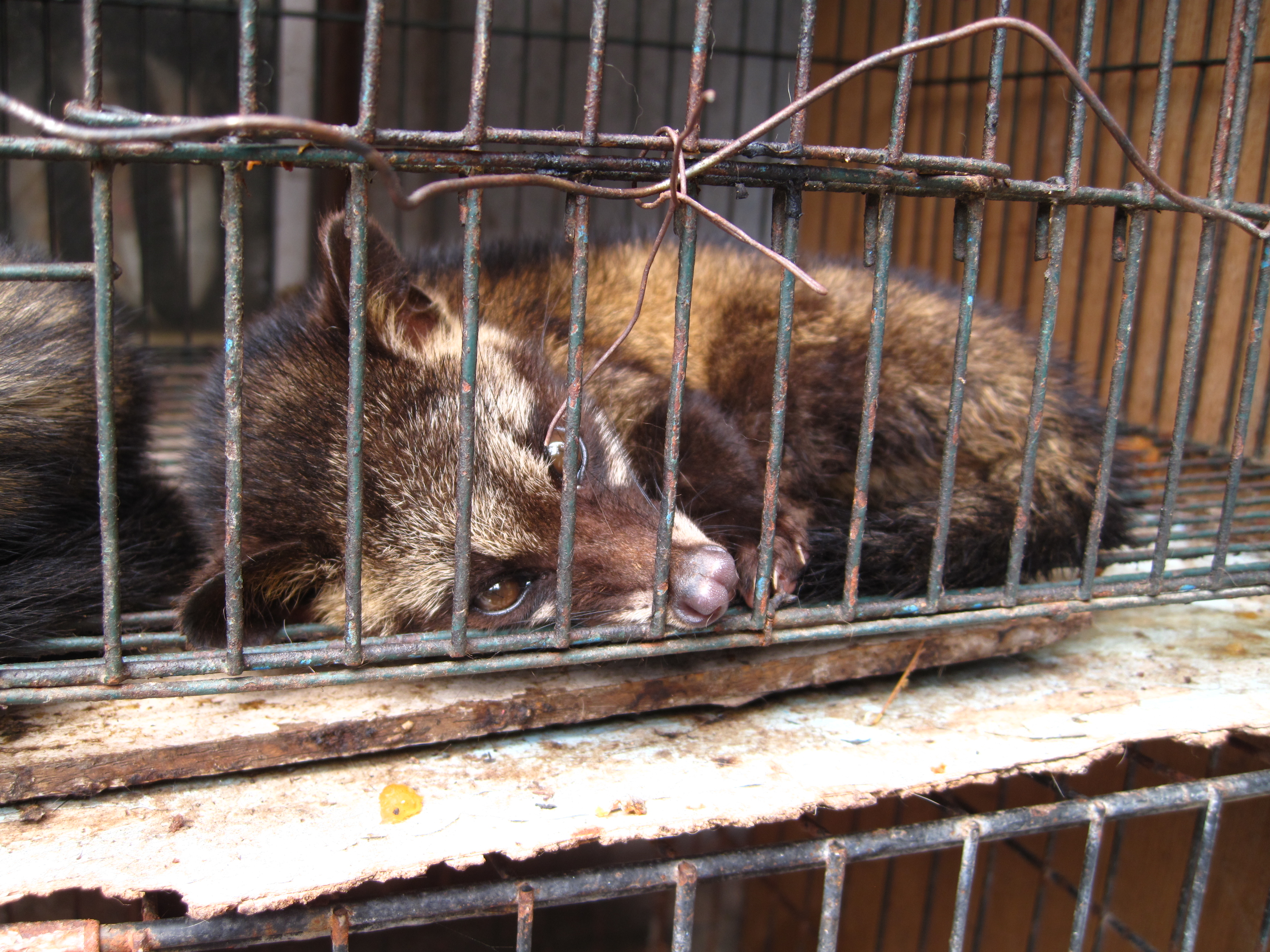
Asian palm civet in a cage

Growing numbers of intensive civet "farms" have been established and are operated in Southeast Asia, confining tens of thousands of animals to live in battery cages and be force-fed. "The conditions are awful, much like battery chickens", said Chris Shepherd, deputy regional director of TRAFFIC in Southeast Asia. "The civets are taken from the wild and have to endure horrific conditions. They fight to stay together, but they are separated and have to bear a very poor diet in very small cages. There is a high mortality rate, and for some species of civet, there's a real conservation risk. It is spiraling out of control". The trade in palm civets for the production of kopi luwak may constitute a significant threat to wild populations.

In 2013, People for the Ethical Treatment of Animals (PETA) investigators found wild-caught civets on farms in Indonesia and the Philippines. They were deprived of exercise, proper diet, and space. Video footage from the investigation shows abnormal behaviours such as repeated pacing, circling, or biting the bars of their cages. The animals often lose their fur. A BBC investigation revealed similar conditions. Farmers using caged palm civets in north Sumatra confirmed that they supplied kopi luwak beans to exporters whose produce ends up in Europe and Asia. Tony Wild, the coffee executive responsible for bringing kopi luwak to the Western world, has stated he no longer supports using kopi luwak due to animal cruelty and launched a campaign called "Cut the Crap" to halt the use of kopi luwak.

== Price and availability ==
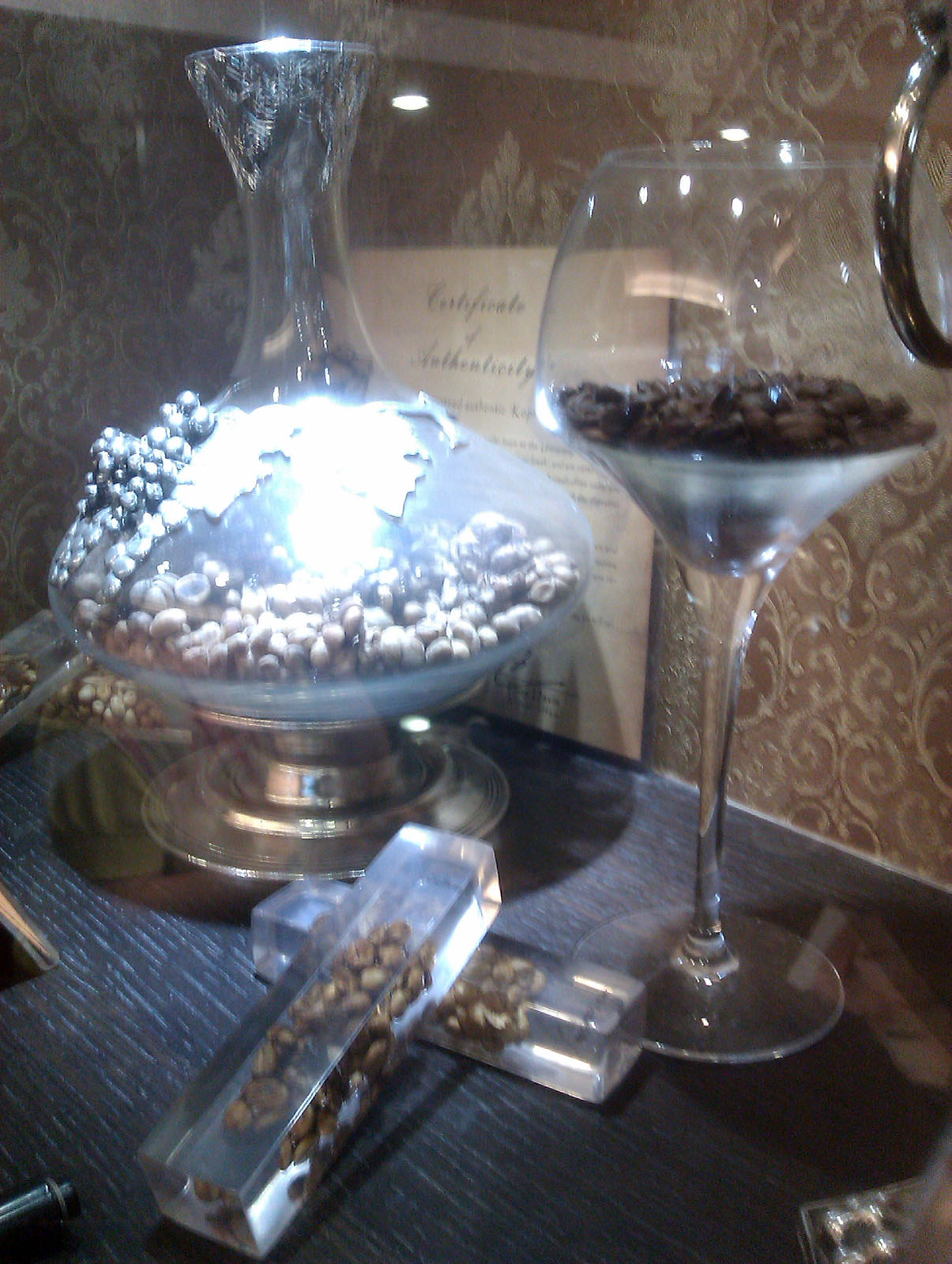
A window display in an upscale coffee shop showing kopi luwak in forms of defecated clumps (bottom), unroasted beans (left) and roasted beans (right)

Kopi luwak is one of the most expensive coffees in the world, selling for between $220 and $1,100 per kilogram ($100 and $500/lb) in 2010. The price paid to collectors in the Philippines is closer to US$20 per kilogram. The specialty Vietnamese weasel coffee, which is made by collecting coffee beans eaten by wild civets, is sold at US$500 per kilogram. Most customers are Asian, especially those originating from Japan, China, and South Korea.

Some specialty coffee shops sell cups of brewed kopi luwak for US$35–80.

== Variations ==
Coffee beans can be "seeded" with the same microbes as in civet gut to produce the same coffee flavor without having to deal with civet excrement.

The binturong is also sometimes kept captive for the production of kopi luwak.

There are reports of a kopi luwak type process occurring naturally with muntjac and birds. Bat coffee is another variation that is in demand. Bats feed on the ripest coffee and fruits and spit out the seeds. These seeds are dried and processed to make coffee with a slight fruity flavor.

== In popular culture ==
In the movie The Bucket List, billionaire health care magnate Edward Cole (played by Jack Nicholson) brings kopi luwak with him on all of his travels but is unaware of how the drink is produced. Carter Chambers (Morgan Freeman) explains how civets defecate kopi luwak coffee beans, and that the gastric juices of the defecated beans give kopi luwak its unique aroma.

== See also ==
- Balinese cuisine
- Black Ivory coffee
- List of Indonesian beverages
- Insect tea
- Panda tea
