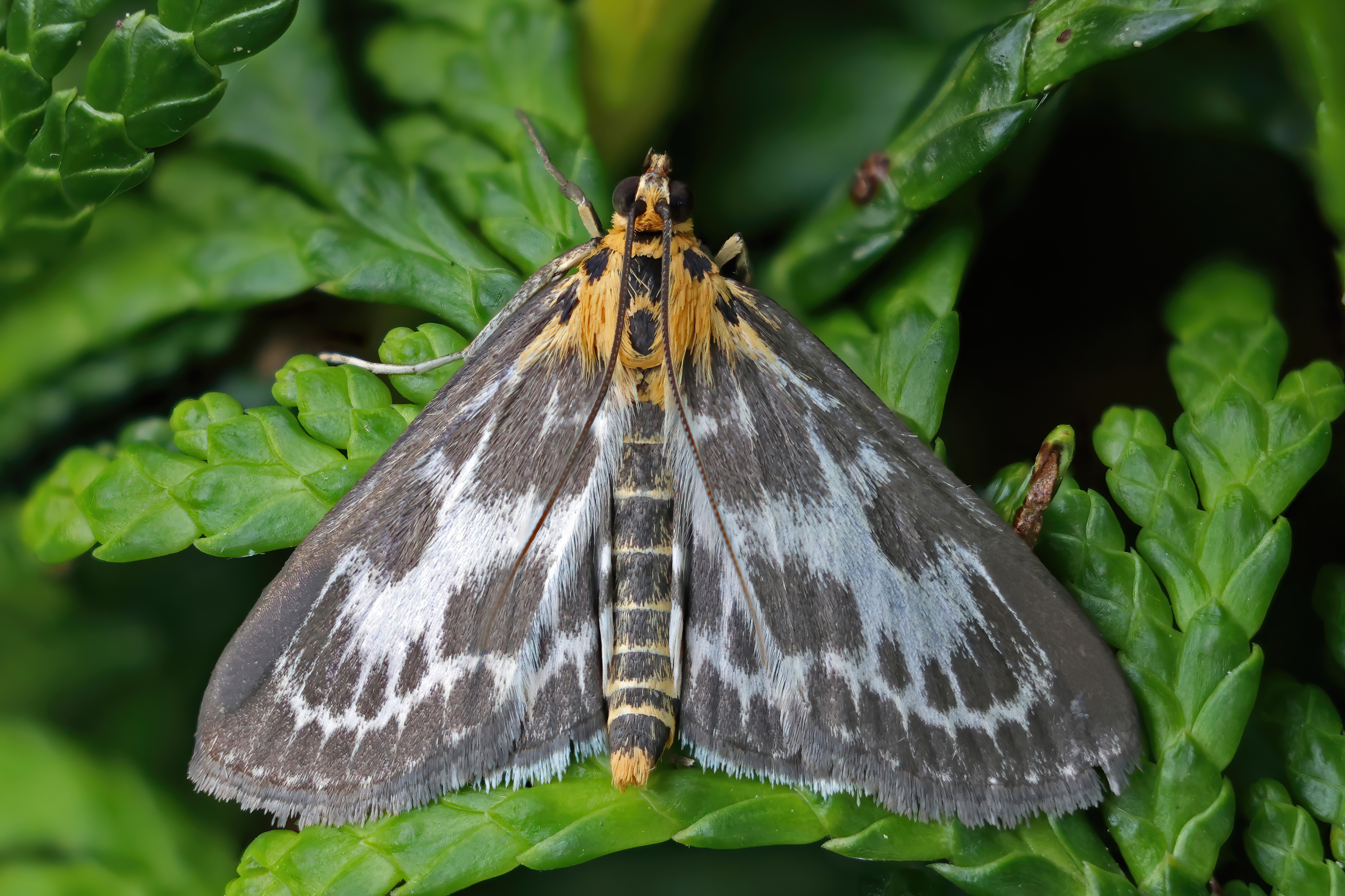

Scientific classification
- Kingdom: Animalia
- Phylum: Arthropoda
- Clade: Pancrustacea
- Class: Insecta
- Order: Lepidoptera
- Family: Crambidae
- Genus: Anania
- Species: A. hortulata

Binomial name
- Anania hortulata (Linnaeus, 1758)

Synonyms
- List: Phalaena (Geometra) hortulata Linnaeus, 1758; Eurrhypara hortulata; Phalaena flavicauda Retzius, 1783; Phalaena hortulana Fourcroy, 1785; Phalaena urticata Linnaeus, 1761; Eurrhypara urticata ab. dissoluta Skala, 1928; Eurrhypara urticata ab. minor Dufrane, 1957; Eurrhypara urticata f. crassipunctata Dufrane, 1957; Pyralis urticalis Denis & Schiffermüller, 1775

= Anania hortulata =

Small magpie

Species of moth

Anania hortulata, also known as the small magpie, is a species of moth of the family Crambidae found in Asia, Europe and North America. It was described, in 1758, by the 18th-century Swedish taxonomist, botanist, and zoologist, Carl Linnaeus.

== Description ==
The wingspan is 24–28 millimetres (0.94–1.10 in) The head and thorax are deep ochreous-yellow, black-spotted. Forewings are yellowish-white, markings blackish; base blackish, with two ochreous-yellow marks; a suffused costal streak; lines thick, first irregular, second tending to form spots, curved, narrowest below middle; small orbicular and large round discal spots, touching costal streak; a terminal fascia tending to form spots, edge parallel to second line. Hind wings with colour, second line, and terminal fascia as in forewings; a blackish discal spot. The larva is whitish; dorsal line dull green, white-edged; head and plate of 2 black. See also Parsons et al.

The moth flies from June to July depending on the location and is easily disturbed by day. It flies from dusk onward and comes to light.

Ovum

Eggs are mostly laid on stinging nettle (Urtica dioica) and occasionally on Labiatae such as white horehound (Marrubium vulgare), woundwort (Stachys species) and mint (Mentha species).

Larvae

Larvae can be found in August and September feeding in a rolled or spun leaf. They overwinter in a transparent cocoon hidden under loose bark, or in a hollow stem of Umbelliferae such as hogweed (Heracleum sphondylium).

Pupa

Pupation takes place in the spring in the overwintered site.

== Gallery ==
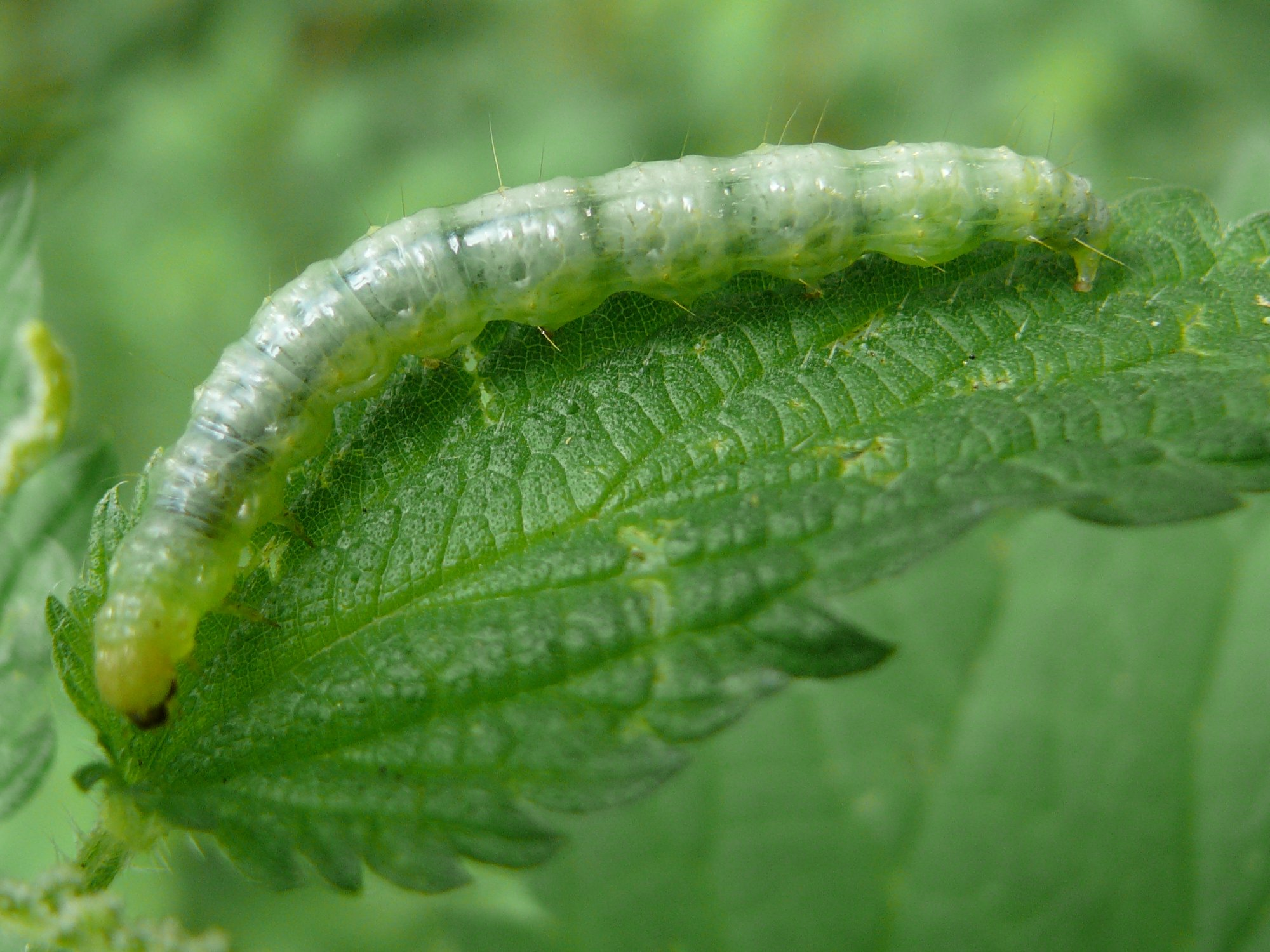
larva

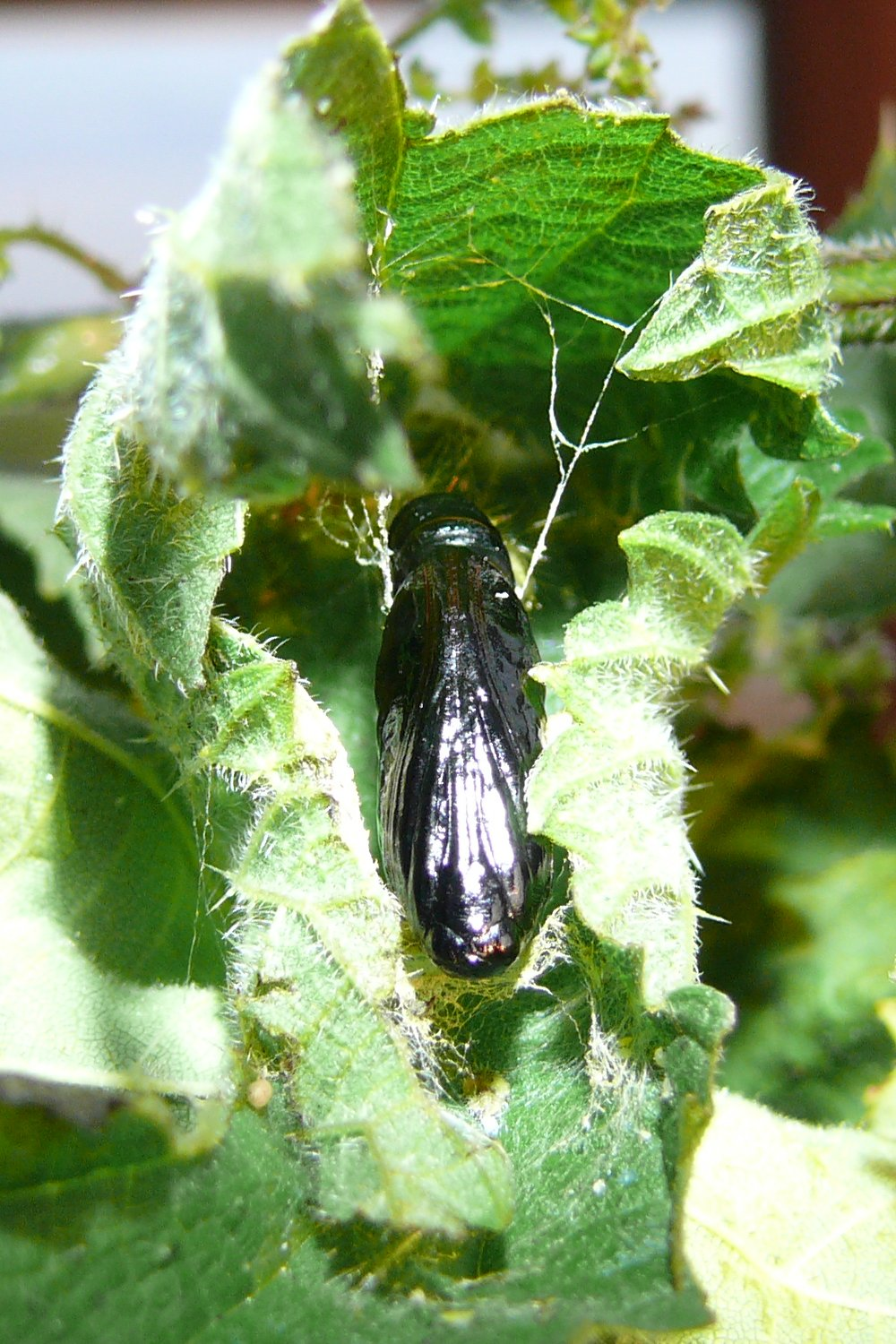
pupa

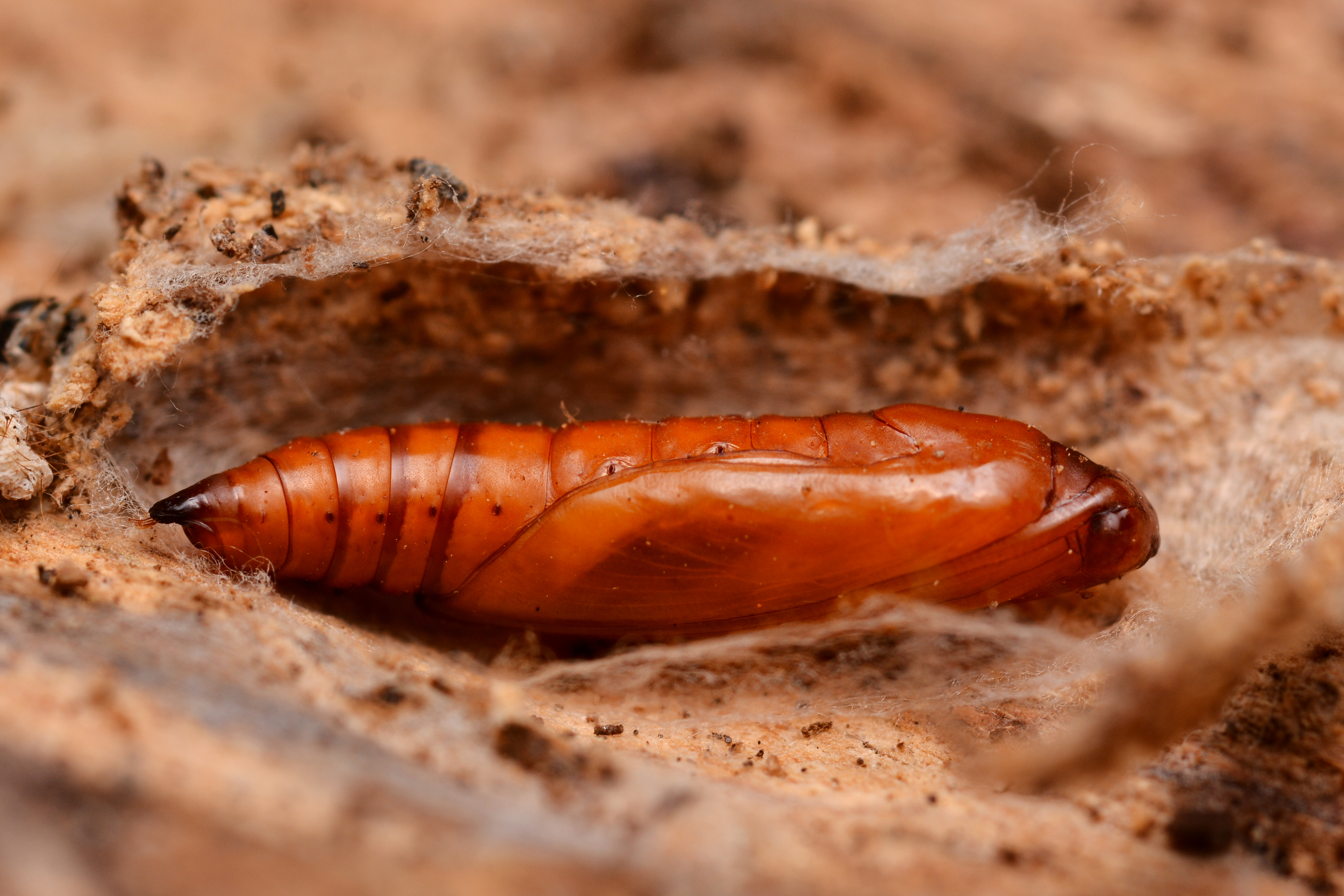
pupa

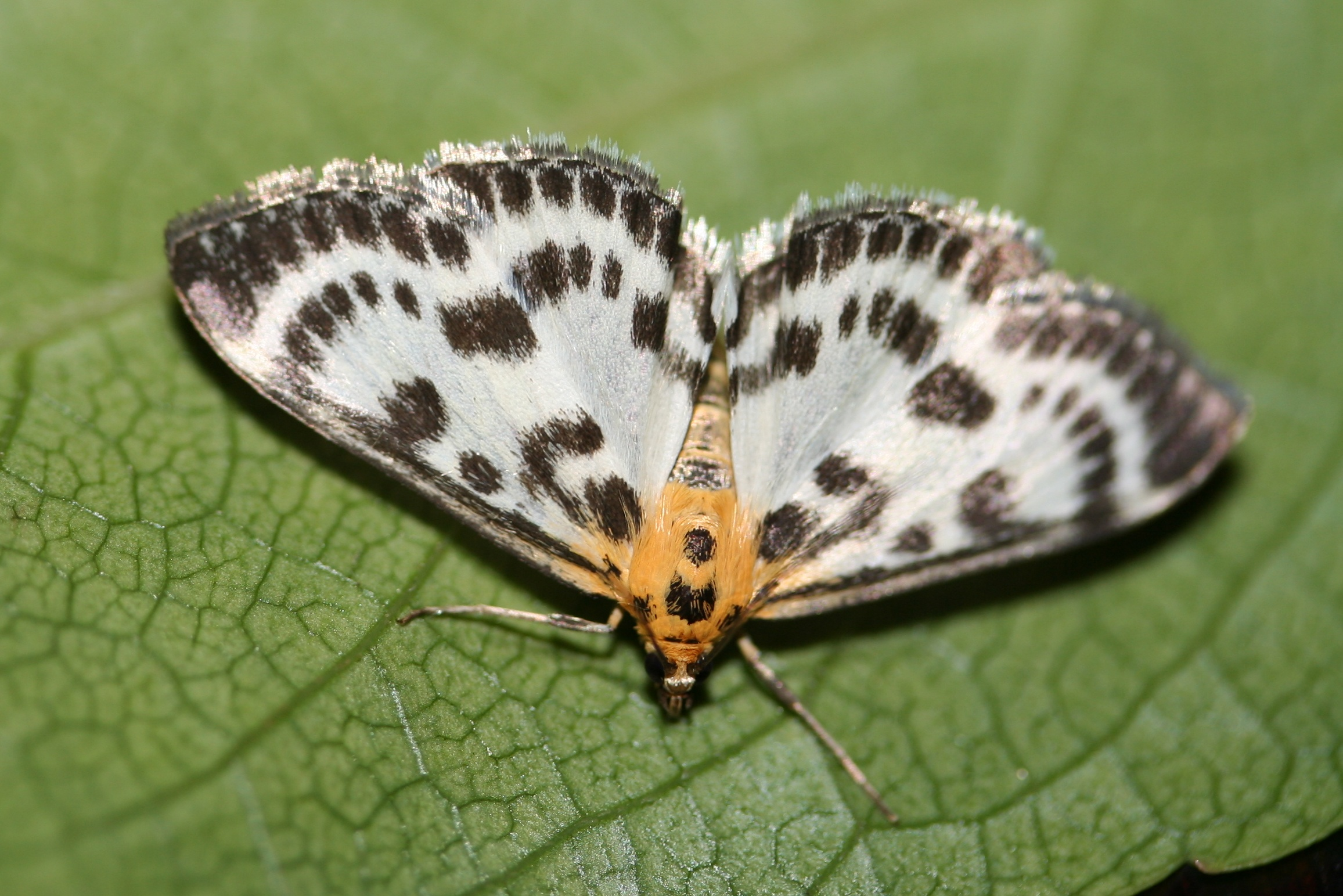
imago

== Distribution ==
The moth has been recorded in Asia, Europe and North America. In both Canada and the United States of America it is an exotic.

== Taxonomy ==
Carl Linnaeus placed the small magpie, along with ″the rest of the moths″, in the now obsolete genus Phalaena. It has since been moved to the Eurrhypara and Pyralis before ending up in its present genus Anania, which refers to without pain. Anania was raised by the German entomologist Jacob Hübner in 1823 and refers to ″his pleasure in the beauty of″ Anania funebris. The specific name hortulata refers to hortus – a garden, referring to the habitat.
