= Trichophysetis drancesalis =

Scientific classification
- Kingdom: Animalia
- Phylum: Arthropoda
- Clade: Pancrustacea
- Class: Insecta
- Order: Lepidoptera
- Family: Crambidae
- Genus: Trichophysetis
- Species: T. drancesalis

Binomial name
- Trichophysetis drancesalis (Walker, 1858)

Synonyms
- Hydrocampa drancesalis Walker, 1858; Nymphula drancesalis

Species of moth

Trichophysetis drancesalis is a moth in the family Crambidae. It is found on Borneo.
