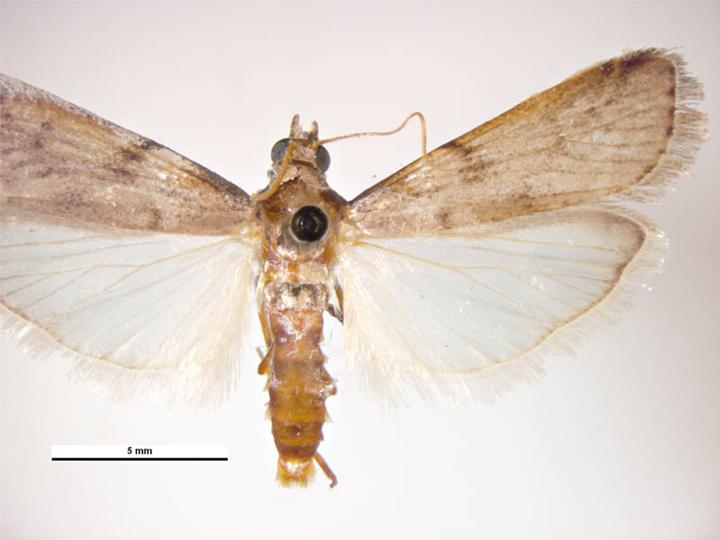
- Male
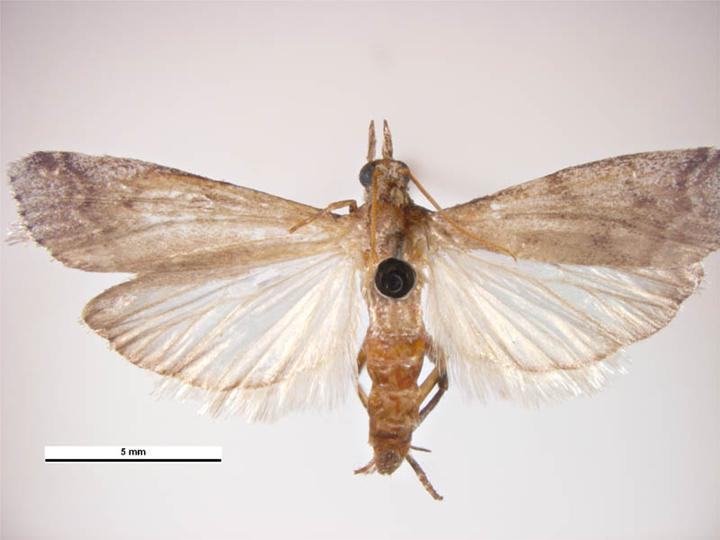
- Female

Scientific classification
- Kingdom: Animalia
- Phylum: Arthropoda
- Class: Insecta
- Order: Lepidoptera
- Family: Pyralidae
- Subfamily: Phycitinae
- Genus: Amyelois; Amsel, 1956
- Species: A. transitella

Binomial name
- Amyelois transitella (Walker, 1863)

Synonyms
- Genus; Paramyelois Heinrich, 1956; Species; Paramyelois transitella (Walker, 1863); Emporia cassiae Dyar, 1917; Myelois duplipunctella Ragonot, 1887; Nephopterix notatalis Walker, 1863; Myelois solitella Zeller, 1881; Myelois venipars Dyar, 1914

= Amyelois =

Genus of moths

Amyelois is a monotypic snout moth genus described by Hans Georg Amsel in 1956. Its single species, Amyelois transitella, the navel orangeworm, described by Francis Walker in 1863, is endemic to the tropical Western Hemisphere, including the southern United States. Its abundance in California increased greatly during the first half of the 20th century.

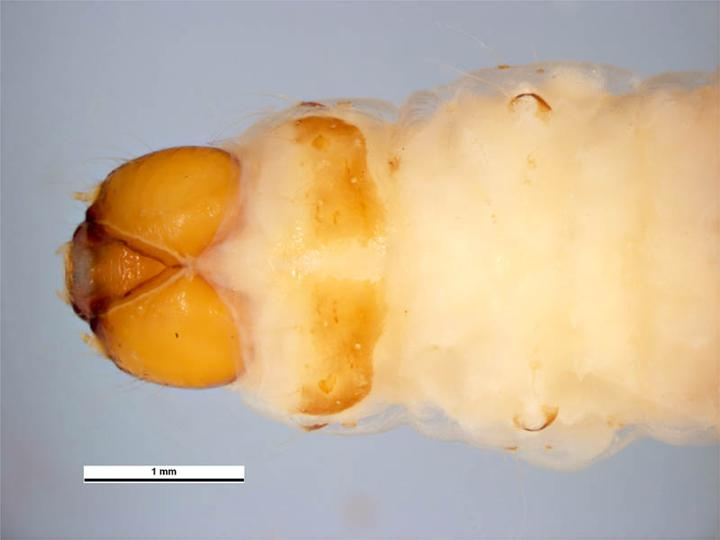
Larva head

The wingspan is 9.7 to 10.9 mm. Adults are on wing from the end of March to the end of October in California.

The larvae are considered a commercial pest of a number of California crops, including walnut (Juglans regia), fig (Ficus carica), almond (Prunus dulcis) and pistachio (Pistacia vera).

== Pheromones ==
Female A. transitella release very similar sex pheromones to that of female Pyralis farinalis. Both species release the pheromone (Z,Z)-11,13-hexa decadienal which is used to attract males. Male P. farinalis have been observed attempting to mate with female A. transitella, but it does not seem as though these copulations are successful in producing offspring.
