= Trichophysetis obnubilalis =

Scientific classification
- Kingdom: Animalia
- Phylum: Arthropoda
- Clade: Pancrustacea
- Class: Insecta
- Order: Lepidoptera
- Family: Crambidae
- Genus: Trichophysetis
- Species: T. obnubilalis

Binomial name
- Trichophysetis obnubilalis (Christoph, 1881)

Synonyms
- Parapoynx obnubilalis Christoph, 1881

Species of moth

Trichophysetis obnubilalis is a moth in the family Crambidae. It is found in Russia (Amur).
