= Trichophysetis crocoplaga =

Scientific classification
- Kingdom: Animalia
- Phylum: Arthropoda
- Clade: Pancrustacea
- Class: Insecta
- Order: Lepidoptera
- Family: Crambidae
- Genus: Trichophysetis
- Species: T. crocoplaga

Binomial name
- Trichophysetis crocoplaga Lower 1903

Species of moth

Trichophysetis crocoplaga is a moth in the family Crambidae. It is found in Australia, where it has been recorded from Queensland.
