= Trichophysetis nigridiscalis =

Scientific classification
- Kingdom: Animalia
- Phylum: Arthropoda
- Clade: Pancrustacea
- Class: Insecta
- Order: Lepidoptera
- Family: Crambidae
- Genus: Trichophysetis
- Species: T. nigridiscalis

Binomial name
- Trichophysetis nigridiscalis Warren, 1895

Species of moth

Trichophysetis nigridiscalis is a moth in the family Crambidae. It is found in India.
