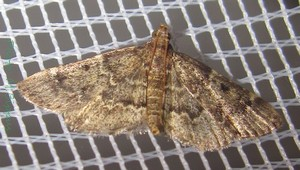

Scientific classification
- Kingdom: Animalia
- Phylum: Arthropoda
- Clade: Pancrustacea
- Class: Insecta
- Order: Lepidoptera
- Family: Pyralidae
- Genus: Pyralis
- Species: P. manihotalis

Binomial name
- Pyralis manihotalis Guenee, 1854

Synonyms
- Pyralis achatina Butler, 1877; Pyralis vetusalis Walker, [1859]; Asopia gerontesalis Walker, 1859; Pyralis gerontesalis; Asopia gerontialis (misspelling); Sacatia laudatella Walker, 1863; Pyralis despectalis Walker, [1866]; Pyralis miseralis Walker, [1866]; Asopia haematinalis Saalmüller, 1880; Endotricha centripunctalis Gaede, 1916; Pyralis pupalis Strand, 1919; Pyralis ingentalis Caradja, 1927; Pyralis compsobathra Meyrick, 1932

= Pyralis manihotalis =

Species of moth

Pyralis manihotalis is a moth of the family Pyralidae described by Achille Guenée in 1854.

== Distribution ==
It is a widespread, pan-tropical species (Robinson et al., 1994), known from Africa, India, Sri Lanka, China, Taiwan, Thailand, Malaysia, Singapore, Indonesia, the Philippines, Australia, Samoa, Hawaii, South America and the West Indies. It is occasionally recorded from Europe through accidental importation in bones and animal hides.

== Description ==
The wingspan is about 12–20 mm (Robinson et al., 1994; Weinstein & Edwards, 1994; Wang, 2000), although given as a rather generous 24–37 mm in Goater (1986).

== Ecology ==
The larvae feed on a wide range of dead and decaying materials, including stored grain, meal, pulses, dried fruit, bones, animal hides (Goater, 1986; Robinson et al., 1994) and chocolate. Adults are primarily nocturnal, though easily disturbed by day in warehouses; they are attracted to ultraviolet light (Robinson et al., 1994). Weinstein and Edwards (1994) found a self-sustaining population of this moth species feeding on bat guano in a cave.
