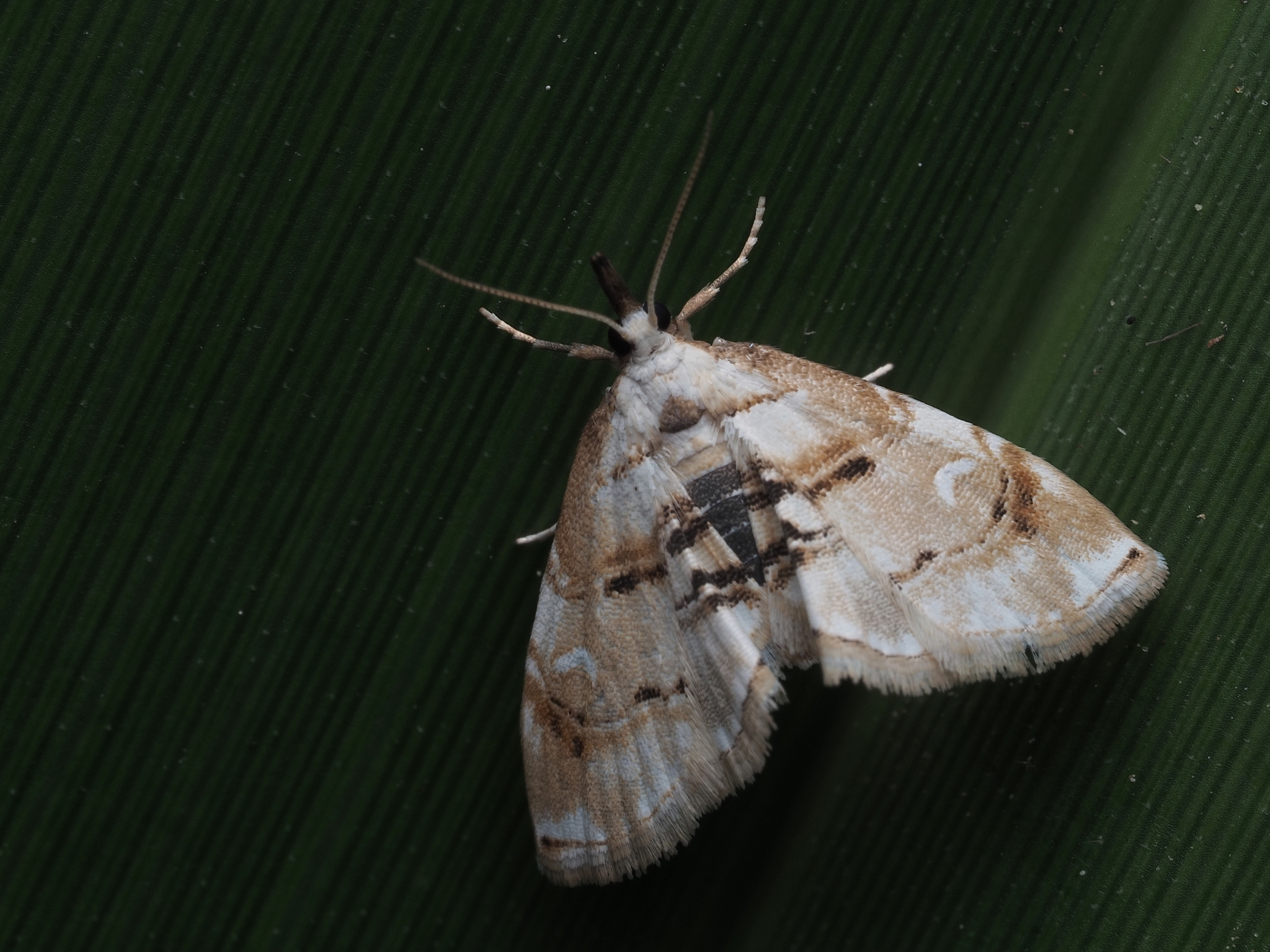
- Trichophysetis cretacea seen in Auckland, New Zealand

Scientific classification
- Kingdom: Animalia
- Phylum: Arthropoda
- Clade: Pancrustacea
- Class: Insecta
- Order: Lepidoptera
- Family: Crambidae
- Genus: Trichophysetis
- Species: T. cretacea

Binomial name
- Trichophysetis cretacea (Butler, 1879)

Synonyms
- Hydrocampa cretacea Butler, 1879; Hendecasis cretacea; Neohendecasis cretacea

= Trichophysetis cretacea =

Species of moth

Trichophysetis cretacea, the jasmine bud borer, is a moth in the family Crambidae described by Arthur Gardiner Butler in 1879. It is found in Japan, Russia and China.

The wingspan is 12–15 mm.

The bore the flower buds of Jasminum sambac.
