= Trichophysetis fulvifusalis =

Scientific classification
- Kingdom: Animalia
- Phylum: Arthropoda
- Clade: Pancrustacea
- Class: Insecta
- Order: Lepidoptera
- Family: Crambidae
- Genus: Trichophysetis
- Species: T. fulvifusalis

Binomial name
- Trichophysetis fulvifusalis Lower, 1903

Species of moth

Trichophysetis fulvifusalis is a moth in the family Crambidae. It is found in Australia, where it has been recorded from Queensland.

This species has a wingspan of 18mm for the male.
