= Trichophysetis nigripalpis =

Scientific classification
- Kingdom: Animalia
- Phylum: Arthropoda
- Clade: Pancrustacea
- Class: Insecta
- Order: Lepidoptera
- Family: Crambidae
- Genus: Trichophysetis
- Species: T. nigripalpis

Binomial name
- Trichophysetis nigripalpis (Warren, 1896)

Synonyms
- Callinaias nigripalpis Warren, 1896

Species of moth

Trichophysetis nigripalpis is a moth in the family Crambidae. It is found in India.
