= Black Ivory Coffee =

Brand of coffee produced in Thailand

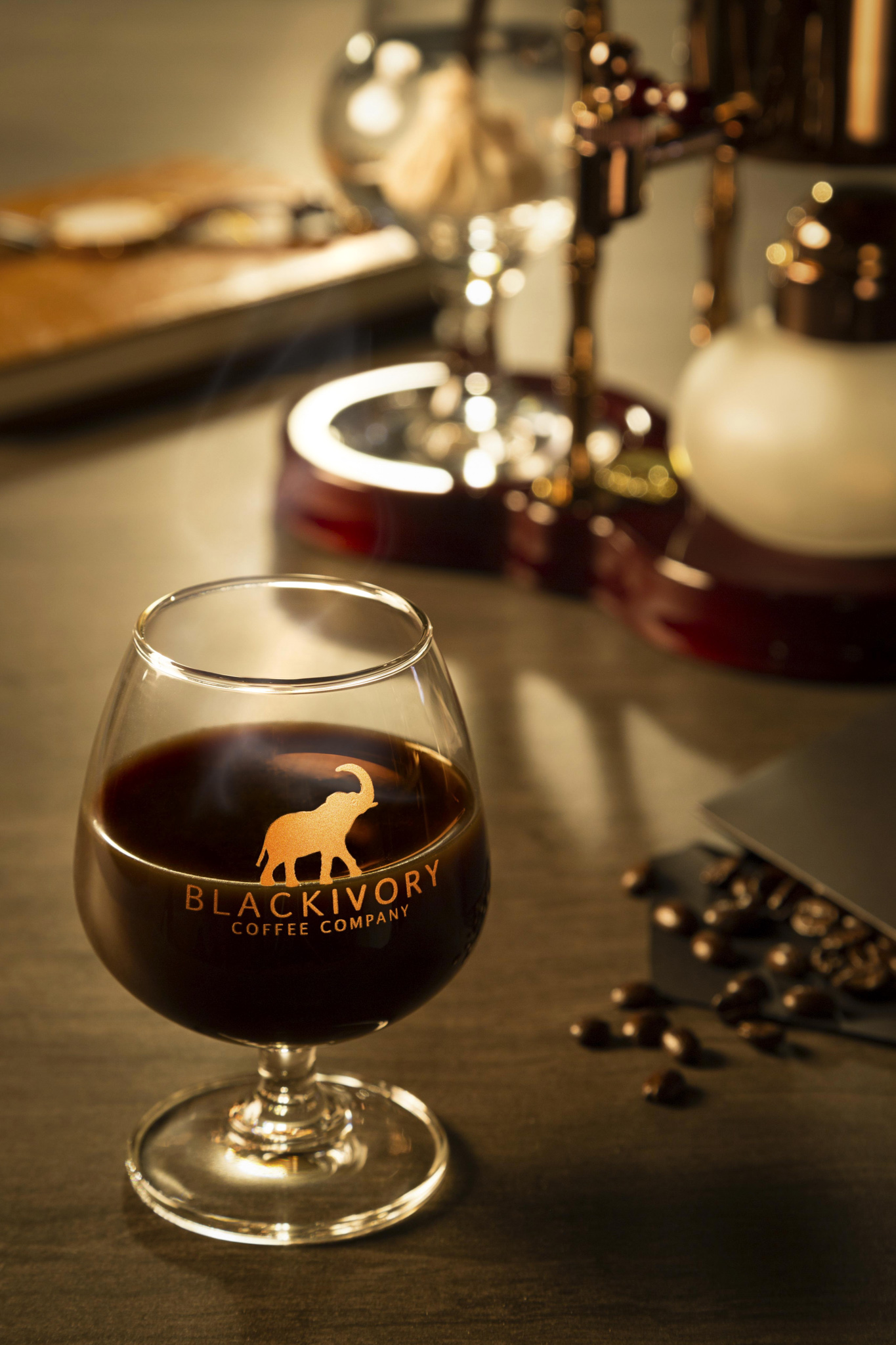
- Black Ivory Coffee stemware
- Product type: Coffee
- Current owner: Black Ivory Coffee Company Ltd.
- Produced by: Black Ivory Coffee Company Ltd.
- Country: Thailand
- Introduced: 2012; 14 years ago
- Related brands: Kopi luwak
- Markets: Worldwide
- Website: blackivorycoffee.com

Black Ivory Coffee is a brand of coffee produced by the Black Ivory Coffee Company Ltd in Surin province, Northeast Thailand or Isan from Arabica coffee beans consumed by elephants and collected from their waste. A recent study shows that the taste and chemical profiles of Black Ivory Coffee is potentially influenced by the microbial fermentation of coffee components inside the elephants' gut microbiota. The company partners with families that owns elephants in the region.

== History ==
Black Ivory was initially produced by the Black Ivory Coffee Co. Ltd. at the Golden Triangle Asian Elephant Foundation, a sanctuary in Chiang Saen district in Northern Thailand, that cares for rescued elephants. The company's founder, Canadian Blake Dinkin, originally considered producing kopi luwak from civet droppings. He also considered lions and giraffes before learning that elephants sometimes eat coffee during the dry season. From an initial unsavoury prototype and after nine years of tests and trials, he created a satisfactory quality in 2012 with an initial production of 150 kg. The first Black Ivory Coffee was sold to hotels in Thailand and the Maldives. Later, production moved from the Golden Triangle Foundation to the Surin province, Northeast Thailand called Isan with 20 contributing elephants. During that period, the company donated parts of its revenue to the Foundation to support elephant healthcare.

== Production method ==
Black Ivory Coffee is made entirely from Arabica coffee, handpicked from high-altitude farms Northeast Thailand where the cooler climate and rich soil enhance bean quality and flavor. Nowadays, a few elephants participate in the production process where the supply of Black Ivory relies on three steps: 1) The quality of coffee fruit crop; 2) The amount of beans transformed in the elephants' digestive system between 10 to 72 hours; 3) The contribution of mahouts who care for the elephants and recover the beans.

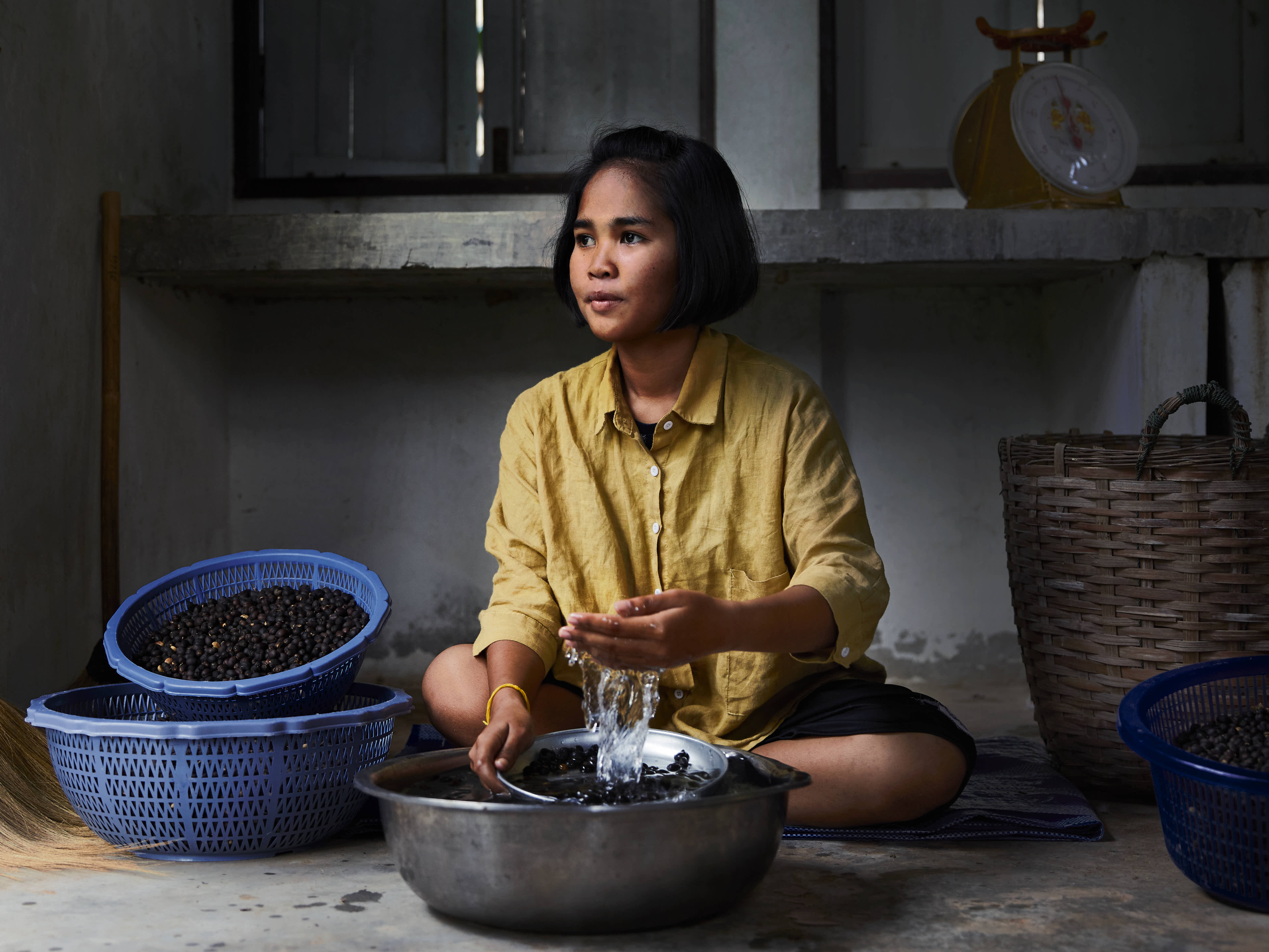
Black Ivory Coffee beans for making coffee

Elephants are fed raw cherries together with their normal diet of rice and bananas in order to collect useful coffee cherries. From 33 kg of coffee fruits collected from the trees only one kg of coffee is produced at the end of the process. That is to say, a significant amount of crushed cherries is lost when excreted. The production process of Black Ivory Coffee emphasizes ethical animal welfare. In addition, the consumption of coffee cherries does not adversely affect elephants' health.

== Reception ==
Phys.org, an online science, research and technology news aggregator, stated that the coffee is prized for its smooth, chocolaty flavor, and less bitter than regular coffee. It also received favorable reception and earned praise from gourmet coffee aficionados, luxury restaurants, and exclusive gatherings from around the world. The coffee is served to a handful of five-star hotels including the renown Ritz-Carlton Toronto that launched a special coffee menu featuring Black Ivory.

== Availability ==
The coffee is sold to select luxury hotels and online where it costs US$50 per cup. The supply of Black Ivory coffee depends on the availability of coffee cherries, the number of beans destroyed through chewing of the beans and the ability of the mahouts and their wives to recover intact beans. The high price of the product is largely due to the large number of coffee cherries needed to produce the finished product: 33 kilograms (72 pounds) of raw coffee cherries results in one kilogram (2.2 lb; 1,000 g; 35 oz) of the finished product. Most of the beans are not recoverable as they are chewed by the elephants, become fragmented, or are lost in the bush after being excreted.

== See also ==
- Kopi luwak
- Panda tea
- List of delicacies
