= Trichophysetis flavimargo =

Scientific classification
- Kingdom: Animalia
- Phylum: Arthropoda
- Clade: Pancrustacea
- Class: Insecta
- Order: Lepidoptera
- Family: Crambidae
- Genus: Trichophysetis
- Species: T. flavimargo

Binomial name
- Trichophysetis flavimargo (Warren, 1897)

Synonyms
- Callinaias flavimargo Warren, 1897

Species of moth

Trichophysetis flavimargo is a moth in the family Crambidae. It is found in South Africa.
