= Trichophysetis microspila =

Scientific classification
- Kingdom: Animalia
- Phylum: Arthropoda
- Clade: Pancrustacea
- Class: Insecta
- Order: Lepidoptera
- Family: Crambidae
- Genus: Trichophysetis
- Species: T. microspila

Binomial name
- Trichophysetis microspila (Meyrick, 1894)

Species of moth

Trichophysetis microspila is a moth in the family Crambidae. It is found on Sumbawa.
