= Trichophysetis pygmaealis =

Scientific classification
- Kingdom: Animalia
- Phylum: Arthropoda
- Clade: Pancrustacea
- Class: Insecta
- Order: Lepidoptera
- Family: Crambidae
- Genus: Trichophysetis
- Species: T. pygmaealis

Binomial name
- Trichophysetis pygmaealis (Warren, 1896)

Synonyms
- Nymphula pygmaealis Warren, 1896

Species of moth

Trichophysetis pygmaealis is a moth in the family Crambidae. It is found in India (Khasi Hills).
