= Pyralis transcaspica =

Scientific classification
- Domain: Eukaryota
- Kingdom: Animalia
- Phylum: Arthropoda
- Class: Insecta
- Order: Lepidoptera
- Family: Pyralidae
- Genus: Pyralis
- Species: P. transcaspica

Binomial name
- Pyralis transcaspica Rebel, 1903

Species of moth

Pyralis transcaspica is a species of snout moth. It is found in Turkmenistan.
