= Trichophysetis hampsoni =

Scientific classification
- Kingdom: Animalia
- Phylum: Arthropoda
- Clade: Pancrustacea
- Class: Insecta
- Order: Lepidoptera
- Family: Crambidae
- Genus: Trichophysetis
- Species: T. hampsoni

Binomial name
- Trichophysetis hampsoni South, 1901

Species of moth

Trichophysetis hampsoni is a moth in the family Crambidae. It is found in China.
