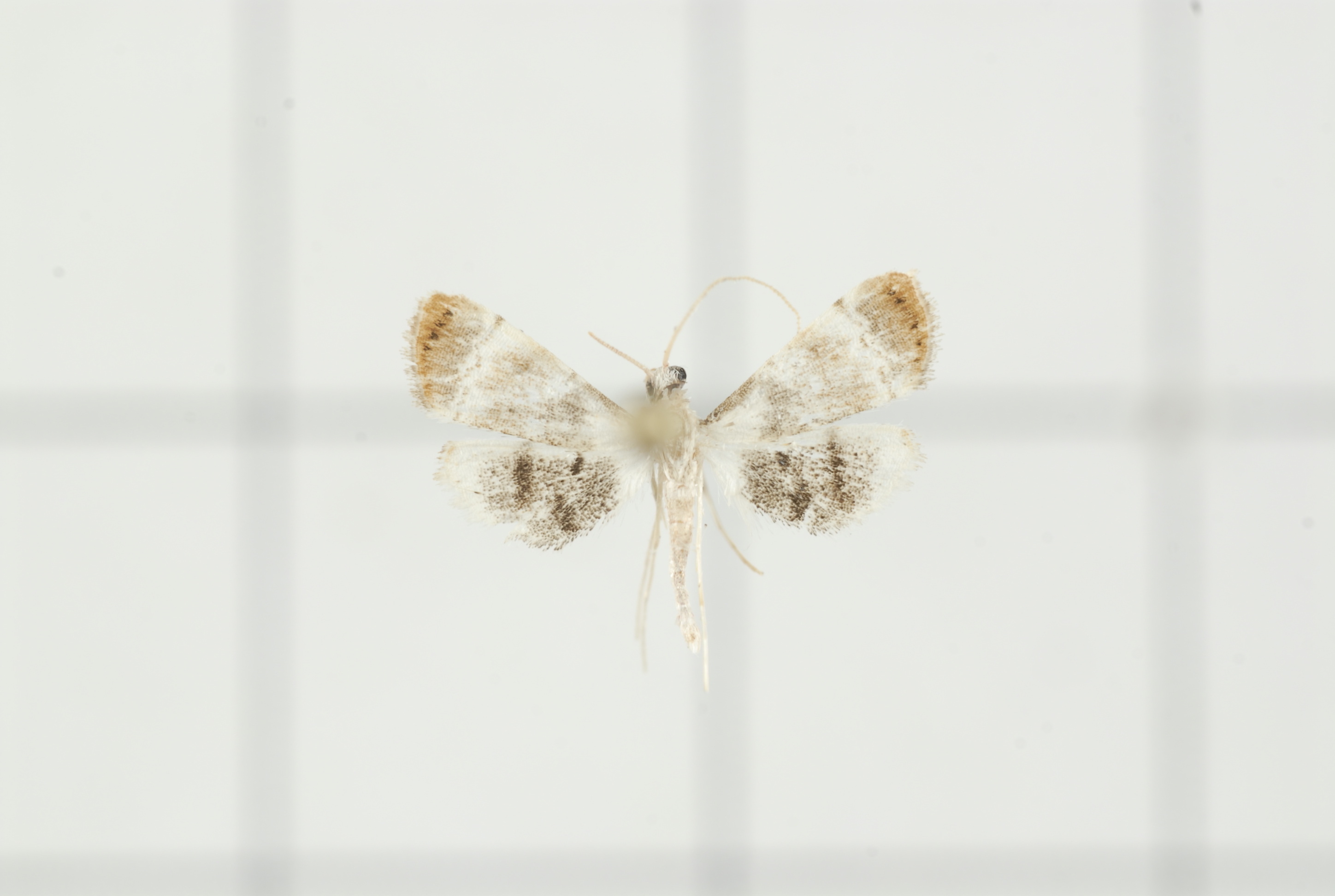

Scientific classification
- Kingdom: Animalia
- Phylum: Arthropoda
- Clade: Pancrustacea
- Class: Insecta
- Order: Lepidoptera
- Family: Crambidae
- Genus: Trichophysetis
- Species: T. rufoterminalis

Binomial name
- Trichophysetis rufoterminalis (Christoph, 1881)

Synonyms
- Parapoynx rufoterminalis Christoph, 1881; Cangetta venustalis Warren, 1896; Puriella problematica Strand, 1918

= Trichophysetis rufoterminalis =

Species of moth

Trichophysetis rufoterminalis is a moth in the family Crambidae. It is found in Russia, India, Taiwan and Japan.
