= Trichophysetis gracilentalis =

Scientific classification
- Kingdom: Animalia
- Phylum: Arthropoda
- Clade: Pancrustacea
- Class: Insecta
- Order: Lepidoptera
- Family: Crambidae
- Genus: Trichophysetis
- Species: T. gracilentalis

Binomial name
- Trichophysetis gracilentalis (C. Swinhoe, 1890)

Synonyms
- Callinaias gracilentalis C. Swinhoe, 1890

Species of moth

Trichophysetis gracilentalis is a moth in the family Crambidae. It is found in Myanmar.
