= Trichophysetis nigricincta =

Scientific classification
- Kingdom: Animalia
- Phylum: Arthropoda
- Clade: Pancrustacea
- Class: Insecta
- Order: Lepidoptera
- Family: Crambidae
- Genus: Trichophysetis
- Species: T. nigricincta

Binomial name
- Trichophysetis nigricincta Hampson, 1893

Species of moth

Trichophysetis nigricincta is a moth in the family Crambidae. It is found in India (Assam) and Sri Lanka.
