= Trichophysetis nesias =

Scientific classification
- Kingdom: Animalia
- Phylum: Arthropoda
- Clade: Pancrustacea
- Class: Insecta
- Order: Lepidoptera
- Family: Crambidae
- Genus: Trichophysetis
- Species: T. nesias

Binomial name
- Trichophysetis nesias (Meyrick, 1886)

Synonyms
- Trieropis nesias Meyrick, 1886

Species of moth

Trichophysetis nesias is a moth in the family Crambidae. It is found on Tonga.
