= Trichophysetis whitei =

Scientific classification
- Kingdom: Animalia
- Phylum: Arthropoda
- Clade: Pancrustacea
- Class: Insecta
- Order: Lepidoptera
- Family: Crambidae
- Genus: Trichophysetis
- Species: T. whitei

Binomial name
- Trichophysetis whitei Rebel, 1906

Species of moth

Trichophysetis whitei is a species of moth from the Crambidae family. It is found in the Canary Islands.

Their wingspan is about 12 mm.
