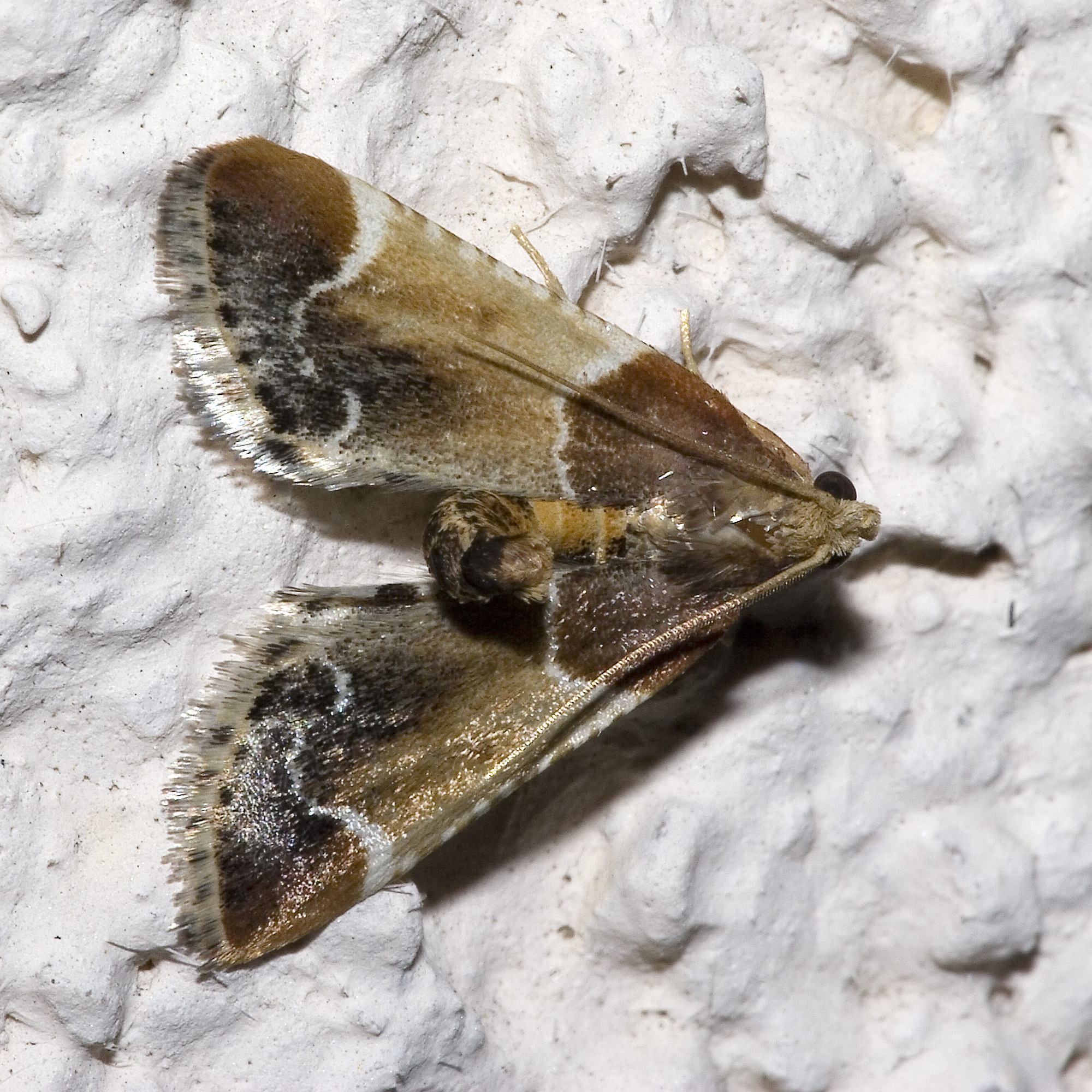

Scientific classification
- Kingdom: Animalia
- Phylum: Arthropoda
- Clade: Pancrustacea
- Class: Insecta
- Order: Lepidoptera
- Family: Pyralidae
- Tribe: Pyralini
- Genus: Pyralis; Linnaeus, [1758]

Synonyms
- Aletes Rafinesque, 1815; Asopia Treitschke, 1828; Ceropsina Rafinesque, 1815; Sacatia Walker, 1863; Spyrella Rafinesque, 1815

= Pyralis =

Genus of moths

Pyralis is a genus of snout moths and currently contains 87 described species. It was described by Carl Linnaeus in 1758.

== Selected species ==
- Pyralis cardinalis Kaila, Huemer, Mutanen, Tyllinen & Wikström, 2020
- Pyralis caustica (Meyrick, 1884)
- Pyralis costinotalis Hampson, 1917
- Pyralis electalis Hulst, 1886
- Pyralis farinalis (Linnaeus, 1758)
- Pyralis faviusalis Walker, 1859
- Pyralis haematinalis (Saalmüller, 1880)
- Pyralis joannisi Leraut, 2005
- Pyralis kacheticalis (Christoph, 1893)
- Pyralis laudatella Walker, 1863
- Pyralis lienigialis Zeller, 1843
- Pyralis manihotalis Guenée, 1854
- Pyralis palesalis Walker, 1859
- Pyralis papaleonei Huemer, Kaila & Segerer, 2026
- Pyralis perversalis Herrich-Schäffer, 1849
- Pyralis pictalis (J. Curtis, 1834)
- Pyralis regalis Denis & Schiffermüller, 1775
- Pyralis subjectalis Walker, 1866
- Pyralis transcaspica Rebel, 1903
- Pyralis trifascialis Moore, 1877

== Former species ==
- Pyralis preciosalis Guillermet in Viette & Guillermet, 1996
