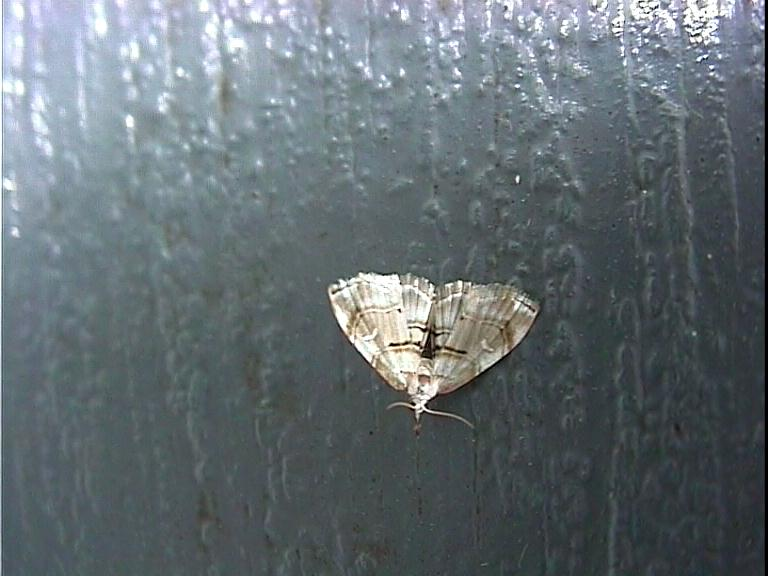

Scientific classification
- Kingdom: Animalia
- Phylum: Arthropoda
- Class: Insecta
- Order: Lepidoptera
- Family: Crambidae
- Genus: Trichophysetis
- Species: T. neophyla

Binomial name
- Trichophysetis neophyla Meyrick, 1884

= Trichophysetis neophyla =

Species of moth

Trichophysetis neophyla is a moth of the family Crambidae. It was described by Edward Meyrick in 1884 and is known from Australia.

The wingspan is about 12 mm.
