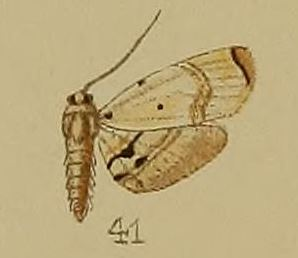

Scientific classification
- Kingdom: Animalia
- Phylum: Arthropoda
- Clade: Pancrustacea
- Class: Insecta
- Order: Lepidoptera
- Family: Crambidae
- Genus: Trichophysetis
- Species: T. umbrifusalis

Binomial name
- Trichophysetis umbrifusalis Hampson, 1912

Synonyms
- Trichophysetis umbrifusalis ab. suffusalis Strand, 1914

= Trichophysetis umbrifusalis =

Species of moth

Trichophysetis umbrifusalis is a moth in the family Crambidae described by George Hampson in 1912. It is found in India.
