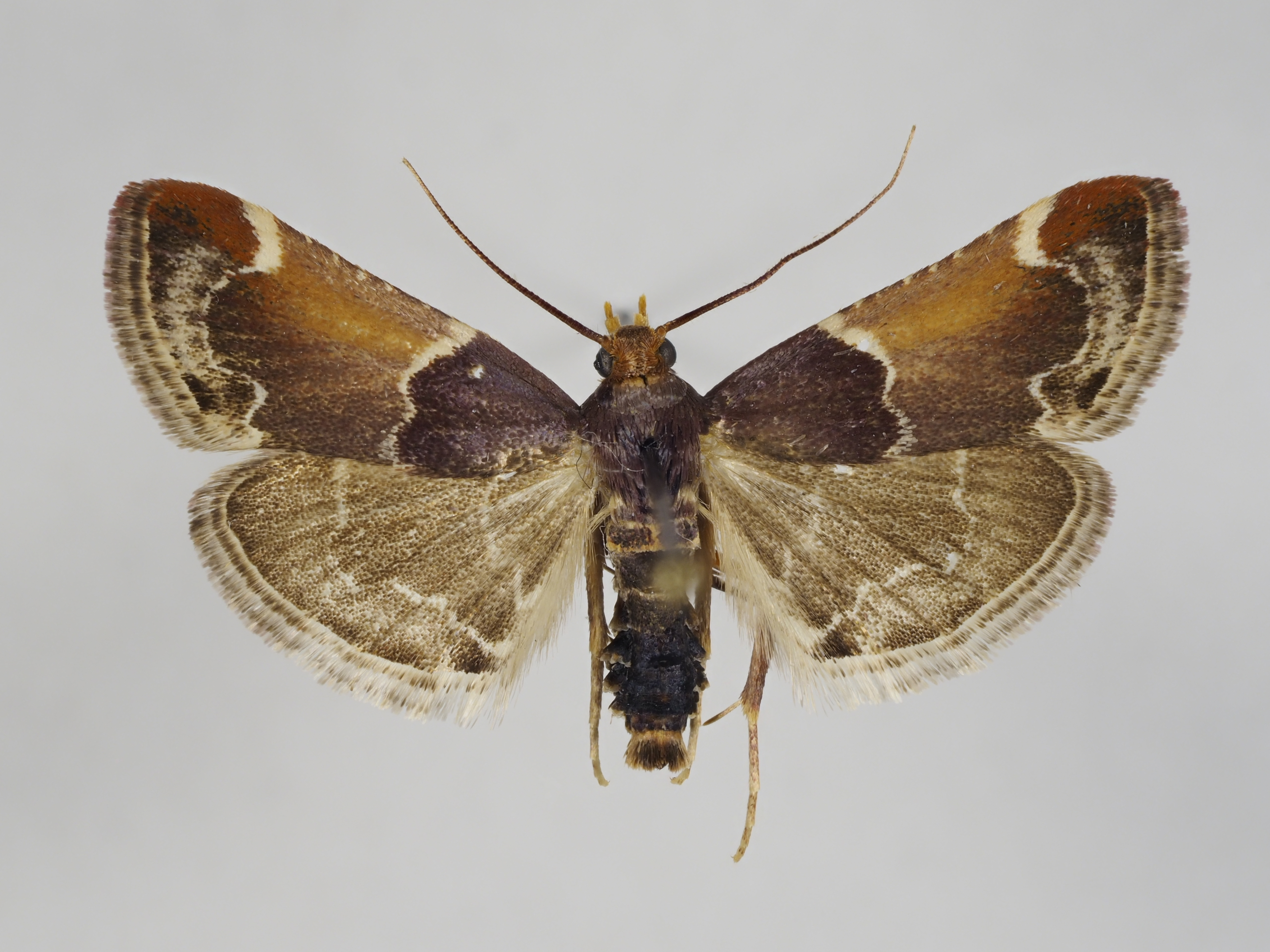

Scientific classification
- Kingdom: Animalia
- Phylum: Arthropoda
- Clade: Pancrustacea
- Class: Insecta
- Order: Lepidoptera
- Family: Pyralidae
- Genus: Pyralis
- Species: P. lienigialis

Binomial name
- Pyralis lienigialis (Zeller, 1843)

Synonyms
- Asopia lienigialis Zeller, 1843; Pyralis lienigialis var. dacicalis Caradja, 1903

= Pyralis lienigialis =

Species of moth

Pyralis lienigialis, the northern meal moth, is a species of snout moth. It is found in France, Portugal, Spain, Italy, Great Britain, Fennoscandia, Estonia, Latvia, Russia, Ukraine, Moldavia and Romania.

The wingspan is 22–26 mm. Adults are on wing from June to September.

The larvae are thought to feed on stored cereals such as barley and hay.
