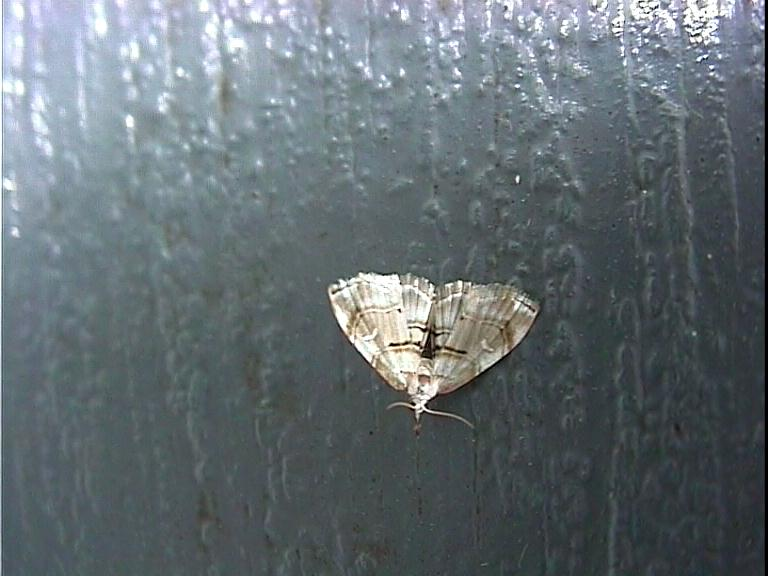

Scientific classification
- Domain: Eukaryota
- Kingdom: Animalia
- Phylum: Arthropoda
- Class: Insecta
- Order: Lepidoptera
- Family: Crambidae
- Subfamily: Cybalomiinae
- Genus: Trichophysetis; Meyrick, 1884

Synonyms
- Alpherakia Ragonot, 1890; Callinaias Warren in Swinhoe, 1890; Callinais Swinhoe, 1890; Crasigenes Meyrick, 1894; Puriella Strand, 1918; Trichophyretis Pagenstecher, 1909; Trieropis Meyrick, 1886

= Trichophysetis =

Genus of moths

Trichophysetis is a genus of moths of the family Crambidae.

== Species ==
- Trichophysetis acutangulalis Hampson 1903
- Trichophysetis aurantidiscalis Caradja 1934
- Trichophysetis bipunctalis Caradja 1925
- Trichophysetis cretacea (Butler, 1879)
- Trichophysetis crocoplaga Lower 1903
- Trichophysetis drancesalis (Walker 1858)
- Trichophysetis flavimargo (Warren, 1897)
- Trichophysetis fulvifusalis Lower 1903
- Trichophysetis gracilentalis (Swinhoe, 1890)
- Trichophysetis hampsoni South 1901
- Trichophysetis metamelalis Hampson 1899
- Trichophysetis microspila (Meyrick, 1894)
- Trichophysetis neophyla (Meyrick, 1884)
- Trichophysetis nesias (Meyrick, 1886)
- Trichophysetis nigricincta (Hampson 1893)
- Trichophysetis nigridiscalis Warren 1895
- Trichophysetis nigripalpis Warren 1896
- Trichophysetis obnubilalis (Christoph 1881)
- Trichophysetis poliochyta Turner 1911
- Trichophysetis preciosalis Guillermet 1996
- Trichophysetis pygmaealis Warren 1896
- Trichophysetis rufoterminalis (Christoph, 1881)
- Trichophysetis umbrifusalis Hampson 1912
- Trichophysetis whitei Rebel, 1906
