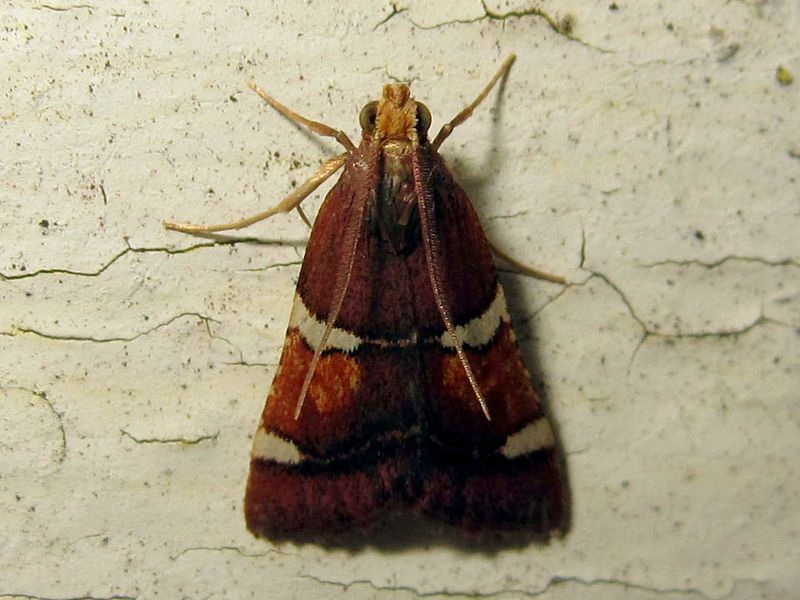

Scientific classification
- Kingdom: Animalia
- Phylum: Arthropoda
- Class: Insecta
- Order: Lepidoptera
- Family: Pyralidae
- Genus: Pyralis
- Species: P. regalis

Binomial name
- Pyralis regalis Denis & Schiffermüller, 1775

Synonyms
- Pyralis pulchellalis Millière, 1873; Pyralis regalis sagarrai Leraut, 2005; Pyralis princeps Butler, 1889

= Pyralis regalis =

Species of moth

Pyralis regalis is a species of snout moth. It is found from most of Europe (except Ireland, Great Britain, Portugal, the Benelux, Germany and Norway) east to Asia, including China, Cambodia, Myanmar, India, Russia, Korea, Japan and Taiwan.

The wingspan is 16–20 mm. Adults are on wing from June to September.

Larvae have been recorded in a wasp honeycomb in Japan.
