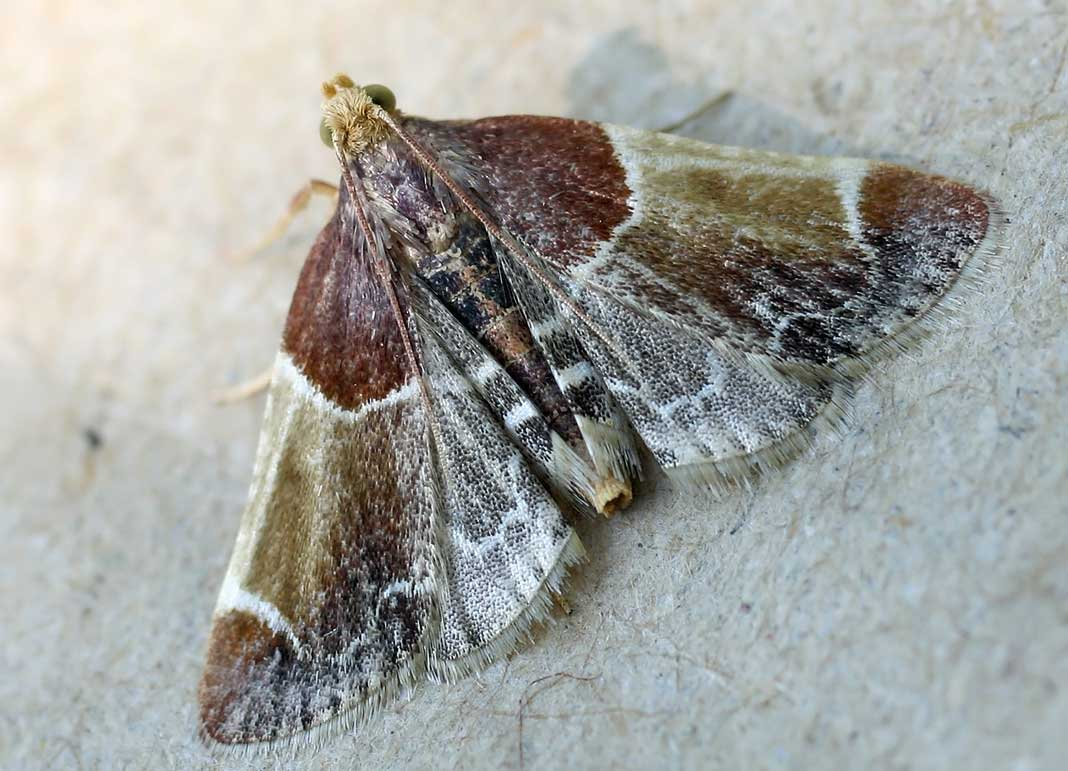
- Adult from above
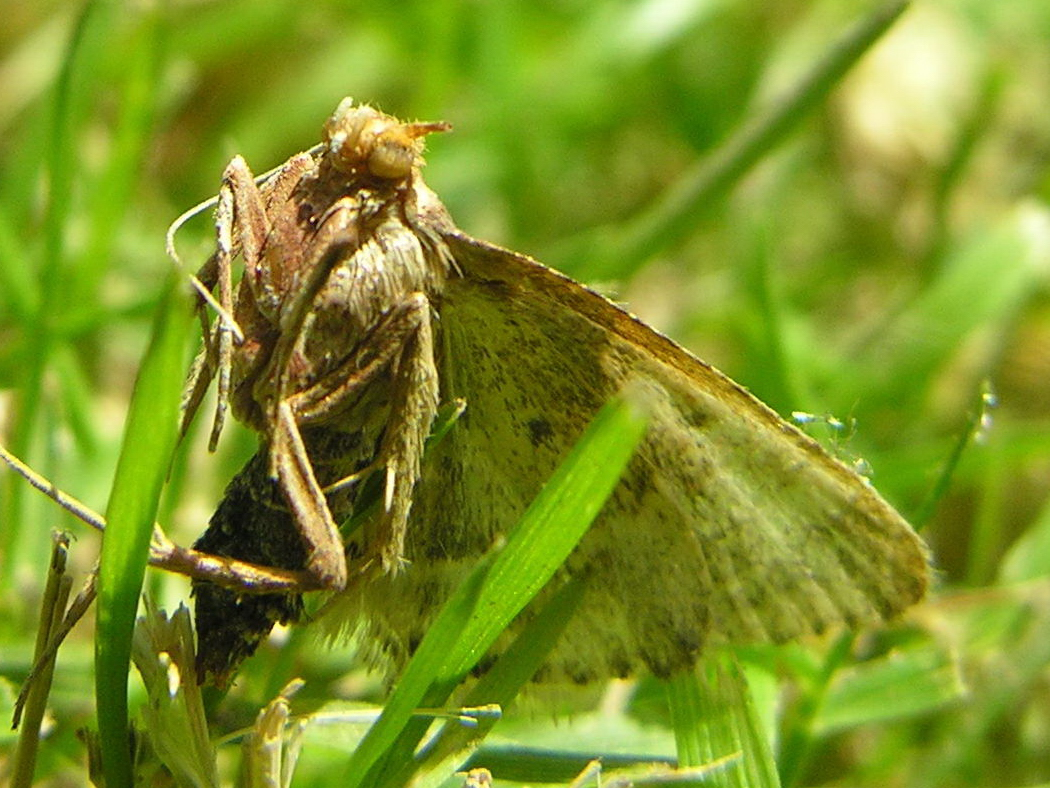
- The underwings have no conspicuous pattern

Scientific classification
- Kingdom: Animalia
- Phylum: Arthropoda
- Clade: Pancrustacea
- Class: Insecta
- Order: Lepidoptera
- Family: Pyralidae
- Genus: Pyralis
- Species: P. farinalis

Binomial name
- Pyralis farinalis (Linnaeus, 1758)

Synonyms
- Asopia farinalis Linnaeus, 1758

= Pyralis farinalis =

Meal moth

Species of moth

Pyralis farinalis, the meal moth, is a cosmopolitan moth of the family Pyralidae. Its larvae (caterpillars) are pests of certain stored foods, namely milled plant products.

It is the type species of the genus Pyralis, and by extension of its entire tribe (Pyralini), subfamily (Pyralinae) and family. Its synanthropic habits were noted even by 18th- and 19th-century naturalists, who described it using terms like domesticalis ("of home and hearth"), fraterna ("as close as a brother"), or the currently-valid farinalis ("of the flour").

At rest, adult moths (imagines) typically hold the tip of their abdomen at 90° to their body. Their upperwings are fairly colourful by moth standards, and have a wingspan of 18–30 mm. Adults fly from June to August. As adults do not live long after mating and eggs hatch quickly, this moth has a quick life cycle and is able to produce multiple generations within a single year.

In Great Britain and some other locations – particularly outside its natural range – it is mostly restricted to anthropogenic habitats of stored grain, e.g. barns and warehouses. However, it has been found in almond orchards among plant detritus and poultry farms among chicken manure.

P. farinalis is a species that is well adapted to living among humans and the urbanization that comes along with them. Though considered a pest to most, since it can decimate grain storages, humans have found uses for the moth. In Chinese culture it is the main ingredient of "insect tea." This drink is popular enough that scientists have been studying the moth's optimum growth conditions so they can possibly cultivate it for commercial use.

== Geographic range ==
Pyralis farinalis has been described as a "cosmopolitan" species, which means its range extends across most of the world. It is found all across the United States, but is mostly found along the eastern coast. This moth is most commonly seen in the Northeastern region. It is also found in Great Britain, in the Falkland Islands, and in China.

== Habitat ==
P. farinalis is typically found in silos or other grain storage buildings where the grain is stored poorly and moisture is able to infiltrate the grain supply. Places where refuse vegetable matter is able to accumulate are more likely to house P. farinalis than grain storage buildings where the environment is clean and dry. P. farinalis prefers to live in detritus and has been found in non-urban areas in almond orchards. Meal moths can live in various habitats of damp, moist plant debris, but also even in poultry manure.

== Food resources ==
=== Caterpillar ===
As caterpillars, P. farinalis subsists mostly on cereals, but will also feed upon other types of grain and vegetables, such as potatoes. The meal moth's larvae are also interesting because they feed on all parts of the grain plant and do not seem to have any preference for one part of another. The larvae are equally likely to eat a cereal plant's seed, bran, husk, or straw.

== Life history ==
Originally thought to be biennial species, it has been found that P. farinalis typically completes its entire life cycle in the course of eight weeks, and is capable of producing four generations within a year. Fast life cycles in these moths allow them to reproduce and grow their populations rapidly.

=== Life cycle ===
==== Egg ====
The eggs of P. farinalis are ellipsoid in shape and very wrinkled with creases running lengthwise along the egg. These wrinkles form a reticulated pattern on the surface of the egg. Eggs are usually laid between two and five days after copulation and hatch after a nine-day incubation period. A healthy female produces an average of 235 eggs in its lifetime.

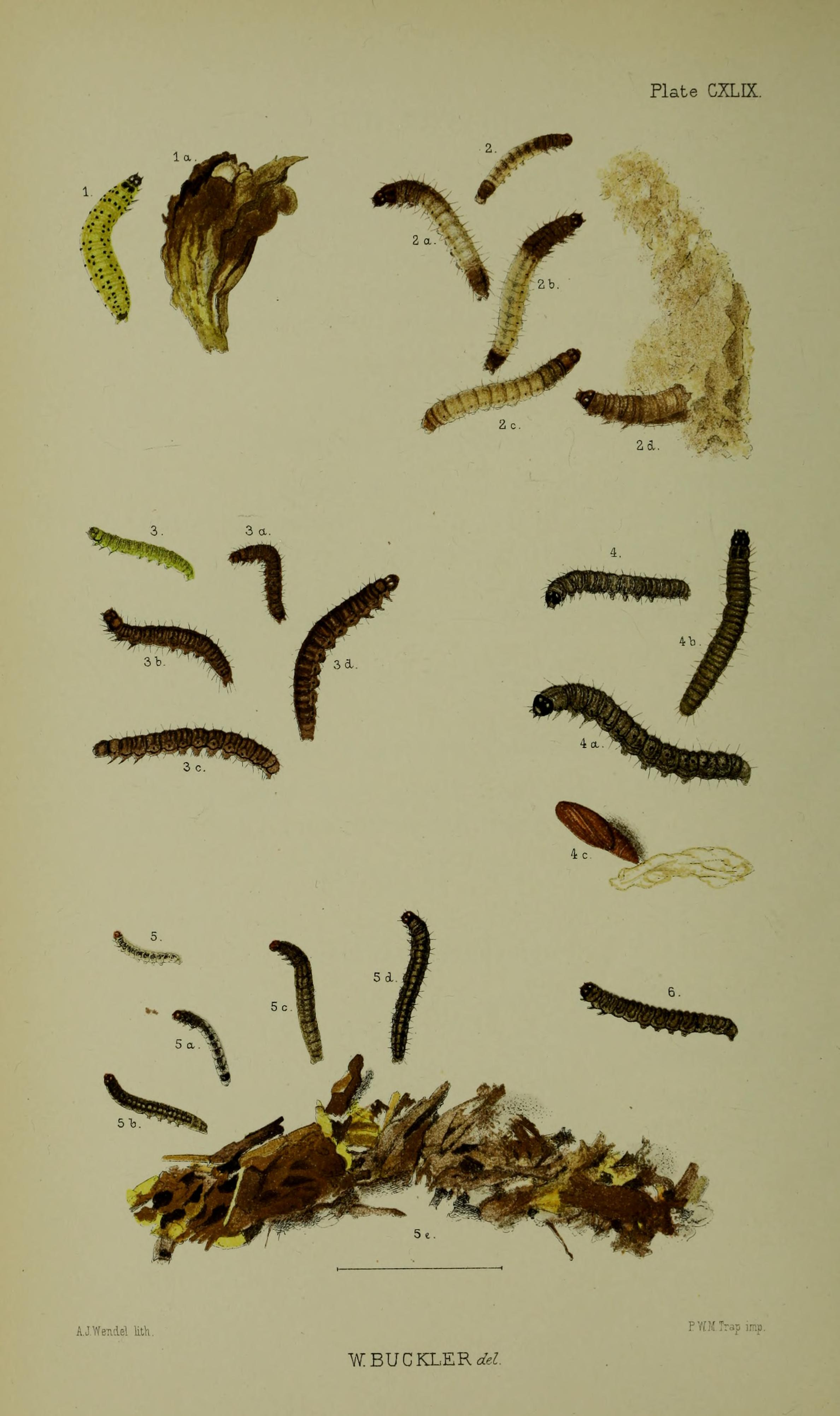
Figs. 2, 2a, 2b, 2c, 2d larvae in various stages

==== Caterpillar ====
The larvae of P. farinalis spend most of their time out of sight of predators and humans. They live in tunnels of silk and meal particles which keep them safe from predators and they come to the openings of these tunnels to feed.

==== Pupae ====
Once fully grown, the caterpillars leave their tubes and spin a cocoon where they will develop into an adult. After 6–8 weeks the pupae will emerge as fully developed adults.

==== Adult ====
Adults are usually fully developed between 60–65 days after oviposition. Virgin adults would then mate as quickly as possible. Once mated, males and females would usually only live for nine to ten more days.

== Enemies ==
=== Parasites ===
P. farinalis is parasitized by a number of species. These include:

- Meteorus ictericus
- Tetrastichus
- Lespidea tarsalis
- Apantales carpatus
- Goniozus columbianus
- Metacoelus mansuetos
- Melanophora roralis

== Mating ==
=== Female/male interactions ===
==== Pheromones ====
An odd behavior that male meal moths exhibit is the attempt to mate with other species, such as Amyelois transitella. It is hypothesized that these two species share the sex pheromone (Z,Z)-11,13-hexa decadienal which female A. transitella use to attract males of their species. However, male P. farinalis are also attracted to this pheromone and will court and copulate with A. transitella females, but it is unlikely that offspring of these copulations would be viable.

== Interactions with humans ==
=== Pest of crop plants ===
Because of the meal moth's extensive appetite for cereals and grains, it is considered a pest by agriculturists. If grain is not stored properly, then a colony of meal moths can do considerable damage to the crop.

=== Agricultural use ===
One of the most surprising uses for P. farinalis is its use in producing "insect tea" in China. In China, the moth lives on the host plant of Litsea coreana and scientists have been studying optimum temperatures for which the moth is able to grow and develop best in the hopes of being able to cultivate the moths for insect tea.

== Bibliography ==
- Grabe, Albert (1942): Eigenartige Geschmacksrichtungen bei Kleinschmetterlingsraupen ["Strange tastes among micromoth caterpillars"]. Zeitschrift des Wiener Entomologen-Vereins 27: 105–109. (in German)
- Kimber, Ian (2010): UKMoths – Meal Moth. Retrieved 12 April 2010.
- Savela, Markku (2009): Markku Savela's Lepidoptera and Some Other Life Forms – Aglossa. Version of 25 April 2009. Retrieved 12 April 2010.
