= Trichophysetis preciosalis =

Scientific classification
- Kingdom: Animalia
- Phylum: Arthropoda
- Clade: Pancrustacea
- Class: Insecta
- Order: Lepidoptera
- Family: Crambidae
- Genus: Trichophysetis
- Species: T. preciosalis

Binomial name
- Trichophysetis preciosalis (Guillermet, 1996)

Synonyms
- Pyralis preciosalis Guillermet, 1996

Species of moth

Trichophysetis preciosalis is a moth in the family Crambidae. It is found on La Réunion. and Madagascar.
