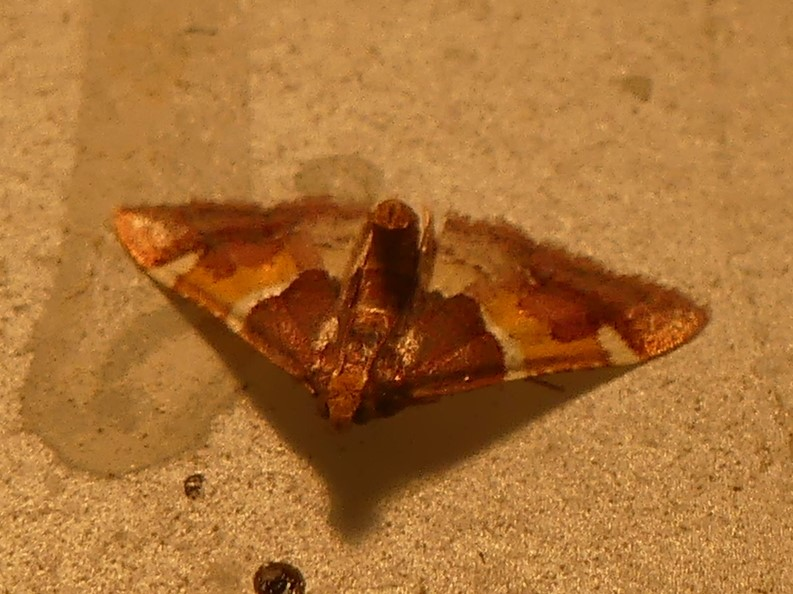

Scientific classification
- Kingdom: Animalia
- Phylum: Arthropoda
- Class: Insecta
- Order: Lepidoptera
- Family: Pyralidae
- Genus: Pyralis
- Species: P. kacheticalis

Binomial name
- Pyralis kacheticalis (Christoph, 1893)

Synonyms
- Asopia kacheticalis Christoph, 1893; Pyralis imperialis Caradja, 1916

= Pyralis kacheticalis =

Species of moth

Pyralis kacheticalis is a species of snout moth. It is found in Ukraine and on Cyprus, as well as in Turkey and Russia.

The wingspan is about 16–17 mm.
