= Panda tea =

Variety of tea

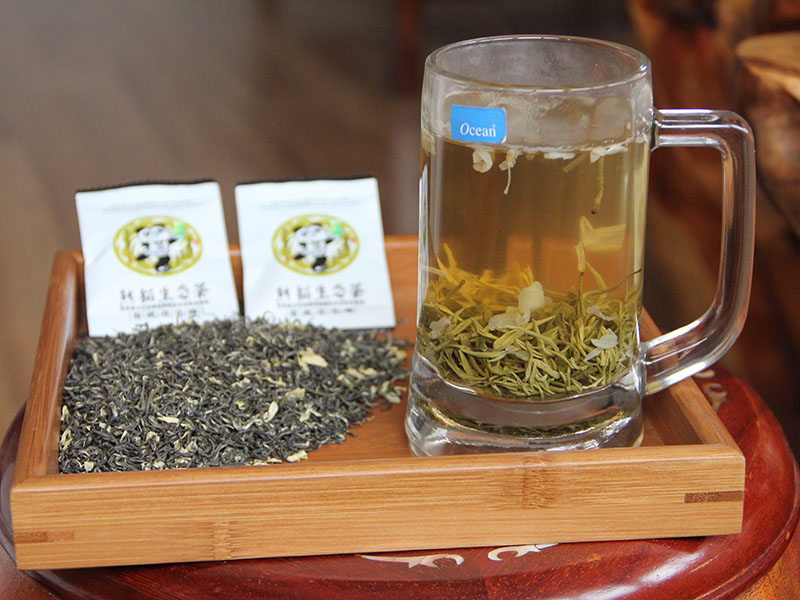
Panda tea

Panda tea (Chinese: 熊猫茶), or panda dung tea, produced in the Ya’an mountainous region of Sichuan, China, is a type of tea fertilized by the dung of pandas.

When it officially went on the market in April 2012, it was reputedly the world's most expensive tea with 50 grams (approximately 16 cups of tea) sold for $3,500 (£2,200), or about $200 (£130) a cup. An Yanshi, a local panda tea entrepreneur, argues that the tea is healthy, given that pandas only consume wild bamboo and absorb only about 30% of the nutrients, and that it encourages "the culture of recycling and using organic fertilizers."
