= List of organisms named after famous people (born 1925–1949) =

In biological nomenclature, organisms often receive scientific names that honor a person. A taxon (e.g., species or genus; plural: taxa) named in honor of another entity is an eponymous taxon, and names specifically honoring a person or persons are known as patronyms. Scientific names are generally formally published in peer-reviewed journal articles or larger monographs along with descriptions of the named taxa and ways to distinguish them from other taxa. Following rules of Latin grammar, species or subspecies names derived from a man's name often end in -i or -ii if named for an individual, and -orum if named for a group of men or mixed-sex group, such as a family. Similarly, those named for a woman often end in -ae, or -arum for two or more women.

This list is part of the List of organisms named after famous people, and includes organisms named after famous individuals born between 1 January 1925 and 31 December 1949. It also includes ensembles (including bands and comedy troupes) in which at least one member was born within those dates; but excludes companies, institutions, ethnic groups or nationalities, and populated places. It does not include organisms named for fictional entities, for biologists, paleontologists or other natural scientists, (Note: Entomologist Terry Erwin, for instance, has over 50 eponymous organisms.) nor for associates or family members of researchers who are not otherwise notable; exceptions are made, however, for natural scientists who are much more famous for other aspects of their lives, such as, for example, Japanese emperor Akihito.

Sir David Attenborough was formerly included in this section of the list as one of these exceptions, since despite his formal training as a natural scientist, he is more widely known to the public as a documentary filmmaker. However, due to the high number of taxa named after him (over 50 as of 2022), he has been removed; his patronyms can be found in the List of things named after David Attenborough and his works.

Organisms named after famous people born earlier than 1925 can be found in:

- List of organisms named after famous people (born before 1800)
- List of organisms named after famous people (born 1800–1899)
- List of organisms named after famous people (born 1900–1924)

Organisms named after famous people born later than 1949 can be found in:

- List of organisms named after famous people (born 1950–1974)
- List of organisms named after famous people (born 1975–present)

The scientific names are given as originally described (their basionyms): subsequent research may have placed species in different genera, or rendered them taxonomic synonyms of previously described taxa. Some of these names may be unavailable in the zoological sense or illegitimate in the botanical sense due to senior homonyms already having the same name.

== List (people born 1925–1949) ==
Yellow background shading indicates that this taxon name has been subsequently modified (e.g. species transferred to a different genus), but the eponymy is still valid
Pink background shading indicates that this taxon name is invalid because of homonymy, or has been synonymised and is no longer in use, or is considered a nomen dubium

Taxon	Type	Namesake	Notes	Taxon image	Namesake image	Ref
Abba Castanheira & Framenau, 2023	Spider	ABBA	A genus of Australian orb-weaving spiders whose name "honours the Swedish pop group ABBA whose songs and subsequent musicals Mamma Mia! (2008) and Mamma Mia! Here We Go Again (2018), provided hours of entertainment for the authors."			
Abyssocladia hendrixii Eck, Kröner & Janussen, 2024	Sponge	Jimi Hendrix	"Named after the famous guitarist, songwriter and singer Jimi Hendrix, whose music was a faithful companion throughout the time of the taxonomic work."			
Acalypha rabesahalana I.Montero & Cardiel	Flowering plant	Gisèle Rabesahala	A species of copperleaf enedemic to Madagascar, whose name "honors Gisèle Rabesahala (1929–2011), Malagasy politician and activist who was the first woman to hold a ministerial position in the government of Madagascar. She fought for her country's independence and human rights"			
Acanthophis hawkei Wells & Wellington, 1985	Snake	Bob Hawke	An Australian death adder "Named for the Prime Minister of Australia, the Rt. Hon. Robert J. Hawke, in recognition of his part in saving the Tasmanian wilderness." This species was described in one of the papers involved in the Wells and Wellington affair and is one of the few from those papers that is accepted as valid by the scientific community and has not been synonymised. In turn, a military vehicle of the Australian Army, the Hawkei PMV, is named after this species.			
Acidovorax kalamii Pal et al., 2018	Bacterium	A. P. J. Abdul Kalam	Isolated from the river Ganges in India.			
Acritus bikoi Gomy, 2001	Beetle	Steve Biko	A clown beetle native to South Africa.			
Acrogonyleptes cheguevarai DaSilva & Pinto-da-Rocha, 2010	Harvestman	Che Guevara	"In honor of Che Guevara (1928–1967), the famous Argentine socialist revolutionary, who undertook the battle for the people's freedom in Latin America and Africa."			
Acronia paulsi Barševskis, 2022	Beetle	Raimonds Pauls	"This species is named after the famous contemporary Latvian composer Raimonds Pauls, in gratitude for his invaluable contribution to Latvian culture and to the development of popular music in Latvia."			
Acronia streicsi Barševskis, 2016	Beetle	Jānis Streičs	"This species is named after the prominent Latvian film director and producer, honorary member of Latvian Academy of Sciences, active supporter and patron of Daugavpils University [where the author works], Jānis Streičs, in great respect, gratitude and due to his 80-year birthday."			
Acronia teterevi Barševskis, 2016	Beetle	Boriss Teterevs and Ināra Tetereva	"The species is named after the outstanding Latvian philanthropists Ināra and Boris Teterev who financially supported the Latvian science, culture, art and education, including my studies in beetles systematics."			
Acropora sirikitiae Wallace, Phongsuwan & Muir, 2012	Coral	Sirikit	A stony coral found on the coast of Thailand, "named to honour the 80th year of Her Majesty Queen Regent of Thailand, Somdetch Phra Nang Chao Sirikit Phra Baromma Rajini Nath, who has supported biodiversity and conservation of Thailand's reef, and improved the lives of poor fishermen of Thailand, by her restoration project providing artificial reefs in Thai waters."			
Acteon boteroi Á. Valdés, 2008	Sea snail	Fernando Botero	"Dedicated to the Colombian artist Fernando Botero, whose paintings and sculptures represent rotund men, women, animals and still lifes. The rounded shape of the shell of "Acteon" boteroi evokes Botero's likely portrayal of a species of Acteonidae."; This species was originally described as an "Acteon", with the genus placed in quotation marks to show a degree of uncertainty, because the genus in Acteonidae can only be fully determined by the morphology of the radula, which was not available to the author. In the intervening time, no further research has contradicted this positioning, so the species is accepted to all extents and purposes as a member of Acteon.			
Actinopus dioi Miglio, Pérez-Miles & Bonaldo, 2020	Spider	Ronnie James Dio	"The specific name is in honor of musician Ronald James Padavona or Ronnie James Dio, one of Black Sabbath vocals, affiliated to several bands of heavy metal in addition to his solo career."			
Actinopus osbournei Miglio, Pérez-Miles & Bonaldo, 2020	Spider	Ozzy Osbourne	"The specific name is in honor of musician John Michael Osbourne or Ozzy Osbourne, the founder of heavy metal, affiliated to a band called Black Sabbath, in addition to his solo career."			
Adaina jobimi Vargas, 2020	Moth	Antônio Carlos Jobim	"dedicated to the memory of the great Brazilian musician Antônio Carlos Brasileiro de Almeida Jobim, best known as Tom Jobim, for his huge contribution to the development of the "Música Popular Brasileira" and his admiration of nature".			
Adenomera chicomendesi Carvalho et al., 2019	Frog	Chico Mendes	"named after Francisco Alves Mendes Filho, better known as Chico Mendes, in recognition of his efforts and sacrifice as an environmentalist in the Amazon rain forest, especially in the Brazilian state of Acre, his homeland [where the type locality is]. He also fought for the human rights of indigenous peoples and rubber tapper communities of the region. As a consequence of his activism, Chico Mendes was assassinated on 22 December 1988 in his hometown of Xapuri, in Acre."			
Adoretus kennedyi Limbourg, Dekoninck & Seidel, 2024	Beetle	Robert F. Kennedy	"Dedicated to the late Robert F. Kennedy for his civil rights position"			
Adoretus scotti Limbourg, Dekoninck & Seidel, 2024	Beetle	Bon Scott	"Dedicated to the late Ronald Belford "Bon" Scott (1946–1980), lead vocalist and lyricist of the AC/DC hard rock band."			
Aegires evorae Moro & Ortea, 2015	Sea slug	Cesária Évora	A species native to the waters of Cape Verde "Named after Cesárea [sic] Évora, the queen of morna, universal interpreter of Cape Verdean music."			
Aegrotocatellus jaggeri † Adrain & Edgecombe, 1995	Trilobite	Mick Jagger	Perirehaedulus richardsi was named concurrently to honor fellow Rolling Stones member Keith Richards.			
Aegrotocatellus nankerphelgeorum † Adrain & Edgecombe, 1995	Trilobite	Nanker Phelge	Collective pseudonym used by members of The Rolling Stones.			
Aetana abadae Huber, 2015	Spider	Pacita Abad	A cellar spider from the Philippines, "Named for Philippine-born cosmopolitan artist Pacita Abad (1946–2004), famous for her vibrant, colorful abstract work, but also for her paintings of tropical flowers and animal wildlife."			
Aetana kiukoki Huber, 2015	Spider	Ang Kiukok	A cellar spider from the Philippines.			
Afghanella tereshkovae † Leven, 1967	Protist	Valentina Tereshkova	A fossil foraminiferan found in Permian deposits throughout Eurasia, described from a holotype collected from the Pamir Mountains in Tajikistan (formerly part of the Soviet Union).			
Agathidium bushi Miller & Wheeler, 2005	Beetle	George W. Bush	These beetles were named by Quentin D. Wheeler, and President Bush was pleased with the gesture, even calling Wheeler to thank him for the honor. Because of the problematic public image of Bush and his cabinet, and the fact that these are round fungus beetles which feed on decaying fungi, some interpreted the naming to be intended as an insult; however, Wheeler clarified that they were meant as homages: "We admire these leaders as fellow citizens who have the courage of their convictions and are willing to do the very difficult and unpopular work of living up to principles of freedom and democracy rather than accepting the expedient or popular". Co-author Kelly Miller said "We intended the names to be honorific... We were two conservatives in academia working together (which is not common). It was early in the Iraq war period, and we were both in favor of intervention there... And finally, we love our beetles! We wouldn't name a new species after someone we didn't like. [In interviews,] we compared it to the Lewis and Clark expedition naming the three forks of the Missouri after Jefferson, Madison, and Gallatin (President, Vice President, and Secretary of the Treasury [at the time])."			
Agathidium cheneyi Miller & Wheeler, 2005	Beetle	Dick Cheney				
Agathidium rumsfeldi Miller & Wheeler, 2005	Beetle	Donald Rumsfeld				
Agmasoma aquinoae Enriquez & Sprague, 1988	Fungus	Corazon Aquino	This species of marine microsporidium was first identified in the Philippines. It is a parasite of prawns of the genus Penaeus.			
Agra schwarzeneggeri Erwin, 2002	Beetle	Arnold Schwarzenegger	Named "in reference to the markedly developed (biceps-like) middle femora of the males of this species reminiscent of the actor's physique."			
Agrilus updikei Hespenheide, 2012	Beetle	John Updike	A species of jewel beetle that mimics flies, "named in honor of the late writer John Updike. Although Updike published sparingly on Neotropical beetles (1963), his use of metaphors, widely admired by critics, recommends this honor because, in a sense, a species which mimics another is a kind of metaphor for the mimicked species and benefits by being confused for its model by uncritical predators."			
Agroecotettix turneri Hill, 2024	Grasshopper	Ted Turner	"honoring Robert Edward "Ted" Turner III, an American media mogul and philanthropist renowned for his extensive contributions to environmental conservation. Turner, the founder of CNN and a major philanthropist, has been instrumental in numerous initiatives aimed at protecting the environment and biodiversity. His establishment of the Turner Endangered Species Fund and his efforts in large-scale land conservation have provided critical support for the preservation of diverse ecosystems, including those that likely sustain a great diversity of grasshopper species."			
Akihito Watson, Keith, & Marquet, 2007	Fish	Akihito	A freshwater goby endemic to Vanuatu. "The new genus name honors Emperor Akihito for his many contributions to goby systematics and phylogenetic research"			
Aleiodes niveni Butcher et al., 2012	Wasp	Larry Niven				
Allobates algorei Barrio-Amorós & Santos, 2009	Frog	Al Gore	"We name this species after the former American vice-president and Nobel Peace Laureate Al Gore to recognize his ecumenical efforts to alert the people of the planet about the global warming crisis. Amphibians are among the organisms most affected by this crisis, even without direct prosecution by humans. Concretely, the Andes of Venezuela [where this species is native from] have suffered an evident decimation of amphibian populations due to known and unknown causes."			
Allocybaeina littlewalteri Bennett, 2020	Spider	Little Walter	"The specific epithet is a patronym honouring the late musician "Little" Walter Jacobs whose ground-breaking approach to blues harmonica in the 1950s and 1960s set the standards for all subsequent players".			
Amaurotoma zappa † Plas, 1972	Snail	Frank Zappa	A fossil species from the Permian of Nevada, USA			
Amblyseius suassunai Demite, Silva & Lofego, 2025	Mite	Ariano Suassuna	"a tribute to the Brazilian writer Ariano Suassuna (1927-2014), whose works portray with excellence the region of northeastern Brazil, where the species was found."			
Ami bladesi Pérez-Miles, Gabriel & Gallon, 2008	Spider	Rubén Blades	This species was described from a specimen collected in Colón Island, Panama. Subsequently synonymised with Neischnocolus panamanus Petrunkevitch, 1925.			
Anacroneuria carole Stark, 2004	Stonefly	Carole King	"The species name [...] honors singer, songwriter, environmental advocate, Carole King in recognition of the music career, a pearl by any standard." (This species belongs to the family Perlidae)			
Anacroneuria taylori Stark, 2004	Stonefly	James Taylor	"The patronym honors singer, songwriter James Taylor in appreciation of his attention to environmental causes, particularly those in the rainforests of South America where Anacroneuria occurs."			
Anansus kamwai Huber, 2014	Spider	Daniel Kamwa	A cellar spider species native to Cameroon, "Named for Cameroonian filmmaker Daniel Kamwa (born 1943), director of the 1981 film Notre Fille."			
Anaulacomera marshae Fianco, 2021	Katydid	Marsha P. Johnson	"The specific name honours Marsha P. Johnson [...], a black trans woman activist, who led the LGBTQI+ liberation movements that started in June of 1969, in the United States of America, and then spread across the world."			
Andinopanurgus vargasllosai Gonzalez and Alvarado, 2019	Bee	Mario Vargas Llosa	A species from Peru, whose name "honors the Peruvian writer, politician, journalist, and 2010 Nobel laureate Jorge Mario Pedro Vargas Llosa."; Subsequently transferred to genus Luisanthrena.			
Andrena perahia Pisanty & Schechl, 2016	Bee	Murray Perahia				
Anelosimus pratchetti Agnarsson, 2012	Spider	Terry Pratchett	"in honour of Sir Terence David John "Terry" Pratchett, the wonderful writer "sometimes accused of literacy", a comic genius and the creator of the Discworld series."			
Anheteromeyenia cheguevarai Manconi & Pronzato, 2005	Sponge	Che Guevara	A freshwater demosponge native to Cuba.			
Anomala arkhipovi Limbourg, Dekoninck & Seidel, 2024	Beetle	Vasily Arkhipov	"Dedicated to the Soviet Navy Officer Vasili Alexandrovich Arkhipov (1926-1998), credited with preventing a Soviet nuclear strike during the Cuban Missile Crisis (1962)."			
Anomphalus jaggerius † Plas, 1972	Sea snail	Mick Jagger	A fossil species from the Permian of Nevada, USA			
Anthrenocerus schwarzeneggeri Roach, 2000	Beetle	Arnold Schwarzenegger	"named in admiration after Mr Arnold Schwarzenegger, a multi-champion body builder, movie star, and businessman, because of their similarities in pleural development."			
Aphanogmus kretschmanni Moser, 2023	Wasp	Winfried Kretschmann	"The specific name is a patronym for Winfried Kretschmann, the current Minister-President of the state of Baden-Württemberg (Germany) [where the specimens were collected], to honour his scientific curiosity and commitment to preserving biodiversity in his political environment."			
Aphanogmus morriconei Salden & Peters, 2023	Wasp	Ennio Morricone	"The species is named in honour of the composer and trumpeter Ennio Morricone who died during the completion of this monograph. He was certainly an inspiration for the first author to learn to play the trumpet and to get into deeper contact with orchestral music."			
Aphanogmus nehbergi Salden & Peters, 2023	Wasp	Rüdiger Nehberg	"The species is named in honour of the survival expert and human rights activist Rüdiger Nehberg (1935–2020). In addition to his breathtaking and inspiring adventures, he has also campaigned for the protection of indigenous peoples and the fight against female genital mutilation."			
Aphantochilus rainbow Díaz-Guevara, Troya & Domínguez-Trujillo, 2026	Spider	Rainbow	"The specific epithet is dedicated to the English rock band Rainbow, one of the most successful bands of the 1970s, and also refers to the iridescent colouration of the species."			
Aphonopelma hollyi Smith, 1995	Spider	Buddy Holly	Discovered in Lubbock, Texas, birthplace of Holly. The holotype has been lost and no neotype specimen has been found, so this is now considered a nomen dubium, possibly a synonym of Aphonopelma hentzi.			
Aphonopelma johnnycashi Hamilton, Hendrixson, & Bond, 2016	Spider	Johnny Cash	"This species can be found near the area of Folsom Prison in California, and like Cash's distinctive style of dress... mature males of this species are generally black in color."			
Apistogramma mendezi Römer, 1994	Fish	Chico Mendes				
Aptostichus chavezi Bond, 2012	Spider	César Chávez				
Aptostichus edwardabbeyi Bond, 2012	Spider	Edward Abbey				
Arenivaga haringtoni Hopkins, 2014	Cockroach	Donald Harington (writer)	"This species is named in honor of Donald Harington, author of The Cockroaches of Stay More, a priceless novel about wonderful animals."			
Arenivaga pratchetti Hopkins, 2014	Cockroach	Terry Pratchett	"This species is named for the one and only Terry Pratchett, creator of Disc World and many happy hours of reading. May the strength and durability of these creatures I so love impart those gifts to him in full measure in his fight against Alzheimer's."			
Argyreia sharadchandrajii Lawand & Shimpale	Flowering plant	Sharad Pawar	A species of morning glory native to Maharashtra, India (Pawar's home state); "The specific epithet sharadchandrajii is chosen after Shri. Sharadchandraji Pawar, former Union Minister of Agriculture, Government of India, New Delhi for his valuable contribution to Indian agriculture."			
Argyrogrammana chicomendesi Gallard, 1995	Butterfly	Chico Mendes				
Arianops clintoni Carlton, 2008	Beetle	Bill Clinton				
Arianops gorei Carlton, 2008	Beetle	Al Gore	A species of rove beetle found only in Tennessee, "named after Al Gore, Tennessee native, former Vice President of the United States of America, Nobel Prize laureate, and champion of environmental causes."			
Aricidea bbkingi Barroso, Paiva & Ranauro, 2020	Polychaete worm	B.B. King	"named after Riley Ben King, known as B. B. King, which means Blues Boy King, one of the best guitar players that ever played, and who the authors very much admire. B.B. King played almost until the end of his life. He passed away in 2015, at the age of 90. We are very grateful to this man for all the wonderful songs and guitar solos."			
Arisemus cardenali Ježek, Oboňa, Maes & Pont, 2026	Fly	Ernesto Cardenal	A moth fly native to Nicaragua, "dedicated to Ernesto Cardenal Martínez [...]. Known for [being a] Nicaraguan cultural figure: a Nicaraguan Catholic priest, poet and politician. He was a liberation theologian and the founder of the primitivist art community in the Solentiname Islands."			
Arnapa Huber, 2019	Spider	Arnold Ap	A genus of cellar spiders native to West Papua.			
Arthronema gygaxiana Casamatta & Johansen, 2005	Cyanobacterium	Gary Gygax	"Named in honor of Gary Gygax, whose creative contributions enriched the lives of both authors of this species." Subsequently transferred to genus Pseudanabaena.			
Aryalidonta itishreea Subedi & Kasalo, 2023	Groundhopper	Bhairav Aryal	A new genus and species native to Nepal; "The genus is named in honor of the late Bhairav Aryal (Nepali: भैरव अर्याल), an iconic satirist of Nepali literature popularly known as the Emperor of Laughter (Nepali: हाँस्य सम्राट). The second part of the name, -donta, derives from the Greek word "ὀδών", meaning "tooth", and is a reference to Bhairav Aryal's iconic smile." "The specific epithet is derived from the Nepali word "itishree", which is the title of one of Bhairav Aryal's books and translates to "The End". The name is also a reference to the tragic end of Bhairav Aryal's life, as well as to his unyielding belief that an end is an invitation to a new beginning."			
Aspidolobus sebastianpinerai Vidal, 2018	Beetle	Sebastián Piñera	A darkling beetle native to Chile and "dedicated to the President of the Republic of Chile, Mr. Sebastián Piñera Echenique, for his great contribution to the development of the country."			
Asteriomyzostomum monroeae Jimi, Moritaki & Kajihara, 2017	Polychaete worm	Marilyn Monroe	"named after the American actress Marilyn Monroe. The protruded mouth in the new species is reminiscent of her puckered lips."			
Astyanax chico Casciotta & Almirón, 2004	Fish	Chico Mendes	A freshwater fish native to the San Francisco river basin in northern Argentina. Subsequently transferred to genus Psalidodon.			
Autosilis annisettaekoppelae † Fanti & Damgaard, 2018	Beetle	Annisette Koppel	A fossil soldier beetle found in Eocene Baltic amber, "named in honour of the Danish singer Annisette Koppel (born Hansen), in recognition of her long career."			
Avahi cleesei Thalmann & Geissmann, 2005	Lemur	John Cleese	"Named in honor of British actor and comedian John Cleese for his promotion of conservation issues in movies such as Fierce Creatures [ Schepisi & Young, 1997] and documentaries such as Born to be Wild: Operation Lemur With John Cleese [Kershaw & Cleese, 1999]."; Cleese said: "I was really touched, and indeed, honoured when Urs Thalmann told me they would like to name the lemur after me. I'm absurdly fond of the little creatures, and if I had to show any of my programmes to St Peter, upon my arrival at the Pearly Gates, I think I would show him my documentary made about them in Madagascar. I help with conservation a bit, here and there, and so will re-double my efforts for our furry friends."			
Avalanchurus simoni † Adrain & Edgecombe, 1997	Trilobite	Paul Simon				
Avalanchurus garfunkeli † Adrain & Edgecombe, 1997	Trilobite	Art Garfunkel				
Ayacucho glauberrochai Benedetti & Pinto-da-Rocha, 2022	Harvestman	Glauber Rocha				
Ayacucho spielbergi Benedetti & Pinto-da-Rocha, 2022	Harvestman	Steven Spielberg				
Ayacucho vargasllosai Benedetti & Pinto-da-Rocha, 2022	Harvestman	Mario Vargas Llosa	A species native to Peru, "dedicated to the Peruvian writer, politician, journalist, essayist, filmmaker, college professor and Nobel Prize winner Jorge Mario Pedro Vargas Llosa (born 1936)"			
Azlania Mohamedsaid, 1996	Beetle	Azlan Shah of Perak	"The new genus, Azlania, is named after the Sultan of Perak, Raja Azlan, the Patron of the MNS-Belum Scientific Expedition, 1993-1994. During the Expedition a number of Azlania costatipennis specimens were collected."			
Bacillus saganii Seuylemezian et al., 2020	Bacterium	Carl Sagan	This bacterium was isolated from the vehicle assembly building at Kennedy Space Center where the Viking spacecraft were assembled, and named "referring to Carl Sagan, a well-known American astrophysicist with experiments on the Viking mission landers." Subsequently transferred to genus Peribacillus.			
Baeus tejaswii Veenakumari, 2020	Wasp	Poornachandra Tejaswi	This species is native to India.			
Balmaceda abba Edwards & Baert, 2018	Spider	ABBA	A jumping spider from the Galápagos Islands.			
Bamberotanais blackmorei Głuchowska & Błażewicz, 2026	Crustacean	Ritchie Blackmore	"The species is named after Ritchie Blackmore, guitarist of Deep Purple and Rainbow, in recognition of his influential role in rock music history."			
Bamberotanais claptoni Głuchowska & Błażewicz, 2026	Crustacean	Eric Clapton	"The species is named after Eric Clapton, British guitarist and songwriter, in recognition of his influential legacy in blues and rock music."			
Bamberotanais hendrixi Głuchowska & Błażewicz, 2026	Crustacean	Jimi Hendrix	"The species is named after Jimi Hendrix, an American guitarist and singer-songwriter, in recognition of his groundbreaking contributions to modern music."			
Bamberotanais pagei Głuchowska & Błażewicz, 2026	Crustacean	Jimmy Page	"The species is named after Jimmy Page, British guitarist and founder of Led Zeppelin, in recognition of his lasting impact on rock music."			
Barbaturex morrisoni † Head et al., 2013	Lizard	Jim Morrison	An extinct genus of lizards from the Eocene of Myanmar, whose name "honors Jim Morrison, vocalist and lizard king".			
Barsine sirikitae Volynkin & Černý, 2018	Moth	Sirikit	"dedicated to Sirikit, the queen mother of Thailand, because the holotype and the part of paratypes [sic] were collected near the Queen Sirikit Botanic Garden in Chiang Mai Province of Thailand."; Subsequently transferred to genus Fossia.			
Baru darrowi † Wilis, Murray & Megirian, 1990	Crocodile	Paul Darrow	A fossil crocodile from the Miocene of Australia. "The specific name honours British actor Paul Darrow, best known for his role in the television series Blake's Seven, in recognition of his support of continuing palaeontological investigations of the Riversleigh deposits."			
Bathyceradocus hawkingi Jażdżewska & Ziemkiewicz, 2019	Crustacean	Stephen Hawking	"named to commemorate Professor Stephen Hawking [...], in appreciation of his great contribution to the popularisation of natural sciences, and to underline that the deep sea is as poorly known as the cosmos."			
Batillipes kalami Vishnudattan, Rubal & Bijoy Nandan, 2023	Tardigrade	A. P. J. Abdul Kalam	"The specific epithet, kalami refers to Dr. A. P. J. Abdul Kalam, Indian aerospace scientist and eleventh president of India, also known as the "Missile Man of India", who was native to the type locality of the current species".			
Beardius dioi Pinho, Mendes & Andersen, 2013	Fly	Ronnie James Dio	"Named after the late Ronnie James Dio, according to the senior author the greatest rock singer of all times."			
Beksitanais Jakiel, Palero & Błażewicz, 2019	Crustacean	Zdzisław Beksiński	A genus of deep-sea tanaids found in the Clipperton fracture zone of the Pacific Ocean, which was described by scientists of the University of Łódź, Poland.			
Bembidion brownorum Maddison, Sproul & Will, 2023	Beetle	Jerry Brown and Anne Gust Brown	"The specific epithet [...] refers to Jerry and Anne Brown, former Governor and First Lady of California, respectively. The name is formed in their honor as it was their hospitality and openness to allowing access for research of insects on their ranch, the type locality, which led to the discovery of this species. Additionally, this honors their long commitment to environmentalism and continued efforts in the international climate-change movement."			
Biancolina suassunai Andrade & Souza-Filho, 2022	Crustacean	Ariano Suassuna	An amphipod described from specimens collected from the coast of Pernambuco, Brazil, named "in honor of the famous writer Ariano Vilar Suassuna for his efforts towards promoting and strengthening cultural awareness of the Northeast Brazilian region. Also, the first author was born on the same date as Ariano Suassuna (June 16th)."			
Bisticeratops froeseorum † Dalman et al., 2022	Dinosaur	Edgar Froese and Jerome Froese	A ceratopsian dinosaur from the Cretaceous of New Mexico, USA. "The specific epithet honors the late Edgar Froese, the founder of the instrumental music band Tangerine Dream, and his son Jerome Froese, the former member of Tangerine Dream and the founder and leader of the instrumental music band Loom."			
Bistriopelma peyoi Nicoletta et al., 2020	Spider	Peyo	"The specific epithet is a patronym in honor of the Belgian cartoonist Pierre Culliford (1928–1992), mostly known by his pseudonym 'Peyo', who created the comic strip The Smurfs. The type locality of this new species is located near the Pampachiri Stone Forest, which is known as Smurf's house because of the conical rock formations. Moreover, the prominent projection of the cephalic region of the male resembles the shape of the Smurfs' hats."			
Bituca miltoni Lima & Silveira, 2026	Firefly	Milton Nascimento	A firefly from Brazil. "The name of the genus is a proud tribute to the Brazilian singer Milton Nascimento, who turned 80 in 2022. The artist is also affectionately known as Bituca, a nickname he received as a child for "pouting" when contradicted [...] The specific epithet honors the Brazilian singer, composer, and multi-instrumentalist Milton Nascimento, recognized worldwide as one of the most influential and talented artists of Brazilian Popular Music."			
Bobmarleya Hilário & Cunha, 2008	Polychaete worm	Bob Marley	"The generic name is given as an allusion to the shape of the tentacular crown in which the tentacles largely resemble dreadlocks, a hairstyle popularised by the reggae singer and songwriter Bob Marley."			
Borboresthes vaclavhaveli Novák, 2014	Beetle	Václav Havel	This species was described by a Czech scientist.			
Borealarges calei † Adrain, 1994	Trilobite	John Cale	One of four species concurrently named in 1994 after the members of the 1965–1968 line-up of The Velvet Underground.			
Borealarges morrisoni † Adrain, 1994	Trilobite	Sterling Morrison	One of four species concurrently named in 1994 after the members of the 1965–1968 line-up of The Velvet Underground.			
Borealarges nicoae † Adrain, 2003	Trilobite	Nico	One of three species concurrently named in 2003 after members or collaborators of The Velvet Underground.			
Borealarges reedi † Adrain, 1994	Trilobite	Lou Reed	One of four species concurrently named in 1994 after the members of the 1965–1968 line-up of The Velvet Underground.			
Borealarges tuckerae † Adrain, 1994	Trilobite	Moe Tucker	One of four species concurrently named in 1994 after the members of the 1965–1968 line-up of The Velvet Underground.			
Borealarges warholi † Adrain, 2003	Trilobite	Andy Warhol	One of three species concurrently named in 2003 after members or collaborators of The Velvet Underground.			
Borealarges yulei † Adrain, 2003	Trilobite	Doug Yule	One of three species concurrently named in 2003 after members or collaborators of The Velvet Underground.			
Bowie Jäger, 2022	Spider	David Bowie	A genus of Asian and Australian wandering spiders "named after David Bowie (1947–2016) for the creative, innovative and unique kind of music he composed and performed." Jäger added: "On the occasion of David Bowie's 75th birthday, I wanted to commemorate this incomparable artist who left us much too early.[...] However, what matters most to me here is the idea of conservation: we only protect what we know – and an attractive name is much more likely to be remembered." Many species in the genus have been named after David Bowie albums and songs.			
Brachycephalus lulai Bornschein et al., 2025	Frog	Luiz Inácio Lula da Silva	"The specific epithet honors Luiz Inácio Lula da Silva, who has been elected President of Brazil on three occasions. Through this tribute, we seek to encourage the expansion of conservation initiatives focused on the Atlantic Forest as a whole, and on Brazil's highly endemic miniaturized frogs in particular."			
Brachystegus nikitini Nemkov, 2004	Wasp	Yuri Nikitin (author)	This Nepalese species was described by a Russian scientist and "is dedicated to the famous Russian writer and amateur of entomology Mr. Yu. A. Nikitin."			
Bradleya victorjarai † Bergue & Coimbra, 2023	Ostracod	Víctor Jara	A fossil species from the Miocene of Chile, named "In honor of the Chilean poet, singer, and political activist Victor Lidio Jara Martínez (1932–1973). A beautiful species for a respectful soul."			
Branchioperla ianstewarti † Sroka & Staniczek, 2019	Stonefly	Ian Stewart	A fossil species found in Burmese amber. "The naming [...] completes the "Rolling Stoneflies" [see also species in the genera Electroneuria, Lapisperla, Largusoperla and Petroperla]. It refers to Ian "Stu" Stewart, keyboard player and founding member of The Rolling Stones. Often referred to as "the 6th member of the Rolling Stones", he was removed from the official line-up already in 1963, but continued to work with the band until his sudden death in 1985."			
Branchiosyllis belchiori Nascimento, Fukuda & Paiva, 2019	Polychaete worm	Belchior (singer)	A necklace worm described from specimens collected from the coast of Brazil and "Named after Antônio Carlos Belchior (stage name Belchior), a remarkable Brazilian popular singer and songwriter [...] who has amazed and inspired generations with his talent, and who is the first author's favorite artist."			
Branchiosyllis gonzaguinhai Nascimento, Fukuda & Paiva, 2019	Polychaete worm	Gonzaguinha	A necklace worm described from specimens collected from the coast of Brazil and "Named after Luiz Gonzaga do Nascimento Júnior (stage name Gonzaguinha), a remarkable Brazilian popular songwriter and singer [...] who has amazed and inspired generations with his talent, especially for his artistic production during the last period of military dictatorship in Brazil."			
Brignolia carlmulleri Ranasinghe & Benjamin, 2016	Spider	Carl Muller	A goblin spider from Sri Lanka "Named for the Sri Lankan writer, poet and journalist Carl Muller, best known for his trilogy: The Jam Fruit Tree, Yakada Yaka and Once Upon A Tender Time."			
Brignolia ondaatjei Ranasinghe & Benjamin, 2016	Spider	Michael Ondaatje	A goblin spider from Sri Lanka "Named for Sri Lankan-born Canadian novelist and poet, Philip Michael Ondaatje, best known for The English Patient and our favorite Anil's Ghost." Ondaatje said "Well I am thrilled of course [...] I thought a small creek would be enough to have my name attached to or a lane like the one bp Nichol got. But the goblin spider of Sri Lanka certainly raises the bar."			
Brueelia robertrankini Gustafsson, Najer, Zhou & Bush, 2022	Louse	Robert Rankin	"The species name is in honor of the British author Robert Rankin [...], as a heartfelt thank-you for the many far-fetched books he has written. These have provided the first author with endless joy over the last decades; moreover, it is a fact well known to those who know it well that 2021 marks the 40th anniversary of Rankin as a published author. Thus, given the specific name of the host [Pycnonotus jocosus], an associated louse named Brueelia robertrankini sp. nov. seems apropos, if you know what we mean"			
Bugula bowiei Vieira, Winston & Fehlauer-Ale, 2012	Bryozoan	David Bowie	"Named after David Bowie, British popular musician (1947–) and third author's favourite artist." Subsequently transferred to genus Crisularia.			
Buitinga tingatingai Huber, 2003	Spider	Edward Tingatinga	A cellar spider from Tanzania, named "In honour of Edward Saidi Tingatinga (1932–72), a self-taught painter who established Tanzanian Tingatinga, a style of art which involves painting on masonite using bicycle paint."			
Bumba lennoni Pérez-Miles et al., 2014	Spider	John Lennon	"The specific name is patronymic in honor of John Winston Lennon (1940–1980), the legendary creator of The Beatles, who contributed to make this world a gentler place."			
Bushiella (Jugaria) beatlesi Rzhavsky, 1993	Polychaete worm	The Beatles	"named after the musical rock group 'The Beatles', whose songs were my early inspiration".			
Buthus delafuentei Teruel & Turiel, 2020	Scorpion	Félix Rodríguez de la Fuente	"a patronym honoring the great Spanish naturalist and documentary maker Félix Samuel Rodríguez de la Fuente [...], who tragically died in a plane crash on his 52nd birthday, while filming in Alaska. His wildlife documentaries inspired a complete generation of biologists (ours) to observe and eventually study nature. A crucial part of his work was devoted to Doñana National Park, just south [of] the site where this new species was discovered."			
Bythinella walensae Falniowski, Hofman & Rysiewska, 2016	Freshwater snail	Lech Wałęsa	This Greek species was described by scientists of Jagiellonian University and "Named in honour of President Lech Wałęsa, a Polish national hero and co-creator of our independence."			
Cacomorphocerus madseni † Fanti & Damgaard, 2018	Beetle	Svend Åge Madsen	A fossil soldier beetle found in Eocene Baltic amber, named "in honour of the Danish novelist Svend Åge Madsen, in recognition of his writings."			
Calponia harrisonfordi Platnick, 1993	Spider	Harrison Ford	"In honor of screen actor Harrison Ford, in recognition of his efforts on behalf of the American Museum."			
Capoeta shajariani Jouladeh-Roudbar et al., 2017	Fish	Mohammad-Reza Shajarian	A freshwater scraper fish found in the Gamasiab river (Tigris basin), Iran, "named [in] honor of Mohammad-Reza Shajarian, an acclaimed Iranian classical singer, composer and master of Persian traditional music."			
Carabus (Archiplectes) lennoni Gottwald, 1985	Beetle	John Lennon				
Carapoia djavani Huber, 2018	Spider	Djavan	A cellar spider from Brazil.			
Carapoia suassunai Huber, 2018	Spider	Ariano Suassuna	A cellar spider from Brazil.			
Carlomonnius † Bannikov & Carnevale, 2016	Fish	Carlo Monni	A fossil genus of gobiiform fish from the Eocene deposits of Monte Bolca, Italy.			
Carteronius lumumba Bonaldo & Ramírez, 2022	Spider	Patrice Lumumba	A corinnid sac spider from Central Africa.			
Cavilignum pratchettii † Siegert & Hermsen	Flowering plant	Terry Pratchett	A fossilized fruit from the Pliocene of Tennessee, USA, "named after deceased author Sir Terry Pratchett, who wrote numerous books and plays throughout his career that inspired millions. He taught us how to understand the world and our place in it, which is really what science is about. He told us that, in order to really see the world, you have to "[o]pen your eyes and then open your eyes again""			
Cedrorestes crichtoni † Gilpin et al., 2007	Dinosaur	Michael Crichton	"The species name honors Michael Crichton for promoting the public's interest in dinosaurs through his Jurassic Park novels."			
Cephalaeschna algorei Karube & Kompier, 2017	Dragonfly	Al Gore	"in recognition of [Mr. Gore's] important contribution to raise awareness of need for climate action, as exemplified by the award of the Nobel Peace Prize 2007, received jointly with the Intergovernmental Panel on Climate Change"			
Cephalonomia pinkfloydi Ward, 2013	Wasp	Pink Floyd	A bethylid wasp from New Zealand			
Ceraleurodicus brianeno Canty, 2023	Whitefly	Brian Eno	"named after the seminal musician, composer, producer, visual artist, and theorist, Brian Peter George St John Baptiste de la Salle Eno, who has pioneered, and played an important role in ambient, rock, pop, and electronic music."			
Ceraleurodicus wire Canty, 2023	Whitefly	Wire	"The species epithet [...] is the name of a seminal art-rock group, Wire, whose members have shown an interest in nature and natural history in their work."			
Ceraphron maathaiae Salden & Peters, 2023	Wasp	Wangarĩ Maathai	This species is native to Kenya and is "named in honour of the Kenyan activist Wangarĩ Muta Maathai (1940–2011) who founded the Green Belt Movement and won the Nobel Peace Prize as first African woman."			
Ceratophrys sagani † Barcelos, Almeida-Silva, Santos & Verdade, 2020	Frog	Carl Sagan	A fossil species of Pacman frog from the Pleistocene of Brazil, named "in honor of the eminent North American astronomer Carl Sagan (1934–1996), whose passion for the communication of science continues to inspire."			
Ceratozamia oliversacksii D.W.Stev., Mart.-Domínguez & Nic.-Mor.	Cycad	Oliver Sacks	"in memory of the distinguished neurologist and historian of science Oliver Sacks (1933–2015), who loved cycads and publicised them through a popular book, Island of the Color Blind and Cycad Island (Sacks 1997) and his love of Oaxaca [where the type locality is] as exemplified in his book, Oaxaca Journal, a book on the natural and cultural history of Southern Mexico with an emphasis on ferns."			
Cervellaea coheni Borovec & Meregalli, 2021	Weevil	Leonard Cohen	"During our 2016 expedition, the extraordinary artist Leonard Cohen (1934–2016) passed away, and we wish to name this species after him."			
Chaetodon (Blumchaetodon) wattsi † Marramà, Giusberti & Carnevale, 2022	Fish	Charlie Watts	A fossil butterflyfish from the Oligocene of Italy, "named after the British musician Charles Robert Watts, drummer of the Rolling Stones, who sadly passed away during the preparation of this paper."			
Cheguevaria Kazantsev, 2006	Firefly	Che Guevara	A genus native to Hispaniola and Puerto Rico, "named after E. "Che" Guevara, the legendary Latin American revolutionary, very popular in the Caribbean region."			
Chelidonura juancarlosi Ortea & Espinosa, 1998	Sea slug	Juan Carlos I	This species was described from specimens collected in Jardines de la Reina ("Gardens of the Queen") islands in Cuba, and named after Juan Carlos I to celebrate the visit of the King and Queen of Spain to Cuba arranged for the following year after publication (1999) (the first ever by Spanish monarchs). The sea snail species Volvarina sofiae, found in Jardines del Rey ("Gardens of the King"), was named concurrently after his wife Queen Sofía. Subsequently transferred to genus Camachoaglaja.			
Chespirito Ferreira, Keller & Branham, 2020	Firefly	Chespirito	A genus of nonbioluminescent fireflies native to Mexico, whose name "is a patronym to Roberto Gómez Bolaños (1929–2014), known by his stage name of Chespirito (little Shakespeare). Chespirito was of Mexican nationality, and a prolific screenwriter, comedian, actor and director, regarded as one of the most brilliant artists of his time"			
Chespiritos bolanosi Kuwahara & Marshall, 2020	Fly	Chespirito	A lesser dung fly from Mexico, named "in memory of Roberto Gómez Bolaños, Mexican screenwriter, actor, comedian and creator of the character Chespirito." (Genus Chespiritos, however, is not explicitly named after Bolaños; it had been created 20 years prior for a Costa Rican species, with no etymological information given; it was possibly named after a local restaurant chain, which was, in turn, named after him.)			
Chiromantes garfunkel Davie & Ng, 2013	Crustacean	Art Garfunkel	"Named for Art Garfunkel, who sang "Bright Eyes" for the soundtrack of the 1978 animated film Watership Down. Like the rabbit to which the song alludes, the new crab species also lives in holes, and is remarkable for its brightly shining eyes." Subsequently transferred to the genus Danarma.			
Choeras felixrodriguezi Fernández-Triana, 2020	Wasp	Félix Rodríguez de la Fuente				
Cichlidogyrus dibangoi Moons et al., 2023	Flatworm	Manu Dibango	A parasitic monogenean from Cameroon, whose name "honours Manu Dibango, a famous saxophonist and singer-songwriter from Cameroon, who incorporated jazz and traditional Cameroonian elements into his music."			
Cimrmaniela smoljaki † Frýda, Ferrová & Frýdová, 2013	Sea snail	Ladislav Smoljak	A fossil species from the Devonian of the Czech Republic, named "in honour of Ladislav Smoljak (1931–2010), one of the preeminent biographers of Jára" (referring to fictional Czech polymath Jára Cimrman, after whom the genus is named).			
Circoniscus mendesi López-Orozco, Campos-Filho & Bichuette, 2024	Crustacean	Chico Mendes	An isopod found in caves in the Amazon biome, "named after Francisco Alves Mendes Filho, popularly known as Chico Mendes, a rubber tapper and activist who gained an international reputation for the defense of the Amazonian biodiversity. Furthermore, the present name honors all workers of the ICMBio (in Portuguese, Instituto Chico Mendes de Conservação da Biodiversidade), who continue to keep alive Mendes' ideals."			
Cirolana mercuryi Bruce, 2003	Crustacean	Freddie Mercury	East African isopod found on coral reefs off Bawe Island, (Zanzibar, Tanzania) and named for "arguably Zanzibar's most famous popular musician and singer."			
Cis makebae Souza-Gonçalves & Lopes-Andrade, 2017	Beetle	Miriam Makeba	A minute tree-fungus beetle from South Africa, "named in honor of Zenzile Miriam Makeba (1932–2008), who is also known as "Mama Africa", a South African singer and a great activist defending human rights and against Apartheid."			
Cis masekelai Souza-Gonçalves & Lopes-Andrade, 2017	Beetle	Hugh Masekela	A minute tree-fungus beetle from South Africa, "named in honor of Hugh Ramopolo Masekela, a South African composer, musician and singer of jazz, whose songs protested slavery and Apartheid."			
Clavus brianmayi Fedosov & Puillandre, 2020	Sea snail	Brian May				
Clavus davidgilmouri Fedosov & Puillandre, 2020	Sea snail	David Gilmour				
Clusia goscinnyi J.E.Nascim. & Bittrich	Flowering plant	René Goscinny				
Coloborhynchus spielbergi † Veldmeijer, 2003	Pterosaur	Steven Spielberg	"in honour of Steven Spielberg, the director of the three Jurassic Park movies [sic; he directed the first two but not the third] in which dinosaurs and pterosaurs were animated." Subsequently transferred to genus Maaradactylus.			
Colomys lumumbai Kerbis Peterhans, Giarla & Demos, 2020	Rodent	Patrice Lumumba	"The specific epithet refers to Patrice Émery Lumumba, who was born on 2 July 1925 in Katako-Kombe, in the middle of the range of the new species. He was a Congolese politician and independence leader who served as the first Prime Minister of the newly independent Democratic Republic of the Congo from June until September 1960. He was one of the principal individuals involved in the independence of the DRC and he led the Congolese National Movement party from its founding in 1958. This movement was inclusive and not based on ethnic lines. On 17 January 1961, he was assassinated by Katangan and Belgian forces following an independence effort by the former group."			
Coltraneia † Lieberman & Kloc, 1997	Trilobite	John Coltrane	A genus of Devonian trilobites that has been found in Germany, France, Spain, Algeria and Morocco.			
Conchocarpus hendrixii Groppo, I.G.Costa & Bruniera	Flowering plant	Jimi Hendrix	"The epithet "hendrixii" is in honor of Jimi Hendrix, guitarist and singer-songwriter, who wrote the song "Purple Haze," in reference to the purple color of the flowers of the new species."			
Constrictoanchoratus lemmyi Ferreira, Rodrigues, Cunha & Domingues, 2017	Flatworm	Lemmy	"in honor of 'Lemmy' Kilmister (1945–2015), leader of the heavy-metal band Motörhead, of whom the senior author is a big fan."			
Conus cashi † Hendricks, 2015	Sea snail	Johnny Cash	A fossil species from the Neogene of the Dominican Republic.			
Conus gadesi Espinosa & Ortea, 2005	Sea snail	Antonio Gades	This species was described from specimens collected in Cuba. "With the name Conus gadesi, for this beautiful animal with a red body and a white shell, the authors wish to pay homage to the brilliant Spanish dancer and choreographer Antonio Gades, committed to Cuba, with whose sea he declared himself to be fervently in love." Subsequently synonymised with Conus regius.			
Copidosomyia abdulkalami Manickavasagam & Krishnachaitanya, 2016	Wasp	A. P. J. Abdul Kalam	A chalcid wasp from India "Named after the former President, Republic of India, Dr. A. P. J. Abdul Kalam, as this species description coincided with his sudden demise."			
Corambis jacknicholsoni Patoleta & Żabka, 2019	Spider	Jack Nicholson				
Corotoca hitchensi Zilberman, 2020	Beetle	Christopher Hitchens	"The name is after Christopher Hitchens, a really missed and remarkable intellectual who defended reason and freedom in an indefatigable and erudite way."			
Cortinarius jonimitchelliae H.Lindstr., Dima, Kytöv., Liimat. & Niskanen, 2016	Fungus	Joni Mitchell	"The epithet is in honor of the Canadian singersongwriter Joni Mitchell. She has written many songs for the protection of nature. Her most famous album "Blue" suits well for the color of this species".			
Corynopuntia guccinii D.Donati	Cactus	Francesco Guccini	"Dedicated to Francesco Guccini: I encountered the plant while listening to the song "Incontro", immediately realising that, more than any other succulent, it is "unforgiving and touching". I couldn't dedicate it to anyone else." Subsequently transferred to genus Grusonia.			
Cosmobunus sagani † Palencia et al., 2018	Harvestman	Carl Sagan	A fossil species from the Miocene of Spain, named "In memory of Carl Edward Sagan (1934–1996), creator of the award-winning television series Cosmos: A Personal Voyage, for his popularization of science that stimulated generations of school children and university students."			
Cremastus tutui Rousse & Van Noort, 2014	Wasp	Desmond Tutu	A species of parasitoid wasp endemic to South Africa. "Dedicated to Archbishop Desmond Tutu, one of four South Africans to have received the Nobel Peace prize, in acknowledgment of his lifelong fight for Human rights."			
Cretopiesma suukyiae † Grimaldi & Engel, 2008	True bug	Aung San Suu Kyi	A fossil species of flat bug found in Cretaceous Burmese amber, named "in honor of Aung San Suu Kyi from Burma, the 1991 laureate of the Nobel Peace Prize. Ms. Suu Kyi has spent 18 years [sic; actually 13 years at the time of publication] isolated in house confinement (from 1989–95, 2000–02, and 2003 to present [2008 at the time of publication; she would remain until 2010, and has been imprisoned again since February 2021]) for her promotion of democracy in Myanmar. It is fitting that a Burmese species, seemingly delicate but which has beautifully endured for so long, be named in her honor."			
Crichtonpelta † Arbour & Currie, 2015	Dinosaur	Michael Crichton	A new genus created for a Chinese ankylosaur originally designated as Crichtonsaurus benxiensis, after the authors considered Crichtonsaurus a nomen dubium. Crichtonpelta is named "after Michael Crichton, author of Jurassic Park, and pelta (Latin), a small shield, in reference to the osteoderms found on all ankylosaurs."			
Crichtonsaurus † Dong, 2002	Dinosaur	Michael Crichton	"The genus name is dedicated to the famous science fiction writer Michael Crichton, author of the novel Jurassic Park. The release of the movie Jurassic Park made dinosaurs a household animal and greatly promoted dinosaur research."			
Cricula aungsansuukyiae Naumann & Löffler, 2010	Moth	Aung San Suu Kyi				
Croton suassunae Y.Rossine & A.L.Melo	Flowering plant	Ariano Suassuna	A rushfoil native to the Northeast Region, Brazil, whose name "honors Ariano Villar Suassuna, a lawyer, playwright, novelist, essayist, poet, and teacher, born in Paraíba State, and who, throughout his life, valued and promoted the art and culture of northeastern Brazil."			
Cryptocercus garciai Burnside, Smith & Kambhampati, 1999	Cockroach	Jerry Garcia				
Cuspicephalus scarfi † Martill & Etches, 2013	Pterosaur	Gerald Scarfe	"After artist/cartoonist Gerald Scarfe whose vicious caricatures mostly have very pointy noses." The generic name Cuspicephalus is derived from cuspis, Latin for "point", after the animal's pointed rostrum, and Latinised Greek cephalus for "head".			
Cyclocosmia johndenveri Sherwood, Warhol & Bianco, 2025	Spider	John Denver	A trapdoor spider from West Virginia, USA, named "in honour of the American singer and songwriter John Denver (1943–1997), whose music has enriched the life of millions of people, including the first author."			
Cynohyaenodon smithae † Solé, Morlo, Schaal & Lehmann, 2021	Hyaenodont (an extinct order of mammals)	Patti Smith	A fossil hyaenodontid from the Eocene of France.			
Cyphochilus sansuukyii Sabatinelli, 2020	Beetle	Aung San Suu Kyi	"Aung San Suu Kyi is a Burmese politician, diplomat, author, and recipient of 1991 Nobel Peace Prize for her democratic activities in Myanmar, from where the new species of Cyphochilus is described."			
Cyphochilus tenzingyatsoi Sabatinelli, 2020	Beetle	Tenzin Gyatso, 14th Dalai Lama	"Jetsun Jamphel Ngawang Lobsang Yeshe Tenzin Gyatso, formally recognized as the 14th Dalai Lama, was the recipient of the 1989 Nobel Peace Prize for his activity in Tibet, from where the new species is described."			
Dalek nationi Noyes, 2023	Wasp	Terry Nation	"This species is named in honour of Terry Nation, creator of the Daleks, an alien species that has terrified children for the past 60 years." John S. Noyes, who described the genus, said, "I thought [Dalek] was a good name for a genus and a bit of fun having been a big fan of Doctor Who in my early years."			
Daviesia schwarzenegger Crisp & L.G.Cook	Legume	Arnold Schwarzenegger	A species of bitter pea from Australia. "Surprisingly, DNA sequence data showed D. benthamii subsp. humilis to comprise two cryptic species that are more closely related to other species than to D. benthamii [...]. As they are unexpected and unlikely 'twins', we have named them after the actors who played an unlikely pair of twins in the eponymous Hollywood movie: Arnold Schwarzenegger and Danny DeVito. We have named this species after Schwarzenegger because he is much more robust than his twin: 'The embryo did split in two, but it didn't split equally. All the purity and strength went into Julius [Schwarzenegger's character]'. This difference between the actors parallels the growth habit difference between the two Daviesia species. We also wish to honour Arnold Schwarzenegger's leadership (as governor of California) in pioneering the reduction of carbon emissions, and for advising the Australian government to do the same."			
Daviesia devito Crisp & L.G.Cook	Legume	Danny DeVito	A species of bitter pea from Australia. "The name refers to the actor playing the diminutive twin in the Universal Studios film Twins (1988). Daviesia devito is the less vigorous of two cryptic species into which we here divide D. benthamii subsp. humilis, in contrast to the much more robust D. schwarzenegger" [also in this list]			
Deltapliomera humphriesi † McAdams, Adrain & Karim, 2018	Trilobite	Barry Humphries				
Demanietta sirikit Naiyanetr, 1992	Crustacean	Sirikit	A freshwater crab native to Thailand, named "in honour of Her Majesty Queen Sirikit [on] the occasion of Her Majesty's 60th birthday, as a token of respect and recognition of the great interest shown by Her Majesty in the natural history and conservation of wildlife in Thailand. Her Majesty the Queen graciously permitted the use of Her name for this remarkably colourful and most interesting species." Subsequently transferred to genus Thaiphusa.			
Dendropsophus kubricki Rivadeneira, Venegas & Ron, 2018	Frog	Stanley Kubrick	"[Kubrick] is one of the most brilliant and influential film directors of all time. We dedicate this species to him for his legacy to film culture and science fiction."			
Dendropsophus ozzyi Orrico et al., 2014	Frog	Ozzy Osbourne	"The specific epithet [...] honors John Michael "Ozzy" Osbourne, a famous British rock singer, former vocalist of the rock band Black Sabbath, for its contribution to modern music and culture. Ozzy is commonly associated with bats because of the famous episode in which, on stage while he was performing a gig, he bit off a bat's head thrown by a fan. He later stated that he thought it was a plastic toy. When calling, this new Dendropsophus species can be vaguely associated with the high pitch sounds emitted by some bat species that are hearable to the human ear. When we heard this species in the field we immediately pictured a calling bat. Because of this "bat association" we take the opportunity to name this species after one of the biggest music legends of all time".			
Dendropsophus salli Jungfer, Reichle & Piskurek, 2010	Frog	John Sall	"The new species is named after John Sall for his continuous generous contributions to forest conservation worldwide and especially in the Neotropical region."			
Desis bobmarleyi Baehr et al., 2017	Spider	Bob Marley	"we describe a new intertidal species from tropical Queensland and name it after Bob Marley, whose song "High Tide or Low Tide" inspired us as it lives in a "high tide low tide" habitat". The common name "Bob Marley's Intertidal Spider" was proposed.			
Desmopachria chei Miller, 1999	Beetle	Che Guevara	A diving beetle from Bolivia, named "after the idealistic, violent revolutionist and communist Ernesto 'Ché' Guevara de la Serna (1928-1967). Guevara, with his guerrilla revolutionists, captured the post at Samaipata, Departmento Santa Cruz, Bolivia, near the type locality, marking one of his few successes in Bolivia, though at the time he was apparently in poor health and simply attempting to secure medicine. He was later executed by the Bolivian army and buried beneath the airstrip in Vallegrande, not far from Samaipata. 'Che,' the familiar Argentinian word for 'buddy' was his nickname."			
Desmopachria taniae Miller, 1999	Beetle	Tamara Bunke	A diving beetle from Bolivia, named "after the communist German-Argentinian, Haydee Tamara Bunke Bider, 'Tania la guerrillera.' Tania faught together with Ché Guevara and his men during their attempt to create revolution in Bolivia. She was killed in Bolivia, and her body was recently moved to Cuba."			
Dibango † Davesne & Carnevale, 2025	Fish	Manu Dibango	A monotypic genus of fossil fish from the Eocene Monte Bolca site in Italy, "Named in honour of the Cameroonian musician and singer Manu Dibango (1933–2020), for his work as an artist and cultural ambassador."			
Dichogaster garciai James, 2004	Earthworm	Jerry Garcia				
Dichogaster marleyi James, 2004	Earthworm	Bob Marley	This species is native to Jamaica.			
Dicrotendipes thanatogratus Epler, 1987	Fly	Grateful Dead	Thanatos is Greek for "death" and Gratus is Latin for "grateful".			
Dipteryx hermetopascoaliana C.S.Carvalho, H.C.Lima & D.B.O.S.Cardoso	Legume	Hermeto Pascoal	"The specific epithet honours the Brazilian musician and multi-instrumentalist Hermeto Pascoal born in Olho d'Água Grande, Alagoas, i.e. the state where the only known existing population of the new species has been located. Also known as the Wizard of Sound, Hermeto is renowned for his talent, creativity and ingenuity, as expressed in his way of creating musical arrangements from regular instruments or from a wide range of objects, including plant materials such as the stems of 'mamona' (Ricinus communis L.) and 'jerimum' (Curcubita sp. [sic]). Just like the great musician Hermeto, the new species D. hermetopascoaliana attracts much attention in being a huge forest emergent that has, so far, survived the relentless destruction of the AF."			
Disnyssus helenmirrenae Raven, 2015	Spider	Helen Mirren				
Disnyssus judidenchae Raven, 2015	Spider	Judi Dench				
Dokimocephalus blacki † Westrop, Waskiewicz Poole & Adrain, 2010	Trilobite	Lewis Black				
Dolecta rubtsovi Naydenov, Yakovlev, Penco & Sinyaev, 2020	Moth	Nikolay Rubtsov				
Dollyphyton † Retallack, 2019	Moss	Dolly Parton	A fossil genus from the Ordovician of Tennessee, USA. "The generic name is in honor of Dolly Parton, whose Dollywood resort is near Douglas Dam" (where the fossils were found)			
Dondice freddiemercuryi García-Méndez, Padula & Valdés, 2022	Sea slug	Freddie Mercury	"Named in honor of Freddie Mercury, British singer-songwriter, and lead vocalist of the rock band Queen. His talent and charismatic personality inspired [the lead author] during the long sampling journeys in the field and extensive days working at the laboratory. Moreover, the diamond-back pattern that this species exhibits resembles the iconic black-and-white harlequin design wore by Mercury in one of his performances."			
Doris juanformelli Ortea & Espinosa, 2017	Sea slug	Juan Formell	A species from Cuba named "in honour of Juan Formell (Havana, 1942–2014), a great bassist and composer who made the most of the expressive resources of son cubano, founding the group Los Van Van in 1969, true ambassadors of Cuban music, capable of making the broomsticks dance with songs like "El baile del buey cansao" or "La Titimanía". In 2013 he received a Latin Grammy Lifetime Achievement Award."			
Drepanoistodus iommii † Rasmussen, Eriksson & Lindskog, 2021	Fish	Tony Iommi	A fossil conodont from the Ordovician of Leningrad Oblast, Russia. "Named in honour of legendary guitarist Tony Iommi, founding member of heavy metal band Black Sabbath." Iommi jokingly said "It's a shock that a fossil has been named after me, and of course you can imagine my friends now, the sort of abuse I've got now!", and also stated he was proud and thanked Eriksson for the honour.			
Drepanosticta adenani Dow & Reels, 2018	Damselfly	Adenan Satem	A species identified in the Lanjak Entimau Wildlife Sanctuary (LEWS) in Sarawak, Malaysia, dedicated "to the late Tan Sri Adenan bin Satem (27 January 1944–11 January 2017), Chief Minister of Sarawak from 2014–2017, in recognition of his support for biodiversity research and conservation in Sarawak, and for starting the Research for Intensified Management of Bio-rich Areas (RIMBA) project, which includes LEWS."			
Drosophila vireni Bächli, Vilela & Haring, 2002	Fly	Lasse Virén	A fruit fly from Finland, "Named in honor of the Finnish runner, four times Olympic gold winner, Lasse Viren"			
Drypetes kalamii G. Krishna, Karthig., Arisdason & Chakrab	Flowering plant	A. P. J. Abdul Kalam	A tropical plant native to West Bengal, India, which "honours Dr. Avul Pakir Jainulabdeen Abdul Kalam (Dr. A.P.J. Abdul Kalam), the 11th President of [the] Republic of India, professor and aerospace scientist, for being an inspiration to the entire scientific community, especially the students and young researchers."			
Dudleya hendrixii S.McCabe & Dodero	Flowering plant	Jimi Hendrix	Discoverer Mark Dodero said to have been listening to Hendrix's "Voodoo Child" when he first saw it, near Colonet, Baja California, Mexico.			
Ecliptoides pepemujicai Da Silva Carli, Monné, Santos-Silva & Rafael, 2026	Beetle	José Mujica	"This species is named in honor of José Alberto "Pepe" Mujica Cordano (1935‑2025), an Uruguayan political leader admired worldwide for his simplicity and commitment to the most fundamental human values."			
Eidmanacris suassunai Souza-Dias, Campos & Nihei, 2015	Cricket	Ariano Suassuna	A Brazilian species "named in honor of the Brazilian writer Ariano Suassuna (1927–2014). Ariano wrote a famous Brazilian play entitled O Auto da Compadecida; the main character in this play is named "João Grilo" — "grilo" is the Brazilian common name for cricket."			
Eknomisis dalioi Watling & France, 2011	Coral	Ray Dalio	"This species is named in honor of Ray Dalio, for his dedicated service on the board of directors of the National Fish and Wildlife Foundation. Dalio is an accomplished entrepreneur and conservationist with a deep interest in the protection of the ocean. His investigative and analytical nature continues to lead his pursuits deeper into ocean abysses and toward the discovery of new ocean life."			
Electroneuria ronwoodi † Sroka, Staniczek & Kondratieff, 2018	Stonefly	Ronnie Wood	One of 2 genera and 7 species of fossil stoneflies found in Burmese amber, and named concurrently in 2018 after The Rolling Stones and its members on the occasion of Mick Jagger's 75th birthday (see also species in the genera Lapisperla, Largusoperla and Petroperla). "Burmese amber is one of the oldest resins with insect inclusions, and stoneflies are one of the oldest pterygote lineages. What lies closer at hand than to link fossil stoneflies in ancient stones with the Rolling Stones and to name the new species after the members of the oldest and greatest Rock 'n' Roll Band in the world. The [...] new family and genera are named after 'the Stones', and all present and former members of the Rolling Stones are honoured with their own species.[...] The name of this immature specimen refers to Ronnie Wood, guitar player of the Rolling Stones since 1975, and youngest member of the Rolling Stones."			
Elephantis jaggeri Klotz & De Grave, 2015	Crustacean	Mick Jagger	Replacement name for Elephantis natalensis (Bouvier, 1925) (formerly Caridina natalensis), a junior primary homonym of Caridina nilotica var. natalensis De Man, 1908. "The species name is dedicated to Mick Jagger, in reference to the Rolling Stones' song "(I Can't Get No) Satisfaction", to continue the innuendo laden etymology of Elephantis." (See Elephantis in the List of organisms named after famous people (born before 1800))			
Eleutherodactylus jorgevelosai Lynch, 1994	Frog	Jorge Velosa	A species from Colombia, which "takes the name of my friend and folklorist, Jorge Velosa Ruiz, whose music and poetry bring me so much pleasure". Another related species was concurrently named Eleutherodactylus carranguerorum, after Velosa's band Los Carrangueros. Both have been subsequently moved to the genus Pristimantis.			
Elysia jaramilloi Ortea, Moro & Bacallado, 2017	Sea slug	Julio Jaramillo	A species native to the Galápagos Islands, Ecuador, and named "In honour of the Ecuadorian musician Julio Jaramillo (1935–1978), the "Nightingale of America", whose songs accompanied us in the multipurpose room of the ships on our expeditions to the Galápagos, at first as a misfortune and at the end as a pleasure. In his memory, every October 1 is celebrated as the Day of the Ecuadorian Pasillo, a true festival of music, which we would like to join with this dedication to the Ecuadorian Nightingale."			
Episimus buarquei Brito & Vargas, 2017	Moth	Chico Buarque	"named in honor of the Brazilian Francisco Buarque de Hollanda, better known as Chico Buarque, for his amazing contribution to the development of the 'Música Popular Brasileira'."			
Eruga gutfreundi Gauld, 1991	Wasp	John Gutfreund				
Etheostoma clinton Mayden & Layman, 2012	Fish	Bill Clinton	The scientific name of the beaded darter, endemic to the upper Caddo and Ouachita Rivers in Arkansas, honors Arkansas native Clinton for "his lasting environmental accomplishments in creating and expanding national monuments, preserving millions of acres of wilderness areas, his leadership and commitment during challenging economic times, and his continued commitment to global humanitarian issues and needs and peace".			
Etheostoma gore Layman & Mayden, 2012	Fish	Al Gore	The scientific name of the Cumberland darter, endemic to the Cumberland River drainage in Kentucky and Tennessee, honors Tennessee native Gore for "his environmental vision, commitment, and accomplishments throughout decades of public service and his role in educating the public and raising awareness on the issue of global climate change".			
Etmopterus benchleyi Vásquez et al., 2015	Shark	Peter Benchley	"The species is named in honor of Peter Benchley, author of Jaws and subsequently an avid shark conservationist. His legacy, the Benchley Awards, recognizes outstanding achievements in ocean conservation. In line with Mr. Benchley's outreach efforts, the privilege of deciding a common name for this species was bestowed upon four young shark enthusiasts, ages 8 to 14, and relatives of the first author (VEV). The suggested common name, the Ninja Lanternshark, refers to the uniform black coloration and reduced photophore complement used as concealment in this species, somewhat reminiscent of the typical outfit and stealthy behavior of a Japanese ninja."			
Eucharis shajariani Lotfalizadeh & Ghafouri Moghaddam, 2022	Wasp	Mohammad-Reza Shajarian	A parasitoid of ants native to Iran, "named in honor of Mohammad-Reza Shajarian (1940–2020), an Iranian vocalist and the greatest maestro of Persian classical music. He has received several international awards and medals, including Golden Picasso, UNESCO Mozart, National Order of Merit, Grammy [sic; nomination only], French National Order of the Legion of Honor, Aga Khan Trust for Culture and one of US National Public Radio (NPR) great voices."			
Eupyrgops mitoraji Bramanti, Bramanti & Rukmane-Bārbale, 2020	Weevil	Igor Mitoraj	"in memory of the sculptor Igor Mitoraj (1944–2014), are [sic] genius and nature lover."			
Europatitan eastwoodi † Torcida Fernández-Baldor et al., 2017	Dinosaur	Clint Eastwood	A sauropod dinosaur from the Cretaceous of northern Castile and León, Spain, estimated to have been around 27 metres long. "Dedicated to US actor Clint Eastwood, the protagonist of the film The Good, the Bad and the Ugly, which was partially filmed near Salas de los Infantes." (where the fossil remains were found)			
Eurotherium mapplethorpei † Solé, Morlo, Schaal & Lehmann, 2021	Hyaenodont (an extinct order of mammals)	Robert Mapplethorpe	A fossil hyaenodontid from the Eocene of France.			
Eurypon suassunai Santos, França & Pinheiro, 2014	Sponge	Ariano Suassuna	A species from the Northeastern coast of Brazil, "named in honor of the Late the famous writer Ariano Vilar Suassuna for his defense of the culture of the Brazilian Northeast."			
Eurysyllis mercuryi Lucas, San Martín & Parapar, 2012	Polychaete worm	Freddie Mercury				
Euschoengastia gagarini Brennan, 1962	Mite	Yuri Gagarin	One of four species of chiggers named concurrently after the cosmonauts and astronauts who participated in the first four crewed orbital spaceflights in 1961 and 1962 (see also Whartonia). "Named for Maj. Yuri Gagarin, USSR, who made the first orbit of the earth in the Vostok I, 12 April 1961."			
Euschoengastia titovi Brennan, 1962	Mite	Gherman Titov	One of four species of chiggers named concurrently after the cosmonauts and astronauts who participated in the first four crewed orbital spaceflights in 1961 and 1962 (see also Whartonia). "Named for Maj. Gherman Titov, USSR, who in the Vostok II made 17 orbits of the earth, 6 August 1961."			
Evarcha brinki Haddad & Wesołowska, 2011	Spider	André Brink	This species is native to South Africa.			
Extraordinarius alicecooperi Rheims, 2022	Spider	Alice Cooper	"The species name honors Alice Cooper (Vincent Damon Furnier), an American singer and songwriter known for his very theatrical rock concerts"			
Extraordinarius klausmeinei Rheims, 2019	Spider	Klaus Meine	"The specific name honours Klaus Meine, German singer, songwriter, lead singer of the hard rock band Scorpions."			
Exyrias akihito Allen & Randall, 2005	Fish	Akihito	"in honour of the Emperor of Japan, in recognition of his significant contribution to our knowledge of gobiid systematics. Many of the type specimens of E. akihito were supplied by the Biological Laboratory of the Imperial Household in Tokyo."			
Facelinopsis pacodelucia Ortea, Moro & Caballer, 2014	Sea slug	Paco de Lucía	"As a heartfelt tribute to the "master of the guitar", a cultural reference of the 20th century, the brilliant Spanish guitarist Paco de Lucía, a native of Algeciras, Cádiz, in whose port is located the type locality of this singular species." Another species, found in Playa del Carmen, Mexico (where Paco de Lucía died), was concurrently named Elysia entredosaguas, after de Lucía's album Entre dos aguas.			
Flacillula naipauli Bopearachchi & Benjamin, 2021	Spider	V. S. Naipaul				
Forcepsioneura elizabethae Lencioni, 2022	Damselfly	Elizabeth II	"I named this species [...] after Her Majesty Elizabeth II the Queen of the United Kingdom (b. Elizabeth Alexandra Mary, London 21.iv.1926), on the occasion of the platinum jubilee."			
Frammia bachae † Adrain & Edgecombe, 1997	Trilobite	Barbara Bach	One of five species concurrently named in 1997 after people connected to The Beatles (See also Struszia).			
Frippia † Bannikov & Carnevale, 2012	Fish	Robert Fripp	A fossil genus of percoid fish from the Eocene deposits of Monte Bolca, Italy. "It is our pleasure to name this genus after the British musician and composer Robert Fripp in recognition of his outstanding musical and cultural work."			
Funastrum saganii M.G. Chávez, Lozada-Pérez & L.O. Alvarado	Flowering plant	Carl Sagan				
Funkotriplogynium iagobadius Seeman & Walter, 1997	Mite	James Brown	Iago is "James" and badius is "brown" in Latin.			
Galapa gabito Huber, 2024	Spider	Gabriel García Márquez	This species is native to Colombia, and its name "honors the Colombian novelist Gabriel García Márquez (1927–2014), considered one of the most significant authors of the 20th century and known affectionately as Gabo or Gabito in Latin America."			
Gammarus pinkfloydorum Andrade, Copilaș-Ciocianu, Mamos & Grabowski, 2026	Crustacean	Pink Floyd	"The species is named in honour of the iconic, psychedelic, and progressive rock band Pink Floyd, intended to express the long-standing passion of the last author of this paper and collector of the species to the music of the band. Just as Pink Floyd is renowned for their innovative, complex, and eclectic music, often complemented by sophisticated visual elements in their album art and concerts, the genus Gammarus exhibits remarkably intricate patterns and subtle differences in morphological features among its hundreds of species. The specific epithet was chosen to capture the complexity and remarkable nature of the new species' morphology, drawing a parallel to the multifaceted artistry of Pink Floyd's music. The name is a genitive plural, referring collectively to the members of the band."			
Ganaspidium didionae Buffington, 2010	Wasp	Joan Didion	The wasp's range includes deserts of the American Southwest, setting of several of Didion's works.			
Genlisea hawkingii Silva, Płachno, Carvalho & Miranda, 2020	Flowering plant	Stephen Hawking	A carnivorous plant from Brazil named "as homage to the great English theoretical physicist and cosmologist, Stephen William Hawking, who died on March 14, 2018. We were impressed with his life's trajectory and his outstanding discoveries in cosmology. He became a signpost not only for other scientists but for all people."			
Gibberula atwoodae Ortea, 2015	Sea snail	Margaret Atwood	One of 21 sea snails of the genus Gibberula concurrently named after female winners of the Prince of Asturias Awards (see also List of organisms named after famous people (born 1900–1924), List of organisms named after famous people (born 1950–1974) and List of organisms named after famous people (born 1975–present)). (Note: Of the 21 women honoured, 9 are in this section of the list, 3 are in the List of organisms named after famous people (born 1900–1924), 5 are in the List of organisms named after famous people (born 1950–1974), 2 are in the List of organisms named after famous people (born 1975–present), and the remaining two are not listed because they are natural scientists: Jane Goodall (Gibberula goodallae) and Linda R. Watkins (Gibberula watkinsae).). "Named in honour of Margaret Atwood (Ottawa, Canada, 1939), winner of the 2008 Prince of Asturias Award for Literature, prolific poet, novelist, literary critic and political activist, with a prominent role in organisations such as Amnesty International and BirdLife International, of which she is Honorary President. The Handmaid's Tale (1985) is her most acclaimed work."			
Gibberula hendricksae Ortea, 2015	Sea snail	Barbara Hendricks	One of 21 sea snails of the genus Gibberula concurrently named after female winners of the Prince of Asturias Awards. "Named in honour of opera singer Barbara Hendricks (Arkansas, USA, 1948 – Sweden), winner of the Prince of Asturias Award for the Arts in 2000, honorary ambassador for life of UNHCR, with which she collaborated for 15 years in support of refugees; she was distinguished by François Mitterrand in 1992 with the Legion of Honour of the French Republic."			
Gibberula leibovitzae Ortea, 2015	Sea snail	Annie Leibovitz	One of 21 sea snails of the genus Gibberula concurrently named after female winners of the Prince of Asturias Awards. "Named in honour of American photographer Anna Lou Leibovitz (Waterbury, 1949), winner of the 2013 Prince of Asturias Award for Communication and Humanities, known mainly for her portraits of celebrities, she was the first woman to have her work exhibited at the National Portrait Gallery in Washington DC."			
Gibberula martingaiteae Ortea, 2015	Sea snail	Carmen Martín Gaite	One of 21 sea snails of the genus Gibberula concurrently named after female winners of the Prince of Asturias Awards. "Named in honour of writer Carmen Martín Gaite (Salamanca, Spain, 1925–2000), winner of the 1988 Prince of Asturias Award for Literature, shared with Galician poet José Ángel Valente (1929–2000); she was the first woman to win the Spanish National Literature Prize (1978) for El cuarto de atrás and received the National Literature Prize in 1994 [again] for her work as a whole."			
Gibberula nussbaumae Ortea, 2015	Sea snail	Martha Nussbaum	One of 21 sea snails of the genus Gibberula concurrently named after female winners of the Prince of Asturias Awards. "Named in honour of American philosopher Martha C. Nussbaum (New York, 1947), distinguished in 2012 with the Prince of Asturias Award for Social Sciences, for making philosophy a more solid, more humane and less moribund activity than in previous decades, thanks to works such as Hiding from Humanity: Disgust, Shame, and the Law, where she makes a profound study of emotions."			
Gibberula pignonae Ortea, 2015	Sea snail	Nélida Piñon	One of 21 sea snails of the genus Gibberula concurrently named after female winners of the Prince of Asturias Awards. "Named in honour of Nélida Piñón (Vila Isabel, Rio de Janeiro, Brazil, 1937), laureate of the 2005 Prince of Asturias Award for Literature; a staunch defender of human rights and author of works such as A república dos sonhos (1984), O pão de cada dia (1996) and Vozes do deserto (2004), written with an exciting artistic narrative, based on reality, memory, fantasy and dreams."			
Gibberula robinsonae Ortea, 2015	Sea snail	Mary Robinson	One of 21 sea snails of the genus Gibberula concurrently named after female winners of the Prince of Asturias Awards. "Named in honour of Mary Robinson (Ballina, Ireland, 1927), winner of the 2006 Prince of Asturias Award for Social Sciences, she was the first woman to become President of the Republic of Ireland (1990–1997), later becoming UN High Commissioner for Human Rights (1997–2002). She holds honorary doctorates from 31 universities around the world."			
Gibberula sasakawai Ortea & Moro, 2024	Sea snail	Yōhei Sasakawa	Its name "pays tribute to the illustrious Yōhei Sasakawa, president of the Nippon Foundation, in recognition of his outstanding contribution to the Ocean Census program and his tireless support of marine research."			
Gibberula sassenae Ortea, 2015	Sea snail	Saskia Sassen	One of 21 sea snails of the genus Gibberula concurrently named after female winners of the Prince of Asturias Awards. "Named in honour of Dutch sociologist Saskia Sassen (The Hague, 1949), distinguished in 2013 with the Prince of Asturias Award for Social Sciences for her contributions to the understanding of the phenomenon of globalisation and urban sociology with publications such as The Global City (1991)."			
Gibberula veilae Ortea, 2015	Sea snail	Simone Veil	One of 21 sea snails of the genus Gibberula concurrently named after female winners of the Prince of Asturias Awards. "Named in honour of French politician Simone Veil (Nice, 1927), winner of the 2005 Prince of Asturias Award for International Cooperation, for embodying the ideals and achievements of a united Europe. President of the European Parliament from 1979 to 1982, her honours include Grand Officer of the Legion of Honour (France) and the Charlemagne Prize (Germany, 1981)."			
Gilmourella † Carnevale & Bannikov, 2019	Fish	David Gilmour	A genus created for a fossil dragonet from the Eocene of Monte Bolca, Italy.			
Giupponia lemmyi Gallão, Bichuette, Kury & Hara, 2026	Harvestman	Lemmy	"the species honors Lemmy Kilmister, English musician and iconic heavy metal and hard rock singer (and songwriter too), and founder of the rock band Motörhead."			
Giupponia ozzyi Gallão, Bichuette, Kury & Hara, 2026	Harvestman	Ozzy Osbourne	A troglobitic species whose name "honors Ozzy Osbourne, another iconic heavy metal and hard rock singer (and songwriter too) who co-founded the band Black Sabbath. On an additional note, he is also known for biting a bat (a cave-related animal) during a concert."			
Gladiatoria harrisi † Adrain, McAdams & Westrop 2011	Trilobite	Richard Harris	One of five trilobites of the genus Gladiatoria concurrently named after cast members of the 2000 film Gladiator (see also List of organisms named after famous people (born 1950–1974)).			
Gladiatoria reedi † Adrain, McAdams & Westrop 2011	Trilobite	Oliver Reed	One of five trilobites of the genus Gladiatoria concurrently named after cast members of the 2000 film Gladiator.			
Gnathia jimmybuffetti Erasmus, Hadfield, Sikkel & Smit, 2023	Crustacean	Jimmy Buffett	A species of isopod native to the Florida Keys. Sikkel and his team are long-time fans of Jimmy Buffett's music, which is very associated with the Florida Keys, so they decided to name the new species after the musician. Buffett died only two months after the publication of the paper.			
Gnathia marleyi Farquharson, Smit & Sikkel, 2012	Crustacean	Bob Marley	"named for the famous Caribbean singer, Bob Marley, as this species is as uniquely Caribbean as Bob Marley."			
Gnathostenetroides renbourni Malyutina & L.Bruce, 2019	Crustacean	John Renbourn	"Named for the late John Renbourn (1944–2015), an inspirational, brilliant and musically diverse British virtuoso guitarist."			
Gorbiscape gorbachevi Zamani & Marusik, 2020	Spider	Mikhail Gorbachev	"named after Mikhail S. Gorbachev, the first [sic] and last president of the Soviet Union, on the occasion of his 89th birthday (02 March 2020)."			
Gravicalymene bakeri † Smith & Ebach, 2020	Trilobite	Tom Baker	"After Thomas Stewart Baker, the fourth actor to play the title character in the television series Doctor Who, for inspiring the [...] authors to develop careers in science."			
Greeffiella beatlei Lorenzen, 1969	Roundworm	The Beatles				
Hantzschia beksinskii M.Rybak, Kochman-Kędziora	Diatom	Zdzisław Beksiński	A species from the Banda Islands, Indonesia, described by scientists from the University of Rzeszów.			
Hapalopus aldanus West, 2000	Spider	Alan Alda	"in honor of Mr. Alan Alda for conveying his interest in the natural sciences to the public as host of the television show Scientific American Frontiers."; Subsequently transferred to genus Magnacarina.			
Hapalotremus chespiritoi Ferretti et al., 2018	Spider	Chespirito	A Peruvian tarantula named "in honour of Roberto Gómez Bolaños (1929–2014), commonly known by his pseudonym "Chespirito". He was [...] widely regarded as one of the most important Spanish-language humorists of the twentieth century. Curiously, the shape of the spermatheca of [the] female of H. chespiritoi sp. nov. resembles the small vinyl antennae of 'Chapulín Colorado', a comical and bungling superhero created by R.G. Bolaños."			
Haplocauda mendesi Silveira, Lima & McHugh, 2022	Firefly	Chico Mendes	A species endemic to the Brazilian Amazon rainforest.			
Harpactea mateparlovi Pavlek & Arnedo, 2020	Spider	Mate Parlov	A woodlouse hunter spider from Croatia "named after Mate Parlov (1948–2008), Croatian boxer, Olympic gold medallist, and European and World Champion, because of its 'puffy' and 'strong' pedipalp segments."			
Heckethornia bowiei † McAdams & Adrain, 2009	Trilobite	David Bowie				
Hedyotis papafranciscoi Alejandro	Flowering plant	Pope Francis	This species from the Philippines was discovered by researchers of the Catholic University of Santo Tomas (Manila) and "dedicated to Pope Francis, the reigning pope [...][at the time of the species description, 2015] of the Catholic Church. Jorge Mario Bergoglio chose Francis as his papal name in honor of Saint Francis of Assisi. Francis is the first Jesuit pope." Pope Francis had visited the university campus during his first papal visit to the Philippines, that same year.			
Hellinsia aguilerai Gielis, 2011	Moth	Jaime Roldós Aguilera	This species is native to Ecuador and "named after president Jaime Roldos Aguilera from Ecuador, who died in an airplane accident in 1981."			
Hendrixella † Bannikov & Carnevale, 2009	Fish	Jimi Hendrix	A genus of fossil percoid fish from the Eocene of Monte Bolca.			
Hensonbatrachus † Gardner & Brinkman, 2015	Frog	Jim Henson	A genus of fossil frogs from the Cretaceous of Alberta, Canada. The sole known species is named H. kermiti, after Henson's character Kermit the Frog.			
Hernandaria chicomendesi DaSilva & Pinto-da-Rocha, 2010	Harvestman	Chico Mendes	A species from Brazil, named "in honor of Chico Mendes (1944–1988), rubber extraction union leader who fought for Amazon preservation and against worker exploitation. He was killed by landlords as a reaction to his fight for the Amazon."			
Heteragrion brianmayi Lencioni, 2013	Damselfly	Brian May	One of four Heteragrion species named after members of the band Queen. (see also List of organisms named after famous people (born 1950–1974)).			
Heteragrion freddiemercuryi Lencioni, 2013	Damselfly	Freddie Mercury	One of four Heteragrion species named after members of the band Queen.			
Heteragrion rogertaylori Lencioni, 2013	Damselfly	Roger Taylor	One of four Heteragrion species named after members of the band Queen.			
Heteropoda davidbowie Jäger, 2008	Spider	David Bowie	"The species name is honouring the rock-singer David Bowie – composer of the music album The Rise and Fall of Ziggy Stardust and the Spiders from Mars and interpreter of songs such as "Glass Spider"— who has been in [the] early years of his career sometimes as painted as the frontal view of the head of this new species, furthermore inspiring the author by his songs full of energy, creativity and open-mindedness."			
Heteropoda ernstulrichi Jäger, 2008	Spider	Ernst Ulrich von Weizsäcker	"named in honour of Ernst Ulrich Michael freiherr Von Weizsäcker, German natural scientist and politician, for his efforts towards an ecological treatment of our planet and his ambition to reduce wasting of natural resources as described, e.g., in the book Factor Four he co-authored"			
Heteropoda hildebrandti Jäger, 2008	Spider	Dieter Hildebrandt	"named in honour of the cabaret artist Dieter Hildebrandt for his long-term efforts trying to educate German politicians."			
Heteropoda udolindenberg Jäger, 2008	Spider	Udo Lindenberg	"named after the German rocksinger Udo Lindenberg, who inspired me with his songs and texts over many years."			
Heteropoda uexkuelli Jäger, 2008	Spider	Carl Wolmar Jakob von Uexküll	"named after the founder of the alternative/green Nobel-prize Jakob von Uexkuell, who initiated the World Future Council searching for solutions against global overpopulation of humans and global warming, an issue treated also in the 2007 United Nations Climate Change Conference [in] Bali, the island, where this new species [was] collected"			
Hieracium elizabethae-reginae T.C.G.Rich & J.K.Warren	Flowering plant	Elizabeth II	A hawkweed endemic to Gloucestershire, England, "named in honour of Her Majesty Queen Elizabeth II as it was first discovered on her Platinum Jubilee Weekend 2-5 June 2022."			
Himantolophus kalami Rajeeshkumar, Pietsch & Saravanane, 2022	Fish	A. P. J. Abdul Kalam	A footballfish found in the waters of the Andaman and Nicobar Islands, "named in honor of Dr. A.P.J. Abdul Kalam, an eminent aerospace scientist and former President of India, for his many contributions to the field of space research and India's missile technology. He was very keen in encouraging students and greatly motivated them with his inspiring books and speeches."			
Hondurantemna chespiritoi Rodrigues, Rivera, Reid & Svenson, 2017	Mantis	Chespirito	"named after "Chespirito", the screen name of famous late Mexican TV comedian Roberto Gomez Bolaños. Chespirito created and portrayed several characters cherished across Latin America, including El Chavo del Ocho and El Chapulín Colorado, the latter a sort of superhero whose outfit was inspired by grasshoppers or "chapulines"."			
Horaglanis abdulkalami Babu, 2012	Catfish	A. P. J. Abdul Kalam	A subterranean blind catfish endemic to Kerala, India, "Named in honour of the former president of India, Dr. A. P. J. Abdul Kalam, who ignited young minds towards the real world of Science and Technology."			
Huancabamba kubricki Benedetti & Pinto-da-Rocha, 2022	Harvestman	Stanley Kubrick				
Hyalella wangarie Reis, Bueno & Araujo, 2023	Crustacean	Wangarĩ Maathai	A freshwater amphipod from Brazil named "in honor to Wangari Muta Maathai, an environmental leader and the first African woman to win a Nobel Prize (in 2014 [sic; actually 2004]), for her career and activism in defense of the environment, human rights and justice. Wangari created the organization Green Belt Movement, which aimed to plant trees by women on the outskirts of Nairobi as a way to protect the soil from erosion."			
Hydraena birendra Skale & Jäch, 2009	Beetle	Birendra of Nepal	A minute moss beetle "named for King Birendra Bir Bikram Shah Dev (1945–2001), who is widely considered the best king to ever reign in Nepal. He was seen as a symbol of national unity, who granted a democratic government. The type material of Hydraena birendra was collected [in Nepal] in 1983, 1995 and finally in 2001. In the same year King Birendra died tragically, murdered by his own son Dipendra."			
Hydraena johncoltranei Perkins, 2011	Beetle	John Coltrane	A minute moss beetle "Named in honor of the jazz great, the supreme saxophonist John Coltrane."			
Hydroptila zerbinae Souza, Santos & Takiya, 2014	Caddisfly	Therezinha Zerbini	A Brazilian microcaddisfly "named after Therezinha de Godoy Zerbini who organized the "Movimento Feminino Pela Anistia" in many Brazilian States."			
Hydroscapha redfordi Maier et al., 2010	Beetle	Robert Redford	"This species is named in honor of actor/conservationist Robert Redford, whose 1972 portrayal of the semi-fictional Jeremiah Johnson in the film of the same name brought attention to the character as well as the beauty of the region. One of us (MAI) was so affected by the film that he chose to spend his life and career in the Rockies. The type locality of this species, Jerry Johnson Hot Springs, is named for Redford's character [NOTE: this is actually incorrect], but it is Redford's continuing work to safeguard the wild legacy of the Rocky Mountains that makes this name a fitting tribute."			
Hyloscirtus princecharlesi Coloma et al., 2012	Frog	Charles III	"The specific name princecharlesi is a patronym that honors His Royal Highness Charles, Prince of Wales (Charles Philip Arthur George Windsor). In his call to halt tropical deforestation, Prince Charles uses frogs as symbols, and his Rainforests SOS Campaign includes a video with a frog as a rainforest ambassador. For this reason he is affectionately known by the media as the 'frog prince'. Prince Charles is contributing significantly to the growth of awareness in the battle against tropical deforestation, climate change, and the catastrophic extinction of rainforest amphibians. His work is leading to increased awareness of these issues, and this increased awareness benefits biodiversity conservation, sustainability, alleviation of poverty, and ensures ecosystem services for present and future generations."			
Hypsolebias lulai Ramos et al., 2023	Fish	Luiz Inácio Lula da Silva	A killifish from Brazil "named in honor of Luiz Inácio Lula da Silva, the current Brazilian president, responsible for restoring conservation actions and socio-environmental enhancement and resuming incentives for Brazilian science."			
Hyptidendron dorothyanum Antar & Harley	Flowering plant	Dorothy Stang	"The specific epithet honors Sister Dorothy Mae Stang who worked as a missionary in the Amazon rainforest [to which this plant is native], fighting for the right to the land of the poorest people, for education and for environmental questions. In 2005 Sister Dorothy was brutally murdered by farmers at the age of 73, reflecting the, still common, occurrence of violent deaths in the Amazon region, as a result of land property disputes and illegal deforestation."			
Hyrokybe lightfooti † Adrain, 1998	Trilobite	Gordon Lightfoot				
Hyrokybe mitchellae † Adrain, 1998	Trilobite	Joni Mitchell				
Hyrokybe youngi † Adrain, 1998	Trilobite	Neil Young				
Iare cheguevarai Martínez, Ceccarelli & Zaldivar-Riverón, 2010	Wasp	Che Guevara				
Ibexicurus parsonsi † Adrain et al., 2003	Trilobite	Gram Parsons				
Ichneumon adairae Kittel, 2016	Wasp	Eleanor Adair	Replacement name for Ichneumon nanus Ratzeburg, 1848, which was preoccupied by Ichneumon nanus Cuvier, 1833.			
Ilomantis ginsburgae Brannoch & Svenson, 2016	Mantis	Ruth Bader Ginsburg	The scientists who described this species pioneered a new method of identification; whereas the study of male genitals is typically used to classify insect species, they instead examined the female genitalia to establish the new species. It was then "named [...] in honor of Ruth Joan Bader Ginsburg, Associate Justice of the Supreme Court of the United States, for her relentless fight for gender equality, as well as for her sartorial appreciation of the jabot, which is reminiscent of the postcervical plate of Ilomantis, a diagnostic character that embodies this judicial accessory." Upon learning about the name, Ginsburg commented "Gregor Samsa woke up one morning to find himself changed into a big black bug; Praying mantis, female too, is ever so much more attractive."			
Ilyodon lennoni Meyer & Förster, 1983	Fish	John Lennon	A species of splitfin found in the Chacambero river, Mexico. Some sources consider it a synonym of Ilyodon whitei.			
Inbiocystiscus tanialeonae Ortea & Espinosa, 2016	Sea snail	Tania León	"Named in honour of Cuban conductor and composer Tania León (Havana, 1943), to whom the fifth edition of the festival Musiciennes en Guadeloupe et Martinique was dedicated (May 2016), the same year in which the scientific expedition Martinique-2016 took place."			
Indigryllus sagani Jaiswara & Robillard, 2022	Cricket	Carl Sagan	"named after the American astronomer, Carl Edward Sagan in recognition of his significant contributions to scientific research on extra-terrestrial life."			
Intelcystiscus gordonmoorei Ortea & Espinosa, 2001	Sea snail	Gordon Moore	"In honour of Gordon Moore, co-founder of Intel, and in recognition of his support for the taxonomy of the future". The genus Intelcystiscus, created concurrently, is named after Intel.			
Ischnocnema penaxavantinho Giaretta, Toffoli & Oliveira, 2007	Frog	Pena Branca & Xavantinho	A species from Brazil whose name "is an arbitrary fusion of two Portuguese words pena (meaning feather) and xavantinho (meaning little Xavante, a group of pre-colonization natives). These names were used by two regional singer brothers (Pena Branca and Xavantinho) who in their songs emphasized the beauty of the Brazilian nature and the countryside way of life. It is used as a noun in apposition and as homage to both artists."			
Ischnothyreus elvis Kranz-Baltensperger, 2011	Spider	Elvis Presley				
Ischnothyreus gigeri Richard, 2016	Spider	H. R. Giger				
Jaggermeryx † Miller et al., 2014	Even-toed ungulate	Mick Jagger	A whippomorph from the Miocene, related to hippopotamuses and whales, named "for Sir Mick Jagger, in recognition of his famous lips", since this animal was believed to have a "highly innervated muzzle with mobile and tactile lips".			
Janbechynea georgepauljohnringo Santiago-Blay, 2004	Beetle	The Beatles	"honors the first name of the members of the 1960's British musical band, "The Beatles": George Harrison, Paul McCartney, John Lennon, and Richard Starkey (a.k.a. "Ringo Starr")"			
Japewiella dollypartoniana J.L. Allen et al.	Lichen	Dolly Parton	"named in honor of Dolly Parton, one of the most famous country singers of all time and a native of the southern Appalachians. Ms. Parton rose to stardom from humble beginnings in the mountains of eastern Tennessee on the edge of the Great Smoky Mountains where this species grows abundantly [...] Her tireless efforts have led to national and even global attention for one of America's most scenic and biologically significant regions."			
Jasminum bhumibolianum Chalermglin	Flowering plant	Bhumibol Adulyadej	A species of jasmine native to Thailand, "dedicated to His Majesty King Bhumibol Adulyadej on his 84th anniversary in recognition of the great efforts he has made to conserve native plants in Thailand."			
Jorottui ipuanai Moreno-González, Gutierrez-Estrada & Prendini, 2023	Whip spider	Ramón Paz Ipuana	"This new species is named after Ramón Paz Ipuana (1937–1992), a Venezuelan Wayuu educator, researcher, linguist, poet and writer, who devoted his life to studying Wayuu culture and promoting the rights and traditions of Wayuu people." This species is native to the Guajira Peninsula, the area originally inhabited by the Wayuu people.			
Jorunna davidbowieii Ortea & Moro, 2016	Sea slug	David Bowie	"Because of its ability to change colour, this species is named after the brilliant musician and singer David Bowie, 'the chameleon', who passed away in January 2016, [and who] was the first to give music an image, associated with his own figure and his collection of works of art. Lazarus, one of his last works, is a hymn to the hope of his resurrection."			
Jotus karllagerfeldi Baehr, Schubert, & Harms, 2019	Spider	Karl Lagerfeld	"This species is a black and white spider which looked like Karl Lagerfeld and his signature look, as the spider has large black eyes, which reminded of his sunglasses and its black and white front legs were reminiscent of Lagerfeld's kent collar and handgloves."			
Kahlerosphaera kerteszi † Kozur, Moix & Ozsvárt, 2007	Protist	Imre Kertész	A fossil radiolarian from the Triassic of Turkey.			
Kalamiella Singh, Wood, Mhatre & Venkateswaran, 2019	Bacterium	A. P. J. Abdul Kalam	A new genus for a bacterium isolated from the Cupola module of the International Space Station, "named after APJ Abdul Kalam (1934–2015), a well-known scientist who advanced space research in India."			
Kalloprion kilmisteri Eriksson, 2006	Polychaete worm	Lemmy	"Named in honor of Lemmy Kilmister of Motörhead, for musical inspiration during the course of this study."			
Kankuamo marquezi Perafán, Galvis & Gutiérrez, 2016	Spider	Gabriel García Márquez	A species of tarantula endemic to Colombia, named "in honor [of] Gabriel García Márquez (Aracataca, Colombia, 1927 – Mexico D.F., Mexico, 2014), who was a renowned Colombian writer, considered one of the most significant authors of the 20th century, and awarded the 1982 Nobel Prize in Literature for One Hundred Years of Solitude."			
Kepplerites aigii † Mitta, 2008	Ammonite	Gennadiy Aygi				
Khoratamia phattharajani † Deesri et al., 2023	Fish	Bhumibol Adulyadej	A fossil bowfin from the Cretaceous of Thailand, whose name "derives from Phatthara + Rajan the designation of Somdet Phra Phatthara Maharat, a title given to King Bhumibol Adulyadej, (Rama IX) in recognition of his research dedication and support for breeding Nile tilapia (Oreochromis niloticus), which has provided a new career for over a million Thai agriculturalists and became a primary protein source for the Thai people."			
Komagataella mondaviorum Naumov, Naumova & Boundy-Mills, 2018	Yeast	Robert Mondavi and Margrit Mondavi	"named in honor of the late Robert and Margrit Mondavi, honoring their tremendous impact on the CA wine industry and their generous and forward-thinking support of facilities and programs at the University of California Davis [where the strain was identified]."			
Kornickeria marleyi Cohen & Morin, 1993	Crustacean	Bob Marley	"This Jamaican species, which produces remarkable luminescent displays, is named in honour of the late Jamaican reggae musician, Bob Marley."			
Krisna garciamarquezi † Dietrich & Vega, 1995	Leafhopper	Gabriel García Márquez	A fossil species found in Dominican amber. Subsequently transferred to genus Archiokrisna.			
Kudoa akihitoi Kasai, Setsuda & Sato, 2017	Myxozoan	Akihito	A parasite of Acanthogobius hasta, collected in the Ariake Sea, Japan, and "named in honor of Akihito, the reigning Emperor of Japan, who has a great interest in science and ichthyological research, particularly the taxonomy of the family Gobiidae [to which the host species belongs], and has previously published in the field."			
Kudoa empressmichikoae Kasai, Setsuda & Sato, 2017	Myxozoan	Empress Michiko	A parasite of Acanthogobius hasta, collected in the Ariake Sea, Japan, and "named in honor of Empress Michiko, the wife of Japan's Emperor Akihito, who unfailingly supports his role of monarch and its associated duties."			
Lagocheilus hayaomiyazakii Bhosale et al., 2025	Snail	Hayao Miyazaki	"honouring Hayao Miyazaki (b. 1941), a renowned Japanese animator, filmmaker, and cofounder of Studio Ghibli; the new species is named after him in recognition of his contribution to animation films."			
Lankascincus merrill L. Wickramasinghe, Vidanapathirana & N. Wickramasinghe, 2020	Lizard	Merrill J. Fernando	This skink is endemic to Sri Lanka and was named "honoring Mr. Merrill J. Fernando, founder of Dilmah and Dilmah Conservation, for his support of biodiversity conservation in Sri Lanka."			
Lapisperla † Sroka, Staniczek & Kondratieff, 2018	Stonefly	The Rolling Stones	One of 2 genera and 7 species of fossil stoneflies found in Burmese amber, and named concurrently in 2018 after The Rolling Stones and its members on the occasion of Mick Jagger's 75th birthday (see also species in the genera Electroneuria, Largusoperla and Petroperla). "Burmese amber is one of the oldest resins with insect inclusions, and stoneflies are one of the oldest pterygote lineages. What lies closer at hand than to link fossil stoneflies in ancient stones with the Rolling Stones and to name the new species after the members of the oldest and greatest Rock 'n' Roll Band in the world. The [...] new family and genera are named after 'the Stones', and all present and former members of the Rolling Stones are honoured with their own species.[...] The first part of the name refers to the Rolling Stones and is derived from Latin 'lapis', meaning 'stone', the suffix 'perla' refers to the stonefly genus Perla."			
Lapisperla keithrichardsi † Sroka, Staniczek & Kondratieff, 2018	Stonefly	Keith Richards	One of 2 genera and 7 species of fossil stoneflies found in Burmese amber, and named concurrently in 2018 after The Rolling Stones and its members on the occasion of Mick Jagger's 75th birthday (see also species in the genera Electroneuria, Largusoperla and Petroperla). "The name refers to Keith Richards, founding member and guitar player of the Rolling Stones, master of the ancient art of weaving."			
Largusoperla billwymani † Sroka, Staniczek & Kondratieff, 2018	Stonefly	Bill Wyman	One of 2 genera and 7 species of fossil stoneflies found in Cretaceous Burmese amber, and named concurrently in 2018 after The Rolling Stones and its members on the occasion of Mick Jagger's 75th birthday (see also species in the genera Electroneuria, Lapisperla and Petroperla). "The name refers to Bill Wyman, former bass player of the Rolling Stones until 1991."			
Largusoperla brianjonesi † Sroka, Staniczek & Kondratieff, 2018	Stonefly	Brian Jones	One of 2 genera and 7 species of fossil stoneflies found in Cretaceous Burmese amber, and named concurrently in 2018 after The Rolling Stones and its members on the occasion of Mick Jagger's 75th birthday (see also species in the genera Electroneuria, Lapisperla and Petroperla). "The name refers to Brian Jones, founding member and former guitar player of the Rolling Stones until 1969."			
Largusoperla charliewattsi † Sroka, Staniczek & Kondratieff, 2018	Stonefly	Charlie Watts	One of 2 genera and 7 species of fossil stoneflies found in Cretaceous Burmese amber, and named concurrently in 2018 after The Rolling Stones and its members on the occasion of Mick Jagger's 75th birthday (see also species in the genera Electroneuria, Lapisperla and Petroperla). "The name refers to Charlie Watts, drummer of the Rolling Stones, which is most adequate in regard of the pronounced drumming apparatus of the new species."			
Largusoperla micktaylori † Sroka, Staniczek & Kondratieff, 2018	Stonefly	Mick Taylor	One of 2 genera and 7 species of fossil stoneflies found in Cretaceous Burmese amber, and named concurrently in 2018 after The Rolling Stones and its members on the occasion of Mick Jagger's 75th birthday (see also species in the genera Electroneuria, Lapisperla and Petroperla). "The name refers to Mick Taylor, guitar player of the Rolling Stones between 1969 and 1975 with unmatched virtuosity and dexterity, which is reflected by the fingerlike, three-lobed subgenital plate of the new species."			
Lasioglossum (Dialictus) hitchensi Gibbs, 2012	Bee	Christopher Hitchens	Replacement name for Lasioglossum (Dialictus) atlanticum Mitchell, 1960, a junior secondary homonym of Lasioglossum interruptum atlanticum (Cockerell, 1938)			
Latica galeanoi da Silva, Guerrero, Bidegaray-Batista & Simó, 2020	Spider	Eduardo Galeano	A species of ground spider found in Uruguay and Northern Argentina, named "in honour of Eduardo Galeano (Montevideo, Uruguay 1940–2015), who was a renowned Uruguayan writer and is considered one of the most significant Latin American authors of the twentieth century."			
Lathrolestes aitmatovi Reshchikov, 2012	Wasp	Chinghiz Aitmatov	This species was described from specimens collected in Kyrgyzstan.			
Lavadamia joplinae † Adrain et al., 2003	Trilobite	Janis Joplin				
Leistus coltranei Allegro, 2007	Beetle	John Coltrane	"I dedicate this species to the tenor saxophonist John Coltrane, a giant in jazz music."			
Lemmysuchus † Johnson, Young et al., 2017	Reptile	Lemmy	A fossil thalattosuchian from the Jurassic. Its name means "Lemmy's crocodile".			
Lemmythentes kilmisteri † Martin, Novo, González Ruiz & Tejedor, 2024	Marsupial mammal	Lemmy	A fossil paucituberculate from the Miocene of Argentina, named "in honor to Ian "Lemmy" Kilmister, for his outstanding achievements in the history and development of Rock and Roll with the band Motörhead."			
Lepanthes nubiamuñozana J.S. Moreno, Gal.-Tar., & Zuluaga	Orchid	Nubia Muñoz	This species is native to Colombia and its name "honors Nubia Amparo Muñoz Calero, a renowned Colombian medical scientist who has been a cornerstone in epidemiological research. She was nominated for the Nobel Prize in 2008 by the International Epidemiological Association, due to her groundbreaking advancements in the study of a vaccine against the human papillomavirus (HPV). Her work has not only had a significant impact on global public health, particularly in preventing cervical cancer among women, but has also earned her the Order of Boyacá in 2011, which is the highest honor that the Colombian Government awards to distinguished citizens for their service to the country and stands as a testament to the transformative impact of her work. Nubia Muñoz serves as a role model for female scientists in Colombia, demonstrating that women's leadership in science can lead to significant, life-saving advancements."			
Lepidocephalichthys zeppelini Havird et al., 2010	Fish	Led Zeppelin	"The species name zeppelini is a reference to the 1968–1980 band Led Zeppelin. Use of the Gibson EDS-1275 double-neck guitar by Jimmy Page reminded us of the diagnostic double lamina circularis of this species." The lead author also stated "I'm a big Led Zeppelin fan, and I was listening to them while I was working on the fish. The structure that makes this species unique just reminded me of the guitar that Jimmy Page played."			
Lepisiota elbazi Sharaf & Hita Garcia, 2020	Ant	Farouk El-Baz	The name "honors Prof. Farouk El-Baz, the Egyptian space scientist, Boston University, USA in recognition of his distinguished scientific achievements."			
Leptopholcus gurnahi Huber, 2011	Spider	Abdulrazak Gurnah	A cellar spider native to Tanzania.			
Leptopyrgus melbourni Haase, 2008	Freshwater snail	Hirini Melbourne	This species is endemic to North Island, New Zealand, and "dedicated to Hirini Melbourne (1949–2003), musician and composer who preserved, revived, and further developed traditional Māori music."			
Leucothoe eltoni Thomas, 2015	Crustacean	Elton John	"In reference to the large shoe-like first gnathopod of this species and the oversize boots Elton John wore as the local pinball champion in the movie Tommy."			
Leuctra dylani Graf, 2007	Stonefly	Bob Dylan	"dedicated to Bob Dylan, poet, composer, singer and dancer."			
Librelula † Petrulevičius, 2020	Damselfly	Luiz Inácio Lula da Silva	A fossil genus from the Palaeocene of Jujuy Province, Argentina. The name is "wordplay from Castilian words libélula, meaning Odonata, and libre, meaning free; Lula."			
Litokoala dicksmithi † Black et al., 2013	Marsupial mammal	Dick Smith	An extinct koala named for Smith's long-term financial support of paleontological research in Australia.			
Liturgusa algorei Svenson, 2014	Mantis	Al Gore	Named for Gore's "environmental activism including his efforts to raise public awareness of global climate change".			
Liturgusa fossetti Svenson, 2014	Mantis	Steve Fossett	Named for Fossett's "inspirational dedication to adventure and exploration".			
Litzicurus shawi † Adrain, McAdams & Westrop, 2009	Trilobite	Robert Shaw				
Lontra weiri † Prassack, 2016	Otter	Bob Weir	"Etymology – Old English, 'wer', a structure used to trap fish, derivative of root of werian to 'dam up'. A specific epithet with dual etymology: weiri reflects the riverine habitat and piscivorous diet of river otters; it also honors Grateful Dead guitarist, Bob Weir, in celebration of the band's 50th anniversary."			
Loureedia Miller et al., 2012	Spider	Lou Reed	A genus of velvet spiders "named for Lou Reed, leader of the rock band The Velvet Underground from 1965–1970."			
Loxosceles coheni Zamani, Mirshamsi & Marusik, 2021	Spider	Leonard Cohen	"in honor of Leonard Norman Cohen [...] the most favorite artist of the first author, because his music kept him working during the long, cold, and dark winters of Finland."			
Lumieria woodyalleni Benedetti & Pinto-da-Rocha, 2022	Harvestman	Woody Allen				
Machaerium jobimianum C.V.Mendonça & A.M.G.Azevedo	Legume	Antônio Carlos Jobim	This species, native to Brazil, is "named in honor of Brazilian popular poet, musician, and environmental activist Antônio Carlos Jobim (1927-1994)."			
Mackenziurus johnnyi † Adrain & Edgecombe, 1997	Trilobite	Johnny Ramone	One of four species concurrently named in 1997 after members of The Ramones (see also List of organisms named after famous people (born 1950–1974)).			
Mahajanganella schwarzeneggeri Lorenz, Loria, Harvey & Harms, 2022	Pseudoscorpion	Arnold Schwarzenegger	This species belongs to the group known as Hercules pseudoscorpions, because of their "raptorial pedipalps with heavily armed and robust pedipalpal femora, resulting in a somewhat hulky appearance"; it was named "honoring Arnold Schwarzenegger, a famous former bodybuilder from Austria, known as an actor in the movie Terminator, former governor of California and now supporting conservation programs."			
Makebapone Fisher et al., 2025	Ant	Miriam Makeba	"The genus name Makebapone is derived from "Makeba", honoring the renowned South African singer and activist Miriam Makeba (1932–2008), whose cultural influence and advocacy for African identity and justice resonate globally. The suffix -pone follows the convention established in many Ponerinae genera, derived from the type genus Ponera. The name thus links African heritage with the lineage of Ponerinae ants." All species in this genus live in Africa.			
Malagasya elvisi Cumberlidge, Soma, Leever & Daniels, 2020	Crustacean	Elvis Presley	"The new species is named for the unusual fields of dense short setae lining the margins of the dactyli and part of the propodi [...], which gives the crab the appearance of wearing suede shoes on its feet (albeit a brown colour in the type specimen). The species epithet "elvisi" is [...] inspired by the song "Blue Suede Shoes" written by Carl Perkins and made famous by Elvis Presley."			
Malthinus rifbjergi † Fanti & Damgaard, 2018	Beetle	Klaus Rifbjerg	A fossil soldier beetle found in Eocene Baltic amber.			
Malthodes moellehavei † Fanti & Damgaard, 2018	Beetle	Johannes Møllehave	A fossil soldier beetle found in Eocene Baltic amber, "named in honour of the Danish priest, author and lecturer Johannes Volf Møllehave, to thank him for his work and to further recognize him for the awards that he has earned."			
Marshiella lettermani Shaw, 2000	Wasp	David Letterman	"The species name is a patronym for David Letterman, host of The Late Show, in appreciation for his outstanding contributions to late night entertainment. Many a dull day has been improved by his humour. It somehow seems appropriate that a really weird insect should be named in his honor."			
Masiakasaurus knopfleri † Sampson, Carrano & Forster, 2001	Dinosaur	Mark Knopfler	"after singer/songwriter Mark Knopfler, whose music inspired expedition crews."			
Maxillaria gorbatschowii Vásquez, Dodson & Ibisch, 2001	Orchid	Mikhail Gorbachev	"in honor of Mikhail Gorbachev for his contribution to world peace and to nature conservation as president of Green Cross International." This species was dedicated to Gorbachev by a friend for his 70th birthday, through a BIOPAT sponsorship.			
Megachile chomskyi Sheffield, 2013	Bee	Noam Chomsky	Named after Chomsky for "his many academic achievements and contributions as a linguist, philosopher, cognitive scientist, historian, political critic, activist and global champion of human rights and freedoms".			
Megapropodiphora arnoldi Brown, 2018	Fly	Arnold Schwarzenegger	World's smallest known fly species. "The genus name is Latin for large foreleg, referring to the structure of the female. The specific epithet refers to Arnold Schwarzenegger, former governor of California, whose own greatly enlarged forelimbs distinguished him in his pre-political careers."			
Megascops stangiae Dantas et al., 2021	Owl	Dorothy Stang	"We name this species in honor of the late Sister Dorothy Mae Stang (1931‒2005), who had worked on behalf of poor farmers and the environment in the Brazilian Amazon region since the 1960s until she was brutally murdered by ranchers in Anapú, Pará State. The common names Xingu Screech Owl (English) and Corujinha do Xingu (Portuguese) refer to the area where the species is found, between the Tapajós and Xingu rivers, where Dorothy was very active as a community leader and ultimately was killed."			
Meitingsunes aldwelles Glowska & Skoracki 2010	Mite	Edward Aldwell	"named in honor of Edward Aldwell, American pianist, music theorist and pedagogue, renowned for his recordings of J. S. Bach." Mei-Ting Sun, after whom genus Meitingsunes is named, studied under Aldwell.			
Melanoplus nelsoni Hill, 2023	Grasshopper	Willie Nelson	A species native to Texas, USA, "Named in honor of Willie Nelson, an iconic American musician entertainer from central Texas whose music lifted our spirits while traveling between field sites during this study. After these last few summers, just like Mr. Nelson, we too have a little Texas in our souls."			
Melanoplus walkeri Hill, 2023	Grasshopper	Jerry Jeff Walker	A species native to Texas, USA, "Named in honor of Jerry Jeff Walker, an iconic Texas musician whose most influential album was recorded near the type locality of this species in the Luckenbach. Walker's songs such as "Hill Country Rain", "Leavin' Texas", and "Sangria Wine" brought me and my field team joy while traveling between field sites and added to the amazing ambiance of the Edwards Plateau."			
Meoneura meszarosi Stuke & Freidberg, 2017	Fly	Michu Meszaros	Flies of the genus Meoneura are very small (1–2 mm). "The new species is dedicated to the Hungarian-born American actor Mihály 'Michu' Mészáros (1939–2016). Only 84 cm tall, he became famous as the "smallest man in the world" performing at the Ringling Bros. and Barnum & Bailey Circus and later as a TV and film actor. He played the role of the alien in the sitcom ALF and pictured a strange extraterrestrial creature as an adorable personage."			
Mercurana Abraham et al., 2013	Frog	Freddie Mercury	"derived from 'Mercury' as a tribute to Freddie Mercury, late lead singer of the British rock band Queen, whose vibrant music inspires the authors, in combination with Rana (Linnaeus, 1758), a suffix commonly used for many frog taxa."			
Mesobuthus brutus Fet et al., 2018	Scorpion	Brutus (Czech band)				
Mesopolobus delafuentei Nieves-Aldrey, Gil-Tapetado & Askew, 2020	Wasp	Félix Rodríguez de la Fuente	"The species honours the memory of Dr. Félix Rodríguez de la Fuente on the centennial of his birth [actually 92 years had passed; the article was published in a monograph honouring Rodríguez de la Fuente on the 40th anniversary of his death]. Dr Rodríguez de la Fuente is one of the people who contributed most to the conservation of wildlife in Spain and he was a model for a whole generation of biologists and naturalists in this country." "The first author is honored to describe this species after Dr. Félix Rodríguez de la Fuente, naturalist, excellent communicator and pioneer of conservation in Spain, a figure who knew how to awaken in me, as in many other young Spaniards of the time, an early vocation for zoology, and love and fascination for Nature."			
Microdipnus papafrancisci Giachino, 2024	Beetle	Pope Francis	"This new species is dedicated to His Holiness Pope Francis, as a sign of gratitude for his constant action in defense of the diversity of life."			
Micronycteris giovanniae Baker & Fonseca, 2007	Bat	Nikki Giovanni	"named to honor Nikki Giovanni in recognition of her poetry and writings."			
Milesdavis † Lieberman, 1994	Trilobite	Miles Davis	Subsequently synonymized with Hedstroemia			
Millardaspis milsteadi † McAdams, Adrain & Karim, 2018	Trilobite	Divine	Named after Divine's birth name, Glenn Milstead.			
Miscophus qaboosi Schmid-Egger & Al-Jahdhami, 2022	Wasp	Qaboos bin Said	A species native to the Arabian Peninsula, "named in honour to [sic] the late Sultan Qaboos who was president of Oman for 40 years and one of the very important persons in Oman."			
Mitrephora sirikitiae Weeras., Chalermglin & R.M.K.Saunders	Flowering plant	Sirikit	A tree of the soursop family endemic to Thailand.			
Mizotrechus marielaforetae Erwin, 2011	Beetle	Marie Laforêt	"based on the full stage name of Marie Laforêt, the famous French actress and singer [...], whose voice has a range of diversity like that found in the carabid species richness of Guyane, and who sang a variety of "torch songs", and here I play on the word "torch", the same word that applies to what is used to ignite the trees of the unique tropical rainforests of South America, an Armageddon in our own times."			
Mniophila haveli Damaška et al., 2024	Beetle	Václav Havel	A flea beetle from Eastern Europe described by Czech scientists and "named after Václav Havel, the Czech intellectual, playwright, dissident, and the first president of the post-Communist Czechoslovakia and the Czech Republic, who crucially contributed to the Velvet Revolution in Czechoslovakia and democracy in Europe in general."			
Modisimus mariposas Huber & Fischer, 2010	Spider	Mirabal sisters	A cellar spider from the Dominican Republic, whose name "honours the Mirabal sisters, who fervently opposed the dictatorship of Trujillo, and formed a group of opponents known as Las Mariposas (The Butterflies). Three of them were assassinated in 1960".			
Montypythonoides Smith & Plane, 1985	Snake	Monty Python	Originally considered an extinct genus from the Miocene, but subsequently synonymized with the extant genus Morelia.			
Mycomya bowiei Omad & Pessacq, 2017	Fly	David Bowie	"in honour of David Bowie, who through his voice and music made our lives better."			
Myrmekiaphila neilyoungi Bond & Platnick, 2007	Spider	Neil Young	"I really enjoy his music and have had a great appreciation of him as an activist for peace and justice," (discoverer Jason) Bond said of Young.			
Mystriocentrus hollandae Jakiel, Palero & Błażewicz, 2020	Crustacean	Agnieszka Holland	Identified by scientists of the University of Łódź and "dedicated to Agnieszka Holland, Polish film director and screenwriter, one of Poland's most recognized filmmakers."			
Myxine floyd Mincarone, Kurtz, Di Dario & Gonçalves, 2026	Hagfish	Pink Floyd	"The specific epithet floyd honours the iconic rock band Pink Floyd, whose groundbreaking musical experimentation, conceptual depth, and artistic innovation have influenced generations of musicians and listeners, including the authors of this paper. The name acknowledges the enduring legacy of the band in pushing creative boundaries into the unfathomable depths of the human mind, an inspiration reflected in the discovery of this distinctive pinkish deep-sea species."			
Naganishia kalamii Venkateswaran, P. Leo & N.K. Singh (2023)	Fungus	A. P. J. Abdul Kalam	A fungal strain isolated during the construction and assembly of the Mars 2020 mission components at NASA cleanrooms, and named in honor of Indian aerospace scientist A. P. J. Abdul Kalam (two of the taxon authors are Indian).			
Nama chaslavskae Meregalli & Borovec, 2023	Weevil	Věra Čáslavská	"This species is named after Věra Čáslavská (1942–2016). She was an artistic gymnast and Czech sports official. In addition to her gymnastic success, she was known for her consistent outspoken support of the Czechoslovak democratization movement in 1968. After the Soviet invasion, Čáslavská's actions resulted in her becoming a persona non grata in the new regime. She was forced into retirement and for many years was denied the right to travel, work, and attend sporting events."			
Nama peternormani Meregalli & Borovec, 2023	Weevil	Peter Norman	"Peter Norman (1942–2006) was an Australian track athlete, who won the silver medal in the 200 metres at the 1968 Summer Olympics in Mexico City. During the medal ceremony he wore a badge of the Olympic Project for Human Rights in support of fellow athletes John Carlos and Tommie Smith. Returning home after the race, he was violently condemned by the Australian media for what he did during the award ceremony and continually boycotted by sports officials, being forever excluded from competitive racing. It was only in 2012 that the Australian Parliament passed a belated rehabilitation."			
Nama switzerae Meregalli & Borovec, 2023	Weevil	Kathrine Switzer	"Kathrine Virginia Switzer (born 1947) is an American marathon runner. In 1967 she became the first woman to run the Boston Marathon as an officially registered competitor. During her run race manager Jock Semple assaulted Switzer, trying to grab her bib number and thereby remove her from official competition. She was inducted into the National Women's Hall of Fame in 2011 for creating a social revolution by empowering women around the world through running."			
Namalycastis jaya Magesh et al., 2012	Polychaete worm	J. Jayalalithaa	A species from the coast of Southern India, named in honour of former chief minister of Tamil Nadu Dr. J. Jayalalithaa's contributions towards education for the impoverished people of Tamil Nadu, a state in southern India, as well as her support for scientific research.			
Nannotrigona gaboi Jaramillo, Ospina & Gonzalez, 2019	Bee	Gabriel García Márquez	A stingless bee from Colombia whose name "honors the Colombian novelist, short-story writer, screenwriter, journalist, and 1982 Nobel Prize laureate Gabriel José de la Concordia García Márquez (6 March 1927–17 April 2014), also known affectionately as Gabo."			
Narcissus yepesii S.Ríos, D.Rivera, Alcaraz & Obón	Flowering plant	Narciso Yepes	A daffodil or narcissus endemic to Southern Spain, described in 1999 and "named in memory of the recently deceased concert guitar player and world famous musician Narciso Yepes, born in Lorca (Murcia), roughly 100 km east of the species' type locality."			
Nausicaamantis miyazakii Mériguet, 2018	Mantis	Hayao Miyazaki	"This species is dedicated to the creator of the work Nausicaä of the Valley of the Wind, Hayao Miyazaki. The author, sensitive to our environment, places nature at the centre of several of his works." The genus Nausicaamantis, created concurrently "is dedicated to the manga Nausicaä of the Valley of the Wind (Kaze no tani no Naushika) by Hayao Miyazaki, published between 1982 and 1995 [...] In this ecological fable, the heroine, Nausicaä, a naturalist and benevolent character, explores the relationship between humans and a hostile nature in a universe where humanity is in its twilight. Insects play a central role." This species was described from a single specimen collected in Madagascar in 1906 (112 years before publication) and preserved in the National Museum of Natural History, France; its current conservation status is unknown and it may be extinct.			
Neacomys vargasllosai Hurtado & Pacheco, 2017	Rodent	Mario Vargas Llosa	"in tribute to Mario Vargas Llosa, Peruvian writer and Nobel Prize winner in Literature 2011. Mario Vargas Llosa was born in Arequipa, Peru (as did [the lead author]), and lived in Bolivia (as the current range of N. vargasllosai) the first years of his childhood until he returned back to Peru. He studied Law and Literature in the Universidad Nacional Mayor de San Marcos, alma mater of [the authors]"			
Neopalpa donaldtrumpi Nazari, 2017	Moth	Donald Trump	Named due to the resemblance of scales on the head of the moth to Trump's hairstyle			
Neoperla teresa Stark & Sivec, 2008	Stonefly	Teresa Heinz	"The species name [...] honors Teresa Heinz Kerry in recognition of her indomitable spirit, wise "opinions" and her strong support of environmental issues".			
Neopicobia hepburni Glowska & Laniecka, 2014	Mite	Audrey Hepburn	"This new species is dedicated to Audrey Hepburn, British actress and humanitarian, for her unique personality and charm."			
Neoplecostomus watersi Silva, Reia, Zawadzki & Roxo, 2019	Catfish	Roger Waters	A freshwater catfish from the Paraná River basin in Brazil, named "in honor [of] George Roger Waters, an English composer, singer and guitar player from the rock 'n' roll band Pink Floyd, for his talent as [a] musician and social awareness around [the] world, specially his brave concerns [with] Brazilian economic, social and politic[al] issues."			
Neotrichia bellinii Santos & Nessimian, 2009	Caddisfly	Hilderaldo Bellini	One of twelve Brazilian species of microcaddisflies named in commemoration of the 50th anniversary of the first FIFA World Cup won by Brazil (Sweden '58), after the eleven players that participated in the final match and the team coach. "This species is named in honor of Bellini (Hilderaldo Luiz Bellini), captain of the Brazilian soccer team of 1958."			
Neotrichia didii Santos & Nessimian, 2009	Caddisfly	Didi	One of twelve Brazilian species of microcaddisflies named in commemoration of the 50th anniversary of the first FIFA World Cup won by Brazil (Sweden '58), after the eleven players that participated in the final match and the team coach. "This species is named in honor of Didi (Valdir Pereira), midfielder of the Brazilian soccer team of 1958."			
Neotrichia djalmasantosi Santos & Nessimian, 2009	Caddisfly	Djalma Santos	One of twelve Brazilian species of microcaddisflies named in commemoration of the 50th anniversary of the first FIFA World Cup won by Brazil (Sweden '58), after the eleven players that participated in the final match and the team coach. "This species is named in honor of Djalma Santos (Dejalma dos Santos), attacking full-back of the Brazilian soccer team of 1958."			
Neotrichia garrinchai Santos & Nessimian, 2009	Caddisfly	Garrincha	One of twelve Brazilian species of microcaddisflies named in conmemoration of the 50th anniversary of the first FIFA World Cup won by Brazil (Sweden '58), after the eleven players that participated in the final match and the team coach. "This species is named in honor of Garrincha (Manoel Francisco dos Santos), right winger and forward of the Brazilian soccer team of 1958."			
Neotrichia gilmari Santos & Nessimian, 2009	Caddisfly	Gilmar	One of twelve Brazilian species of microcaddisflies named in conmemoration of the 50th anniversary of the first FIFA World Cup won by Brazil (Sweden '58), after the eleven players that participated in the final match and the team coach. "This new species is named in honor of Gilmar (Gilmar dos Santos Neves), goalkeeper of the Brazilian soccer team of 1958."			
Neotrichia niltonsantosi Santos & Nessimian, 2009	Caddisfly	Nílton Santos	One of twelve Brazilian species of microcaddisflies named in conmemoration of the 50th anniversary of the first FIFA World Cup won by Brazil (Sweden '58), after the eleven players that participated in the final match and the team coach. "This species is named in honor of Nilton Santos, attacking full-back of the Brazilian soccer team of 1958."			
Neotrichia orlandoi Santos & Nessimian, 2009	Caddisfly	Orlando	One of twelve Brazilian species of microcaddisflies named in conmemoration of the 50th anniversary of the first FIFA World Cup won by Brazil (Sweden '58), after the eleven players that participated in the final match and the team coach. "This species is named in honor of Orlando (Orlando Peçanha de Carvalho), defender of the Brazilian soccer team of 1958."			
Neotrichia pelei Santos & Nessimian, 2009	Caddisfly	Pelé	One of twelve Brazilian species of microcaddisflies named in conmemoration of the 50th anniversary of the first FIFA World Cup won by Brazil (Sweden '58), after the eleven players that participated in the final match and the team coach. "This species is named in honor of Pelé (Edson Arantes do Nascimento), center forward of the Brazilian soccer team of 1958."			
Neotrichia vavai Santos & Nessimian, 2009	Caddisfly	Vavá	One of twelve Brazilian species of microcaddisflies named in conmemoration of the 50th anniversary of the first FIFA World Cup won by Brazil (Sweden '58), after the eleven players that participated in the final match and the team coach. "This species is named in honor of Vavá (Edvaldo Izídio Neto), center forward of the Brazilian soccer team of 1958."			
Neotrichia zagalloi Santos & Nessimian, 2009	Caddisfly	Mário Zagallo	One of twelve Brazilian species of microcaddisflies named in conmemoration of the 50th anniversary of the first FIFA World Cup won by Brazil (Sweden '58), after the eleven players that participated in the final match and the team coach. "This species is named in honor of Zagallo (Mário Zagallo), left forward of the Brazilian soccer team of 1958."			
Neotrichia zitoi Santos & Nessimian, 2009	Caddisfly	Zito	One of twelve Brazilian species of microcaddisflies named in conmemoration of the 50th anniversary of the first FIFA World Cup won by Brazil (Sweden '58), after the eleven players that participated in the final match and the team coach. "This species is named in honor of Zito (José Ely de Miranda), defensive [midfielder] of the Brazilian soccer team of 1958."			
Neurigona susanrocesae Deocaris, Alinsug, Cabelin & Jose, 2024	Fly	Susan Roces	This species is endemic to The Philippines; its name "serves as a tribute to the illustrious legacy of Jesusa Sonora Poe, affectionately known as Susan Roces, the revered "Queen of Philippine Movies" [...]. Beyond her status as a celebrity, Roces exemplified modest living and philanthropy through her support of various charitable endeavors, including the Rivers of Living Water Catholic community, Carmelite Sisters, and the Movie Workers Welfare Foundation (Mowelfund). As the widow of presidential candidate Fernando Poe Jr. and the mother of Senator Grace Poe (19th Congress), Roces left an indelible mark on Philippine society. Her passing on 20 May 2022 at the age of 80 adds a poignant context to the naming of this new species in her honor."			
Norasaphus monroeae † Fortey & Shergold, 1984	Trilobite	Marilyn Monroe	Trilobite with an hourglass shaped glabella.			
Notiospathius johnlennoni De Jesús-Bonilla et al., 2011	Wasp	John Lennon	In honor of the 30th anniversary of Lennon's death			
Notogomphus maathaiae Clausnitzer & Dijkstra, 2005	Dragonfly	Wangarĩ Maathai	"Wangari Maathai, the Nobel Peace laureate for 2004 and the first African woman to be honoured with this prize, was rewarded for her tireless effort to protect Africa's natural environment through sustainable solutions for human development. She has focused on the protection of Africa's last remaining and fast shrinking forests, which led to the foundation of the Green Belt Movement. The Nobel Committee's choice for 2004 emphasizes the importance of the protection of the world's natural resources in the fight against poverty. Safeguarding forests and watersheds will not only benefit the livelihood of individual human beings, but also secure a peaceful future for mankind. We wish to acknowledge Wangari Maathai and her achievements by naming a forest dwelling odonate from Kenya in her honour"			
Nyssus loureedi Raven, 2015	Spider	Lou Reed				
Ocyolinus dimoui Chatzimanolis & Ashe, 2009	Beetle	Nikos Dimou				
Oecomys franciscorum Pardiñas et al., 2016	Rodent	Francisco Maldonado da Silva and Pope Francis	A species of rice rat described from specimens collected in the Humid Chaco of Argentina and "dedicated to 2 Franciscos: the surgeon Francisco Maldonado da Silva (San Miguel de Tucumán, 1592–Lima, 1639); and the current Pope of the Catholic Church, Francisco (Jorge Mario Bergoglio; Buenos Aires, 1936). Maldonado da Silva was persecuted and burned by the Inquisition because he defended his freedom to practice the Jewish religion. Pope Francisco is championing a powerful discourse of understanding and reconciliation; in addition, his Encyclical Laudato si' (the "Green Encyclical" 24 May 2015) is viewed as a strong document in defense of the environment. The conjunction of both "Franciscos" in this specific epithet reflects our hope for a more inclusive and peaceful world".			
Oenonites zappae † Eriksson, 1997	Polychaete worm	Frank Zappa	A fossil marine worm from the Silurian of Gotland, Sweden			
Ogyges handali Cano, 2014	Beetle	Schafik Handal	"Named in honor of Commander Dr. Schafik Handal, officially recognized as "Hijo Meritísimo de la Ciudad de San Salvador" ["Meritorious Son of the City of San Salvador"] and "Honor al Mérito Centroamericano" ["Central American Merit Honor"], for his efforts in favor of the peace in Central America."			
Olea hensoni Filho, Paulay, & Krug, 2019	Sea slug	Jim Henson	An ovivorous (egg-eating) species "named in honor of Jim Henson, creator of the muppets who educated and entertained generations of children while they ate their eggs for breakfast. As Kermit the Frog famously sang, "It's Not Easy Bein' Green," a fitting allusion to the one lineage of sacoglossans that evolved away from herbivory among their many green relatives."			
Oniketia akihitoi † Marramà, Giusberti & Carnevale, 2022	Fish	Akihito	A fossil goby from the Oligocene of Italy, whose name "honours Akihito, Emperor Emeritus of Japan and renowned ichthyologist, for his remarkable contributions to the study of extant gobies."			
Onocephala chicomendes Monné, Monné, Botero & Carelli, 2016	Beetle	Chico Mendes	A longhorn beetle known only from Itatiaia National Park, Brazil.			
Onocolus onete Viecelli, Daros, Labarque & Teixeira, 2026	Spider	Dona Onete	"The epithet is derived from the name of Ionete da Silveira Gama, better known as Dona Onete, a Brazilian singer and composer celebrated as the 'Queen of Carimbó.' This honors her cultural contributions to Pará, the state where the species was discovered."			
Ophiohamus georgemartini O'Hara & Harding, 2015	Brittle star	George R. R. Martin	"Named after the author, George R.R. Martin, because the large marginal disc spines of the new species look similar to the crown on the cover of his second book in the Game of Thrones series, A Clash of Kings."			
Ophiopetagno † Thuy, Eriksson & Numberger-Thuy, 2022	Brittle star	Joe Petagno	A fossil species from the Silurian of Gotland, Sweden, which "honours "heavy metal painter" Joe Petagno in recognition of his artistic talent and ability to integrate palaeontological imagery into his art pieces, to the enrichment of both the music scene and the world of science"			
Ophiopetagno bonzo † Thuy, Eriksson, Kutscher & Numberger-Thuy, 2024	Brittle star	John Bonham	A fossil species from the Silurian of Gotland, Sweden "named after John H. Bonham (RIP), also known as 'Bonzo', former drummer of rock band Led Zeppelin, for raising drumming in rock music to a new level."			
Ophiopetagno kansas † Thuy, Eriksson, Kutscher & Numberger-Thuy, 2024	Brittle star	Kansas	A fossil species from the Silurian of Gotland, Sweden "named after American rock band Kansas, for producing some of the most inspiring songs in the history of rock music, including "Carry On Wayward Son" and "Dust in the Wind"."			
Ophiopetagno paicei † Thuy, Eriksson & Numberger-Thuy, 2022	Brittle star	Ian Paice	A fossil species from the Silurian of Gotland, Sweden, which "honours Ian A. Paice, drummer of legendary rock band Deep Purple, one of the last common ancestors in heavy metal."			
Orbitestella dioi † Hybertsen & Kiel, 2018	Sea snail	Ronnie James Dio	A fossil species from the Eocene of Washington state, USA.			
Orcevia meinei Yu, Maddison & Zhang, 2023	Spider	Klaus Meine	"in honor of Klaus Meine, the frontman of the German band Scorpions; many classic rock songs he wrote accompanied the growth of the first author."			
Orcevia mercuryi Yu, Maddison & Zhang, 2023	Spider	Freddie Mercury	"in honor of Freddie Mercury (1946–1991), the leader of the British band "Queen". Many classic rock songs he wrote accompanied the growth of the first author."			
Orcevia qogyigyacani Yu & Zhang, 2024	Spider	Choekyi Gyaltsen, 10th Panchen Lama	This species, native to Tibet, was described by Chinese scientists and named "in honor of Losang Chinlä Lhünchub Qögyi Gyäcän, the 10th Panchen Lama, who made significant contributions to upholding the reunification of China and promoting internal unity in Xizang."			
Orectochilus orbisonorum Miller, Mazzoldi & Wheeler, 2008	Beetle	Roy Orbison and his widow Barbara Orbison	A species of whirligig beetle from India, which is distinctive for the contrast between its black hard upper carapace and white, translucent underbelly. "It almost looks like it's wearing a tuxedo," Wheeler said.			
Oreodera kawasae Santos-Silva, Van Roie & Jocqué, 2021	Beetle	Jeannette Kawas	A longhorn beetle from Honduras "named after Blanca Jeannette Kawas Fernández [...] in honor of her never-ending efforts to conserve the fauna and flora of Honduras. She co-established the Prolansate Foundation, which is still committed to protecting the environment while improving the quality of life of the local communities. Jeanette was murdered at her home in February 1995."			
Ornamentula miyazakii Minowa & Garraffoni, 2021	Hairyback worm	Hayao Miyazaki	"dedicated to animation director Hayao Miyazaki, a highly notorious animator and filmmaker. He animated the fantasy film Princess Mononoke, and illustrated the character Forest Spirit [...], that at nighttime turns [in]to Daidarabotchi, resembling the specimen".			
Ornodolomedes nicholsoni Raven & Hebron, 2018	Spider	Jack Nicholson	"in honour of Jack Nicholson, an actor who so brilliantly portrays diverse personalities."			
Orome deepi † Bauzá, Gelfo & López, 2019	Notoungulate (an extinct order of mammals)	Deep Purple	A fossil Henricosborniid from the Eocene of Argentina. "Named after the British rock band Deep Purple, and in allusion to Las Violetas Farm, the locality in which the holotype was found (Spanish violeta, purple)."			
Oxymorus johnprinei Borovec & Meregalli, 2020	Weevil	John Prine	"This species is named in memory of the late John Prine (1946–2020), American folk singer and songwriter who sadly passed away due to Coronavirus while we were completing this paper."			
Oxyurichthys heisei Pezold, 1998	Fish	Akihito	An arrowfin goby from the Pacific Ocean, commonly known as the ribbon goby; "The name heisei is Japanese for "peace succeeds" or "realized peace." This is the name of the era of Emperor Akihito. It was chosen to recognize the many contributions to gobioid systematics made by Emperor Akihito and members of the Laboratory of Ichthyology, Akasaka Imperial Palace, working under his direction."			
Pachygnatha zappa Bosmans & Bosselaers, 1994	Spider	Frank Zappa	An orb-weaver spider named "in honor of the twentieth century composer Frank Zappa (1941-1993), well known for both his serious and commercial music. The dark grey mark on the ventral side of the abdomen of the female of this species strikingly resembles the artist's legendary moustache."			
Pachyrhinosaurus perotorum † Hanelt et al., 2012	Dinosaur	Ross Perot and family	"In recognition of members of the Perot family (Margot and H. Ross Perot and their children), who have demonstrated a long history of supporting science and science education for the public."			
Paerticrinus arvosus † Wright & Toom, 2017	Sea lily	Arvo Pärt	A fossil species from the Silurian of Estonia, "Named after Arvo Pärt, an Estonian composer of classical and sacred music, including the violin concerto Tabula Rasa."			
Palaelodus haroldocontii † Agnolin, Álvarez Herrera, Rozadilla & Contreras, 2025	Bird	Haroldo Conti	A fossil Palaelodid from the Miocene of Argentina; "The specific epithet honours the writer and journalist Haroldo Conti (1925–1976), kidnapped and disappeared by the last Argentine dictatorship."			
Pandelleola resnikae Lehrer, 1996	Fly	Judith Resnik	Subsequently synonymised with Sarcophaga filia.			
Panjange thomi Huber, 2019	Spider	Thom Wainggai	A cellar spider native to West Papua.			
Paraboea bhumiboliana Triboun & Chuchan	Flowering plant	Bhumibol Adulyadej	A species of gesneriad native to Thailand. "The specific epithet refers to the collection locality in the Bhumibol Dam area in Lamphun and Tak Provinces in Thailand. The name also honours His Majesty King Bhumibol of Thailand who has taken a keen interest in the conservation of forests and the relationship between people and the environment. This species is dedicated to him on the occasion of his 84th Birthday." The plant was given the vernacular name "bhumibolin" (ภมพลนทร) by King Bhumibol himself.			
Paradonea presleyi Miller et al., 2012	Spider	Elvis Presley	A species of velvet spider named "in honor of Elvis Aaron Presley, king of rock and roll and subject of innumerable black velvet paintings."			
Paramacrobiotus sagani Daza, Caicedo, Lisi & Quiroga, 2017	Tardigrade	Carl Sagan	"This species is named after the astrophysicist and science communicator Carl Sagan, philosopher, and one of the greatest minds of the twentieth century."			
Paraplethopeltis helli † Adrain, Westrop, Karim & Landing 2014	Trilobite	Richard Hell				
Paraserica camillerii Ahrens, Fabrizi, & Liu, 2017	Beetle	Andrea Camilleri	"This new species is dedicated to the Sicilian writer, Andrea Camillieri [sic], whose books accompanied [the first author's] work on Chinese Sericini over all the years."			
Paratropis macca Tauber, Perafán & Pérez-Miles, 2025	Spider	Paul McCartney	"refers to the nickname of Sir Paul McCartney, creative motor of the legendary band The Beatles and an icon of contemporary culture."			
Parayoungia mclaughlini † Adrain, 1998	Trilobite	Murray McLauchlan	A fossil from the Silurian of Canada. McLauchlan's surname was misspelt in the paper where the species was described and named.			
Parnassius mnemosyne guccinii Sala & Bollino, 1992	Butterfly	Francesco Guccini	"Dedicated to Mr. Francesco Guccini, to whose songs the first author is ever tied."			
Peinaleopolynoe elvisi Hatch & Rouse, 2020	Polychaete worm	Elvis Presley	"named after the legendary King of Rock and Roll, Elvis Presley; the iridescent golden/pink elytra are reminiscent of the sparkly, sequined costumes he favored in his late career."			
Pelecium chrissquirei Orsetti & Lopes-Andrade, 2024	Beetle	Chris Squire	"in honor of the British musician Christopher Russell Edward Squire (1948–2015), known as Chris Squire, who was one of the founding members and bass player of the progressive rock band "Yes"".			
Penicillium reconvexovelosoi J.P. Andrade et al. (2019)	Fungus	Caetano Veloso	This mold was described from samples collected in Bahia, Brazil, and "named in honour of the artist Caetano Veloso, an icon of Brazilian culture in the struggle for freedom of expression mainly during the military dictatorship."			
Perirehaedulus richardsi † Adrain & Edgecombe, 1995	Trilobite	Keith Richards	Aegrotocatellus jaggeri was named concurrently to honor fellow Rolling Stones member Mick Jagger.			
Petroperla † Sroka, Staniczek & Kondratieff, 2018	Stonefly	The Rolling Stones	One of 2 genera and 7 species of fossil stoneflies found in Burmese amber, and named concurrently in 2018 after The Rolling Stones and its members on the occasion of Mick Jagger's 75th birthday (see also species in the genera Electroneuria, Lapisperla and Largusoperla). "Burmese amber is one of the oldest resins with insect inclusions, and stoneflies are one of the oldest pterygote lineages. What lies closer at hand than to link fossil stoneflies in ancient stones with the Rolling Stones and to name the new species after the members of the oldest and greatest Rock 'n' Roll Band in the world. The [...] new family and genera are named after 'the Stones', and all present and former members of the Rolling Stones are honoured with their own species.[...] The first part of the compound noun refers to the Rolling Stones and is derived from Latin 'petra', meaning 'stone', the second part 'perla', refers to the stonefly genus Perla."			
Petroperla mickjaggeri † Sroka, Staniczek & Kondratieff, 2018	Stonefly	Mick Jagger	One of 2 genera and 7 species of fossil stoneflies found in Burmese amber, and named concurrently in 2018 after The Rolling Stones and its members on the occasion of Mick Jagger's 75th birthday (see also species in the genera Electroneuria, Lapisperla and Largusoperla). "The name refers to Sir Mick Jagger, founding member, harmonica player, and lead singer of the Rolling Stones."			
Petula Clarke, 1971	Moth	Petula Clark				
Pheidole harrisonfordi Wilson, 2003	Ant	Harrison Ford	"Named in honor of Harrison Ford, in recognition of his outstanding contribution in service and support to tropical conservation, hence the habitats in which the Pheidole ants will continue to exist."			
Pheidole mooreorum Wilson, 2003	Ant	Gordon Moore and Betty Moore	Named "in recognition of their outstanding contribution in service and support to tropical conservation, hence the habitats in which the Pheidole ants will continue to exist."			
Phelister chicomendesi Caterino & Tishechkin, 2020	Beetle	Chico Mendes	A clown beetle from Brazil.			
Phialella zappai Boero, 1987	Jellyfish	Frank Zappa	Named as a plan by the author to meet Zappa, who stated "There is nothing I'd like better than having a jellyfish named after me".			
Philautus mooreorum Meegaskumbura & Manamendra-Arachchi, 2005	Frog	Gordon Moore and Betty Moore	"honouring the benefactors of the Moore Foundation, Dr. Gordon and Betty Moore (b. California, 1929 and 1928, respectively), in appreciation of their support of the Global Amphibian Assessment and decades of philanthropic work in science and conservation." Subsequently transferred to genus Pseudophilautus.			
Pholcus bikilai Huber, 2011	Spider	Abebe Bikila	A cellar spider native to Ethiopia.			
Pholcus kingi Huber, 2011	Spider	Martin Luther King Jr.	A cellar spider native to Tennessee, USA.			
Pholcus lilangai Huber, 2011	Spider	George Lilanga	A cellar spider native to Tanzania.			
Pholcus sudhami Huber, 2011	Spider	Pira Sudham	A cellar spider native to Thailand. Subsequently transferred to genus Cantikus.			
Phrixotrichus jara Perafán & Pérez-Miles, 2014	Spider	Víctor Jara	A tarantula from Chile, named "as a recognition to Victor Jara, famous Chilean singer who was killed in 1973, during the government of the dictator Augusto Pinochet."			
Phylloscopus emilsalimi Rheindt et al., 2020	Bird	Emil Salim	A leaf warbler from Taliabu island in Indonesia, named "after Prof Emil Salim, former Minister of Environment of the Republic of Indonesia and eminent environmentalist whose actions have contributed to more stringent international guidelines regulating extractive industries and mining, thereby benefitting many countries' natural communities, including Indonesia."			
Physalaemus claptoni Leal et al., 2020	Frog	Eric Clapton				
Pikelinia floydmuraria Villarreal et al., 2026	Spider	Pink Floyd	The species name is "derived from "Floyd" (honoring the band Pink Floyd) and "muraria" (from Latin mūrus, wall), alluding to both the album The Wall and the species' wall-dwelling habitat."			
Pinkfloydia Dimitrov & Hormiga, 2011	Spider	Pink Floyd	"Pink Floyd was an innovative group that created music (with) an eclectic mixture of styles. Pinkfloydia has very unusual morphological features and its name aims to reflect its uniqueness."			
Pleurothallis hawkingii Karremans & J.E.Jiménez	Orchid	Stephen Hawking	"Honouring the English theoretical physicist, cosmologist and author Stephen William Hawking, who passed away the day this manuscript was submitted, 14 March 2018."			
Platygobiopsis akihito Springer & Randall, 1992	Fish	Akihito				
Pliotoxaster donaldtrumpi † Thompson, 2020	Sea urchin	Donald Trump	A fossil species from the Cretaceous of Texas, USA.			
Podistra kloevedali † Fanti & Damgaard, 2018	Beetle	Troels Kløvedal	A fossil soldier beetle found in Eocene Baltic amber, "named in honour of the Danish pioneer, longtime sailor, author and lecturer Troels Kløvedal (born Troels Beha Erichsen), in recognition of his trips with the Nordkaperen ship."			
Podocotyle nimoyi † Blend, Dronen & Armstrong, 2016	Fluke	Leonard Nimoy	A marine fluke that parasitises grenadiers in the Gulf of Mexico. "named in honor of the passing of Leonard Nimoy, an actor in the Star Trek television series and movies. His fictional character, Mr. Spock, and his career strongly influenced one of us in childhood to pursue a career in science."			
Poecilipta elvis Raven, 2015	Spider	Elvis Presley	"The species epithet is from Elvis Presley (1935–1977), rock star, whose curl of hair resembled the terminal curl of the male palpal embolus"			
Polycheles martini Ahyong & Brown, 2002	Crustacean	Brian Martin	A species described from specimens collected off the coast of New South Wales, Australia, and "Named in honour of Brian Martin, University of Wollongong, New South Wales, for his contributions on power and suppression in science."			
Polymeridium fernandoi Aptroot & Weerakoon (2018)	Fungus	Merrill J. Fernando	"This new species honours the founder of Dilmah Conservation Mr. Meril J. Fernando [sic] who has funded lichen research projects conducted in Sri Lanka in 2015 and 2017, including the publication of "Fascinating Lichens of Sri Lanka"."			
Polyzonus bhumiboli Skale, 2018	Beetle	Bhumibol Adulyadej	"Named after the King of Thailand Bhumibol Adulyadej who died on October 13, 2016."			
Potamon bhumibol Naiyanetr, 2001	Crustacean	Bhumibol Adulyadej	A freshwater crab from Thailand, named "in honour of His Majesty King Bhumibol Adulyadej at the occasion of His Majesty's 72nd birthday, as a token of respect and recognition of the great interest shown by His Majesty in the natural history and conservation of wildlife in Thailand. His Majesty the King graciously permitted the use of His name for this remarkable and most interesting species, which is the largest species of freshwater crab known from Thailand."; Subsequently transferred to genus Indochinamon.			
Predatoroonops schwarzeneggeri Brescovit, Rheims & Ott, 2012	Spider	Arnold Schwarzenegger	The generic name Predatoroonops "is a contraction of "Predator Oonops," taken from the science-fiction action movie Predator. The name refers the fact that all species show the frontal area of the male chelicerae with modified structures that resemble the face of the Predator character [...]. It is also a homage to the 25th anniversary of this blockbuster success." Schwarzenegger is the star of the film.			
Predatoroonops stani Pereira & Labarque, 2021	Spider	Stan Winston	The specific name honors Stanley "Stan" Winston, responsible for the visual effects in the movie Predator of 1987, a category in which the movie was nominated for an Oscar in 1988."			
Preseucoela imallshookupis Buffington, 2004	Wasp	Elvis Presley	The genus name derives from Presley's last name, while the specific name derives from Presley's song "All Shook Up".			
Priolepis akihitoi Hoese & Larson, 2010	Fish	Akihito	"Named for the Emperor of Japan, Akihito, for his significant and innovative contributions to the systematics of gobioid fishes." "This species is known under the name Koku-ten-benkeihaze in Japan and Emperor Reefgoby in Australia."			
Pristimantis chomskyi Páez & Ron, 2019	Frog	Noam Chomsky	"a patronym for Noam Chomsky, US-born theoretical linguist and one of the most cited modern scholars. Chomsky is the founder of modern linguistics. He developed the concept of "universal grammar," an innate cognitive capacity, shared by all humans, which allows to learn and communicate through complex speech".			
Pristimantis ledzeppelin Brito-Zapata & Reyes-Puig, 2021	Frog	Led Zeppelin	"The name honours Led Zeppelin and their extraordinary music. Led Zeppelin was a British rock band formed in London in 1968, one of the most influential bands throughout the 1970s, and progenitors of both hard rock and heavy metal"			
Prophorostoma tomjobimi Nihei, 2006	Fly	Antônio Carlos Jobim	Described from specimens collected in Rio de Janeiro state, Brazil, and named "in homage to the great musician and composer Tom Jobim (1927-1994)"			
Propionibacterium acnes type zappae Campisano et al., 2014	Bacterium	Frank Zappa	"This bacterium is so unconventional in its behavior, and its new habitat is so unexpected that we thought of Frank Zappa".			
Protognathinus spielbergi † Chalumeau & Brochier, 2001	Beetle	Steven Spielberg	A fossil stag beetle from the Eocene, found at the Messel pit, Germany. "We are pleased to dedicate this exceptional species to the director Stephen [sic] Spielberg, whose film Jurassic Park contributed to the revival of interest in the earth's ancient past."			
Prunum quini Ortea & Espinosa, 2018	Sea snail	Quini	"Dedicated to Quini (Enrique Castro) in heartfelt tribute to "the sorcerer", a master of soccer and a great human being", "Named in honour of Quini [...], a football sage and a good person of the generation of the authors, who passed away on a sad day of February leaving us his spirit, his legend and a rallying cry for ever: Now Quini now, now Quini... GOOOAL, from heaven." This species was found in Havana, a city twinned with Gijón, Quini's adoptive hometown; it was also found to share the same habitats as Prunum gijon, which is named after Gijón.			
Psalikilopsis newmani † Adrain, McAdams, Westrop & Karim, 2011	Trilobite	Paul Newman				
Psalikilopsis redfordi † Adrain, McAdams, Westrop & Karim, 2011	Trilobite	Robert Redford				
Psathyrella pivae Heykoop, G. Moreno & M. Mata (2019)	Fungus	Alfio Piva	This species was described from specimens collected in Costa Rica and "Named for Dr Alfio Piva, former Director of the INBio and ex vice-president of the Republic of Costa Rica, recognising his contribution to the conservation of biodiversity."			
Psephophorus terrypratchetti † Kohler, 1995	Turtle	Terry Pratchett	A fossil species of marine turtle from the Eocene of New Zealand. "In honour of the British novelist Terry Pratchett, whose wonderful style and great sense of humour, combined with his deep affection for turtles, merits the naming of this new species after him". Pratchett wrote a series of fantasy books set on a world carried on the back of a giant turtle.			
Pseudapanteles alfiopivai Fernández-Triana & Whitfield, 2014	Wasp	Alfio Piva	"in recognition of his many years of administrative support to ... INBio ... and of his policy efforts on behalf of conserving biodiversity in Costa Rica."			
Pseudapanteles margaritapenonae Fernández-Triana & Whitfield, 2014	Wasp	Margarita Penón	"who listened patiently ... and thereby set the process in motion that protects all of these wasps and hundreds of thousands of other ACG species."			
Pseudapanteles oscarariasi Fernández-Triana & Whitfield, 2014	Wasp	Óscar Arias	"who, upon listening to Margarita Penon's summary of the ACG concept in 1986, set ACG survival policy in motion"			
Pseudharpinia bonhami Andrade & Senna, 2020	Crustacean	John Bonham	One of four species of amphipods named concurrently after the members of Led Zeppelin. "Named after John Bonham (1948–1980), drummer of the band Led Zeppelin, who inspired many generations of musicians with his outstanding talent and unique way of playing."			
Pseudharpinia jonesyi Andrade & Senna, 2020	Crustacean	John Paul Jones (musician)	One of four species of amphipods named concurrently after the members of Led Zeppelin. "Named after John Paul Jones, artistic name of John Richard Baldwin also known as Jonesy, bassist/keyboardist of the band Led Zeppelin, as a homage to his brilliance and contributions to music as a multi-instrumentalist."			
Pseudharpinia pagei Andrade & Senna, 2020	Crustacean	Jimmy Page	One of four species of amphipods named concurrently after the members of Led Zeppelin. "Named after Jimmy Page, artistic name of James Patrick Page, guitarist and founder of the band Led Zeppelin, considered one of the most influential guitarists in the world, inspiring not only musicians but we both authors during scientific discussions."			
Pseudharpinia planti Andrade & Senna, 2020	Crustacean	Robert Plant	One of four species of amphipods named concurrently after the members of Led Zeppelin. "Named after Robert Plant, artistic name of Robert Anthony Plant, lead singer of the band Led Zeppelin and owner of one of the greatest voices in the world."			
Pseudocorinna brianeno Jocqué & Bosselaers, 2011	Spider	Brian Eno	A corinnid sac spider from West Africa, named "for Brian P.G. St. Jean de la Salle Eno, all-round artist and pioneer of minimal and ambient music, who revolutionized popular music in many ways."			
Pseudoloxops harrisonfordi Balukjian & Van Dam, 2024	True bug	Harrison Ford	A leaf bug from Tahiti, "named in honor of actor Harrison Ford, whose commitment to environmental protection has helped conserve natural resources around the world."			
Pseudotanais monroeae Jakiel, Palero & Błażewicz, 2020	Crustacean	Marilyn Monroe				
Ptomaphagus thebeatles Schilthuizen, Latella & Njunjić, 2020	Beetle	The Beatles	The holotype of this beetle was collected from Vondelpark, in Amsterdam (Netherlands). "Named for the band The Beatles, which no beetle has yet been named after. (Note: This statement is incorrect; the leaf beetle Janbechynea georgepauljohnringo, also on this list, had been named in 2004, but the author was not aware of it) The name also commemorates the 'Bed in for Peace' by John Lennon and Yoko Ono in the nearby Hilton Hotel [of Amsterdam], exactly 50 years (to the day) prior to the collection date of the holotype."			
Pyropyga julietafierroae Gutiérrez-Carranza & Zaragoza-Caballero, 2023	Firefly	Julieta Fierro	This species was described from specimens collected in Mexico City. "The species is dedicated to Dr Julieta Fierro Gossman. [...] Dr Fierro is a Mexican scientist renowned for her extensive career in physics and astrophysics studies, as well as being a passionate science communicator. The epithet was proposed and selected by public participation through the call for entries "Name a new species of firefly" with the theme "Illustrious Mexican Women" during the Second Firefly Festival Mexico."			
Quadrophenia daltreyi Rifkind, 2017	Beetle	Roger Daltrey	One of four species of checkered beetles named concurrently after the members of The Who. The genus Quadrophenia was also created concurrently, and named after The Who's concept album.			
Quadrophenia entwistlei Rifkind, 2017	Beetle	John Entwistle	One of four species of checkered beetles named concurrently after the members of The Who.			
Quadrophenia mooni Rifkind, 2017	Beetle	Keith Moon	One of four species of checkered beetles named concurrently after the members of The Who.			
Quadrophenia townshendi Rifkind, 2017	Beetle	Pete Townshend	One of four species of checkered beetles named concurrently after the members of The Who.			
Radiolichas davedaviesi † Adrain & Ramsköld, 1996	Trilobite	Dave Davies	One of two species named concurrently after the two permanent members of The Kinks.			
Radiolichas raydaviesi † Adrain & Ramsköld, 1996	Trilobite	Ray Davies	One of two species named concurrently after the two permanent members of The Kinks.			
Rafflesia azlanii Latiff & M.Wong	Flowering plant	Azlan Shah of Perak	"The species name is in honor of HRH Paduka Seri Sultan Perak, Sultan Azlan Shah, the patron of the Malaysian Nature Society Heritage and Scientific Expedition to Belum. Populations are known from Perak and Pahang states of peninsular Malaysia."			
Ramazzottius kretschmanni Guidetti et al., 2022	Tardigrade	Winfried Kretschmann	"The species is dedicated to Winfried Kretschmann, the political mastermind and founder of the Black Forest National Park." (the type locality)			
Ranzania zappai † Carnevale, 2007	Fish	Frank Zappa	A species of fossil slender sunfish from the Miocene of Torricella Peligna, Italy.			
Retrooecobius chomskyi † Wunderlich, 2015	Spider	Noam Chomsky	A fossil species of disc web spider found in Cretaceous Burmese amber. "This peculiar spider species is named in honour [of] Noam Chomsky, who – according to the New York Times – is probably the most important and influential living intellectual human and an excellent social critic. In my opinion Chomsky's view of anarchism makes sense in a world full of corrupt, inhuman and criminal political, economic and religious leaders. [...] This many-sided author compared also excellently the evolution of languages with the evolution of animals."			
Rhabdopectella pratchetti Domingos, Kersken, Schuster & Xavier, 2026	Sponge	Terry Pratchett	"The first author would like to name this new species as pratchetti in honor of Sir Terry Pratchett. His fantastic literary work had a huge impact on [his] life, not only making him laugh in difficult times, but also teaching him valuable humanistic lessons. "Things that try to look like things often do look more like things than things." ― Terry Pratchett, Wyrd Sisters."			
Rhinatrema gilbertogili Maciel, Sampaio, Hoogmoed & Schneider, 2018	Caecilian	Gilberto Gil	A species from Brazil, named "in homage to the Brazilian musician (singer and composer), Gilberto Passos Gil Moreira, better known as "Gilberto Gil" (born in 1942), in recognition of his great contributions to Brazilian music. "Aqui e agora," "Drão," "Esotérico," "Estrela," "Palco," and "Tempo Rei" are some of the most beautiful songs produced by Gilberto Gil. The artist is also known for participating in environmental protection projects."			
Rhipidura habibiei Rheindt et al., 2020	Bird	B. J. Habibie	A fantail endemic to Peleng island in Indonesia, named "in honor of the late Bacharuddin Jusuf Habibie (deceased 11 Sep 2019), the third president of the Republic of Indonesia. President Habibie was known as a keen environmentalist and contributed greatly to the science and conservation of nature in Indonesia."			
Rhodinia tenzingyatsoi Naumann, 2001	Moth	Tenzin Gyatso, 14th Dalai Lama	This species is native to Tibet.			
Roa rumsfeldi Rocha et al., 2017	Fish	Donald Rumsfeld	A butterflyfish from the Philippines, named "to honor Donald Rumsfeld who immortalized the quote: "there are known knowns; there are things we know we know. We also know there are known unknowns; that is to say we know there are some things we do not know. But there are also unknown unknowns – the ones we don't know we don't know." He said that when referring to the uncertainties of war, but we think it applies perfectly to the taxonomy of MCE species: We only realized this species was new after we took a good look at it here at the [Steinhart] aquarium in San Francisco, so we think it's a perfect example of an unknown unknown."			
Romblonella coryae General & Buenavente, 2015	Ant	Corazón Aquino	A species from the Philippines, "named in honor of our late former President, Corazon C. Aquino (known to all Filipinos by her nickname "Cory"), who led the country out of the dictatorship era. It is fitting that a genus named after a Philippine island (Romblon) has a species named after a modern Filipino hero."			
Rustitermes boteroi Constantini, Castro & Scheffrahn, 2020	Termite	Fernando Botero				
Sabbathichthys † Calzoni, Giusberti & Carnevale, 2026	Fish	Black Sabbath	A genus of fossil lightfishes from the Eocene of Italy, "named after the British rock band "Black Sabbath", and the Greek word "ἰχθύς" meaning fish."			
Sabbathichthys osbournei † Calzoni, Giusberti & Carnevale, 2026	Fish	Ozzy Osbourne	"Species name dedicated to Ozzy Osbourne (1948-2025), frontman of the British heavy metal band Black Sabbath, who passed away during the preparation of this paper."			
Sacoproteus browni Krug et al., 2018	Sea slug	Bob Brown	A species from Australia "Named in honor of Robert James "Bob" Brown, former Parliamentary Leader of the Australian Greens, for his life's work fighting to protect the environment and to achieve equality for all people regardless of sexual orientation."			
Salinoctomys loschalchalerosorum Mares, Braun, Barquez & Diaz, 2000	Rodent	Los Chalchaleros	The researcher in charge of the naming stated that he named the new species after Los Chalchaleros because his crews had sung their songs during thirty years of field research across Argentina. Subsequently transferred to genus Tympanoctomys.			
Sanaungulus christensenae † Fanti & Damgaard, 2019	Beetle	Inger Christensen	A fossil soldier beetle found in Cretaceous Burmese amber.			
Sanaungulus ghitaenoerbyae † Fanti, Damgaard & Ellenberger 2018	Beetle	Ghita Nørby	A fossil soldier beetle found in Cretaceous Burmese amber, "named in honor of the Danish actress Ghita Nørby, as thank[s] for decades (over 60 years: 1956-today) of contributions to the Danish theater and film scene."			
Sanaungulus troelsikloevedali † Fanti & Damgaard, 2019	Beetle	Troels Kløvedal	A fossil soldier beetle found in Cretaceous Burmese amber, named "In honor of the Danish pioneer, longtime sailor, author and lecturer Troels Kløvedal."			
Sarcoglottis wernerherzogii Collantes, Edquén & Salazar	Orchid	Werner Herzog	A species described from specimens collected in Machu Picchu and Choquequirao, Peru, and "named in honor of the great poet and filmmaker Werner Herzog (Munich, 1942), whose iconic films Aguirre, the Wrath of God (1972) and Fitzcarraldo (1982) reveal the natural magnificence of Machupicchu and the Peruvian Amazon."			
Scaphochlamys abdullahii Y.Y.Sam & Saw	Flowering plant	Abdullah Ahmad Badawi	A relative of ginger endemic to Peninsular Malaysia, "named in honour of the Prime Minister of Malaysia, Datuk Seri Abdullah Ahmad Badawi, for his strong interest in nature conservation and protection of the environment."			
Scinax fontanarrosai Baldo et al., 2019	Frog	Roberto Fontanarrosa	A species of tree frog from Argentina, "named in honor [of] the writer and cartoonist Roberto "El Negro" Fontanarrosa (1944–2007), in recognition of his vast contribution to the Argentinean culture. His work always included elements of nature, like the amphibians."			
Scinax ritaleeae Marinho, Faivovich, Haddad & Araujo-Vieira, 2024	Frog	Rita Lee	This species is native to Brazil; "Rita Lee Jones de Carvalho, known as Rita Lee, was a Brazilian rock singer whose lyrics criticized the conservative, far-right, military dictatorship of the Brazilian government, which lasted from 1964 to 1985. She was a feminist activist, an ally of the LGBTQIAPN+ movement, and an environmentalist. Notably, Rita Lee is famous for her musical compositions and for her red-dyed hair, the latter trait considered unusual in her time. The reddish blotches in the iris of the new species are also an uncommon characteristic when compared to its congeners in the S. granulatus group. In this sense, we propose the new species epithet honoring the Queen of Brazilian rock music."			
Scutacarus shajariani Sobhi & Hajiqanbar, 2017	Mite	Mohammad-Reza Shajarian	A parasitic mite found in Iran, and "named in honor of Mr. Mohammadreza Shajarian, the living legend of Persian traditional music."			
Scytodes coltranei Iost, Alayón & Rheims, 2025	Spider	John Coltrane	"The specific name is a patronym honoring the late American jazz saxophonist, band leader and composer John Coltrane (23 September 1926–17 July 1967), known for his major influence on genres such as Bebop, Modal Jazz and Hard Bop, and for his pioneering work at the forefront of Free Jazz."			
Scytodes harrisoni Iost, Alayón & Rheims, 2025	Spider	George Harrison	"The specific name is a patronym honoring the late British musician George Harrison (25 February 1943 – 29 November 2001), best known as the lead guitarist of The Beatles. He was also recognized for his contributions to music as a solo artist and for his interest in Indian culture and spirituality."			
Scytodes jimmorrisoni Iost, Alayón & Rheims, 2025	Spider	Jim Morrison	"The specific name is a patronym honoring the late musician and poet Jim Morrison (8 December 1943–3 July 1971), lead singer of the American rock band The Doors, known for his distinctive voice, lyrical writing, and influence on rock music and counterculture."			
Scytodes joniae Iost, Alayón & Rheims, 2025	Spider	Joni Mitchell	"The specific name is a matronym honoring the Canadian singer-songwriter Joni Mitchell, known for her influential work in folk, jazz, and pop music, and for her complex compositions and poetic lyrics."			
Scytodes nicksae Iost, Alayón & Rheims, 2025	Spider	Stevie Nicks	"The specific name is a matronym honoring American singer and songwriter Stevie Nicks, known for her work as a solo artist and as a member of Fleetwood Mac, and recognized for her distinctive voice, lyrical style, and influence on rock music."			
Scytodes ritae Iost, Alayón & Rheims, 2025	Spider	Rita Lee	"The specific name is a matronym honoring the late Brazilian singer, songwriter, and multi-instrumentalist Rita Lee (31 December 1947 – 8 May 2023), known as the "Queen of Brazilian Rock." She was a founding member of the band Os Mutantes and a key figure in the Tropicália movement, with a long solo career marked by innovation and cultural impact."			
Scytodes sabbath Iost, Alayón & Rheims, 2025	Spider	Black Sabbath	"The specific name honors the British heavy metal band Black Sabbath, formed in Birmingham in 1968 and widely regarded as the pioneers of heavy metal. Known for their dark themes and heavy riffs, the band concluded their career with a farewell concert, titled Back to the Beginning, at Villa Park, Birmingham, on July 2025, featuring the original lineup and numerous guest artists."			
Serpula alicecooperi † Kočí, Milàn, Jakobsen & Bashforth, 2024	Polychaete worm	Alice Cooper	A fossil species from the Jurassic of Denmark, named "In honor of musician Alice Cooper for his lifelong dedication to music as a performing artist." "his music has been firmly playing in the background during much of my research", added one of the authors.			
Shuilingornis angelai † Wang et al., 2025	Bird	Piero Angela	A fossil gansuid euornithean from the Cretaceous Jiufotang Formation of China. "The species name honors the Italian journalist and science writer Piero Angela (1928-2022) for his extraordinary contribution to the popularization of scientific knowledge and the promotion of rational thinking."			
Sisicus volutasilex Dupérré & Paquin, 2007	Spider	The Rolling Stones	"The epithet is formed by the contraction of volutabundus, a, um: rolling, and silex: pebble/stone, because the shape of the epigynum closely resembles the tongue logo used by the rock band the Rolling Stones."			
Socca elvispresleyi Framenau, Castanheira & Vink, 2022	Spider	Elvis Presley	An Australian orb-weaver spider named "in honour of the late Elvis Aaron Presley (1935–1977), an iconic American singer and actor and known as 'the King of Rock and Roll', due to some resemblance of the apical lobe of the terminal apophysis of the male pedipalp to his pompadour tuft, a haircut very common in the 1950s and a very characteristic feature of Elvis."			
Socca johnnywarreni Framenau, Castanheira & Vink, 2022	Spider	Johnny Warren	An Australian orb-weaver spider named "honouring the late Johnny Warren MBE, OAM (1943–2004), who was an Australian international soccer player, but also coach, administrator, writer and broadcaster who was instrumental in bringing 'The World Game' to a wider audience in Australia. He played 42 international matches for Australia, including 24 as a team captain and also played in Australia's first world cup in Germany in 1974." Genus Socca is named after the game of soccer.			
Socca levyashini Framenau, Castanheira & Vink, 2022	Spider	Lev Yashin	An Australian orb-weaver spider named "honouring the 'Black Spider', the late Lev Yashin (1929–1990), one of the greatest goalkeepers football has ever seen. He played 78 games for the Soviet Union's soccer team, winning the 1956 Olympic Games [held in Melbourne, Australia] and the first European championship, the 1960 European Nations' Cup." Genus Socca is named after the game of soccer.			
Solaropsis chicomendesi Cuezzo & Fernández, 2001	Snail	Chico Mendes				
Solibacillus kalamii Checinska Sielaff et al., 2017	Bacterium	A. P. J. Abdul Kalam	This bacterium was isolated from a HEPA filter used on board the International Space Station, where it had been in service for 40 months. The filter was later analysed at the Jet Propulsion Laboratory (JPL), the foremost lab of NASA for work on interplanetary travel. The bacterium was named in honour of Abdul Kalam, who was a renowned aerospace scientist and who had received some early training at NASA in 1963.			
Spermophora awalai Huber, 2014	Spider	Mongo Beti	A cellar spider species native to Cameroon, "Named for the Cameroonian writer Alexandre Biyidi Awala (1932-2001), known as Mongo Beti."			
Spermophora maathaiae Huber & Warui, 2012	Spider	Wangarĩ Maathai	A cellar spider from Kenya, "named in honor of Prof. Wangari Maathai, founder of the Green Belt Movement and first African woman to win the Nobel peace prize."			
Sphaeropthalma mankelli Pitts, 2010	Wasp	Henning Mankell	A velvet ant from the Colorado Desert, California, "Named in honor of Henning Mankell [...], who is a renowned Swedish crime writer that is best known for his detective novels involving Inspector Kurt Wallander."			
Spintharus berniesandersi Agnarsson & Sargeant, 2018	Spider	Bernie Sanders	A cobweb spider native to Cuba, described by scientists of the University of Vermont; "The species epithet honours the great Vermont senator Bernie Sanders, a tireless fighter for human rights and equality, and environmentally aware social democracy."			
Spintharus davidbowiei Agnarsson & Chomitz, 2018	Spider	David Bowie	"The species epithet honours the great artist David Bowie who passed away prematurely in 2016, but whose music will continue to inspire the generations to come."			
Spygoria zappania † Salak & Lescinsky, 1999	Ediacaran biota	Frank Zappa	A fossil Cloudinid from the Early Cambrian of Nevada, USA. "The specific name honors the late Frank Zappa, musician, composer, politician, whose mission paralleled that of the earliest paleontologists: to challenge conventional and traditional beliefs when such beliefs lacked roots in logic and reason."			
Stegophiura miyazakii † Ishida et al., 2018	Brittle star	Hayao Miyazaki	A fossil species from the Cretaceous of Japan, "Named in honour of Hayao Miyazaki, co-founder of Studio Ghibli, an animation studio in Japan, to pay tribute to his anime lifework, in particular the masterpiece Ponyo that celebrates marine biodiversity. In addition, Hayao Miyazaki's favourite novelist, Soseki Natsume, lived in Kumamoto Prefecture, where the new ophiuroid fossils were found."			
Stenetra miyazakii Tselikh & Burks, 2020	Wasp	Hayao Miyazaki				
Stephenympha Viloria, 2022	Butterfly	Henry Stephen	A genus from Venezuela "named in remembrance of the internationally renowned Venezuelan musician, actor, composer and extraordinary singer, Henry Stephen".			
Stephenympha pauliana Viloria, 2022	Butterfly	Paul McCartney	"This new species is named after Paul McCartney [...], an animal rights advocate, but best known and celebrated as a highly creative and original songwriter, singer and musician. His remarkable artistic work has achieved an unprecedented cultural impact worldwide over the last sixty years."			
Stigmatomma pagei Hamer, Pierce & Guénard, 2023	Ant	Jimmy Page	"named after the guitarist of the rock band Led Zeppelin and acclaimed guitar hero, James Patrick Page, known as Jimmy Page. While Jimmy Page wanted to become a biologist as a child but turned into music instead, there is no doubt that he has inspired generations of biologists, including the authors of this work."			
Strepsicrates gattii Vargas-Ortiz & Vargas, 2018	Moth	Eduardo Gatti	A leafroller from the Atacama Desert, Chile, "dedicated to the great Eduardo Gatti for his outstanding contribution to Chilean popular music."			
Strumigenys ayersthey Booher & Hoenle, 2021	Ant	Jeremy Ayers	"In contrast to the traditional naming practices that identify individuals as one of two distinct genders, we have chosen a non-Latinized portmanteau [...] representing people that do not identify with conventional binary gender assignments [...]. The 'they' recognizes non-binary gender identifiers in order to reflect recent evolution in English pronoun use – 'they, them, their' and address a more inclusive and expansive understanding of non-neutral gender identification. Strumigenys ayersthey sp. nov. is thus inclusively named in honor of Jeremy Ayers for the multitude of humans among the spectrum of gender who have been unrepresented under traditional naming practices. Jeremy was a multifaceted and beloved Athens-based (GA, USA) artist and activist whose humanity and achievements defied the limits of categorized classification. Jeremy brought an intellectual and playful, Pan-like curiosity to every aspect of his life. He was a writer, philosopher, painter, musician, activist, photographer, gardener, and exploder of boundaries who transformed the culture that surrounded him. His deep appreciation of the variety and minute details of the natural world astounded all who knew him. In the spirit of Jeremy, we also propose that the -they suffix can be used for singular honorific names of non-binary identifiers in compliance with the ICZN."			
Struszia (Avalanchurus) lennoni † Edgecombe & Chatterton, 1993	Trilobite	John Lennon	One of four species concurrently named in 1993 after the members of The Beatles. Subgenus Avalanchurus was subsequently elevated to genus level.			
Struszia (Avalanchurus) starri † Edgecombe & Chatterton, 1993	Trilobite	Ringo Starr	One of four species concurrently named in 1993 after the members of The Beatles. Subgenus Avalanchurus was subsequently elevated to genus level.			
Struszia (Struszia) harrisoni † Edgecombe & Chatterton, 1993	Trilobite	George Harrison	One of four species concurrently named in 1993 after the members of The Beatles.			
Struszia mccartneyi † Edgecombe & Chatterton, 1993	Trilobite	Paul McCartney	One of four species concurrently named in 1993 after the members of The Beatles.			
Struszia epsteini † Adrain & Edgecombe, 1997	Trilobite	Brian Epstein	One of five species concurrently named in 1997 after people connected to The Beatles (See also Frammia).			
Struszia martini † Adrain & Edgecombe, 1997	Trilobite	George Martin	One of five species concurrently named in 1997 after people connected to The Beatles (See also Frammia).			
Struszia onoae † Adrain & Edgecombe, 1997	Trilobite	Yoko Ono	One of five species concurrently named in 1997 after people connected to The Beatles (See also Frammia).			
Struszia petebesti † Adrain & Edgecombe, 1997	Trilobite	Pete Best	One of five species concurrently named in 1997 after people connected to The Beatles (See also Frammia).			
Stygocapitella berniei Cerca, Meyer, Purschke & Struck, 2020	Polychaete worm	Bernie Sanders	"The species name reflects upon field collection. The field collection site is in a private property, and while collecting, the caretaker of the property mentioned we could collect sand as long as we would support a progressive such as Bernie Sanders. The species honours Bernie Sanders for his efforts of inclusiveness, diversity and protection of minorities and underrepresented groups."			
Stygocapitella josemariobrancoi Cerca, Meyer, Purschke & Struck, 2020	Polychaete worm	José Mário Branco	"The name honors José Mário Branco, an important Portuguese singer whose music inspired whole generations. JC was hearing his music in the field."			
Stygocapitella zecai Cerca, Meyer, Purschke & Struck, 2020	Polychaete worm	José Afonso	"While collecting in Henningsvær, JC was hearing Zeca Afonso, an important freedom fighter whose songs inspired generations. The name honors him."			
Suberea etiennei van Soest, Kaiser & Van Syoc, 2011	Sponge	Jean-Louis Étienne	"Named after Jean-Louis Etienne, the leader of the 2004/5 Expedition to Île Clipperton, who brought the significant collection of Clipperton sponges to the Muséum national d'Histoire naturelle, Paris." (this being one of those sponges).			
Sulawesidrobia abreui Zielske, Glaubrecht & Haase, 2011	Freshwater snail	José Antonio Abreu	"named after José Antonio Abreu, a Venezuelan composer and founder of El Sistema, a network which enables underprivileged children to get a musical education."			
Sulawesidrobia yunusi Zielske, Glaubrecht & Haase, 2011	Freshwater snail	Muhammad Yunus	"named after the Nobel Peace Prize Laureate Muhammad Yunus, a Bangladeshi economist and founder of Grameen Bank, which among other activities makes micro credits available for the foundation of small companies"			
Suturoglypta leali Espinosa & Ortea, 2018	Sea snail	Eusebio Leal	A species described from specimens collected from Havana Harbor in the mid-20th century, "named in honour of Dr. Eusebio Leal Spengler, Historian of the City of Havana, who is part of the city's history in his own right. Finding a new species, born of the bay's past, can have no better destiny than to bear the name of the man who has made Havana a different city in a uniform world."			
Suturoglypta orboniana Espinosa & Ortea, 2018	Sea snail	Julián Orbón	A species native to Cuba, "named after Julián Orbon (Avilés, 1925), a Spanish-Cuban musician who in 1958 adapted simple verses by José Martí to the melody of "La Guantanamera" [sic], composed in the 1930s by the popular musician Joseíto Fernández. From that moment on, the humble song reached a universal dimension."			
Syllipsimopodi bideni † Whalen & Landman, 2022	Cephalopod	Joe Biden	A fossil basal species from Carboniferous Bear Gulch Limestone, named "... to celebrate the recently inaugurated (at the time of submission) 46th President of the United States, Joseph R. Biden"			
Sylvilagus palustris hefneri Lazell, 1984	Rabbit	Hugh Hefner	Known as the Lower Keys marsh rabbit, this subspecies was "named for Hugh M. Hefner, whose corporation has generously supported field work on this and other species." Hefner's Playboy Enterprises famously has a rabbit as its logo.			
Synagelides walesai Bohdanowicz, 1987	Spider	Lech Wałęsa				
Synalpheus pinkfloydi Anker et al., 2017	Crustacean	Pink Floyd	"Named after the well-known British rock band Pink Floyd, inspired by the bright pink-red claw of the new species. Suggested vernacular name: Pink Floyd pistol shrimp."			
Tachymenoides harrisonfordi Lehr, Cusi, Fernandez, Vera & Catenazzi, 2023	Snake	Harrison Ford	"We dedicate this species to Harrison Ford, actor and conservationist, in recognition of his work for Conservation International and his voice for nature (e.g., 'Nature is speaking – Harrison Ford is The Ocean')."			
Taeniogonalos latae Polaszek & Binoy, 2022	Wasp	Lata Mangeshkar	A trigonalid wasp from India, named "after the Indian playback singer Lata Mangeshkar (1929–2022) known as the Nightingale of India, one of the greatest and most influential singers with a distinguished career spanning over seven decades. We dedicate the species to her memory, fondly remembering the timeless song "Lag Ja Gale" from the film Woh Kaun Thi (1964)."			
Taeniopteryx mercuryi Fochetti & Nicolai, 1996	Stonefly	Freddie Mercury	"The discoverer of this species (P. Nicolai) wishes that it will be named after the great singer and artist Freddie Mercury [...], who died prematurely in London in 1991. Dr. Nicolai, in such way, wishes to pay homage to him and to his musical work, with the certainty of awarding a kind of honour that Freddie has not yet received." (this was the first organism to be named after Mercury)			
Tanytarsus chicomendesi Dantas, Hamada & Gilka, 2023	Fly	Chico Mendes	"a tribute to Francisco Alves Mendes Filho, better known as "Chico Mendes", a Brazilian rubber tapper, trade union leader and environmentalist. He fought to preserve the Amazon rainforest and advocated for the human rights of Brazilian peasants and Indigenous peoples. Chico Mendes was born and lived in Acre, the same Brazilian state where the new species was found, and he was cowardly assassinated on 22 December 1988."			
Tapinothrix clintonii Bohunická & Johansen, 2011	Bacterium	Bill Clinton	"named in honor of President William Jefferson Clinton, in recognition of his efforts to provide protection for the ecosystems and landscapes now set aside in the Grand Staircase–Escalante National Monument." [where the specimens were collected]			
Tarkus squirei † Carnevale & Pietsch, 2011	Fish	Chris Squire	A fossil species of batfish from the Eocene deposits of Monte Bolca, Italy named "after the British musician and composer Christopher Russell Edward 'Chris' Squire, commonly known by his nickname 'Fish'". The genus Tarkus, created concurrently, "is taken from the suite released in 1971 by Keith Emerson, Greg Lake and Carl Palmer, which depicts Tarkus as an armoured half armadillo/half tank creature, [...] in reference to the thick dermal covering of bony tubercles that characterize this genus."			
Tarsozeuzera prashkevitchi Yakovlev, 2020	Moth	Gennadiy Prashkevich	A carpenter moth from Sulawesi described by a Russian scientist.			
Technomyrmex montaseri Sharaf, Collingwood & Aldawood, 2011	Ant	Salah Montaser	Montaser was a personal friend of the lead author.			
Telescopus wangariae Ribeiro-Júnior et al., 2025	Snake	Wangarĩ Maathai	This spacies is native to the East African Rift and named "honoring Wangari Muta Maathai (1940, Ihithe–2011, Nairobi). She was the first woman to earn a doctorate degree in East and Central Africa, becoming chair of the Department of Veterinary Anatomy at the University of Nairobi. Wangari Maathai was internationally recognized for her persistent struggle for democracy and environmental conservation, and received numerous awards, most notably the 2004 Nobel Peace Prize"			
Teresirogas williamsi Quicke & van Achterberg, 2014	Wasp	Fred Williams (artist)	An Australian parasitoid wasp "Named after the Australian painter Fred Williams (1927–1982), well known for his evocative paintings of the Australian landscape."			
Testudacarus dennetti O'Neill & Dowling, 2016	Mite	Daniel Dennett	"after Daniel Clement Dennett III, the American philosopher, writer, and cognitive scientist. Dennett's work has been the focus of many late night debates in close social circles just as he adds the necessary philosophical spice to the New Athiests [sic]."			
Testudacarus hitchensi O'Neill & Dowling, 2016	Mite	Christopher Hitchens	"after the late Christopher Eric Hitchens, the English author, journalist, and literary critic. As Sam Harris' wife, Annaka, said: "Nothing Hitchens does is ever boring." Hitchens has inspired thousands of free-thinkers to remain clever and engaged in our attempts to understand the world around us."			
Tetragramma donaldtrumpi † Thompson, 2016	Sea urchin	Donald Trump	A fossil species from the Cretaceous of Texas, USA. "The name will become a permanent part of the scientific record," said Thompson. "Obviously, I'm probably voting for him. I want change [...] I'd love for him to change the world, or at least the politics of the United States."			
Teutamus rama Dankittipakul, Tavano & Singtripop, 2012	Spider	Bhumibol Adulyadej	A liocranid sac spider native to Thailand and Malaysia, named "in honour of His Majesty King Bhumibol Adulyadej the Great of Thailand, King Rama IX on the auspicious celebration of His Majesty’s 84th Birthday in December, 2011."			
Thegornis sosae † Agnolín, 2023	Bird	Mercedes Sosa	A fossil falcon from the Miocene of Northwestern Argentina, "The species is named in honor of the singer and performer Haydeé Mercedes Sosa (1935-2009) who represented the northwestern Argentinean roots in the folk music."			
Themus bennyianderseni † Fanti & Damgaard, 2018	Beetle	Benny Andersen	A fossil soldier beetle found in Eocene Baltic amber, "named in honour of the Danish songwriter, poet, author, composer and pianist Benny Andersen, in recognition of his long, successful career."			
Theognete weiri Anderson, 2010	Weevil	Peter Weir	A species of lesser weevil from Mexico. The dedication was arranged through a donation to Nature Discovery Fund of the Canadian Museum of Nature by members of the Patrick O'Brian fansite The Gunroom of HMSSurprise.org, in appreciation for Weir's film Master and Commander: The Far Side of the World.			
Tianchisaurus nedegoapeferima † Dong, 1993	Dinosaur	Sam Neill, Laura Dern, Jeff Goldblum, Richard Attenborough, Bob Peck, Martin Ferrero, Ariana Richards, and Joseph Mazzello	Actors involved in the 1993 film Jurassic Park: Neill, Dern, Goldblum, Attenborough, Peck, Ferrero, Richards, and Mazzello. The type specimen was informally referred to as "Jurassosaurus". The species name was proposed by director Steven Spielberg.			
Timbarragraecia samneilli Rentz, Su & Ueshima 2021	Katydid	Sam Neill	An Australian species "Named in honour of the actor, Sam Neill in recognition for his interest in the indigenous peoples of the region occupied by this species."			
Tmesiphantes bethaniae Yamamoto et al., 2007	Spider	Maria Bethânia	A tarantula native to the Brazilian state of Bahia, where Maria Bethânia was born.			
Tmesiphantes raulseixasi Fabiano-da-Silva, Guadanucci & DaSilva, 2019	Spider	Raul Seixas	A tarantula native to the Brazilian state of Bahia, where Raul Seixas was born.			
Tolegnaro sagani Álvarez-Padilla, Ubick & Griswold, 2012	Spider	Carl Sagan				
Tomognathus gigeri † Cavin & Giner, 2012	Fish	H. R. Giger	A fossil bowfin from the Cretaceous of France, named "In honour of Hans Ruedi Giger, the designer of the monster of the movie Alien (1979), a beast that possesses an inner mouth reminiscent of the dermopalatine/coronoid jaw of the fossil studied."			
Trichomycterus garciamarquezi Ardila Rodríguez, 2016	Fish	Gabriel García Márquez	The specimens were collected in Tucurinca, very close to García Márquez's birthplace, Aracataca.			
Trichopelma cheguevarai Ríos-Tamayo, 2024	Spider	Che Guevara	A tarantula from Cuba, named "in honour of Ernesto "Che" Guevara, an Argentinian revolutionary (later a nationalized Cuban), who fought for the liberation of Cuba and Latin America."			
Trichopelma fidelcastroi Ríos-Tamayo, 2024	Spider	Fidel Castro	A tarantula known only from Holguín Province, Cuba, named "in honour of Fidel Alejandro Castro Ruz, the historical leader of the Cuban revolution who was born in Holguín province."			
Tridens chicomendesi Henschel & Costa, 2023	Catfish	Chico Mendes	"Named after Chico Mendes, a worldwide known rubber worker, unionist, city councillor and political activist who was born and lived in Xapuri, Acre State, Brazil, where T. chicomendesi was collected. He fought for the rights of rubber workers and protection of the Amazon, under the idea that their subsistence strongly relied on a well-preserved forest. His pro-Amazon activism culminated in his assassination in 1988, at age 44."			
Triplocania garciamarquezi González-Obando, Carrejo-Gironza & García Aldrete, 2017	Barklouse	Gabriel García Márquez	"The specific name honors the Nobel Prize Gabriel García Márquez, as Colombian and Neotropical as the Triplocania species here studied."			
Triplocania hawkingi González-Obando, Carrejo-Gironza & García Aldrete, 2021	Barklouse	Stephen Hawking	"This species is dedicated to Stephen William Hawking, theoretical physicist, cosmologist, and author. In works of popular science he wrote several books, among them A Brief History of Time: From the Big Bang to Black Holes"			
Trithemis morrisoni Damm & Hadrys, 2009	Dragonfly	Jim Morrison	"Named after the poet James Douglas Morrison and his passion for deserts and the hidden mysteries of nature."			
Tschaidicancha scorsesei Benedetti & Pinto-da-Rocha, 2022	Harvestman	Martin Scorsese				
Tutusius † Gess & Ahlberg, 2018	Stem tetrapod	Desmond Tutu	A genus of fossil tetrapods from the Devonian of South Africa. The senior author stated "When I was thinking about names for them, it occurred to me that these tetrapods led the way from these rather anoxic swamps out into the sunshine. And it seems to me that in many ways, that was a metaphor for what Desmond Tutu had done."			
Udea nicholsae Mally, 2022	Moth	Nichelle Nichols	A grass moth from Tanzania, "named in honour of the late American actress Nichelle Nichols [...], best known for her portrayal of communications officer Nyota Uhura on board the starship USS Enterprise in the science-fiction television series Star Trek as well as in six following feature films." The paper was published just four months after Nichols's demise.			
Uroballus carlei Logunov & Obenauer, 2019	Spider	Eric Carle	A jumping spider that mimics the appearance of a lichen moth caterpillar, "dedicated to Eric Carle (b. 1929), the American illustrator and author of more than 70 books for children and adults. His most renowned books include The Very Hungry Caterpillar, which chronicles the growth and metamorphosis of a caterpillar, and The Very Busy Spider. Indeed, these and other books by Eric Carle provide the first conscious contact of young readers with the natural world, being innovative tools for early-age environmental and biodiversity education." The species description was published on the occasion of Carle's 90th birthday and the 50th anniversary of the first publication of The Very Hungry Caterpillar.			
Valgothrombium takhtii Saberi-Riseh & Saboori, 2020	Mite	Gholamreza Takhti	This species is native to Iran.			
Vallaris zappai † Wessels et al., 2001	Rodent	Frank Zappa	A fossil species of gerbil from the Miocene of Anatolia. Zappa's music was the favourite of one of the authors to listen to while carrying out their research.			
Velundella Pánek, Táborský & Čepička, 2015	Protist	The Velvet Underground	A genus of Jakobids "named after the Velvet Underground, an American rock band that represent underground music and is often considered as one of the most important and influential groups of the 1960s."			
Venezillo jilguero López-Orozco, Carpio-Díaz & Campos-Filho, 2026	Crustacean	Jorge Oñate	A woodlouse from Colombia "named after the Vallenata musician Jorge Antonio González Oñate, also known as "El Jilguero de América"." ("America's goldfinch")			
Venezillo moreirai Campos-Filho, Carpio-Díaz & Bichuette, 2023	Crustacean	Moraes Moreira	A Brazilian woodlouse "named in memoriam of the Brazilian musician Antônio Carlos Moraes Pires, also known as Moraes Moreira. The musician was born in the municipality of Ituaçu [the type locality], and he was famous for his engagement with the Brazilian cultural movement "Novos Baianos", with compositions allusive to the culture of the country".			
Venezillo pambele López-Orozco, Borja-Arrieta & Campos-Filho, 2026	Crustacean	Antonio Cervantes	A woodlouse from Colombia "named after Antonio Cervantes Reyes, also known as "Kid Pambelé", the first Colombian boxing world champion."			
Vigdisia praesidens Agnarsson, Kuntner, Yu & Gregorič, 2024	Spider	Vigdís Finnbogadóttir	"The genus name, feminine in gender, honors Vigdís Finnbogadóttir, former president of Iceland (1980–1996) and the first democratically elected female president in the world. Vigdís shares the spider's elegance and wits."; "The species ephithet praesidens is a noun in apposition, honoring the presidential legacy of Vigdís Finnbogadóttir." The lead author for this Malagasy species is from Iceland.			
Vologesia rollingstones † Schlüter & Wiese, 2017	Sea urchin	The Rolling Stones	A fossil species from the Cretaceous of Northern Spain, "Named after British Rock'n'Roll band The Rolling Stones for the song "Gimme Shelter" (1969) and all the rest."			
Volvarina milanesi Espinosa, Ortea & Pina-Amargós, 2022	Sea snail	Pablo Milanés	A margin shell from Cuba, "Dedicated to the Cuban singer-songwriter Pablo Milanés (Bayamo, 1943 – Madrid, 2022), one of the founders of the Nueva Trova Cubana [...] With Pablo we shared a way of thinking about our daily work. If I don't live the song I don't sing it, Pablo used to say. If we don't collect the new species we don't describe them, we use to say."			
Volvarina sofiae Ortea & Espinosa, 1998	Sea snail	Queen Sofía of Spain	This species was described from specimens collected in Jardines del Rey ("Gardens of the King") islands in Cuba, and named after Queen Sofía to celebrate the visit of the King and Queen of Spain to Cuba arranged for the following year after publication (1999) (the first ever by Spanish monarchs). The sea slug species Chelidonura juancarlosi, found in Jardines de la Reina ("Gardens of the Queen"), was named concurrently after her husband King Juan Carlos I.			
Vunicothoe Boyko, 2009	Crustacean	The Velvet Underground and Nico	"Vunicothoe is a combination of the root "nicothöe" from the copepod genus name derived from the name of one of the harpies of Greek mythology, with the prefix "vu" as a contraction of the words "Velvet Underground." This generic epithet pays homage to the seminal musical recording The Velvet Underground & Nico, as performed by Lou Reed, John Cale, Sterling Morrison, Maureen Tucker, and Nico (a pseudonym for Christa Paffgen), released in 1967 with the infamous peel-a-banana cover art by producer Andy Warhol."			
Whartonia carpenteri Brennan, 1962	Mite	Scott Carpenter	One of four species of chiggers named concurrently after the cosmonauts and astronauts who participated in the first four crewed orbital spaceflights in 1961 and 1962 (see also Euschoengastia, and Whartonia glenni in the List of organisms named after famous people (born 1900–1924)). "Named for Lt. Cmdr. Malcolm Scott Carpenter., USA, who completed three orbits of the earth in the Aurora VII, 24 May 1962."			
Wolongia papafrancisi Malamel, Nafin, Sankaran & Sebastian, 2018	Spider	Pope Francis	"This species is dedicated to Pope Francis, the present reigning Pope of the Catholic Church in honour of his great contributions as an environmental conservationist."			
Wormaldia boteroi Muñoz-Quesada & Holzenthal, 2015	Caddisfly	Fernando Botero	A Colombian species "named in honor of the Colombian painter and sculptor Dr. Fernando Botero (born in Medellín, 1932), in recognition of his outstanding artwork. The widened inferior appendages of the male genitalia of this new species, remind us of the fat or inflated forms of the characters of Dr. Botero."			
Wrightia sirikitiae D.J.Middleton & Santisuk	Flowering plant	Sirikit	A plant from the dogbane family native to Thailand, named "in honour of Her Majesty Queen Sirikit of Thailand who has long been interested in the diversity and complexity of natural ecological systems. She has initiated a number of projects related to the conservation of biological diversity."			
Xanthosomnium Wahl & Sime, 2002	Wasp	Tangerine Dream	"The genus is named after the musical group Tangerine Dream, the choice of discriminating ichneumonologists. From the Greek xanthos, yellow or yellowish-red (the closest equivalent to 'tangerine' in a classical language) and the Latin somnium, dream."			
Xanthosomnium froesei Wahl & Sime, 2002	Wasp	Edgar Froese	"Named after Edgar Froese, the founder and continuity behind Tangerine Dream."			
Xyalophora tedjoansi van Noort, Buffington & Forshage, 2014	Wasp	Ted Joans	"The specific epithet [...] is to commemorate the American-cosmopolitan poet Ted Joans (1928–2003), a surrealist, beat, black power and jazz activist who made Mali [where this species is found] one of his several homes in the world. The Xyalophora spine may suggest the horn of Joans' totemic rhino."			
Xylotrechus haveli Viktora, 2021	Beetle	Václav Havel	A longhorn beetle species from Vietnam described by a Czech scientist, "dedicated to Václav Havel (1936–2011), writer, playwright, Defender of Human and Civil Rights, the last President of Czechoslovakia and the first President of the Czech Republic."			
Xylotrechus kryli Viktora, 2021	Beetle	Karel Kryl	A longhorn beetle species from The Philippines described by a Czech scientist, "dedicated to Karel Kryl (1944–1994), Czech singer and poet, one of the most important representatives of the Czech protest song in 1968–1989."			
Yanomamius raonii Bertani & Almeida, 2021	Spider	Raoni Metuktire	A species native to the Amazon basin, named after the indigenous leader Raoni Metuktire, a Brazilian environmentalist and indigenist, for his decades-long struggle to defend the Amazon rainforest and its sites. The genus name honours the Yanomami people.			
Ypsolopha chicoi Vargas, 2021	Moth	Chico Buarque	"Ypsolopha chicoi sp. n. is named in honour of the eminent Brazilian musician and composer Chico Buarque (Francisco Buarque de Hollanda), for all his wonderful contribution to the "Música Popular Brasileira"."			
Zappa Murdy, 1989	Fish	Frank Zappa	"The generic name is in honour of Frank Zappa for his articulate and sagacious defense of the First Amendment of the U.S. Constitution." (referring to his intervention at the PMRC Senate Hearings)			
Zappaichthys † Carnevale & Collette, 2014	Fish	Frank Zappa	A fossil genus of toadfish from the Miocene of Austria.			
Zasphinctus lumumbai Hita Garcia & Gómez, 2025	Ant	Patrice Lumumba	This species was described from a single specimen collected in the Democratic Republic of the Congo.			
Zasphinctus sarowiwai Hita Garcia et al., 2017	Ant	Ken Saro-Wiwa	"in honour of the famous Nigerian writer, environmentalist, and human rights activist Kenule Beeson "Ken" Saro-Wiwa. By naming a species from threatened rainforest habitats after him, we want to acknowledge his environmental legacy and draw attention to the often-problematic conservation situation in most Afrotropical rainforests."			
Zeballolagus ronniejamesdioi † Martin, Novo, González Ruiz & Tejedor, 2024	Marsupial mammal	Ronnie James Dio	A fossil polydolopimorph from the Miocene of Argentina, named "in honor of Ronnie James Dio, for his outstanding contributions to hard rock and heavy metal music with the bands Rainbow, Black Sabbath, and Dio."			
Zimmerius chicomendesi Whitney, Schunck, Rêgo & Silveira2, 2013	Bird	Chico Mendes	"Francisco "Chico" Alves Mendes Filho (1944–1988) was a man wise beyond the borders of his time and space. He learned to use the Amazon rainforest by living in it and understood the fundamental importance of preservation of natural resources as well as the dire socio-economic consequences of their destruction – and [...] [he] was able to make that knowledge count in the international arena. We have no doubt that Mendes and his message, during the last few years of his short life, did more to educate such agencies as the Inter-American Development Bank to more wisely distribute funding toward sustainable uses in Amazonia than has any other individual. If Mendes were alive today, we cannot help but imagine that Brazil would be far ahead of where it is in the development of a truly sustainable Amazonia in reasonable harmony with indigenous peoples and colonists. In bringing this obscure little bird to the light of science, we call up the spirit of Chico Mendes to help us all get it right."			

== See also ==
- List of bacterial genera named after personal names
- List of rose cultivars named after people
- List of taxa named by anagrams
- List of organisms named after works of fiction
