= List of organisms named after famous people (born 1900–1924) =

This description is intentionally empty

In biological nomenclature, organisms often receive scientific names that honor a person. A taxon (e.g., species or genus; plural: taxa) named in honor of another entity is an eponymous taxon, and names specifically honoring a person or persons are known as patronyms. Scientific names are generally formally published in peer-reviewed journal articles or larger monographs along with descriptions of the named taxa and ways to distinguish them from other taxa. Following rules of Latin grammar, species or subspecies names derived from a man's name often end in -i or -ii if named for an individual, and -orum if named for a group of men or mixed-sex group, such as a family. Similarly, those named for a woman often end in -ae, or -arum for two or more women.

This list is part of the List of organisms named after famous people, and includes organisms named after famous individuals born between 1 January 1900 and 31 December 1924. It also includes ensembles (including bands) in which at least one member was born within those dates; but excludes companies, institutions, ethnic groups or nationalities, and populated places. It does not include organisms named for fictional entities, for biologists, paleontologists or other natural scientists, (Note: Entomologist Guillermo Kuschel, for instance, has over 200 eponymous organisms.) nor for associates or family members of researchers who are not otherwise notable; exceptions are made, however, for natural scientists who are much more famous for other aspects of their lives, such as, for example, Japanese emperor Hirohito.

Organisms named after famous people born earlier than 1900 can be found in:

- List of organisms named after famous people (born before 1800)
- List of organisms named after famous people (born 1800–1899)

Organisms named after famous people born later than 1924 can be found in:

- List of organisms named after famous people (born 1925–1949)
- List of organisms named after famous people (born 1950–1974)
- List of organisms named after famous people (born 1975–present)

The scientific names are given as originally described (their basionyms): subsequent research may have placed species in different genera, or rendered them taxonomic synonyms of previously described taxa. Some of these names may be unavailable in the zoological sense or illegitimate in the botanical sense due to senior homonyms already having the same name.

== List (people born 1900–1924) ==
Yellow background shading indicates that this taxon name has been subsequently modified (e.g. species transferred to a different genus), but the eponymy is still valid
Pink background shading indicates that this taxon name is invalid because of homonymy, or has been synonymised and is no longer in use, or is considered a nomen dubium

Taxon	Type	Namesake	Notes	Taxon image	Namesake image	Ref
Abichites shahriari † Korn et al., 2015	Ammonite	Mohammad-Hossein Shahriar	A fossil from the Permian of the Aras river valley, on the border between Iran and Azerbaijan, named "After Mohammad-Hossein Shahriar (1906–1988), the last poet of the lineage of classical legendary Iranian Azerbaijani poets."			
Abrolophus ederleae Hakimitabar, 2025	Mite	Gertrude Ederle				
Acanthella stanleei Nascimento, Cavalcanti & Pinheiro, 2019	Sponge	Stan Lee	"in honor of the scriptwriter and editor of Marvel Comics, recently deceased."			
Acanthobunocephalus scruggsi Carvalho & Reis, 2020	Catfish	Earl Scruggs	"Named after Earl Scruggs, a prominent American banjo player known for popularizing a three-finger banjo picking style, also known as "Scruggs style", which is characteristic of bluegrass music. The name of the species also makes an allusion to the common name given to aspredinid species in general (banjo catfishes), and the remarkable resemblance of the new species with this musical instrument."			
Acmaeodera rockefelleri Cazier, 1951	Beetle	David Rockefeller	This jewel beetle species was described from specimens collected by the David Rockefeller Mexican Expedition of the American Museum of Natural History. Subsequently transferred to genus Acmaeoderopsis.			
Acritus mandelai Gomy, 2001	Beetle	Nelson Mandela	A clown beetle native to South Africa.			
Adoretus thomasi Limbourg, Dekoninck & Seidel, 2024	Beetle	Terry-Thomas	"Dedicated to the late British actor Terry-Thomas (1911–1990) for the similarity between the shape of the big moustache of his character of Sir Reginald in the 1966 French-British comedy film La Grande Vadrouille and the long setae on the apex of the parameres of the new species."			
Aegomorphus wojtylai Hilszczanski & Bystrowski, 2005	Beetle	Pope John Paul II	A Polish beetle, posthumously named for the Pope's birth name, Karol Wojtyła. Subsequently synonymised with Aegomorphus obscurior.			
Aetana manansalai Huber, 2015	Spider	Vicente Manansala	A cellar spider from the Philippines, "Named for the Filipino painter and illustrator Vicente Silva Manansala (1910–1981), most famous for his 'Madonna of the Slums'"			
Aetana ocampoi Huber, 2015	Spider	Hernando R. Ocampo	A cellar spider from the Philippines, "Named for the Filipino artist Hernando Ruiz Ocampo (1911–1978), famous for his work reflecting the harsh realities of his country after the Second World War, but also for his interest in depicting Philippine flora and fauna."			
Afgekia mahidoliae B.L.Burtt & Chermsir.	Legume	Srinagarindra	A climbing vine from Thailand "dedicated, with permission, to Her Royal Highness, the King's Mother, whose interest in the Thai flora is well known."			
Agraecia cesairei Hugel, 2009	Katydid	Aimé Césaire	This species is endemic to Martinique. It was subsequently transferred to the monotypic genus Sylvainhugiella, named after the scientist who described it.			
Agrilus rockefelleri Cazier, 1951	Beetle	David Rockefeller	This jewel beetle species was described from specimens collected by the David Rockefeller Mexican Expedition of the American Museum of Natural History.			
Agroecotettix kahloae Hill, 2024	Grasshopper	Frida Kahlo	"honoring Frida Kahlo (1907–1954), the iconic Mexican painter known for her vivid deeply personal and symbolic artwork. Her enduring connection to Mexican culture makes her an apt figure to be commemorated through this species, which is endemic to Mexico. In naming a species in her honor I celebrate her artistic legacy and underscore the importance of preserving the biodiversity of her homeland."			
Agroecotettix moorei Hill, 2024	Grasshopper	Clayton Moore	"honoring Clayton Moore, the American actor who most famously starred as a fictional Texas Ranger in The Lone Ranger television series from 1949–1957. Moore's portrayal of the character embodied qualities of justice, bravery, and a deep connection to the American West. This naming honors Moore’s cultural impact and the desert landscapes that inspired Moore's legendary character." This species is endemic to a small area around Sanderson, Texas in the Chihuahuan Desert.			
Agroecotettix silverheelsi Hill, 2024	Grasshopper	Jay Silverheels	"honoring Jay Silverheels, a Native American athlete and actor who most famously portrayed the fictional character Tonto in The Lone Ranger television series from 1949–1957. Silverheels was one of the first Native American actors to portray a major Indigenous character on a television series. Throughout his career, Silverheels advocated for more inclusion of Indigenous people in media and founded the Indian Actors Workshop in Los Angeles during the 1960's. This naming honors Silverheels' cultural impact and the Texas landscapes where the series was set." This species is endemic to the Tamaulipan mezquital in South Texas.			
Aleiodes kingmani Shimbori & Shaw, 2014	Wasp	Eduardo Kingman	A parasitoid wasp from Ecuador, "named after Eduardo Kingman (Loja, February 23, 1913 – Quito, November 27, 1997), one of the greatest Ecuadorian artists, who dedicated his art to portray the indigenous people of Ecuador."			
Allende Álvarez-Padilla, 2007	Spider	Salvador Allende	A genus of Long-jawed orb weaver spiders native to Chile.			
Allendia Noonan, 1974	Beetle	Salvador Allende	"The genus is named for Salvador Allende, the late president of Chile, and is dedicated to his memory." This genus is native to Chile, and was named one year after Allende's death.			
Alterosa amadoi Dumas, Calor & Nessimian, 2013	Caddisfly	Jorge Amado	A species native to Bahia state, Brazil, "dedicated to the deceased Brazilian writer Jorge Amado, who was born in Bahia state in 1912 and died in 2001. Amado is one of the most acclaimed contemporary Brazilian novelists, whose 32 novels have sold millions of copies. Among his best-known works are Capitães de Areia, Gabriela, Cravo e Canela, and Tieta do Agreste. In 2012, Brazil celebrated the centenary of his birth."			
Alterosa caymmii Dumas, Calor & Nessimian, 2013	Caddisfly	Dorival Caymmi	A species native to Bahia state, Brazil, "named in memory of Dorival Caymmi, considered one of the most important Brazilian songwriters. Caymmi was born in Bahia state in 1914 and died [in] 2008. He became a national icon with his lyrics that evoked the charm of Bahia's fishing villages, beaches and beautiful women, like "O Que é Que a Baiana Tem?", "Marina", "Rainha do Mar", "Samba da Minha Terra", among others".			
Alucita zinovievi Kovtunovich & Ustjuzhanin, 2016	Moth	Alexander Zinoviev	An african many-plumed moth described by Russian scientists and "named after the prominent philosopher, writer and sociologist of our time, Alexandr Zinoviev, on the eve of its [sic] 95th anniversary."			
Ambocythere amadoi † Bergue & Coimbra, 20218	Crustacean	Jorge Amado	A fossil ostracod from the Pleistocene of Brazil, "In honor of the Brazilian writer Jorge Amado (1912–2001), born in Bahia State, on whose coast lies the Camamu Basin." (the type locality).			
Amplaria adamsi Shear & Krejca, 2007	Millipede	Ansel Adams	A troglobiont species found in Sequoia National Park, California, named "After the late Ansel Adams, an extraordinary photographer whose finest pictures depict the Sierra Nevada."			
Anelosimus nelsoni Agnarsson, 2006	Spider	Nelson Mandela	This species is native to South Africa.			
Anillinus docwatsoni Sokolov & Carlton, 2004	Beetle	Doc Watson	A species known from a single locality in Rutherford County, North Carolina, named "after Arthel "Doc" Watson, legendary bluegrass musician from North Carolina."			
Anopheles (Cellia) seretsei Abdulla-Khan, Coetzee & Hunt, 1998	Mosquito	Seretse Khama	A nail mosquito from Botswana.			
Anthonomus rulfoi Clark, 1987	Weevil	Juan Rulfo	This species is native to Mexico.			
Aphodius rodrigoi Angus, Maté, Angus & Král, 2024	Beetle	Joaquín Rodrigo	"The name is derived from the surname of the name Joaquín Rodrigo Vidre, a Spanish composer whose most famous work, Concierto de Aranjuez, refers to the geographical area from which the species hails."			
Apsilocera bradburyi Tselikh, Lee & Ku, 2024	Wasp	Ray Bradbury				
Arianops carteri Carlton, 2008	Beetle	Jimmy Carter				
Armenohyrax aznavouriani † Becker, Lefebvre, Saulnier Masson & Vasilyan, 2026	Hyracoid	Charles Aznavour	A fossil species from the Pliocene or Armenia, named "In memory of Charles Aznavour (1924-2018), full name Charles Aznavourian, a famous French-Armenian singer and songwriter."			
Aspergillus heldtiae Visagie	Fungus	Margaret Vinci Heldt	"named after Margaret Vinci Heldt, the creator of the beehive hairstyle that was popular during the 1960s and famously Marge Simpson's choice of hairstyle. This species resembles the beehive when observed through a dissection microscope."			
Astyanax kennedyi Géry, 1964	Fish	John F. Kennedy	This species was described shortly after Kennedy's assassination, and named in his memory.			
Aulospongus mandela Cavalcanti, Santos & Pinheiro, 2014	Sponge	Nelson Mandela				
Australopicus nelsonmandelai † Manegold & Louchart, 2012	Bird	Nelson Mandela	A fossil woodpecker from the Pliocene of South Africa, "dedicated to Nelson Rolihlahla Mandela on the occasion of his 94th birthday on 18 July 2012."			
Austrogena nerudai Krylova, Sellanes, Valdés & D'Elía, 2014	Bivalve	Pablo Neruda	"The species is dedicated to Pablo Neruda (1904–1973), the renowned Chilean poet, awarded with the Nobel Prize of literature in 1971, who was also a keen collector of shells. The poet's grave and one of his houses, 'Isla Negra', now a museum, are located at the seashore of El Quisco nearby the collection site of the new species."			
Austrotinodes lattesi Dumas, de Souza & Rocha, 2017	Caddisfly	César Lattes	A species from Brazil, "Dedicated to the Brazilian physicist Cesare Mansueto Giulio Lattes, who was born in Curitiba, Paraná state in 1924 and died in 2005. César Lattes was one of the most distinguished and honored Brazilian physicists, and his work was fundamental for the development of atomic physics. He was one of the discoverers of the Pion (pi meson), a subatomic particle, and one of the main personalities behind the creation of Conselho Nacional de Desenvolvimento Científico e Tecnológico (CNPq) and Centro Brasileiro de Pesquisas Físicas (CBPF)."			
Ayacucho pasolinii Benedetti & Pinto-da-Rocha, 2022	Harvestman	Pier Paolo Pasolini				
Azygophleps adamsonae Yakovlev & László, 2020	Moth	Joy Adamson	A carpenter moth from Cameroon.			
Bacillus glennii Seuylemezian et al., 2020	Bacterium	John Glenn	This bacterium was isolated from the vehicle assembly building at Kennedy Space Center where the Viking spacecraft were assembled, and "named after John Glenn, a NASA astronaut who was the first American to orbit the Earth."; Subsequently transferred to genus Peribacillus.			
Bairstowius amaliae † Rita, Weis, Duarte & De Baets, 2021	Belemnite	Amália Rodrigues	A fossil from the Jurassic of Portugal, named after Amália Rodrigues, "a famous Portuguese Fado singer considered to be one of the most significant ambassadors of the Portuguese culture and language around the world."			
Bastanius Mirshamsi, Zamani & Marusik, 2016	Spider	Mohammad Ebrahim Bastani Parizi	"honouring the late emeritus professor of the University of Tehran Dr Mohammad Ebrahim Bastani Parizi (1924–2014), who was an Iranian historian, translator, poet, essayist and author of non-fiction books. His numerous publications are mostly popular reads on the history of Iran and the history of his hometown, Kerman." The type locality of the type species of this genus is in Kerman province.			
Belesica madiba Rousse & Van Noort, 2014	Wasp	Nelson Mandela	A species of parasitoid wasp endemic to South Africa. "We respectfully dedicate this rare gem to "Madiba" Nelson Mandela, for the enlightenment he brought to South Africa and the remainder of the World. Enkosi uhambe kakuhle Tata Madiba [Thank you and go well Tata Madiba]."			
Belisana keyti Huber, 2005	Spider	George Keyt	A cellar spider from Sri Lanka, "Named for George Keyt (1901–1993), one of the most outstanding Sri Lankan painters. The eternal theme of devine [sic] and human love is the thread that runs unbroken throughout his prolific artistic career."			
Bohadschia cousteaui Cherbonnier, 1954	Sea cucumber	Jacques Cousteau	Described from specimens collected by Cousteau's ship, the RV Calypso.			
Cacomorphocerus bentifabrici † Fanti & Damgaard, 2018	Beetle	Bent Fabric	A fossil soldier beetle found in Eocene Baltic amber, "named in honour of the Danish musician Bent Fabricius-Bjerre, internationally known as Bent Fabric, in recognition of his career as a pianist and composer."			
Calacalles manriquei Stüben, 2018	Weevil	César Manrique	"dedicated to César Manrique (1919–1992), the famous artist, sculptor, architect, but above all nature conservationist on the Canary Island of Lanzarote. He has characterised the present appearance of this volcanic island with its unique fauna and flora." This species is endemic to Lanzarote.			
Calathotarsus fangioi Ferretti, Soresi, González & Arnedo, 2019	Spider	Juan Manuel Fangio	This species is restricted to a small area of Buenos Aires Province in Argentina, and some of the specimens used to describe it were collected in Fangio's hometown, the city of Balcarce.			
Callicebus bernhardi van Roosmalen et al., 2002	Monkey	Prince Bernhard of Lippe-Biesterfeld				
Campylaspis cousteaui Petrescu, 1990	Crustacean	Jacques Cousteau	"The species is dedicated to the famous explorer and oceanographer, the Commander Academician Jacques Yves Cousteau as a hommage paid to his 80-th anniversary."			
Candelabrella shahriari Mekht.	Fungus	Mohammad-Hossein Shahriar	This species was identified from samples of soil collected from Shahriar's grave in Tabriz, Iran. Subsequently transferred to genus Arthrobotrys			
Capederces madibai Maquart & Van Noort, 2017	Beetle	Nelson Mandela	A longhorn beetle from South Africa "dedicated to Nelson Mandela, also known by his clan name Madiba, a South African hero and Nobel Peace Prize holder, who passed away on 5 December 2013 at the age of 95."			
Carapoia carybei Huber, 2016	Spider	Carybé	A cellar spider from Brazil.			
Carebara madibai Fischer & Azorsa, 2014	Ant	Nelson Mandela	"Named in memory Nelson Rolihlahla Mandela (18 July 1918–5 December 2013), who was nicknamed Madiba by his people, former South African president and anti-apartheid revolutionary, often also described as "father of the nation"."			
Ceraphron kimathii Salden & Peters, 2023	Wasp	Dedan Kimathi	This species is native to Kenya and "is named in honour of Dedan Kimathi (1920–1957), the leader of the Kenyan independence movement KLFA. He fought against British colonialists and was executed in 1957."			
Charletonia shahriari Saboori, Azimi & Shirdel, 2012	Mite	Mohammad-Hossein Shahriar	This species was described from specimens collected in Tabriz, Iran, and "named in memory of Mohammad Hossein Shahriar, one of the most famous poets of Iran from Tabriz (1906–1988)."			
Charletonia terianae Hakimitabar, Saboori & Seiedy, 2013	Mite	Alenush Terian	This species was described from specimens collected from the grounds of the University of Tehran in Iran, and "named in memory of Prof. Alenoush Terian (1920–2011), the mother of Iranian astronomy and first Iranian lady astronomer and physics professor. She was one of the founders of the solar observatory of the Institute of Geophysics at University of Tehran, where she also worked until her retirement in 1979."			
Cicindela rockefelleri Cazier, 1954	Beetle	David Rockefeller	"This species is named in honor of Dr. David Rockefeller whose continued interest and support have enabled us to make large Mexican collections." Subsequently transferred to genus Habroscelimorpha.			
Cis mandelai Souza-Gonçalves & Lopes-Andrade, 2017	Beetle	Nelson Mandela	A minute tree-fungus beetle from South Africa, "named in honor of Nelson Rolihlahla Mandela (1918–2013), the most powerful symbol of the fight against the segregationist regime of Apartheid."			
Clitenella sukarnoi Mohamedsaid, 2001	Beetle	Sukarno	This leaf beetle is native to the island of Bali, Indonesia.			
Clusia donramonii J. E. Nascim & Bittrich	Flowering plant	Ramón Valdés				
Cobitis afifeae Freyhof, Bayçelebi & Geiger, 2018	Fish	Afife Jale	A species of loach from Turkey.			
Coccophagus herndoni Girault, 1935	Wasp	Angelo Herndon	Subsequently synonymised with Encarsia brimblecombei.			
Colbertia falui † Fernández et al., 2021	Notoungulate (an extinct order of mammals)	Eduardo Falú	A fossil oldfieldthomasiid from the Eocene of Salta Province, Argentina, named "In honor of Eduardo Falú (1923–2013), an Argentinian folk music composer and guitarist, strongly influenced by the folk traditions of Salta Province."			
Coniceromyia niemeyeri Ament, Kung & Brown, 2020	Fly	Oscar Niemeyer	"Considering the characteristically curved wing veins of this species, we name it in honor of the Brazilian architect Oscar Niemeyer whose revolutionary work frequently has characteristic curved shapes."			
Conus lombardii † Hendricks, 2015	Sea snail	Vince Lombardi	A fossil species from the Miocene of the Dominican Republic, "Named in honor of Vincent Lombardi (1913–1970), former coach of the Green Bay Packers who led the team to victory in Super Bowl I and II."			
Cowanomyia hillaryi Jaschhof & Jaschhof, 2009	Fly	Edmund Hillary	A species of fungus gnat endemic to New Zealand. "We name this new species in memory of Sir Edmund Hillary, the Patron of the New Zealand Native Forests Restoration Trust until his death in January 2008, and to honour the Trust's dedicated work from which forest-dwelling arthropods, such as fungus gnats, should benefit greatly."			
Cretalamna bryanti † Ebersole & Ehret, 2018	Shark	Bear Bryant and his family	A fossil species of mega-toothed shark from the Cretaceous of Alabama, USA, named "in honor of the Bryant family, whose commitment to education and ongoing support of the University of Alabama, the ALMNH [Alabama Museum of Natural History], and MSC [McWane Science Center, where the holotype is stored] have enhanced the reputations and missions of all three institutions."			
Culicoides rulfoi Spinelli & Huerta, 2015	Fly	Juan Rulfo	The holotype of this mesoamerican biting midge was collected in Mexico. "We are pleased to name this species after the Mexican writer Juan Rulfo, in recognition of his very important literary work."			
Cunaxoides shahriari Bagheri, Paktinat-Saeij & Castro, 2016	Mite	Mohammad-Hossein Shahriar	A species native to Northern Iran and Iranian Azerbaijan, "named in memory of "Mohammad Hossein Behjat Tabrizi, Shahriar" (1906–1988) who was a notable Iranian poet of Iranian Azerbaijani origin, who wrote in Azeri, Turkish and Persian."			
Cybaeina dixoni Bennett, 2023	Spider	Willie Dixon				
Cybaeus waynei Bennett, 2009	Spider	Johnny Wayne	A spider from the West Coast of the United States described by Canadian scientists. "The specific epithet is a patronym honouring the late Johnny Wayne. He provided an excellent solution to the minor problem of a name for this species when he died the day the original draft of this description was prepared (18 July 1990). A Canadian comedian, Johnny Wayne was a master of the double entendre. His often twisted sense of humour appealed to several generations of Canadians of all ages."			
Cyphochilus latus aisiqi Sabatinelli, 2020	Beetle	Ai Siqi	"The noun in apposition refers to Ai Siqi the pen name of Li Shengxuan (1910–1966), a Yunnan Mongol Chinese philosopher author of important works on Materialism and Philosophy for the Masses, born in Tengchong in Yunnan, where the Holotype specimen of the new subspecies was collected."			
Cyphochilus leducthoi Sabatinelli, 2020	Beetle	Lê Đức Thọ	"Lê Đức Thọ was a Vietnamese general, diplomat, politician, and awardee (but refused to accept) of the 1973 Nobel Peace Prize, for his efforts in negotiating between the U.S.A. and Vietnam, the country from where the new species of Cyphochilus is described."			
Cyrea szymborska Holzmann & Pawlowski, 2018	Protist	Wisława Szymborska	"The species is named in honor of the late poet and Nobel Prize winner, Wislawa Szymborska, who also wrote about natural history, including that of Foraminifera, in her poems." (Note: Genus Cyrea Holzmann & Pawlowski, 2018 is a junior homonym of Cyrea Gordon & Canepari, 2013 (Coleoptera), but it has not yet been replaced.)			
Dactylopodola nadine Todaro, Perissinotto & Bownes, 2015	Hairyback worm	Nadine Gordimer	This species was described from specimens collected in South Africa and "dedicated to the late Nadine Gordimer, South African writer, civil right activist and recipient of the 1991 Nobel Prize in Literature."			
Daisya obriani Anderson, 2003	Weevil	Patrick O'Brian	"This species is named after Patrick O'Brian (1914–2000), an author of a series of historical novels set in the early 19th century British Royal Navy. The dedication was arranged through a donation to Nature Discovery Fund of the Canadian Museum of Nature by The Gunroom of HMSSurprise.org, an internet group devoted to the publications of Mr. O'Brian. Many of his books tell of long sea voyages and there are often references to the weevils found in the ship's biscuit."			
Dalicrinus † Cole et al., 2017	Sea lily	Salvador Dalí	A fossil genus of crinoids from the Ordovician of Spain, named "in recognition of the Spanish surrealist painter, Salvador Dalí, with reference to the irregular plating of the interradial areas."			
Daptolestes leei Robinson, Li & Yeates, 2020	Fly	Stan Lee	"Stan Lee's fly [...] shares his characteristic sunglasses and white moustache". In the same paper, other species were named after Marvel Comics characters, such as "Thor's fly" Daptolestes bronteflavus (meaning "blond thunder"), "Loki's fly" Daptolestes illusiolautus (meaning "elegant deception"), "Black Widow's fly" Daptolestes feminategus (meaning "woman wearing leather"), and "Deadpool's fly" Humorolethalis sergius ("[The generic name] sounds like lethal humour and is derived from the Latin words humorosus, meaning wet or moist, and lethalis meaning dead")			
Delisleia pattersoni Girault, 1936	Wasp	Haywood Patterson	"to Haywood Patterson, a persecuted negro of Alabama."			
Dichogaster manleyi James, 2004	Earthworm	Michael Manley	This species is native to Jamaica.			
Diplomaragna feynmani Shear, 1990	Millipede	Richard Feynman	"The species name honors Richard P. Feynman, physicist, teacher, artist, musician, raconteur, and personal hero of the author, whose untimely death prevented him from realizing his ambition to visit Tannu Tuva, now the Tuva ASSR." (where the holotype was collected)			
Diplotaxis rockefelleri Vaurie & Cazier, 1955	Beetle	David Rockefeller	This scarab beetle species was described from specimens collected by the David Rockefeller Mexican Expedition of the American Museum of Natural History.			
Dolomedes venmani Raven & Hebron, 2018	Spider	Jack Venman	A species of fishing spider from Australia, named "in honour of Jack Venman (13 August 1911–29 December 1994), a farmer who, wanting to preserve the great biodiversity in the area, sold his 255 acres to the Queensland Government [sic; actually the Shire of Albert] in 1971 for $1."			
Doris parrae Ortea, 2017	Sea slug	Violeta Parra	A species native to the Galápagos Islands, "named in honour of Victoria [sic] Parra (4 October 1917, San Carlos – 5 February 1967, Santiago de Chile), Chilean composer and singer, on the 100th anniversary of her birth, author of the song "Gracias a la vida" ["Thanks to life"] that has so often been sung by those who saw their childhood dreams come true."			
Drosophila kingmani Peñafiel-Vinueza & Rafael, 2018	Fly	Eduardo Kingman	A fruit fly from Ecuador; "The species name honors Eduardo Kingman (1913–1997). Kingman was a famous painter and muralist and was born in Loja [very close to the type locality]. Kingman was a founder of the Ecuadorian impressionism movement."			
Drosophila teresae Pradhan & Sati, 2015	Fly	Mother Teresa	A fruit fly from India named "in honour of Saint Mother Teresa (Nobel Peace Prize winner 1979), who was the founder of the order of the Missionaries of Charity, a Roman Catholic congregation of women dedicated to helping the poor."			
Dusona franklinae Kittel, 2016	Wasp	Rosalind Franklin	Replacement name for Dusona nigritibialis (Gupta & Gupta, 1976), which had originally been described as Kartika nigritibialis Gupta & Gupta, 1976, but upon being transferred to the genus Dusona in 1997, became a junior homonym of Dusona nigritibialis (Viereck, 1926).			
Dysanema irvinei Uvarov, 1925	Grasshopper	Andrew Irvine	One of two species of Acridid grasshoppers collected by the 1924 British Mount Everest expedition and named after the two mountaineers who died on this expedition (see also List of organisms named after famous people (born 1800–1899)).			
Elysia chavelavargas Ortea, 2017	Sea slug	Chavela Vargas	A species native to the Pacific coast of Costa Rica, named "In honour of the unique ranchera singer Chavela Vargas, a native of Heredia, Costa Rica, and naturalized Mexican, like our colleague and friend Julio Magaña, organiser of the collection in Guanacaste, as a technician of INBio, an institution also based in Heredia. A name for the memory of a woman who lived to die and who, like Julio, travelled to a particular hell, from which Julio returned to see the end of INBio's Malacology Unit (2003) and the beginning of the Institution's decline."			
Elysia manriquei Ortea & Moro, 2009	Sea slug	César Manrique	A species native to the Canary Islands and named "in honour of César Manrique, illustrious son of Lanzarote, a pioneer in defending what is now known as sustainable development and an example of the struggle to preserve the harmony of the landscape as one of its elements."			
Enteromius mandelai Kambikambi, Kadye & Chakona, 2021	Fish	Nelson Mandela	A species of barb "named after South Africa's first democratically elected head of state, President Nelson Rolihlahla Mandela, who was from the Eastern Cape Province, where this species is endemic. The species is named in honour and recognition of his legacy and selfless contribution towards promotion of peace, democracy, human rights, equality, social justice and sustainable development."			
Etheostoma jimmycarter Layman & Mayden, 2012	Fish	Jimmy Carter	The scientific name of the bluegrass darter, endemic to the Green River (Kentucky) drainage, honors Carter for "his environmental leadership and accomplishments in the areas of national energy policy and wilderness protection, and his lifelong commitment to social justice and basic human rights".			
Eubranchus steinbecki Behrens, 1987	Sea slug	John Steinbeck	Named "to give recognition to the author and philosopher John Steinbeck [...], the man who not only influenced the works of Edward "Doc" Ricketts, but was himself so greatly influenced by Doc that some have speculated that Steinbeck may have joined the ranks of our colleagues had it not been for Ricketts['s] untimely death. Together they wrote The Sea of Cortez and were near completion of The Outer Shores". Subsequently transferred to genus Capellinia.			
Eurybia gonzaga Dolibaina, Dias, Mielke & Casagrande, 2014	Butterfly	Luiz Gonzaga	"This species honors Luiz Gonzaga (1912–1989), a Brazilian composer and musician popularly known as the "king of baião" (a folk rhythm from northeastern Brazil) born in the state of Pernambuco, region of all known specimens."			
Euryopis mallah Zakerzade, Moradmand & Jäger, 2022	Spider	Mahlagha Mallah	A cobweb spider from Iran, "named in honour of Mahlagha Mallah (1917–2021), an environmental activist who was referred to as the "Mother of Iran's Environment". She was the founder of the Women's Society Against Environmental Pollution based in Iran."			
Euschistus (Mitripus) saramagoi Bianchi, Cioato & Grazia, 2015	True bug	José Saramago	A stink bug from Brazil, "Named in honor of José Saramago, for his contribution to literature. This late Portuguese writer, who had received the Nobel Prize in Literature 1998, was responsible for the spread of prose in Portuguese around the [world]." Subsequently transferred to genus Adustonotus.			
Evita Capps, 1943	Moth	Eva Perón				
Fanteichthys † Carnevale, 2007	Fish	John Fante	A genus of fossil codlings from the Miocene of Torricella Peligna, Italy. The name honours Italian-American writer John Fante, whose parents came from Torricella Peligna; plus the suffix ichthys, Greek for "fish".			
Filistatinella kahloae Magalhaes & Ramírez, 2017	Spider	Frida Kahlo	This species is native to Mexico.			
Fujuriphyes dalii Cepeda, Sánchez & Pardos, 2019	Mud dragon	Salvador Dalí	"The name is dedicated to the prominent Spanish surrealist Salvador Dalí (1904–1989), whose peculiar moustache resembles the shape of the lateral terminal spines of the species."			
Ganaspidium flemingi Buffington, 2010	Wasp	Ian Fleming	The holotype was collected in the Bahamas, where Fleming was a "long time resident".			
Garjainia madiba † Gower et al., 2014	Archosaur	Nelson Mandela	A fossil erythrosuchid reptile from the Triassic of South Africa, "named in honour of Nelson Mandela (1918–2013), the first fully representatively democratically elected president of South Africa (1994–1999). Mr Mandela was known affectionately as "Madiba"."			
Gehyra leopoldi Brongersma, 1930	Lizard	Leopold III of Belgium				
Geophagus harreri Gosse, 1976	Fish	Heinrich Harrer	"This new species is cordially dedicated to Professor H. Harrer from Kitzbühel, in gratitude for his help during ichthyological missions, among others in Surinam and French Guiana where this species was collected."			
Gibbacousteau jacquesi Espinosa & Ortea, 2013	Sea snail	Jacques Cousteau	"Named in honour of Commander Jacques-Yves Cousteau, pioneer explorer of the marine environment, to whom we owe the perpetual opening of the frontier between sea and land. [...] [W]e baptise this species in homage to the man who [...] almost 50 years ago, started the Precontinente III experiment, where six oceananauts lived together for 30 days at a depth of 100 m."			
Gibberula delarrochae Ortea, 2015	Sea snail	Alicia de Larrocha	One of 21 sea snails of the genus Gibberula concurrently named after female winners of the Prince of Asturias Awards (see also List of organisms named after famous people (born 1925–1949), List of organisms named after famous people (born 1950–1974) and List of organisms named after famous people (born 1975–present)). (Note: Of the 21 women honoured, 3 are in this section of the list, 9 are in the List of organisms named after famous people (born 1925–1949), 5 are in the List of organisms named after famous people (born 1950–1974), 2 are in the List of organisms named after famous people (born 1975–present) and the remaining two are not listed because they are natural scientists: Jane Goodall (Gibberula goodallae) and Linda R. Watkins (Gibberula watkinsae).). "Named in honour of pianist Alicia de Larrocha (Barcelona, Spain, 1923–2009), winner of the 1994 Prince of Asturias Award for the Arts, renowned for her masterly interpretations of works by Spanish composers such as Manuel de Falla, Isaac Albéniz and Enrique Granados."			
Gibberula lessingae Ortea, 2015	Sea snail	Doris Lessing	One of 21 sea snails of the genus Gibberula concurrently named after female winners of the Prince of Asturias Awards. "Named in honour of British writer Doris Lessing (Kermanshah, Iran 1919 – London, 2013), winner of the 2001 Prince of Asturias Award for Literature; author of works such as the Children of Violence series and The Golden Notebook, considered the Bible of feminism, she was awarded the Nobel Prize for Literature in 2007."			
Gibberula zambranoae Ortea, 2015	Sea snail	María Zambrano	One of 21 sea snails of the genus Gibberula concurrently named after female winners of the Prince of Asturias Awards. "Named in honour of philosopher María Zambrano (Vélez-Málaga, Spain, 1904–1991), exile and neighbour of Calzada, Havana, between 1948 and 1953 [where the zoologist who named this species had established his base of operations], winner of the 1981 Prince of Asturias Award for Communication and Humanities, author of works such as Claros del bosque or De la aurora, where her philosophical proposal takes on a mystical air."			
Gibbonsia elegans erroli Hubbs, 1952	Fish	Errol Flynn	Errol Flynn, whose father Theodore Flynn was an eminent marine biologist, sponsored the expedition aboard his yacht Zaca during which the holotype for this subspecies of kelpfish was collected. Currently, sources differ on whether it should be a synonym of Gibbonsia elegans, or treated as a separate species with the name Gibbonsia erroli.			
Gibbonsia norae Hubbs, 1952	Fish	Nora Eddington	Nora Eddington, Errol Flynn's second wife, was also present aboard the yacht Zaca in the expedition that collected the holoype. Subsequently synonymised with Gibbonsia montereyensis.			
Glycera sheikhmujibi Hossain & Hutchings, 2020	Polychaete worm	Sheikh Mujibur Rahman	A marine bloodworm endemic to Bangladesh.			
Glyptotermes magsaysayi Snyder, 1958	Termite	Ramon Magsaysay	This species is endemic to Luzon island in the Philippines. It was named posthumously in honor of Magsaysay one year after his death in the 1957 Cebu Douglas C-47 crash.			
Godartiana amadoi Paluch, Zacca & Freitas, 2016	Butterfly	Jorge Amado	A species native to Northeastern Brazil, named "in honour of the famous Brazilian writer, Jorge Leal Amado de Faria, known as Jorge Amado [...]. Jorge Amado was born in Itabuna, Bahia, Brazil, and occupied a chair of the Brazilian Academy of Letters from 1961 to 2001. He wrote more than 30 books, being best known worldwide by his notable books, Gabriela, cravo e canela [English title: Gabriela, Clove and Cinnamon], Capitães de Areia [Captains of the Sands] and Tieta. Furthermore, Jorge Amado also made a great contribution to cultural and social development through the establishment of the 'House of Jorge Amado Foundation' in Salvador, Bahia."			
Haplochromis nyererei Witte-Maas & Witte, 1985	Fish	Julius Nyerere	Subsequently transferred to genus Pundamilia (though not all classifications recognise this change).			
Harryhausenia † Boyko, 2004	Crustacean	Ray Harryhausen	A genus of fossil crabs from the Oligocene of Italy. "Named for the great dynamator of fantasy film, Ray Harryhausen, in recognition of his long career during which he brought the imaginary to life on the screen."			
Hemistomia shostakovichi Haase & Bouchet, 1998	Freshwater snail	Dmitri Shostakovich	"Dmitri Shostakovich (1906–1975) is one of the favourite composers of the first author."			
Heteronychia dayani Lehrer, 1996	Fly	Moshe Dayan	This species was described from a specimen collected in Israel; subsequently synonymised with Sarcophaga kerteszi.			
Heterospilus reagani Marsh, 2013	Wasp	Ronald Reagan				
Heterothele erdosi Sherwood & Gallon, 2025	Spider	Paul Erdős	"The specific epithet is an eponym in honour of the legendary Hungarian mathematician Paul Erdős (1913–1996) who published over 1500 papers, making him the most prolific mathematical researcher who ever lived. Erdős was famous for his love of collaboration and worked with quite literally hundreds of coauthors, spurning the invention of the Erdős number, which charts mathematical collaboration. Equally famous was his lifelong nomadic travel between institutions, the high quality of his research, his affection for colleagues, and his endearing eccentricities. The dedication Erdős gave to his field of mathematics is a constant inspiration and example to the author DS in her field of arachnology."			
Hyboserica madiba Fabrizi, Eberle & Ahrens, 2019	Beetle	Nelson Mandela	This species is native to South Africa.			
Hydraena hillaryi Skale & Jäch, 2009	Beetle	Edmund Hillary	A minute moss beetle "Named for Sir Edmund P. Hillary [...], who died in early 2008, exactly when the description of this species was compiled. In 1953, Sir Edmund Hillary and Tenzing Norgay became the first climbers to reach the summit of Mount Everest. Hillary devoted much of his life to helping the Sherpa people of Nepal by founding the "Himalayan Trust". Through his efforts, schools and small hospitals were built in remote regions of Nepal. Furthermore, Hillary was Honorary President of "Mountain Wilderness", a world-wide organization for preservation of mountain environment. Hydraena hillaryi lives near the foot of Mount Everest."			
Hydraena nelsonmandelai Makhan, 2008	Beetle	Nelson Mandela				
Hydroptila florestani Souza, Santos & Takiya, 2014	Caddisfly	Florestan Fernandes	A Brazilian microcaddisfly "named in honor of the sociologist Florestan Fernandes, who published many texts opposing the Brazilian Military Government and coordinated the "Escola Paulista de Sociologia" from 1964 to 1969."			
Hydroptila marighellai Souza, Santos & Takiya, 2014	Caddisfly	Carlos Marighella	A Brazilian microcaddisfly "named in honor of Carlos Marighella, founder of the "Ação Libertadora Nacional", an movement of opposition to the Brazilian Military Government (1964–1985)."			
Hylomyrma lispectorae Ulysséa, 2021	Ant	Clarice Lispector	"named after Clarice Lispector (1920–1977), born Chaya Pinkhasovna Lispector, a Ukrainian-Brazilian novelist, poetess, and short story writer— "Liberdade é pouco. O que eu desejo ainda não tem nome"."			
Ichneumon goeppertae Kittel, 2016	Wasp	Maria Goeppert Mayer	Replacement name for Ichneumon denticulator Thunberg, 1822, which was preoccupied by Ichneumon denticulator Müller, 1776.			
Ichneumon hodgkinae Kittel, 2016	Wasp	Dorothy Hodgkin	Replacement name for Ichneumon punctulatus Pfeffer, 1913, which was preoccupied by Ichneumon punctulatus Geoffroy, 1785.			
Ichneumon vaughanae Kittel, 2016	Wasp	Dorothy Vaughan	Replacement name for Ichneumon bipunctatus Cuvier, 1833, which was preoccupied by Ichneumon bipunctatus Gmelin, 1790.			
Ichneumon yalowae Kittel, 2016	Wasp	Rosalyn Yalow	Replacement name for Ichneumon varius Gmelin, 1790, which was preoccupied by Ichneumon varius Pontoppidan, 1763.			
Impatiens achudanandanii V.S.A. Kumar, M.G. Govind & Sindhu Arya	Flowering plant	V. S. Achuthanandan	A balsamine native to Kerala, India, "named in honor of Mr. V.S. Achudanandan, former Chief Minister of the state of Kerala for his ardent efforts in conservation of the pristine environment of Western Ghats, especially Mathikettan Shola."			
Inocybe dagamae Fachada, Beja-Pereira & Vila-Viçosa, 2023	Fungus	Sebastião da Gama	"Named after Sebastião da Gama, poet and ecologist who dedicated his life to promote and preserve the mountain range harbouring this species."			
Ipomoea kahloae Gonz.-Martínez, Lozada-Pérez & Rios-Carr.	Flowering plant	Frida Kahlo	A morning glory from Mexico, whose name "honors the Mexican artist Frida Kahlo (1907–1954), one of the most influential Latin American artists of the 20th century. Frida Kahlo, besides being a painter, participated in many cultural, academic and political activities and was a social activist. Kahlo revived the roots of Mexican popular art and became a cultural reference point for the people of Mexico and its national identity." Originally described as Ipomoea kahloiae, subsequently amended.			
Janibacter hoylei Shivaji et al., 2009	Bacterium	Fred Hoyle	A bacterium isolated from cryotubes used to collect air samples from the upper atmosphere at altitudes between 27 and 41 km., "named after Sir Fred Hoyle, the famous English astronomer", who was one of the main proponents of the theory of panspermia. Research was funded by ISRO (Indian Space Research Organisation).			
Juratelacrima ballingi † Fanti & Damgaard, 2018	Beetle	Erik Balling	A fossil soldier beetle found in Eocene Baltic amber.			
Kahlerosphaera faludyi † Kozur, Moix & Ozsvárt, 2007	Protist	György Faludy	A fossil radiolarian from the Triassic of Turkey.			
Kahlerosphaera karinthyi † Kozur, Moix & Ozsvárt, 2007	Protist	Ferenc Karinthy	A fossil radiolarian from the Triassic of Turkey.			
Kahlerosphaera koestleri † Kozur, Moix & Ozsvárt, 2007	Protist	Arthur Koestler	A fossil radiolarian from the Triassic of Turkey.			
Kahlerosphaera rejtoei † Kozur, Moix & Ozsvárt, 2007	Protist	Jenő Rejtő	A fossil radiolarian from the Triassic of Turkey.			
Kahlerosphaera szerbi † Kozur, Moix & Ozsvárt, 2007	Protist	Antal Szerb	A fossil radiolarian from the Triassic of Turkey.			
Kahlerosphaera vonneguti † Kozur, Moix & Ozsvárt, 2007	Protist	Kurt Vonnegut	A fossil radiolarian from the Triassic of Turkey.			
Kokoppia mandelai Hugo-Coetzee, 2014	Mite	Nelson Mandela	A species found in Golden Gate Highlands National Park, South Africa "named in honor of the late Mr Nelson Mandela, former president of South Africa. He wrote about the Free State (in which Golden Gate is situated) in his autobiography, Long Walk to Freedom, the following: "The province of the Orange Free State has always had a magical effect on me....the Free State's landscape gladdens my heart no matter what my mood. When I am there, I feel that nothing can shut me in, that my thoughts can roam as far and wide as the horizons" (Mandela 1994)."			
Komagataella mondaviorum Naumov, Naumova & Boundy-Mills, 2018	Yeast	Robert Mondavi and Margrit Mondavi	"named in honor of the late Robert and Margrit Mondavi, honoring their tremendous impact on the CA wine industry and their generous and forward-thinking support of facilities and programs at the University of California Davis [where the strain was identified]."			
Koristocetus pescei † Collareta et al., 2017	Whale	Hugo Pesce	A fossil small sperm whale from the Miocene of Peru, whose name "honors the memory and heritage of Hugo Pesce Pescetto (1900–1969), Peruvian physician, politician, writer, and "hero of public health in Peru" [...], who occupied a position of professor at the Universidad Nacional Mayor de San Marcos, Lima."			
Krithe nerudai † Bergue, Coimbra & Finger, 2019	Crustacean	Pablo Neruda	A fossil ostracod from the Miocene of Chile, named "In honor of Pablo Neruda (1904–1973), an eminent Chilean poet, diplomat, and politician whose poetry often ex-pressed his love of the sea."			
Lagenopolycystis mandelai Willems & Artois, 2017	Flatworm	Nelson Mandela	A species from South Africa named "in honour of Nelson Mandela (1918–2013), famous anti-apartheid activist, Nobel Peace Prize laureate (1993, together with Frederik Willem de Klerk) and former president of South Africa (1994–1999)."			
Lampanyctus steinbecki Bolin, 1939	Fish	John Steinbeck	Rolf L. Bolin, the ichthyologist who described this species, was a friend of John Steinbeck (a serious amateur naturalist himself, who enjoyed studying the aquatic life of Monterey Bay and the Gulf of California). He received a signed first edition of one of Steinbeck's novels, and, touched by the gesture, decided to name a newly-discovered species of lanternfish after Steinbeck to honor him in return. However, soon afterwards, Steinbeck asked for the book back (for unknown reasons) and never returned it. Later, Bolin stated that he spent a great deal of time thereafter trying to synonymise L. steinbecki with any other species (thus invalidating the name), but did not succeed.			
Lasioseius jorgeamadoi Santos & Argolo, 2018	Mite	Jorge Amado	"This species is named in memory of Jorge Amado, one of the most famous Brazilian writers, born near the type locality of this species."			
Leistus lesteri Allegro, 2007	Beetle	Lester Young	"I dedicate this species to the jazz tenor saxophonist Lester Young, master of musical poetry."			
Leporinus villasboasorum Burns et al., 2017	Fish	Villas-Bôas brothers	"Named in honor of Orlando, Cláudio and Leonardo Villas-Bôas, in recognition of their pioneering efforts to conserve and protect the rio Xingu's marvelous biodiversity, of which Leporinus villasboasorum forms part."			
Lepthercus mandelai Ríos-Tamayo & Lyle, 2020	Spider	Nelson Mandela	A mygalomorph spider from South Africa, named "in honor of Nelson Rolihlahla Mandela, first president of the democratic, post-apartheid South Africa."			
Leptomorphus mandelai Borkent & Wheeler, 2012	Fly	Nelson Mandela	A fungus gnat from South Africa, "named in honour of former South African President Nelson R. Mandela, in recognition of his role in ending apartheid in South Africa and for his advocacy of peace, reconciliation and social justice."			
Leptus etesamiae Kiany, Seiedy & Hakimitabar, 2024	Mite	Parvin E'tesami	A species from Iran, "named in memory of Parvin Etesami, also known as Rakhshandeh Etesami, an Iranian 20th-century Persian poet who is famous mainly for her debate (monazara) in her Diwan (book of poetry)"			
Liolaemus basadrei Valladares-Faúndez et al., 2021	Lizard	Jorge Basadre	This species was described from specimens collected in Jorge Basadre province, Tacna region, Peru; "We dedicate this species to Jorge Basadre Grohmann (1903–1980), a distinguished Peruvian historian and native of Tacna who wrote important works on the culture and history of Peru. Currently the National University of Tacna bears his name, as does one of the regional provinces of southern Peru."			
Lucanus aungsani Zilioli, 2000	Beetle	Aung San	A stag beetle from Myanmar, "named in honour of the late great patriot U Aung San, father of Myanmar independence."			
Luluichnus † Salisbury et al., 2017	Dinosaur	Paddy Roe	A Stegosaur ichnogenus described from tracks found in the Cretaceous Broome Sandstone of Kimberley (Western Australia), whose "name honors the late Paddy Roe OAM, who also went by the name Lulu. Roe was a Nyikina and Goolarabooloo Elder, and former Traditional Custodian and Maja (Law Boss) for Jabirrjabirr, Ngumbarl, and Djugun countries, the Northern and the Southern tradition of the Song Cycle, and the dinosaurian tracks of the Broome Sandstone."			
Lumieria antonionii Benedetti & Pinto-da-Rocha, 2022	Harvestman	Michelangelo Antonioni				
Lunaceps rothkoi Gustafsson & Olsson, 2012	Louse	Mark Rothko	"Named in honour of the painter Mark Rothko (1903–1970), whose painting Saffron (1957) is somewhat reminiscent of the colouration and distribution of dark and light areas in the head of the holotype. He is also one of the first author's favourite painters."			
Mahajanganella fridakahloae Lorenz, Loria, Harvey & Harms, 2022	Pseudoscorpion	Frida Kahlo	"This species is named after the Mexican artist Frida Kahlo de Rivera († 1954) whose unmistakable character were her striking eyebrows, which she included in many of her self-portraits. The species is reminiscent of her because of the strongly granulated cuticle above the second pair of eyes, which resemble 'eyebrows'."			
Maisorthina saroyani † García-Alcalde, 2015	Brachiopod	William Saroyan	A fossil orthid from the Devonian of Spain, "dedicated to William Saroyan, a North American writer of Armenian origin, whose stories of great humanity captivated the author and continue to do so today."			
Mandelara Malzacher & Staniczek, 2016	Mayfly	Nelson Mandela	A genus from South Africa.			
Mandelia Valdés & Gosliner, 1999	Sea slug	Nelson Mandela	"This South African genus is named Mandelia to honor Nelson Mandela, who led the struggle for a multiracial government in South Africa."			
Mastophora dizzydeani Eberhard, 1981	Spider	Dizzy Dean	A bolas spider that uses a sticky ball on the end of a thread to catch its prey. "Since this spider's livelihood depends on throwing a ball fast and accurately, it seems appropriate to name it in honor of one of the greatest baseball pitchers of all time, Jerome "Dizzy" Dean."			
Meenoplus roddenberryi Hoch & Naranjo, 2012	True bug	Gene Roddenberry	A cave-dwelling species of planthopper named "in honour of Gene Roddenberry (1921–1991), creator and producer of the famous U.S. science fiction tv-series Star Trek. The mission of its starship Enterprise "... to explore strange new worlds, to seek out new life ..., to boldly go where no one has gone before" applies – as much as to space – to biospeleology. Gene Roddenberry was fascinated by the exploration of the unknown, and we are sure he would be delighted about the discovery of the new life form described here."			
Megastigmus herndoni Girault, 1935	Wasp	Angelo Herndon				
Melloleitaoina yupanqui Perafán & Pérez-Miles, 2014	Spider	Atahualpa Yupanqui	A species of tarantula described from specimens collected near Pergamino, Argentina, where Yupanqui was born. Subsequently transferred to genus Tmesiphantes.			
Menabites tsirananai † Collignon, 1969	Ammonite	Philibert Tsiranana	A fossil species from the Cretaceous of Madagascar, "dedicated to Mr. Tsiranana, President of the Malagasy Republic, to thank him for all that Malagasy Geology owes him, in which he continues to take an interest in its research and its multiple applications."			
Mesabolivar amadoi Huber, 2018	Spider	Jorge Amado	A cellar spider from Brazil, "Named for Jorge Amado (1912–2001), Brazilian writer, author of Gabriela, Cravo e Canela."			
Mesabolivar claricae Huber, 2018	Spider	Clarice Lispector	A cellar spider from Brazil, "Named for Clarice Lispector (1920–1977), Brazilian writer, daughter of Russian-Jewish immigrants, author of Perto do coração selvagem."			
Mesochorus elionae Kittel, 2016	Wasp	Gertrude B. Elion	Replacement name for Mesochorus niger (Dasch, 1974), which had originally been described as Piestetron nigrum Dasch, 1974, and was transferred to the genus Mesochorus in 1993; when Plectochorus niger Kusigemati, 1967 was transferred to the same genus in 1997, becoming Mesochorus niger (Kusigemati, 1967), Mesochorus niger (Dasch, 1974) became a junior homonym.			
Mesochorus leviae Kittel, 2016	Wasp	Rita Levi-Montalcini	Replacement name for Mesochorus inflatus Schwenke, 1999, which was preoccupied by Mesochorus inflatus Dasch, 1971.			
Metasarcus bergmani Benedetti & Pinto-da-Rocha, 2022	Harvestman	Ingmar Bergman				
Metasarcus fellinii Benedetti & Pinto-da-Rocha, 2022	Harvestman	Federico Fellini				
Metasarcus kurosawai Benedetti & Pinto-da-Rocha, 2022	Harvestman	Akira Kurosawa				
Micromelanconis kaihuiae C.M. Tian & N. Jiang (2021)	Fungus	Yang Kaihui	"Named after Kaihui Yang, a Chinese heroine; Kaihui is also the name of the town where holotype was collected."			
Microporella madiba Florence, Hayward & Gibbons, 2007	Bryozoan	Nelson Mandela	"Xhoza clan name (sometimes used to refer to elder men of the clan). Named after the great South African president Nelson Rholihlala Mandela who spent 28 years on the type locality, Robben Island, owing to the injustices of Apartheid."			
Mitromica carildae Espinosa & Ortea, 2018	Sea snail	Carilda Oliver Labra	Species described from specimens collected in Varadero beach, Matanzas Province, Cuba, "Named in honour of the Matanzas poet Carilda Oliver Labra, for her 96 years of fruitful life, whose work, full of the purest and most delicate feminine sensuality, is a true hymn to love and life."			
Mizotrechus edithpiafae Erwin, 2011	Beetle	Edith Piaf	"based on the full name of Edith Piaf, the famous French singer [...], whose voice had an incredible range of diversity, as is that found in the carabid species richness of Guyane, and who sang a variety of "torch songs", and here I play on the word "torch", the same word that applies to what is used to ignite the trees of the unique tropical rainforests of South America, an Armageddon in our own times."			
Modisimus mariposas Huber & Fischer, 2010	Spider	Mirabal sisters	A cellar spider from the Dominican Republic, whose name "honours the Mirabal sisters, who fervently opposed the dictatorship of Trujillo, and formed a group of opponents known as Las Mariposas (The Butterflies). Three of them were assassinated in 1960".			
Modisimus miri Huber & Fischer, 2010	Spider	Pedro Mir	A cellar spider from the Dominican Republic.			
Modisimus roumaini Huber, 2010	Spider	Jacques Roumain	A cellar spider from Haiti, whose name "honours Jacques Roumain (1907–1944), author of Masters of the Dew, about a young Haitian man's effort to save a once-thriving community from drought and family feuds."			
Monomorium elghazalyi Sharaf & Aldawood, 2017	Ant	Mohammed al-Ghazali				
Munidopsis mandelai Macpherson, Amon & Clark, 2014	Crustacean	Nelson Mandela	A squat lobster from the Southwest Indian Ridge, "named for Nelson Rolihlahla Mandela, South African anti-apartheid revolutionary, President of South Africa from 1994 to 1999, Father of a Nation, Elder Statesman, and a remarkable man."			
Murphyarachne ymasumacae Sherwood & Gabriel, 2022	Spider	Yma Sumac	A tarantula from Peru named "in honour of Yma Sumac (1922–2008), the famous Peruvian opera singer whose voice spanned an incredible five octaves."			
Myrmica aimonissabaudiae Menozzi, 1939	Ant	Prince Aimone, Duke of Aosta	"from the first name Aimone combined with Sabaudi (meaning Savoyan). It is dedicated to the leader of the Italian Expedition to the Karakorum [sic, actually Karakoram], 1929, which collected the type material. He was an Italian Prince, HRH Aimone Roberto Margarita Guiseppe Torino Prince of Savoy-Aosta, Duke di Spoleto, 4th Duke d'Aosta. He was later proclaimed HM Tomislav II of Croatia but abandoned claims to the throne in 1943 and died in Buenos Aires in 1948."			
Naarda uthanti Tóth & Ronkay, 2015	Moth	U Thant	This species is native to Burma/Myanmar.			
Nama ginobartalii Meregalli & Borovec, 2023	Weevil	Gino Bartali	"Gino Bartali (1914–2000) was a champion road cyclist. Bartali earned respect for his work helping Jews who were being persecuted by the Nazis during the time of the Italian Social Republic and used his fame to carry messages and documents to the Italian Resistance. In 2013 he was awarded the honorific Righteous Among the Nations."			
Nama startorum Meregalli & Borovec, 2023	Weevil	FC Start	"In 1942 in Kiev, under Nazi occupation, former footballers linked to the resistance organised a football team, named START F.C. The Nazis organised a tournament with five other teams, all linked to the Nazi regime. The START team won all the competitions, thus providing strong psychological support for the civil resistance against the invaders. The species is dedicated to these sportsmen and, by extension, to people fighting for their freedom."			
Nannospalax kemali Matur et al., 2026	Rodent	Yaşar Kemal	A blind mole-rat from Anatolia, Turkey, "dedicated to the world-renowned Turkish author Yaşar Kemal (1923–2015), whose epic novels, particularly Memed, My Hawk, immortalized the landscapes and people of Anatolia. This name honors his profound connection to the Turkish soil and its hidden life."			
Nannospalax mursalogluae Matur et al., 2026	Rodent	Bahtiye Musluoğlu	A blind mole-rat from Anatolia, Turkey, named to "commemorate her lifelong dedication to zoology, her courage in field conservation, and her role as a mentor and inspiration to generations of scientists and naturalists". Born Bahtiye Kollu, she was known as Bahtiye Musluoğlu during her sports career in her youth, having taken her first husband's surname, and as Bahtiye Mursaloğlu during her subsequent academic career as a zoologist, with her second husband's surname.			
Neocybaeina burnetti Bennett, 2023	Spider	Howlin' Wolf	Howlin Wolf's birth name was Chester Burnett. The conservation status of this species is unknown; it was described based on specimens collected in 1959 (64 years before their formal description), and no more have been found since.			
Neotrichia feolai Santos & Nessimian, 2009	Caddisfly	Vicente Feola	One of twelve Brazilian species of microcaddisflies named in commemoration of the 50th anniversary of the first FIFA World Cup won by Brazil (Sweden '58), after the eleven players that participated in the final match and the team coach (see also List of organisms named after famous people (born 1925–1949)). "This species is named in honor of Vicente Ítalo Feola, coach of the Brazilian team of 1958."			
Neoxyphinus saarineni Moss & Bonaldo, 2016	Spider	Eero Saarinen	"The specific name is a patronym honoring the architect Eero Saarinen, who projected the Gateway Arch, in St. Louis, USA, and refers to the resemblance of the shape of the sternal transversal ridge in this species with the outline of that monument."			
Nereis saramagoi Bergamo et al., 2023	Polychaete worm	José Saramago	"The species name is a tribute to the Portuguese writer José Saramago, who wrote the novel 'Ensaio sobre a cegueira' ('Blindness' in English). The absence of eyes and consequent blindness of the members of the species is likened to the blindness of the characters in the novel."			
Neruda Turner, 1976	Butterfly	Pablo Neruda	A subgenus of the genus Heliconius. "In continuance of [the] tradition [of using names associated with poetry and the arts for the genus Heliconius], and recalling that the butterflies are South American, the new subgenus is named after the author of Alturas de Macchu Picchu, Veinte Poemas de Amor, Residencia en la Tierra etc. Señor Pablo Neruda graciously consented to the use of his name, although sadly he did not live to see this paper written."			
Nerudia Huber, 2000	Spider	Pablo Neruda	A genus of cellar spiders native to Chile and Argentina.			
Nerudiella Porto, Derkarabetian, Giribet & Pérez-González, 2024	Harvestman	Pablo Neruda	This genus is native to Chile.			
Nesticus dykemanae Hedin & Milne, 2023	Spider	Wilma Dykeman	A scaffold web spider endemic to a small area of the Great Smoky Mountains National Park on the border between Tennessee and North Carolina, USA, "Named to honor Wilma Dykeman (1920–2006), a writer, speaker, teacher, historian, and environmentalist who spent most of her life in western North Carolina and eastern Tennessee. Mrs. Dykeman was devoted to social justice and environmental integrity, discussing Appalachian water pollution in her classic 1955 book The French Broad, and sharing a social justice award in 1957 for her co-authored book Neither Black Nor White."			
Newinia Thaung (1973)	Fungus	Ne Win	This genus of rusts, found in Africa and Asia, was described from specimens collected in Burma.			
Niesslia hepworthiae Crous (2025)	Fungus	Barbara Hepworth	"Named in honour of the English artist and sculptor, Dame Jocelyn Barbara Hepworth (10 January 1903 – 20 May 1975). The fungus was collected in the garden next to her studio, in St Ives, Cornwall, England."			
Noergaardia † Fanti & Damgaard, 2018	Beetle	Lise Nørgaard	A genus of fossil soldier beetles found in Eocene Baltic amber, "named in honour of the Danish author, journalist, debater and scriptwriter Lise Nørgaard [...] as congratulation for her 100th birthday (1917–2017) and in honour of her decades of contributions to the Danish cultural treasure chest. She is a pioneer in consumer journalism, has fought for women's rights and equality and, with her strong personality, has influenced and impacted Danish culture."			
Nordus elytisi Chatzimanolis, 2004	Beetle	Odysseas Elytis				
Nordus seferisi Chatzimanolis, 2004	Beetle	Giorgos Seferis				
Oblitosaurus bunnueli † Sánchez-Fenollosa, Verdú & Cobos, 2023	Dinosaur	Luis Buñuel	An iguanodontian from the Jurassic of eastern Spain. The name "honours Luis Buñuel, a prestigious Spanish film director born in the province of Teruel." (where the fossils were found).			
Oedichirus sihanouki Rougemont, 2018	Beetle	Norodom Sihanouk	This species is native to Cambodia.			
Oiclus cousteaui Ythier, 2019	Scorpion	Jacques Cousteau	The name "honours Mr. Jacques-Yves Cousteau (1910-1997), French oceanographic explorer, for his contribution to the creation of the National Park of Pigeon, also called Cousteau reserve, where the new species was found."			
Ombilinichthys yamini † Murray et al., 2015	Fish	Mohammad Yamin	A fossil gourami from Eocene deposits found in Talawi, Sumatra, Indonesia, "Named for Mohammad Yamin (1903–1962), historian, poet, playwright, and politician, who was born in Talawi, and was named a 'National Hero of Indonesia' in part for his role during the Indonesian Revolution for Independence."			
Orcus frommi Łączyński, 2012	Beetle	Erich Fromm				
Orcus popperi Łączyński, 2012	Beetle	Karl Popper				
Orsonwelles Hormiga, 2002	Spider	Orson Welles	Many of the species are named after elements from Welles' films.			
Orwellium Johnson, Masner & Musetti, 2009	Wasp	George Orwell	A genus of parasitoid wasps from Chile, whose name "honors the author George Orwell, the brilliant and seemingly clairvoyant writer of political science fiction".			
Otacilia loriot Jäger & Wunderlich, 2012	Spider	Loriot	"dedicated to the late Vicco von Bülow (pseudonym: Loriot) acknowledging his tremendous contributions to German humour."			
Ozcopa chiunei Raven, 2015	Spider	Chiune Sugihara				
Ozicrypta tuckeri Raven & Churchill, 1994	Spider	Perc Tucker	A brushed trapdoor spider endemic to Queensland, Australia, named "for Mr Perc Tucker, 1919–1980, Member of the Legislative Assembly for Townsville North, 1960–1969, for Townsville West 1969–1974, Deputy Leader of the Opposition 1966–1974, Leader 1974, Mayor of Townsville 1970–1980 [sic, actually 1976–1980], who was well known in the Townsville region [the type locality] and highly respected for his many contributions to the community."			
Pamphobeteus urvinae Sherwood, Gabriel, Brescovit & Lucas, 2022	Spider	Hermelinda Urvina	A tarantula from Ecuador named "in honour of Hermelinda Urvina Mayorga (1905–2008), an Ecuadorian aviator who was the first woman in South America to earn a pilot licence. She was also a friend of the pioneering American aviator Amelia Earhart (1897–1937)."			
Paranarthrura cousteaui García-Herrero, Esquete & Cunha, 2021	Crustacean	Jacques Cousteau	"This species is named in honour to Jacques-Yves Cousteau (1910–1997), for his life-long intensive work in raising awareness to the sea life and great contributions to the knowledge of the marine environment."			
Papasula abbotti costelloi † Steadman et al., 1988	Bird	Lou Costello	An extinct subspecies whose remains have been found in the Marquesas islands, named in allusion to comedy team Abbott and Costello; however, the patronym abbotti honors ornithologist William Louis Abbott, not Bud Abbott.			
Paramicromerys rabeariveloi Huber, 2003	Spider	Jean-Joseph Rabearivelo	A cellar spider from Madagascar, "Named for Jean-Joseph Rabearivelo (1901–37), gifted Malagasy poet whose struggle against a severe colonial system cut short his work and, eventually, his life."			
Parastacus mingusi Falqueto & Ribeiro, 2025	Crustacean	Charles Mingus	A crayfish from Brazil, "named in honor of bassist, composer and bandleader Charles Mingus (1922–1979), for his contribution to music and his denouncement of injustice through art. His crayfish-like pizzicato technique and his drive to innovate created a legacy that few musicians in the hard bop movement could rival."			
Parnassius imperator aungsani Nose & Mikami, 1998	Butterfly	Aung San				
Patellapis mandela Timmermann & Kuhlmann, 2009	Bee	Nelson Mandela	This species has only been found in Richtersveld National Park, South Africa.			
Peloridinannus curly Weirauch & Frankenberg, 2015	True bug	Curly Howard	Three species of schizopterid bugs were named, because of their "comical appearance", after the 1932–1946 Three Stooges (see also List of organisms named after famous people (born 1800–1899) for P. moe).			
Peloridinannus larry Weirauch & Frankenberg, 2015	True bug	Larry Fine	Three species of schizopterid bugs were named, because of their "comical appearance", after the 1932–1946 Three Stooges (see also List of organisms named after famous people (born 1800–1899) for P. moe).			
Peresiella ellae Magalhães, Lavesque & Lamarque, 2024	Polychaete worm	Ella Fitzgerald	"This species is dedicated to jazz singer Ella Fitzgerald, as much for her major contribution to music as for her involvement in civil rights."			
Pholcus jusahi Huber, 2011	Spider	Franklin Gritts	A cellar spider native to North Carolina, USA. Gritts was also known as Oau Nah Jusah ("They Have Returned" in Cherokee)			
Photinus fridakhaloae Zaragoza-Caballero & González-Ramírez, 2023	Firefly	Frida Kahlo	This species, described from a holotype collected in Jalisco, Mexico, was "dedicated to the renowned Mexican painter and activist Magdalena Carmen Frida Khalo [sic] Calderón, whose paintings have broken frontiers."			
Photinus juanrulfoi Zaragoza-Caballero & Domínguez-León, 2023	Firefly	Juan Rulfo	This species, described from specimens collected in Durango, Mexico, was "dedicated to the outstanding Mexican writer Juan Rulfo, renowned for his works El Llano en llamas and Pedro Páramo."			
Phyllodactylus benedettii Ramírez-Reyes & Flores-Villela, 2018	Lizard	Mario Benedetti	A Mexican species of gecko "dedicated to the memory of the great Uruguayan writer Mario Benedetti in recognition of his prolific literary production and critical thinking of great importance in the political and social life of Latin America."			
Phyllodytes amadoi Vörös, Ribeiro Dias & Solé, 2017	Frog	Jorge Amado	"for Jorge Amado, a Brazilian modernist writer who had an enormous influence on Brazilian literature. He lived in the same region where the new species was discovered and he adored frogs and enjoyed collecting all kinds of objects that were related to them. As a well-travelled man, he grew a big collection of these "frog-souvenirs" from all over the world, which are partially on display in his home in Salvador, Brazil."			
Pipra vilasboasi Sick, 1959	Bird	Villas-Bôas brothers	A manakin from the Amazon rainforest. Subsequently transferred to genus Lepidothrix.			
Pithecopus gonzagai Andrade et al., 2020	Frog	Luiz Gonzaga	"Luiz Gonzaga has been credited for presenting the rich universe of north-eastern musical genres to the rest of the country. He was born and raised in the municipality of Exu, state of Pernambuco, Brazil. Pithecopus gonzagai sp. nov. also occurs in the state of Pernambuco, which is equally its type locality."			
Plataxoides leopoldi Gosse, 1963	Fish	Leopold III of Belgium	A freshwater angelfish species from the Amazon River, named in honor of King Leopold III of Belgium, who sponsored the 1962 Amazon expedition and helped collect the type specimens. Subsequently transferred to genus Pterophyllum.			
Pleisticanthoides piccardorum Ng & Richer de Forges, 2012	Crustacean	Auguste Piccard and Jacques Piccard	"The name honors the Piccard family, Auguste Piccard (1884–1962), the inventor of the bathyscaphe, and his son, Jacques Ernest-Jean Piccard (1922–2008), who, together with U.S. Navy officer Don Walsh, were the first men to dive to a record depth of 10,915 m in the Mariana Trench in the Trieste on January 23, 1960."			
Potamotrygon leopoldi Castex & Castello, 1970	Stingray	Leopold III of Belgium	A South American freshwater stingray known as Xingu River ray, white-blotched river stingray, or polka-dot stingray, named in honor of Leopold III, sponsor of scientific studies at the Institut Royal des Sciences Naturelles de Belgique.			
Potosa elsanto Cruz-López, 2018	Harvestman	El Santo	"in honor to Rodolfo Guzmán Huerta, a.k.a "El Santo", an emblematic Mexican wrestler and actor who was born in Hidalgo, Mexico, where the type locality is located."			
Proctophyllodes carmenmirandae Pedroso & Hernandes, 2021	Mite	Carmen Miranda	A parasitic feather mite that affects the Rufous-collared sparrow (Zonotrichia capensis) in Brazil, "named after the famous Portuguese-born Brazilian female singer Carmen Miranda (1909–1955), who made famous the song "Tico-Tico no Fubá", composed by Zequinha de Abreu in 1917, which is about the Rufous-collared Sparrow (Z. capensis) that is eating her corn meals."			
Promyrmekiaphila korematsui Bond, Jochim, Quayle & Starrett, 2024	Spider	Fred Korematsu	A trapdoor spider from the San Francisco Bay Area, California, named in honor of Oakland-born Fred Toyosaburo Korematsu by UC Davis scientists. "Korematsu was awarded the United States Presidential Medal of Freedom in 1998 in recognition of his lifelong dedication as a civil rights activist and his resistance to the incarceration of Japanese Americans in concentration camps during World War II."			
Protopliomerella bowlesi † McAdams & Adrain, 2011	Trilobite	Paul Bowles				
Protopliomerella kerouaci † McAdams & Adrain, 2011	Trilobite	Jack Kerouac				
Protopliomerella seegeri † McAdams & Adrain, 2011	Trilobite	Pete Seeger				
Protopliomerella stegneri † McAdams & Adrain, 2011	Trilobite	Wallace Stegner				
Proxatrypanius rockefelleri Gilmour, 1959	Beetle	David Rockefeller	This longhorn beetle was described from specimens collected by the David Rockefeller Mexican Expedition of the American Museum of Natural History.			
Psalikilus hestoni † Adrain, McAdams & Westrop, 2009	Trilobite	Charlton Heston				
Pseudostomella mandela Todaro, Perissinotto & Bownes, 2015	Hairyback worm	Nelson Mandela	This species was described from specimens collected in South Africa and "dedicated to the late Nelson Rolihlahla Mandela, the first democratically elected President of South Africa and 1993 Nobel Peace Prize awardee."			
Pseudotanais szymborskae Jakiel, Palero & Błażewicz, 2020	Crustacean	Wisława Szymborska	Identified by scientists of the University of Łódź and "dedicated to Wisława Szymborska, a Polish poet and essayist, a Nobel Prize Laureate in literature."			
Pseudotrogulus pagu DaSilva & Pinto-da-Rocha, 2010	Harvestman	Pagu	A species from São Paulo state, Brazil, named after "Patrícia Galvão, nickname "Pagu" (1910–1962), who was a socialist playwright and modernist writer. She was born and lived in São Paulo state, where she was a feminist symbol and organized worker's struggle."			
Ptenothrix dalii Zeppelini, Ferreira & Oliveira 2020	Springtail	Salvador Dalí	"The name refers to the single pair of labral chaetae, one each side somewhat like the world famous Salvador Dali's moustache."			
Pycnogonum cesairei Sabroux, Hassanin & Corbari, 2022	Sea spider	Aimé Césaire	This species is native to the waters of Martinique.			
Quadrulella madibai Kosakyan et al., 2016	Protist	Nelson Mandela	A species of testate amoeba from South Africa "named to honour Nelson Mandela, the South African revolutionary and later president, who was called Madiba by his friends in reference to the name of his clan."			
Retiro sabatoi Rodríguez-Castro & Rodríguez, 2025	Spider	Ernesto Sabato	"The specific epithet is a patronym in honor of the Argentinian writer Ernesto Sábato for his most famous work of 1948 entitled "El Túnel", since individuals of this species were found inside a tunnel."			
Rhynchocyon chrysopygus mandelai Agwanda et al., 2021	Elephant shrew	Nelson Mandela	A subspecies of the golden-rumped elephant shrew found in Lamu county, Kenya. "Our choice of epithet derives from the severe and persisting insecurity in the taxon range, stemming from decades-long lack of peace in bordering Somaliland [sic; meaning Somalia]. Thus, we wish to honor the late Nelson Mandela as the inspiring beacon for peace and prosperity in Africa and link his name with a unique and precious expression of Kenya's and Africa's endemic fauna. We propose the common name "Mandela's sengi" in English ("sengi ya Mandela" in Kiswahili) for this new form"			
Rissoella dalii Ortea, Espinosa & Magaña, 2004	Sea snail	Salvador Dalí	"Named in homage to the brilliant painter Salvador Dalí, on the centenary of his birth. Dalí frequently incorporated snails in his works, from the individual Seashell (1928) to The Path to Enigma (1981), including the drawings of land snails in 50 Magic Secrets to Paint (1947) and Dalí illustrious Casanova (1967), with special mention of The Madonna of Port Lligat (1949 and 1950)."			
Roddenberryus Sánchez-Ruiz & Bonaldo, 2023	Spider	Gene Roddenberry	A genus of caponiid spiders named "honoring Eugene Wesley Roddenberry Sr, the creator of Star Trek, a science fiction media franchise that inspired generations of kids to pursue scientific careers."			
Rostropria garbo Early & Naumann, 1990	Wasp	Greta Garbo	A Diapriid wasp described as "a solitary female".			
Rotaovula hirohitoi Cate & Azuma, 1973	Sea snail	Hirohito	"The name of this new species honors His Majesty, Emperor Hirohito of Japan, who is an ardent patron of malacology."			
Rothaeina jamesi Bennett, 2023	Spider	Elmore James	"honouring the late Elmore James who set the standards for electric slide guitar blues in post-World War II Chicago, U.S.A."			
Rothaeina mackinleyi Bennett, 2023	Spider	Muddy Waters	"honouring the late blues guitarist, lyricist, and band leader McKinley "Muddy Waters" Morganfield."			
Salinoctomys loschalchalerosorum Mares, Braun, Barquez & Diaz, 2000	Rodent	Los Chalchaleros	The researcher in charge of the naming stated that he named the new species after Los Chalchaleros because his crews had sung their songs during thirty years of field research across Argentina. Subsequently transferred to genus Tympanoctomys.			
Schismatothele benedettii Panzera, Perdomo & Pérez-Miles, 2011	Spider	Mario Benedetti	A Brazilian tarantula named "in honour of Mario Benedetti, the Uruguayan writer and poet recognised as one of the most important in the Spanish language, who passed away in 2009."			
Schistura kaysonei Vidthayanon & Jaruthanin, 2002	Fish	Kaysone Phomvihane	A blind cave loach endemic to Laos.			
Schistura pridii Vidthayanon, 2003	Fish	Pridi Banomyong	A blind cave loach endemic to Thailand, named "in honor of the late Pridi Bhanomyong (1900–1983), politician, statesman and Thai Prime Minister who founded Thammasart University, which plays an important role in the development of social sciences in Thailand."			
Scytodes mingusi Iost, Alayón & Rheims, 2025	Spider	Charles Mingus	"The specific name is a patronym honoring the late American jazz bassist and composer Charles Mingus (22 April 1922 – 5 January 1979), known for his innovative contributions to modern jazz, blending elements of gospel, classical, and free jazz, and for his role as a bandleader and advocate for creative expression."			
Scytodes reinhardti Iost, Alayón & Rheims, 2025	Spider	Django Reinhardt	"The specific name is a patronym honoring the late Belgian Manouche guitarist Django Reinhardt (23 January 1910 – 16 May 1953), a pioneering jazz musician known for developing the gypsy jazz style and for his influential guitar technique despite a hand injury that limited his mobility."			
Seitaad ruessi † Sertich & Loewen, 2010	Dinosaur	Everett Ruess	A sauropodomorph from the Jurassic of southern Utah, named "In honor of the young artist, poet, naturalist, and explorer Everett Ruess (1914–1934?), who mysteriously disappeared in 1934 while exploring southern Utah."			
Senoniasphaera clavelli † Bailey, Milner & Varney, 1997	Protist	James Clavell	A fossil dinoflagellate cyst from the Jurassic Coast of Dorset, England, named "After local celebrity James Clavell, in whose memory an obelisk is built on top of Hen Cliff." (the type locality)			
Serendipaceratops arthurcclarkei † Rich & Vickers-Rich, 2003	Dinosaur	Arthur C. Clarke	"Named in honour of Sir Arthur C. Clarke, who inspired both of us in our youth with his writings and who in his youth was lured into science by dinosaurs." Clarke, who was a personal friend of the authors, reportedly told friends "I've had an asteroid named after me and I've had a dinosaur named after me, now what's there to live for?"			
Sharpia madibai Haran, 2021	Weevil	Nelson Mandela	A species found in South Africa and Namibia, "dedicated to Nelson Mandela 'Madiba' for the role he played in the history of the Republic of South Africa."			
Showajidaia Korshunova et al., 2020	Sea slug	Hirohito	"From the Japanese Shōwa jidai (昭和時代) meaning 'Shōwa era' corresponding to the reign of the Shōwa Emperor Hirohito in reference to the collection of the type material for the type species of this genus C. sagamiensis by Hirohito."			
Showapolynoe Imajima, 1997	Polychaete worm	Hirohito	"The genus is named after the late Emperor Showa [Hirohito's posthumous name] who investigated the benthic fauna of Sagami Bay."			
Showascalisetosus Imajima, 1997	Polychaete worm	Hirohito	"The genus is named after the late Emperor Showa [Hirohito's posthumous name] who collected the specimens."			
Sinatra Buffington, 2011	Wasp	Frank Sinatra				
Singafrotypa mandela Kuntner & Hormiga, 2002	Spider	Nelson Mandela	This South African species "is named after Nelson Mandela in honor of his struggle against Apartheid."			
Sminthurides fridakahloae Ferreira, Arango & Palacios-Vargas, 2021	Springtail	Frida Kahlo	This species is native to Mexico.			
Souvanna phoumai Breuning, 1963	Beetle	Souvanna Phouma	This species was described from specimens collected in Laos; The genus and species names were created concurrently to honor the Laotian Prime Minister in office at the time. Subsequently, this species was synonymised with Mispila signata (Pic, 1926), which was transferred to the still valid genus Souvanna, and therefore renamed as Souvanna signata (Pic, 1926).			
Spelaeornis troglodytoides indiraji Ripley et al., 1991	Bird	Indira Gandhi	"dedicated to the memory of our beloved friend and foremost member of the Delhi Birdwatching Society, the late Prime Minister of India, Smt. Indira Gandhi."			
Spermophora gordimerae Huber, 2003	Spider	Nadine Gordimer	A cellar spider from South Africa, "Named after Nadine Gordimer, South African writer and Nobel laureate."			
Spermophora pembai Huber, 2003	Spider	George Pemba	A cellar spider from South Africa, "Named after George Milwa Mnyaluza Pemba (1912–2001), one of South Africa's greatest pioneering artists."			
Stactobiella solzhenitsyni Sykora & Weaver, 1978	Caddisfly	Aleksandr Solzhenitsyn	"I take much pleasure in naming this species for Mr. Aleksander I. Solzhenitsyn, the great Russian author, who once shared the same country with the closest relative of the new species—Stactobiella biramosa Martynov."; Subsequently synonymised with Stactobiella martynovi.			
Stanhopea saintexuperyi Archila, Pérez-García, Chiron & Szlach.	Orchid	Antoine de Saint-Exupéry				
Stasimopus mandelai Hendrixson & Bond, 2004	Spider	Nelson Mandela	"honoring Nelson Mandela, the former president of South Africa and one of the great moral leaders of our time." This species is known only from the Great Fish River Nature Reserve in South Africa.			
Steinbeckomyces Crous & Jurjević (2024)	Fungus	John Steinbeck	"Named for John Ernst Steinbeck, an American author, who won the 1962 Nobel Prize in Literature, and who wrote a novel titled Tortilla Flat (1935), the location where this fungus was collected."			
Stenotarsus monterrosoi Arriaga-Varela et al., 2013	Beetle	Augusto Monterroso	"This small–sized species from Guatemala is dedicated to the late Guatemalan author Augusto Monterroso, who mastered the art of short narrative."			
Stenotarsus rulfoi Arriaga-Varela et al., 2013	Beetle	Juan Rulfo	"This species is dedicated to the prominent Mexican writer Juan Rulfo, who lived his youth at San Gabriel town, 20 kilometers away from the type locality."			
Sternolophus mandelai Nasserzadeh & Komarek, 2017	Beetle	Nelson Mandela	"Named in honor of the great philanthropist, anti-apartheid revolutionary leader and politician Nelson Mandela from South Africa who died on 5 December 2013. Preparing the description was coincident with the national mourning period of his death."			
Sulawesidrobia soedjatmokoi Zielske, Glaubrecht & Haase, 2011	Freshwater snail	Soedjatmoko	"named after Soedjatmoko Mangundiningrat, an Indonesian peace activist and honoree of the Ramon Magsaysay Award, the prestigious Asian equivalent of the Nobel Peace Prize."			
Synagelides wyszynskii Bohdanowicz, 1987	Spider	Stefan Wyszyński	Subsequently synonymised with Synagelides martensi.			
Synopeas saintexuperyi Buhl, 1997	Wasp	Antoine de Saint-Exupéry				
Tabanus rockefelleri Philip, 1954	Fly	David Rockefeller	This horsefly species was described from specimens collected by the David Rockefeller Mexican Expedition of the American Museum of Natural History.			
Taophila hackae Platania & Gómez-Zurita, 2021	Beetle	Margherita Hack	"This species is named after the Italian Astrophysicist and scientific disseminator Margherita Hack (Florence, 1922-Trieste 2013). Besides her brilliant scientific carrier, as full professor of astronomy in the University of Trieste, she was also known for her activities in social and political fields, described as icona del pensiero libero e dell'anticonformismo (symbol of freethinking and nonconformism) by the prestigious Italian politician and activist Umberto Veronesi."			
Tasmanocaecilius truchanasi Schmidt & New, 2008	Barklouse	Olegas Truchanas	This species is endemic to Tasmania, where Truchanas was a conservation campaigner and nature photographer.			
Tellina (Merisca) steinbecki Coan & Valentich-Scott, 2010	Bivalve	John Steinbeck	This species was described from specimens collected in the Gulf of California and "named after John Steinbeck, noted American author who explored the Gulf of California with Ed Ricketts." (another species was named after marine biologist Ricketts in the same paper). Subsequently transferred to genus Serratina.			
Temnothorax elmenshawyi Sharaf, Wachkoo & Hita Garcia, 2019	Ant	Muhammad Saddiq Al-Minshawi				
Teresirogas nolani Quicke & Butcher, 2014	Wasp	Sidney Nolan	An Australian parasitoid wasp "Named after the famed Australian artist, Sidney Robert Nolan (1917–1972) well known for his Ned Kelly series of paintings."			
Thalassema steinbecki Fisher, 1946	Polychaete worm	John Steinbeck	"Named for John Steinbeck, whose expedition to the Gulf of California collected the type."			
Thelepus mandelai Lavesque & Hutchings, 2026	Polychaete worm	Nelson Mandela	This species is native to the coasts of South Africa.			
Thraulodes luizgonzagai Lima, Mariano & Pinheiro, 2013	Mayfly	Luiz Gonzaga	"a tribute to Luiz Gonzaga, famous singer from the state of Pernambuco, who sang beautiful songs about the semi-arid region of Pernambuco, collection site of the new species."			
Tianchisaurus nedegoapeferima † Dong, 1993	Dinosaur	Sam Neill, Laura Dern, Jeff Goldblum, Richard Attenborough, Bob Peck, Martin Ferrero, Ariana Richards, and Joseph Mazzello	Actors involved in the 1993 film Jurassic Park: Neill, Dern, Goldblum, Attenborough, Peck, Ferrero, Richards, and Mazzello. The type specimen was informally referred to as "Jurassosaurus". The species name was proposed by director Steven Spielberg.			
Tmesiphantes amadoi Yamamoto et al., 2007	Spider	Jorge Amado	A tarantula native to the Brazilian state of Bahia, where Jorge Amado was born.			
Tmesiphantes caymmii Yamamoto et al., 2007	Spider	Dorival Caymmi	A tarantula native to the Brazilian state of Bahia, where Dorival Caymmi was born.			
Travisia amadoi Elías et al., 2003	Polychaete worm	Jorge Amado	A marine worm native to the Atlantic coasts of Argentina and Southern Brazil.			
Triacanthella madiba Janion, D'Haese & Deharveng, 2012	Springtail	Nelson Mandela	This species is native to South Africa; "We dedicate this species to Madiba, former President of South Africa, Nelson Rolihlahla Mandela, who celebrated his 20 years of freedom on 11 February 2010."			
Trichogramma nerudai Pintureau & Gerding, 1999	Wasp	Pablo Neruda	This species is native to Chile.			
Trichomycterus dali Rizzato, Costa, Trajano & Bichuette, 2011	Catfish	Salvador Dalí	"an allusion to the Spanish artist Salvador Dali, in reference to his famously long moustache (or whisker)."			
Triplocania nerudai González-Obando, Carrejo-Gironza & García Aldrete, 2021	Barklouse	Pablo Neruda				
Triraphis cortazari Valerio, 2015	Wasp	Julio Cortázar				
Tristania razakiana Kochummen	Flowering plant	Abdul Razak Hussein	This species is endemic to Peninsular Malaysia and was named "in honour of Tun Haji Abdul Razak bin Datuk Hussein, Prime Minister of Malaysia, to commemorate his visit to the Forest Research Institute, Kepong on 21st July, 1973."; Subsequently transferred to genus Tristaniopsis.			
Tsitsikamma (Clavicaulis) madiba Samaai, Kelly, Payne & Ngwakum 2020	Sponge	Nelson Mandela	A Poecilosclerid sponge from the coasts of South Africa, "Named in honour of the great South African president Nelson Rolihlahla Mandela, also known by his clan name "Madiba", liberation struggle hero and Nobel Peace Prize laureate, who passed away on 5 December 2013 at the age of 95."			
Ummidia waunekaae Godwin & Bond, 2021	Spider	Annie Dodge Wauneka	A trapdoor spider from New Mexico, named "in honor of Annie Dodge Wauneka (1910–1997), influential member of the Navajo Nation who worked tirelessly to improve education and health of the Navajo. Among other awards, she was bestowed the United States Presidential Medal of Freedom in 1963 by President Lyndon B. Johnson."			
Vaimosa rambaiae H.M. Smith, 1945	Fish	Rambai Barni	"Special permission to use her name for this species was obtained from Her Majesty Rambai Barni, former Queen of Siam, and at a reception and exhibit given by the Siam Society in honor of their majesties on January 8, 1934, a water-color painting, made by the talented Thai artist Luang Masya Chitrakarn, was presented to her majesty. The painting represented several life-size examples of the fish in their natural habitat." Subsequently transferred to genus Mugilogobius.			
Volvarina (Mirpurina) blezai Ortea, 2019	Sea snail	Francisco Xavier da Cruz	A margin shell from Cape Verde, "Named in honour of Francisco Xavier da Cruz (1905–1958), native of São Vicente and immortalised as B. Leza, musician, composer, performer, writer, researcher, pedagogue and poet. Author of the poem "Mar Azul", our common home, and master of the cadenced rhythm we know today as Morna, the hallmark of Cape Verdean music". Immediately after the formal description, within the same paper, subgenus Mirpurina was elevated to genus status.			
Volvarina dulcemariae Espinosa & Ortea, 1998	Sea snail	Dulce María Loynaz	A margin shell from Cuba, "named in honour of the late Cuban poet Dulce María Loynaz [...] and in gratitude for her contribution to the book Fábulas del Mar [Fables of the Sea, a children's book sponsored by the second author, which Loynaz wrote the prologue for]."			
Volvarina saramagoi Espinosa, Ortea & Moro, 2013	Sea snail	José Saramago	"in honour of José de Sousa Saramago, illustrious Portuguese writer and poet, winner of the 1998 Nobel Prize for Literature, who chose Lanzarote [where the holotype was collected] as his refuge and residence at the end of his life; he died on 18.6.2010 in Tías."			
Vulcanobatrachus mandelai † Trueb, Ross & Smith, 2005	Frog	Nelson Mandela	A fossil species from the Cretaceous of Marydale, South Africa.			
Warimiri madiba Tavares, de Mello & de Mello Mendes, 2021	Katydid	Nelson Mandela	"The name is an hommage of the authors to South Africa's ex-president, Nobel Prize of Peace winner, human rights activist, and the most acknowledged Subsaharian African leader, Nelson Rolihlahla Mandela (July 18, 1918 – December 5, 2013). Madiba is the name of Mandela's clan and how he is known in many South African ethnicities."			
Whartonia glenni Brennan, 1962	Mite	John Glenn	One of four species of chiggers named concurrently after the cosmonauts and astronauts who participated in the first four crewed orbital spaceflights in 1961 and 1962 (see also List of organisms named after famous people (born 1925–1949)). "Named for Lt. Col. John H. Glenn Jr., USA, who made three orbits of the earth in Friendship II [sic; the name was actually Friendship 7], 20 February 1962."			
Zanclea hirohitoi Boero, Bouillon & Gravili, 2000	Jellyfish	Hirohito	"This species is dedicated to the late Hirohito, Emperor of Japan, distinguished hydrozoan taxonomist, who first described material referable to this species."			
Zaprionus aungsani Wynn & Toda, 1988	Fly	Aung San	A fruit fly from Myanmar, "dedicated to the late general Aung San, the national leader of Burma."			

== See also ==
- List of bacterial genera named after personal names
- List of rose cultivars named after people
- List of taxa named by anagrams
- List of organisms named after the Harry Potter series
