= Sinatra (disambiguation) =

Frank Sinatra (1915–1998) was an American singer, actor, and producer.

Sinatra is an Italian surname, mainly present in Sicily. It may also refer to:

== People ==
=== Frank Sinatra's relatives ===
- Anthony Martin Sinatra (1892–1969), fireman, boxer, and Frank's father
- Barbara Sinatra (1926–2017), Frank's fourth wife
- Frank Sinatra Jr. (1944–2016), American singer and conductor; Frank's only son
- Nancy Sinatra (born 1940), American singer and actress; Frank's daughter
- Ray Sinatra (1904–1980), conductor, Frank's second cousin
- Tina Sinatra (born 1948), American film producer and former actress; Frank's daughter

=== Others ===
- Stephen Sinatra (1946–2022), American physician
- Vincenzo Sinatra (1720–1765), 18th-century Sicilian architect from Noto
- Sinatraa (born 2000), American esports player
- Richard Wheatley, né Sinatra, fictional antagonist of Law & Order: Organized Crime

== Arts, entertainment, and media ==
=== Music ===
- Trashcan Sinatras, a Scottish band that began in 1987
- "Sinatra", a song by Helmet from their album Strap It On (1990)
- "Frank Sinatra", a song by Cake from their album Fashion Nugget (1996)
- "Frank Sinatra" (Miss Kittin & The Hacker song), a 2000 song
- "Frankie Sinatra" (2016), a song by the Avalanches
- "Sinatra", a song by the Fire Theft from their self-titled album

=== Theatre ===
- Sinatra: The Musical, a 2023 biographical jukebox musical

=== Television ===
- Sinatra (miniseries) a 1992 television miniseries
- Sinatra (TV program), a 1969 television special
- Frank Sinatra: A Man and His Music, a 1966 television special

=== Film ===
- "Sinatra" (1988), a Spanish movie directed by Francesc Betriu, starring Alfredo Landa, based on:
  - "Sinatra", a 1984 novel by Raúl Nuñez

=== Literature ===
- Sinatra: The Life, 2005 non-fiction book by Anthony Summers and Robbyn Swan

== Other uses ==
- Sinatra (software), a web application framework written in Ruby
- Frank Sinatra School of the Arts, a high school in New York City, US
- "Sinatra Doctrine", the Soviet government's policy of allowing neighboring nations to determine their own internal affairs
- Sinatra (wasp), a genus of wasps in the family Figitidae
