= Acmaeoderopsis guttifera =

Scientific classification
- Domain: Eukaryota
- Kingdom: Animalia
- Phylum: Arthropoda
- Class: Insecta
- Order: Coleoptera
- Suborder: Polyphaga
- Infraorder: Elateriformia
- Family: Buprestidae
- Genus: Acmaeoderopsis
- Species: A. guttifera

Binomial name
- Acmaeoderopsis guttifera (LeConte, 1859)

Synonyms
- Acmaeoderopsis versuta (Horn, 1878)

Species of beetle

Acmaeoderopsis guttifera is a species of metallic wood-boring beetle in the family Buprestidae. It is found in Central America and North America.
