= Acmaeoderopsis jaguarina =

Scientific classification
- Kingdom: Animalia
- Phylum: Arthropoda
- Clade: Pancrustacea
- Class: Insecta
- Order: Coleoptera
- Suborder: Polyphaga
- Infraorder: Elateriformia
- Family: Buprestidae
- Genus: Acmaeoderopsis
- Species: A. jaguarina

Binomial name
- Acmaeoderopsis jaguarina (Knull, 1938)

Species of beetle

Acmaeoderopsis jaguarina is a species of metallic wood-boring beetle in the family Buprestidae.
