= Hyboserica uhligi =

Scientific classification
- Kingdom: Animalia
- Phylum: Arthropoda
- Class: Insecta
- Order: Coleoptera
- Suborder: Polyphaga
- Infraorder: Scarabaeiformia
- Family: Scarabaeidae
- Genus: Hyboserica
- Species: H. uhligi

Binomial name
- Hyboserica uhligi Fabrizi, Eberle & Ahrens, 2019

Species of beetle

Hyboserica uhligi is a species of beetle of the family Scarabaeidae. It is found in Zimbabwe.

== Description ==
Adults reach a length of about 8–10 mm.

== Etymology ==
The species is named after its collector, M. Uhlig.
