= Acmaeoderopsis westcotti =

Scientific classification
- Kingdom: Animalia
- Phylum: Arthropoda
- Clade: Pancrustacea
- Class: Insecta
- Order: Coleoptera
- Suborder: Polyphaga
- Infraorder: Elateriformia
- Family: Buprestidae
- Genus: Acmaeoderopsis
- Species: A. westcotti

Binomial name
- Acmaeoderopsis westcotti (Barr, 1972)

Species of beetle

Acmaeoderopsis westcotti is a species of metallic wood-boring beetle in the family Buprestidae.
