= Nerudia =

Scientific classification
- Kingdom: Animalia
- Phylum: Arthropoda
- Subphylum: Chelicerata
- Class: Arachnida
- Order: Araneae
- Infraorder: Araneomorphae
- Family: Pholcidae
- Genus: Nerudia; Huber, 2000

Type species
- Nerudia atacama Huber, 2000

Species
- 11, see text

Genus of spiders

Nerudia is a genus of South American cellar spiders. It was first described by B. A. Huber in 2000, and named in honour of Chilean poet Pablo Neruda. It is only found in Argentina and Chile.

== Species ==
As of May 2023 it contains eleven species:

- Nerudia atacama Huber, 2000 (type) — Chile
- Nerudia centaura Huber, 2023 — Argentina
- Nerudia colina Huber, 2023 — Argentina
- Nerudia flecha Huber, 2023 — Chile
- Nerudia guirnalda Huber, 2023 — Argentina
- Nerudia hoguera Huber, 2023 — Argentina
- Nerudia nono Huber, 2023 — Argentina
- Nerudia ola Huber, 2023 — Argentina
- Nerudia poma Huber, 2023 — Argentina
- Nerudia rocio Huber, 2023 — Argentina
- Nerudia trigo Huber, 2023 — Argentina

== See also ==
- List of Pholcidae species
- List of organisms named after famous people (born 1900–1924)
