= Acmaeoderopsis junki =

Scientific classification
- Domain: Eukaryota
- Kingdom: Animalia
- Phylum: Arthropoda
- Class: Insecta
- Order: Coleoptera
- Suborder: Polyphaga
- Infraorder: Elateriformia
- Family: Buprestidae
- Genus: Acmaeoderopsis
- Species: A. junki

Binomial name
- Acmaeoderopsis junki (Théry, 1929)

Species of beetle

Acmaeoderopsis junki is a species of metallic wood-boring beetle in the family Buprestidae. It is found in Central America and North America.

== Subspecies ==
These two subspecies belong to the species Acmaeoderopsis junki:

- Acmaeoderopsis junki junki
- Acmaeoderopsis junki peninsularis (Barr, 1972)
