= Hyboserica =

Scientific classification
- Kingdom: Animalia
- Phylum: Arthropoda
- Clade: Pancrustacea
- Class: Insecta
- Order: Coleoptera
- Suborder: Polyphaga
- Infraorder: Scarabaeiformia
- Family: Scarabaeidae
- Subfamily: Sericinae
- Tribe: Sericini
- Genus: Hyboserica; Péringuey, 1904

Genus of leaf beetles

Hyboserica is a genus of beetles belonging to the family Scarabaeidae.

== Species ==
- Hyboserica alexandriana Fabrizi, Eberle & Ahrens, 2019
- Hyboserica asymmetrica Fabrizi, Eberle & Ahrens, 2019
- Hyboserica bednariki Fabrizi, Eberle & Ahrens, 2019
- Hyboserica caffra (Fåhraeus, 1857)
- Hyboserica davisorum Fabrizi, Eberle & Ahrens, 2019
- Hyboserica dukuduku Fabrizi, Eberle & Ahrens, 2019
- Hyboserica entabeniensis Fabrizi, Eberle & Ahrens, 2019
- Hyboserica grootkloofensis Fabrizi, Eberle & Ahrens, 2019
- Hyboserica haladai Fabrizi, Eberle & Ahrens, 2019
- Hyboserica kochi Fabrizi, Eberle & Ahrens, 2019
- Hyboserica kosiensis Fabrizi, Eberle & Ahrens, 2019
- Hyboserica madiba Fabrizi, Eberle & Ahrens, 2019
- Hyboserica makutsiensis Fabrizi, Eberle & Ahrens, 2019
- Hyboserica maphelaneensis Fabrizi, Eberle & Ahrens, 2019
- Hyboserica marieskopensis Fabrizi, Eberle & Ahrens, 2019
- Hyboserica muellerae Fabrizi, Eberle & Ahrens, 2019
- Hyboserica nelspruitensis Fabrizi, Eberle & Ahrens, 2019
- Hyboserica ongoyeensis Fabrizi, Eberle & Ahrens, 2019
- Hyboserica schoenhoferi Fabrizi, Eberle & Ahrens, 2019
- Hyboserica sebastiani Fabrizi, Eberle & Ahrens, 2019
- Hyboserica sergeji Fabrizi, Eberle & Ahrens, 2019
- Hyboserica shilouvaneensis Fabrizi, Eberle & Ahrens, 2019
- Hyboserica shulmani Fabrizi, Eberle & Ahrens, 2019
- Hyboserica sipeki Fabrizi, Eberle & Ahrens, 2019
- Hyboserica sodwanensis Fabrizi, Eberle & Ahrens, 2019
- Hyboserica soutpansbergensis Fabrizi, Eberle & Ahrens, 2019
- Hyboserica uhligi Fabrizi, Eberle & Ahrens, 2019
- Hyboserica uitsoekensis Fabrizi, Eberle & Ahrens, 2019
- Hyboserica umgeniensis Fabrizi, Eberle & Ahrens, 2019
- Hyboserica vogti Fabrizi, Eberle & Ahrens, 2019
