= Hyboserica shulmani =

Scientific classification
- Kingdom: Animalia
- Phylum: Arthropoda
- Class: Insecta
- Order: Coleoptera
- Suborder: Polyphaga
- Infraorder: Scarabaeiformia
- Family: Scarabaeidae
- Genus: Hyboserica
- Species: H. shulmani

Binomial name
- Hyboserica shulmani Fabrizi, Eberle & Ahrens, 2019

Species of beetle

Hyboserica shulmani is a species of beetle of the family Scarabaeidae. It is found in South Africa (KwaZulu-Natal, Mpumalanga).

== Description ==
Adults reach a length of about 8.4–9.8 mm.

== Etymology ==
The species is named after the collector of the type specimen, B. Shulman.
