= Hyboserica bednariki =

Scientific classification
- Kingdom: Animalia
- Phylum: Arthropoda
- Class: Insecta
- Order: Coleoptera
- Suborder: Polyphaga
- Infraorder: Scarabaeiformia
- Family: Scarabaeidae
- Genus: Hyboserica
- Species: H. bednariki

Binomial name
- Hyboserica bednariki Fabrizi, Eberle & Ahrens, 2019

Species of beetle

Hyboserica bednariki is a species of beetle of the family Scarabaeidae. It is found in South Africa (KwaZulu-Natal).

== Description ==
Adults reach a length of about 9.58 mm.

== Etymology ==
The species is named after its collector, M. Bednařik.
