= Hyboserica caffra =

Scientific classification
- Kingdom: Animalia
- Phylum: Arthropoda
- Class: Insecta
- Order: Coleoptera
- Suborder: Polyphaga
- Infraorder: Scarabaeiformia
- Family: Scarabaeidae
- Genus: Hyboserica
- Species: H. caffra

Binomial name
- Hyboserica caffra (Fåhreus, 1857)

Synonyms
- Triodonta caffra Fåhreus, 1857

Species of beetle

Hyboserica caffra is a species of beetle of the family Scarabaeidae. It is found in South Africa (Limpopo, KwaZulu-Natal).

== Description ==
Adults reach a length of about 9.23 mm.
