= Hyboserica marieskopensis =

Scientific classification
- Kingdom: Animalia
- Phylum: Arthropoda
- Class: Insecta
- Order: Coleoptera
- Suborder: Polyphaga
- Infraorder: Scarabaeiformia
- Family: Scarabaeidae
- Genus: Hyboserica
- Species: H. marieskopensis

Binomial name
- Hyboserica marieskopensis Fabrizi, Eberle & Ahrens, 2019

Species of beetle

Hyboserica marieskopensis is a species of beetle of the family Scarabaeidae. It is found in South Africa (Mpumalanga).

== Description ==
Adults reach a length of about 9.6–9.8 mm.

== Etymology ==
The species is named after its type locality, Marieskop Forest.
