= Acmaeoderopsis chisosensis =

Scientific classification
- Domain: Eukaryota
- Kingdom: Animalia
- Phylum: Arthropoda
- Class: Insecta
- Order: Coleoptera
- Suborder: Polyphaga
- Infraorder: Elateriformia
- Family: Buprestidae
- Genus: Acmaeoderopsis
- Species: A. chisosensis

Binomial name
- Acmaeoderopsis chisosensis (Knull, 1952)

Species of beetle

Acmaeoderopsis chisosensis is a species of metallic wood-boring beetle in the family Buprestidae. It is found in Central America and North America.
