= Souvanna =

Scientific classification
- Kingdom: Animalia
- Phylum: Arthropoda
- Class: Insecta
- Order: Coleoptera
- Suborder: Polyphaga
- Infraorder: Cucujiformia
- Family: Cerambycidae
- Genus: Souvanna; Breuning, 1963
- Species: S. signata

Binomial name
- Souvanna signata (Pic, 1926)

Synonyms
- Alidus signatus Pic, 1926; Mispila (Mispila) signata Breuning, 1961; Enispia quadristigma Gressitt, 1940; Athylia quadristigma Breuning, 1960; Souvanna phoumai Breuning, 1963; Mispila (Dryusa) coomani Breuning, 1968

Species of beetle

Souvanna is a monotypic genus of beetle in the family Cerambycidae. Its sole species, Souvanna signata, is known from China, Laos, Thailand, and Vietnam.
