= Stephen Sinatra =

American physician (1946–2022)

Stephen T. Sinatra (15 October 1946 –19 June 2022) was a board-certified cardiologist specializing in integrative medicine. He was also a certified bioenergetic psychotherapist. He has published journal articles on cholesterol and coenzyme Q_{10}. He has appeared on national radio and television broadcasts, including The Dr. Oz Show, The Doctors, CNN's "Sunday Morning News," XM Radio's "America's Doctor Dr. Mehmet Oz," and PBS's "Body & Soul." He was also the author of the monthly newsletter Heart, Health & Nutrition and founder of Heart MD Institute. Sinatra died on June 19, 2022 after a brief bout of pancreatic cancer.

== Training and practice ==
Sinatra graduated from New York's Albany Medical College with an MD in 1972, and earned his certification in internal medicine from the American Board of Internal Medicine in 1975. He was board-certified by the American College of Cardiology and was a fellow of the American College of Cardiology since 1977. He had certifications from the Massachusetts Society for Bioenergetic Analysis (1992) and the Certification Board for Nutrition Specialists (2000). He had certification from the American Board of Anti-Aging Medicine (1998), which is not recognized by the American Board of Medical Specialties or the American Medical Association. American physicians cannot be officially board-certified in anti-aging medicine. He was a fellow of the American College of Nutrition.

Having studied coenzyme Q_{10} in the prevention and treatment of heart disease, Sinatra had written on the subject. His experience with CoQ_{10} led him to develop a new branch of cardiology in the United States: "metabolic cardiology." Metabolic cardiology involves preventing and treating cardiovascular disease at the cellular level with nutraceuticals which improve ATP production in heart cells. Sinatra lectured about metabolic cardiology and energy medicine, focusing on the use of electroceuticals such as grounding or "earthing" to improve the body's capacity to heal at the cellular level.

== Medical philosophy ==
In his books, newsletter, and interviews, Sinatra advocated treatment approaches that combine conventional medical therapies with nutritional and mind-body therapies that he thought enhance the body's natural bioenergetics and heal the heart. He promoted his ideas of five specific pillars of cardiac health:

1. an anti-inflammatory diet rich in fresh fruit and vegetables, whole grains, fish, nuts, and healthy oils, similar to the Mediterranean diet [Sinatra also developed an anti-inflammatory, low-glycemic nutrition plan called the Pan-Asian / Modified Mediterranean (PAMM) Diet];
2. nutritional supplementation that includes a high-potency multi-nutrient, fish oil, magnesium, vitamin C, and coenzyme Q_{10};
3. regular exercise;
4. detoxification; and
5. stress reduction.

Sinatra believed in the impact one's emotions have on overall health and the need to resolve so called emotional blockages as well as physical ones. He stated that "whenever you confront a person with an illness, you have to involve everything, including the spiritual.… Every illness has a psychological and a physical component." He pointed to such interconnectedness in the relationship between unexpressed negative emotions—anger and sadness, for example—and the development of high blood pressure and heart disease. Sinatra also believed that heart disease manifests differently in women than in men, and that such differences ultimately affect diagnosis and treatment of heart disease in women.

Sinatra presented his ideas about "metabolic cardiology" at the American College for Advancement in Medicine's 2005 Conference on Scientific Integrative Medicine. His proposed treatments included giving patients supplemental doses of substances that occur naturally in the body which he believed enhance metabolic reactions in cells. Sinatra believed coenzyme Q_{10}, D-ribose, and L-carnitine are important in this proposed process because of the roles they play in the production and use of adenosine triphosphate (ATP), the body's basic cellular fuel. In this context, he called coenzyme Q_{10} a "wonder nutrient," especially for women, as he believed it helps the heart pump more effectively. His ACAM presentation also suggested that low levels of coenzyQ_{10} may result in the development of heart disease.

Sinatra was often critical of what he saw as an over-emphasis on cholesterol as an independent risk factor for heart disease and of what he considered the over-prescription of statin drugs. Most statin drugs, which block an enzyme pathway necessary for the body to produce cholesterol, also block the enzyme pathway by which the body naturally produces coenzyme Q_{10}. Sinatra acknowledged that these drugs accomplish their goal of reducing cholesterol, but maintained that they also deprive the heart and other muscles of a vital nutrient and thereby set the stage for potential heart failure.

Sinatra was also critical of refined sugar, which he called "public enemy number one when it comes to heart disease, not cholesterol." He believed the surges of insulin that occur when too much sugar is consumed create a "yo-yo effect" that, over time, damages the inner lining of the blood vessels. He also believed that sugar is linked to the proliferation of cancer cells.

== "Grounding" ==
Sinatra advocated a controversial alternative health practice called "grounding" or "earthing." According to the theory of grounding, the earth's surface is negatively charged and contact with the earth allows electrons to neutralize free radicals in the human body. One study, published in a fringe journal, attempted to show a reduction in blood viscosity and blood pressure, a key factor in cardiovascular disease, but has been highly questioned due to improper methods and questionable results. Advocates say this can be accomplished by lying or walking barefoot on grass, sand or earth, or by lying on a special pad connected to the earth by grounding wires or a rod, or plugged into a wall outlet with a "modern earth ground system". A peer-reviewed research article from Journal of Inflammation Research shows such earthing practice to be a "simple, natural, and accessible health strategy against chronic inflammation, warranting the serious attention of clinicians and researchers".

== Books and publications ==
Sinatra was the author of the monthly newsletter Heart, Health & Nutrition (ISSN 1554-2467), and has written or contributed to the following books:

- The Great Cholesterol Myth (Fair Winds Press, 2012)
- Earthing - the most important health discovery ever? (Basic Health, 2010)
- Bottom Line's The Healing Kitchen (Bottom Line, 2010)
- The Sinatra Solution: Metabolic Cardiology (Basic Health, 2005, 2008, 2011)
- Sugar Shock! How Sweets and Simple Carbs Can Derail Your Life—And How You Can Get Back on Track (Berkley Trade, 2006)
- Reverse Heart Disease Now: Stop Deadly Cardiovascular Plaque Before It's Too Late (Wiley, 2006)
- The Fast Food Diet: Lose Weight and Feel Great Even If You're Too Busy to Eat Right (Wiley, 2006)
- Spa Medicine: Your Gateway to the Ageless Zone (Basic Health, 2004)
- Lower Your Blood Pressure in Eight Weeks (Ballantine, 2003)
- Heart Sense for Women (Plume, 2001)
- Tocotrienols and Vitamin E (Keats, 2000)
- Heartbreak & Heart Disease: A Mind/Body Prescription for Healing the Heart (IBS Books, 1999)
- Optimum Health: A Natural Lifesaving Prescription for Your Body and Mind (Bantam, 1998)
- L-Carnitine and the Heart (McGraw-Hill, 1999)
- Coenzyme Q_{10} and the Heart (McGraw-Hill, 1999)
- The Coenzyme Q_{10} Phenomenon (McGraw-Hill, 1999)
- Lose to Win: A Cardiologist's Guide to Weight Loss and Nutritional Healing (Lincoln Bradley Publishing, 1992) 20:03, 31 August 2010 (UTC)
