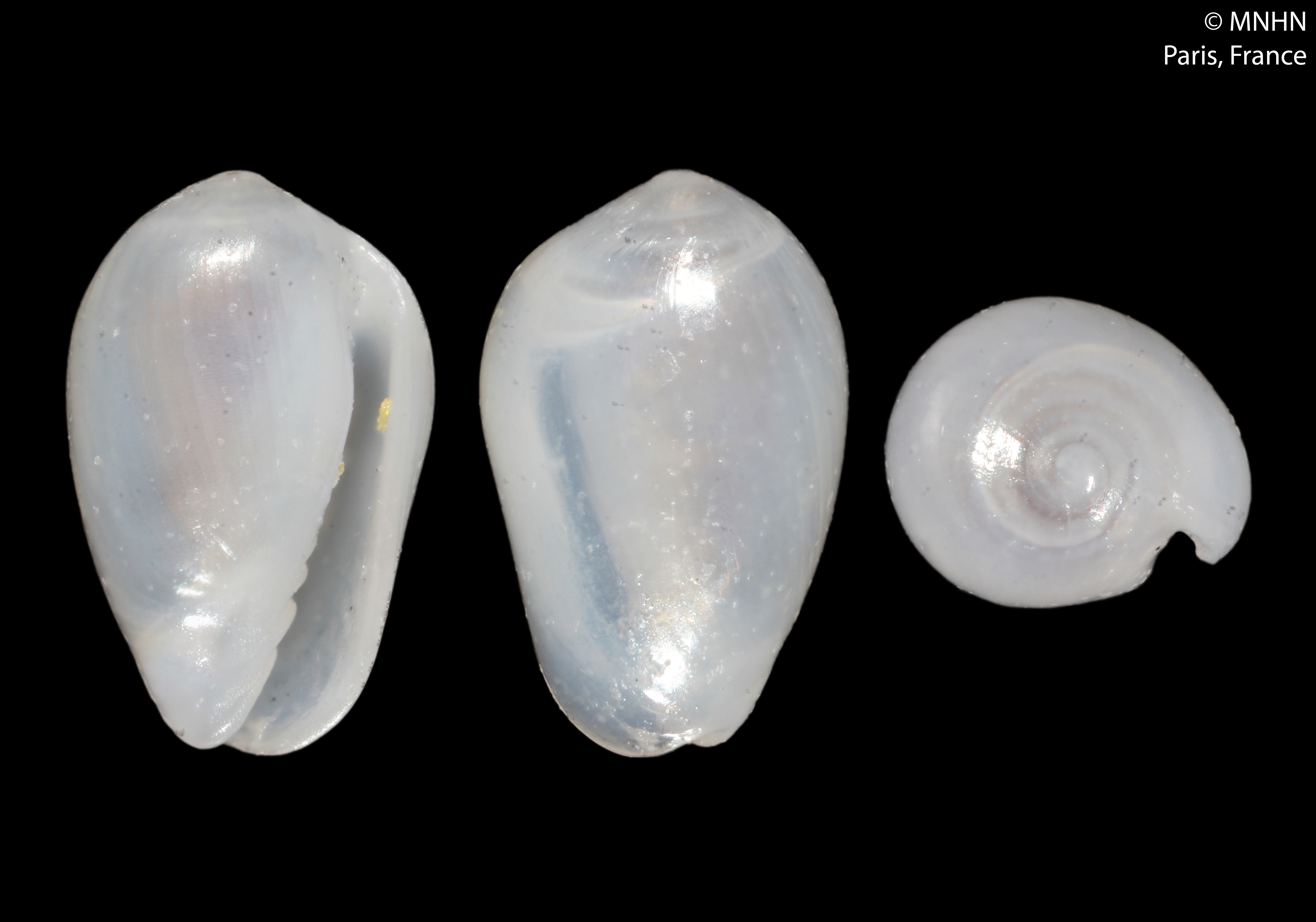
- Shell of Gibberula goodallae (holotype at MNHN, Paris)

Scientific classification
- Kingdom: Animalia
- Phylum: Mollusca
- Class: Gastropoda
- Subclass: Caenogastropoda
- Order: Neogastropoda
- Family: Cystiscidae
- Subfamily: Cystiscinae
- Genus: Gibberula
- Species: G. goodallae

Binomial name
- Gibberula goodallae Ortea, 2015

= Gibberula goodallae =

Species of gastropod

Gibberula goodallae is a species of sea snail, a marine gastropod mollusk, in the family Cystiscidae. It is named after British primatologist Jane Goodall.

== Description ==
The length of the shell attains 1.92 mm.

== Distribution ==
This marine species occurs off Guadeloupe.
