= Acmaeoderopsis =

Scientific classification
- Kingdom: Animalia
- Phylum: Arthropoda
- Class: Insecta
- Order: Coleoptera
- Suborder: Polyphaga
- Infraorder: Elateriformia
- Family: Buprestidae
- Subtribe: Acmaeoderina
- Genus: Acmaeoderopsis; Barr, 1974

Genus of beetles

Acmaeoderopsis is a genus of beetles in the family Buprestidae, containing the following species:

- Acmaeoderopsis chisosensis (Knull, 1952)
- Acmaeoderopsis guttifera (LeConte, 1859)
- Acmaeoderopsis hassayampae (Knull, 1961)
- Acmaeoderopsis hualpaiana (Knull, 1952)
- Acmaeoderopsis hulli (Knull, 1928)
- Acmaeoderopsis jaguarina (Knull, 1938)
- Acmaeoderopsis junki (Théry, 1929)
- Acmaeoderopsis paravaripilis (Barr, 1972)
- Acmaeoderopsis prosopis Davidson, 2006
- Acmaeoderopsis rockefelleri (Cazier, 1951)
- Acmaeoderopsis vaga (Barr, 1972)
- Acmaeoderopsis varipilis (Van Dyke, 1934)
- Acmaeoderopsis westcotti (Barr, 1972)
