= Acmaeoderopsis rockefelleri =

Scientific classification
- Kingdom: Animalia
- Phylum: Arthropoda
- Class: Insecta
- Order: Coleoptera
- Suborder: Polyphaga
- Infraorder: Elateriformia
- Family: Buprestidae
- Genus: Acmaeoderopsis
- Species: A. rockefelleri

Binomial name
- Acmaeoderopsis rockefelleri (Cazier, 1951)

Species of beetle

Acmaeoderopsis rockefelleri is a species of metallic wood-boring beetle in the family Buprestidae. It is found in Central America and North America. It lives on Acacia constricta and Prosopia juliflora.
