= Liolaemus basadrei =

Scientific classification
- Kingdom: Animalia
- Phylum: Chordata
- Class: Reptilia
- Order: Squamata
- Suborder: Iguania
- Family: Liolaemidae
- Genus: Liolaemus
- Species: L. basadrei

Binomial name
- Liolaemus basadrei Valladares-Faúndez, León, Chipana, Navarro Guzmán, Ignacio-Apaza, Musaja, Langstroth, Aguilar-Kirigin, Gutierrez, & Abdala, 2021

Species of lizard

Liolaemus basadrei is a species of lizard in the family Liolaemidae. It is native to Peru.
