= Réserve Cousteau =

Coordinates: 16°09′43″N 61°47′16″W

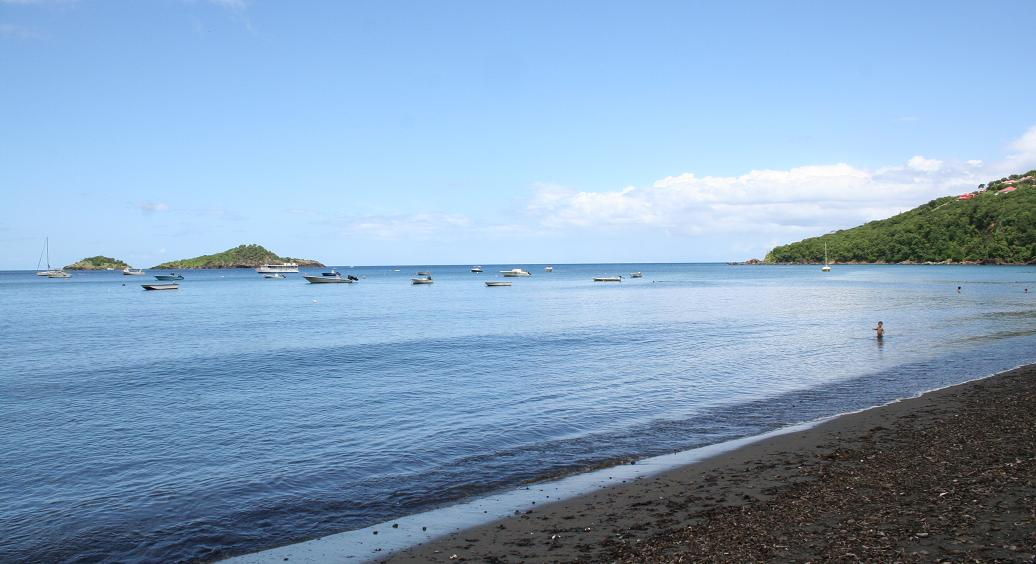
Maledure beach, looking towards the Pigeon Islands

Réserve Cousteau is a protected marine area, located mainly in the municipality of Bouillante and partly in that of Pointe-Noire on coast of the island of Basse-Terre in Guadeloupe. It formed an area of about 400 hectares around the Pigeon Islands, facing Malendure beach. The area was protected to take care of the seabed and limit fishing. The area is rich in biodiversity, from coral reef sponges to turtles, crayfish, eels and seahorses.
