= Sinatra pacificus =

Scientific classification
- Domain: Eukaryota
- Kingdom: Animalia
- Phylum: Arthropoda
- Class: Insecta
- Order: Hymenoptera
- Family: Figitidae
- Genus: Sinatra; Buffington, 2011
- Species: S. pacificus

Binomial name
- Sinatra pacificus Buffington, 2011

Species of wasp

Sinatra is a monotypic genus of wasps belonging to the family Figitidae. The only species is Sinatra pacificus.
