= Cybellela =

Scientific classification
- Kingdom: Animalia
- Phylum: Arthropoda
- Clade: †Artiopoda
- Class: †Trilobita
- Order: †Phacopida
- Family: †Encrinuridae
- Genus: †Cybellela; Reed, 1928

Extinct genus of trilobites

Cybellela is an extinct genus of trilobites in the order Phacopida. It lived during the middle-Ordovician period in Russia.
