= Walls of Palmyra =

The walls of Palmyra are a series of protective fortifications that providing customs barrier as well as protection for Palmyra from invaders and Bedouins. The development process of the walls can be separated into three stages; the first dates to the first century AD, and the second dates to the reign of the Roman Emperor Aurelian in the third century. The third was an improvement of the Aurelian walls commissioned by emperor Diocletian in the fourth century. The pre-Aurelian walls did not encircle the whole city and were not designed to protect it from conquest, but to provide protection from marauders. The Aurelian and Diocletian walls, although surrounding a smaller area, provided a higher degree of protection as they tightly enclosed the city.

== History ==
=== The first century walls ===
These walls were constructed in the first century AD, but they did not form a circuit around Palmyra. They did not include protective towers, and not only surrounded the residential areas, but also the gardens of the oasis which allowed Palmyra to exist. Many areas where natural formations provided protection were not fortified; for example, the western side of the city, naturally protected by the slopes of the Palmyrene mountains, was not protected by those walls. These early fortifications provided the city and its garden with protection against the sands of the Syrian Desert, kept the Bedouin bandits outside, and enabled the city to control the commercial activities.

=== The walls of Aurelian ===
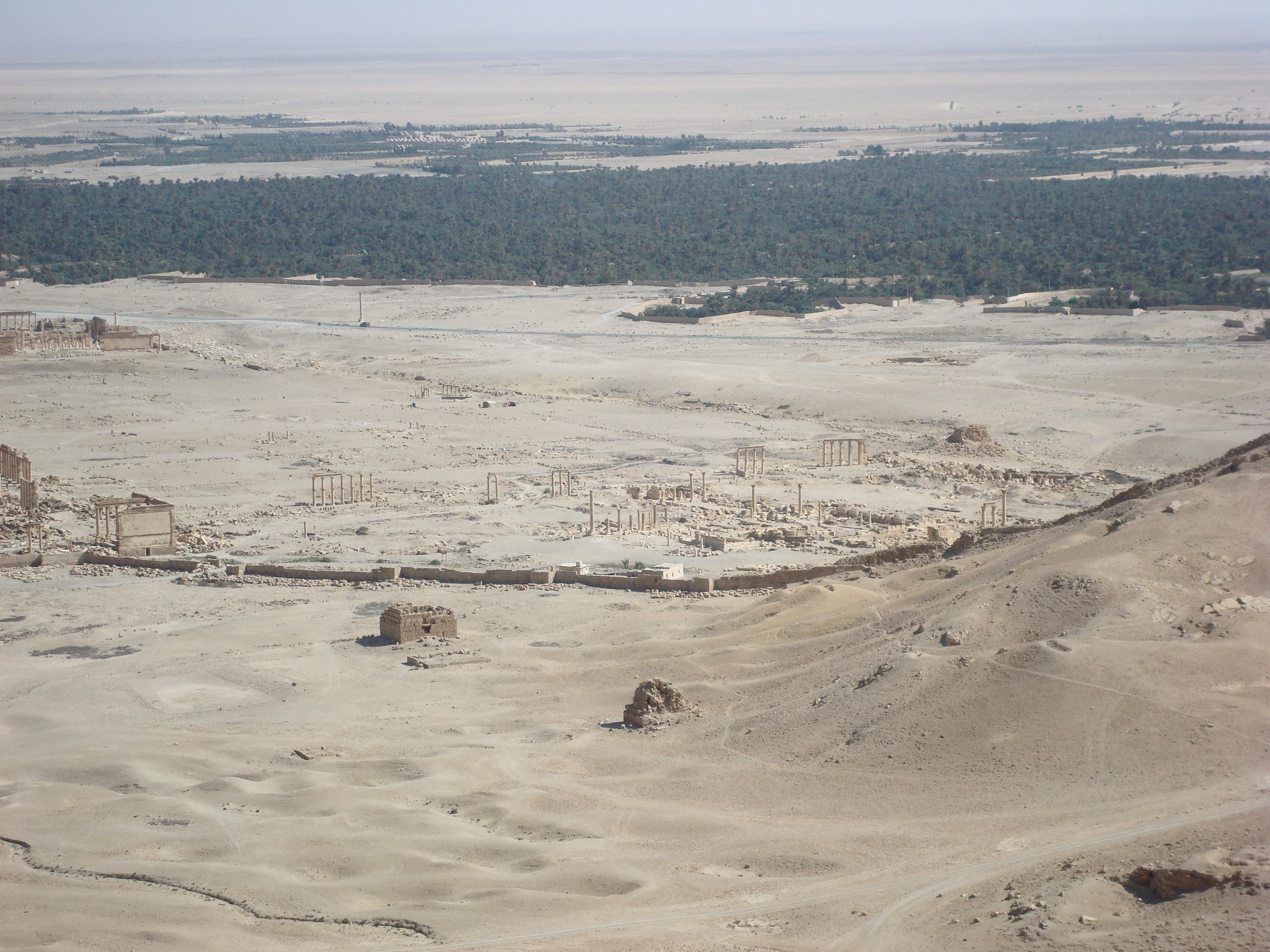
Overview of the Aurelian wall, called Diocletian wall

Well preserved, the walls commonly known as the walls of Diocletian and attributed to his reign, were more likely built by emperor Aurelian following his sack of the city in 273. The notion that Diocletian built those walls stem from the fact that his governor Sossianus Hierocles built the principia (headquarter of a Roman fort) of Palmyra. However, epigraphic and archaeological evidence suggest that Aurelian stationed the Legio I Illyricorum in the city, and it is implausible that the emperor left the city without protection. The walls of Sossianus Hierocles’ structures are clearly attached to the city’s walls and were not an original part of them; hence, the traditionally called “Diocletian walls” date to an era earlier than that emperor’s reign. The Aurelian walls left the southern parts of the city outside their limits. They encircled the area which they were meant to protect and included square towers.

=== The improvements of Diocletian ===
U-shaped towers, of different materials and construction techniques, can be attributed to the reign of Diocletian. Earlier twentieth century historians, such as Henri Seyrig and Denis Van Berchem, attributed those towers to the reign of emperor Justinian in the sixth century, based on the writings of the historian Procopius, who stated that Justinian strengthened the city’s defences. However, the majority of other Roman U-shaped towers in the region date to the fourth century. Comparative analysis of the Palmyrene U-shaped towers and similar structures from the region that are firmly dated to the fourth century suggests strongly that those defences are the work of Diocletian rather than Justinian. The statement of Procopius might be an exaggeration; this does not mean that Justinian did not restore the city’s walls, but it does not indicate the construction of new ramparts.
