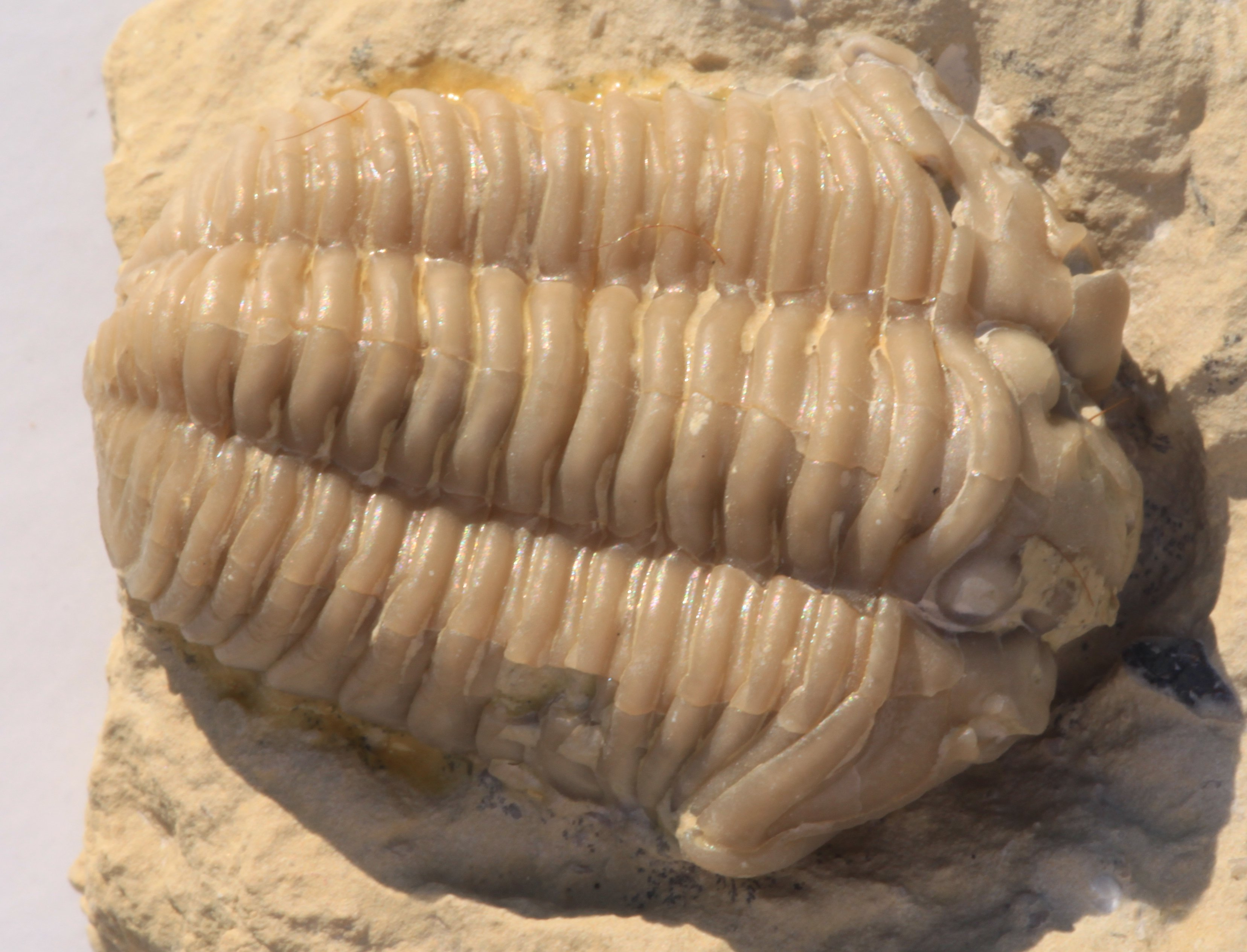
- Calymene clavicula 32mm, Henryhouse Formation, Oklahoma, Cayugan

Scientific classification
- Kingdom: Animalia
- Phylum: Arthropoda
- Clade: †Artiopoda
- Class: †Trilobita
- Order: †Phacopida
- Family: †Calymenidae
- Genus: †Calymene; Brongniart, 1822

Type species
- Calymene blumenbachii Brongniart, 1822

= Calymene =

Calymene Temporal range: Tremadocian-Pragian ~489–409 Ma

Extinct genus of trilobites

Calymene is a genus of trilobites in the order Phacopida, suborder Calymenina, that are found throughout North America, North Africa, and Europe in primarily Silurian outcrops. Calymene is closely related to Flexicalymene, and both genera are frequently found enrolled. Calymene trilobites are small, typically 2 cm in length. The cephalon is the widest part of the animal and the thorax usually has 13 segments.

The correct genus authorship is Brongniart (1822). A previously published genus description in Desmarest (1816) (often mis-cited as "Calymena" Desmarest, 1817) was suppressed by ICZN Opinion 1433.

== Etymology ==
Calymene - meaning beautiful crescent as a reference to the glabella.

== Known species and locations ==
- †Calymene blumenbachii, Dudley, England - Type
- †Calymene brevicapitata, N. and S. Wales
- †Calymene breviceps, Indiana and Illinois
- †Calymene celebra, Illinois, Indiana, and Wisconsin.
- †Calymene clavicula, Oklahoma
- †Calymene daviesii, Radnorshire, Wales
- †Calymene duplicata, Wales and Ireland
- †Calymene hopkinsoni, Wales
- †Calymene niagarensis, New York
- †Calymene parvifrons, Wales
- †Calymene senaria, N. Wales and Ireland
- †Calymene tristani, Cornwall, England
- †Calymene tuberculata, Gotland, Sweden
- †Calymene vogdesi, Ohio
- †Calymene sp. in the Silurian–Ordovician of Morocco

=== Reassigned species ===
Since the genus Calymene was established early on in paleontology, a number of species previously assigned to it have since been transferred to other genera:

- C. aculeata = Parasolenopleura aculeata
- C. aequalis = Archegonus aequalis
- C. anchiops = Anchiopella anchiops
- C. arachnoides = Asteropyge arachnoides
- C. arago = Colpocoryphe arago
- C. articulata = Crotalocephalus articulatus
- C. baylei = Metacalymene baylei
- C. bellatula = Cybele bellatula
- C. bufo rana = Phacops rana
- C. calicephala = Orimops calicephala
- C. canaliculata = Solenopleura canaliculata
- C. cambrensis = Flexicalymene cambrensis
- C. caractaci = Flexicalymene caractaci
- C. clavifrons = Cyrtometopus clavifrons
- C. concinna = Proetus concinnus
- C. diademata = Diacalymene diademata
- C. downingiae = Acaste downingiae
- C. frontiloba = Pliomera fischeri
- C. granulata = Phacops granulatus
- C. holometopa = Solenopleura holometopa
- C. marginata = Perliproetus marginata
- C. odini = Chasmops odini
- C. ornata = Ceraurinella ornata
- C. papillata = Papillicalymene papillata
- C. platycephala = Platycoryphe platycephala
- C. polytoma = Pliomera fischeri
- C. sclerops = Pterygometopus sclerops
- C. sinensis = Blackwelderia sinensis
- C. speciosa = Parapilekia speciosa
- C. stenometopa = Acrocephalites stenometopus
- C. stokesii = Phacopidae, generic assignment uncertain
- C. tingi = Calymenesun tingi
- C. tournemini = Placoparia tournemini
- C. tristani = Synhomalonotus tristani
- C. unicornis = Reedocalymene unicornis
- C. variolaris = Balizoma variolaris
- C. verrucosa = Atractopyge verrucosa
- C. volborthi = Ptychometopus volborthi
