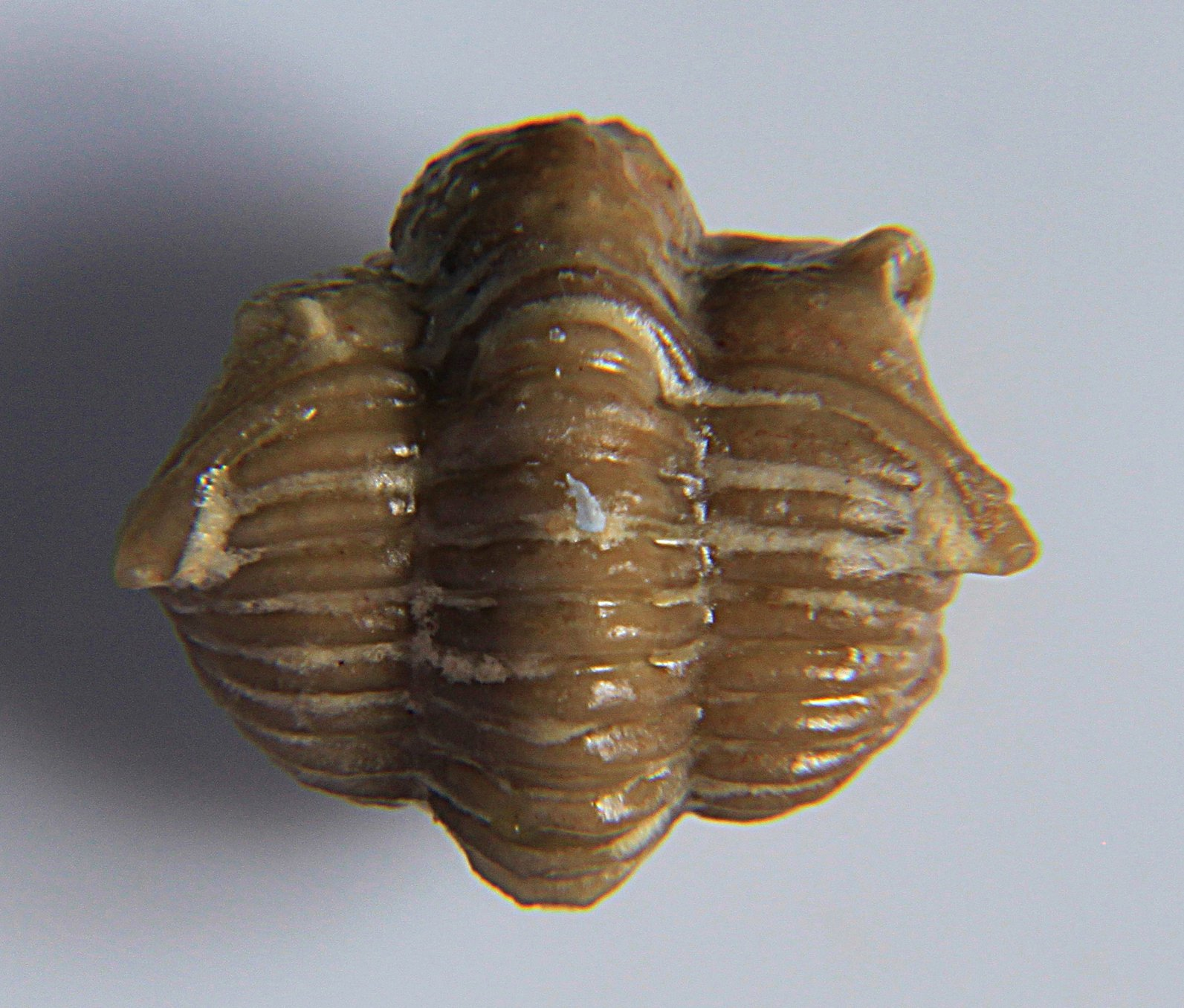
- Frencrinuroides capitonis

Scientific classification
- Domain: Eukaryota
- Kingdom: Animalia
- Phylum: Arthropoda
- Class: †Trilobita
- Order: †Phacopida
- Family: †Encrinuridae
- Genus: †Frencrinuroides; Lesperance & Desbiens, 1995

= Frencrinuroides =

Genus of trilobites

Frencrinuroides is a genus of trilobites in the order Phacopida (family Encrinuridae), that existed during the upper Ordovician in what is now the United States. It was described by Lesperance and Desbiens in 1995, and the type species is Frencrinuroides capitonis, which was originally described under the genus Encrinuroides by Frederickson in 1964. The type locality was the Bromide Formation in Oklahoma.
