= Deacybele =

Scientific classification
- Domain: Eukaryota
- Kingdom: Animalia
- Phylum: Arthropoda
- Class: †Trilobita
- Order: †Phacopida
- Family: †Encrinuridae
- Genus: †Deacybele; Whittington, 1965

Genus of trilobites

Deacybele is a genus of trilobites in the order Phacopida, that existed during the upper Ordovician in what is now Ireland. It was described by Whittington in 1965, and the type species is Deacybele arenosa, which was originally described under the genus Calymene by McCoy in 1846. The type locality was the Avoca Formation.
