= Damas Bishop of Magnesia =

Damas was Bishop of the church in Magnesia during the early 2nd century AD, exact dates uncertain.

He is reputed to have gone out to meet Ignatius of Antioch as he was escorted by Roman soldiers along the road to Smyrna. Ignatius entrusted to him a letter to his church. That letter has gone on to become a statement of Christian doctrine.

In that letter Ignatius of Antioch exhorts the church in Magnesia to not treat him "too familiarly on account of his youth, but to yield all reverence to him"

and it becometh you also not to presume upon the youth of your bishop, but according to the power of God the Father to render unto him all reverence, even as I have learned that the holy presbyters also have not taken advantage of his outwardly youthful estate, but give place to him as to one prudent in God

This event is recorded in Eucibius.

So when he came to Smyrna, where Polycarp was, he wrote an epistle to the church of Ephesus, in which he mentions Onesimus, its pastor; and another to the church of Magnesia, situated upon the Mæander, in which he makes mention again of a bishop Damas; and finally one to the church of Tralles, whose bishop, he states, was at that time Polybius.
