= Eodindymene =

Scientific classification
- Domain: Eukaryota
- Kingdom: Animalia
- Phylum: Arthropoda
- Class: †Trilobita
- Order: †Phacopida
- Family: †Encrinuridae
- Genus: †Eodindymene; Kielan, 1960

Extinct genus of trilobites

Eodindymene is a genus of trilobites in the order Phacopida, that existed during the upper Ordovician in what is now Sweden. It was described by Kielan in 1960, and the type species in Eodindymene pulchra, which was originally described under the genus Dindymene by Olin in 1906. The type locality was the Tretaspis Shale Formation in Scania.
