= Diocese of Magnesia =

The Diocese of Magnesia was an ancient Bishopric of Early Christianity.

The seat of the bishopric was the town of Magnesia on the Maeander in western Turkey, and Hierocles ranks it among the bishoprics of the province of Asia. Later documents seem to imply that at one time it bore the name of Maeandropolis.

== Known bishops of Magnesia ==
- Saint Charalambos
- Damas, Bishop of Magnesia at the time of Saint Ignatius
- Leontius, Bishop of Magnesia, who at the Council of Chalcedon declared that from Timothy to the time of Chalcedon there had been 26 Bishops of Ephesisus
- Macarius, contemporary of St. Chrysostom
- Daphnus fl 431
- Leontius at the Robber-Council (449)
- Patritius at the synod in Trullo (692)
- Theophilus at Constantinople (879)
