= Encrinuraspis =

Scientific classification
- Kingdom: Animalia
- Phylum: Arthropoda
- Clade: †Artiopoda
- Class: †Trilobita
- Order: †Phacopida
- Family: †Encrinuridae
- Genus: †Encrinuraspis; Webby, Moors & McLean, 1970

Genus of trilobites

Encrinuraspis is an extinct genus of trilobites in the order Phacopida.
