= Struszia mccartneyi =

Scientific classification
- Kingdom: Animalia
- Phylum: Arthropoda
- Clade: †Artiopoda
- Class: †Trilobita
- Order: †Phacopida
- Family: †Encrinuridae
- Genus: †Struszia
- Species: †S. mccartneyi

Binomial name
- †Struszia mccartneyi Edgecombe & Chatterton, 1993

Extinct species of trilobite

Struszia mccartneyi is a species of trilobite found in Silurian deposits of the Mackenzie Mountains in Canada. It is named after British musician Paul McCartney, being one of several in the genus Struszia named after members of The Beatles or people connected to the band.

== See also ==
- List of organisms named after famous people (born 1925–1949)
