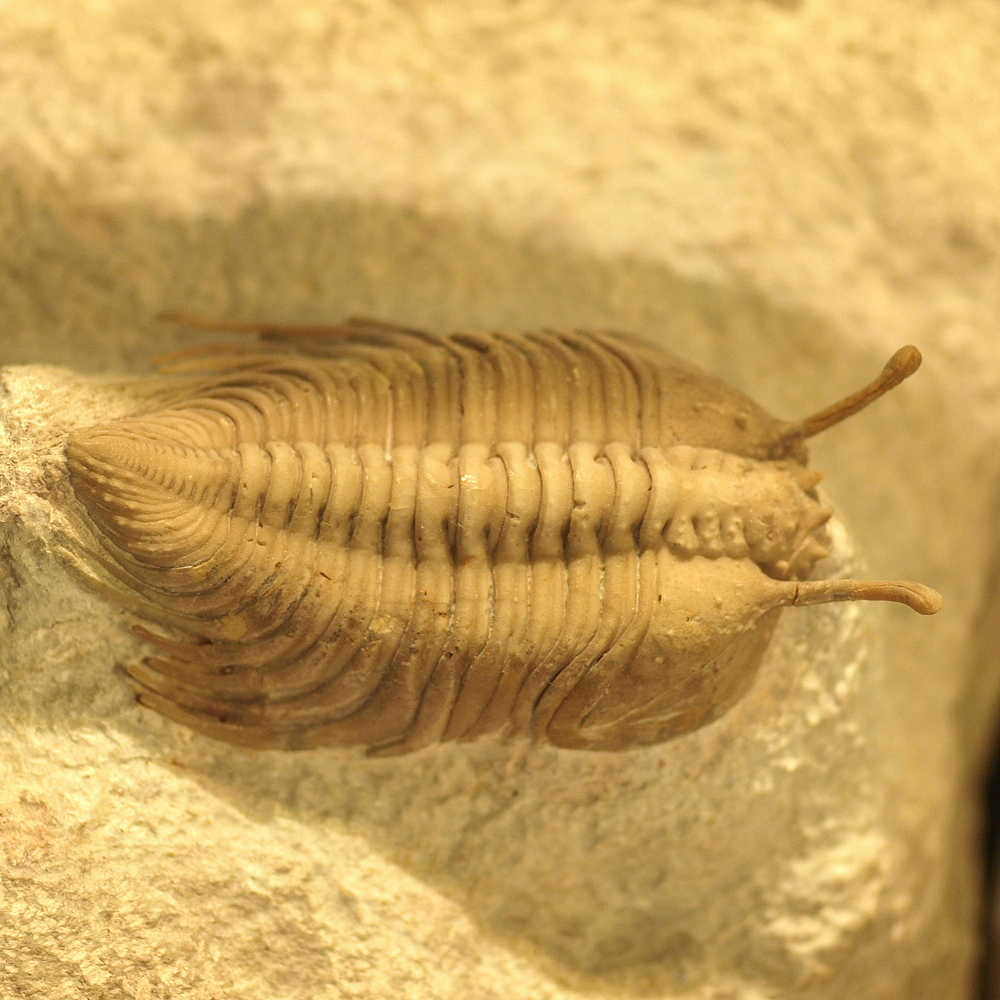

Scientific classification
- Kingdom: Animalia
- Phylum: Arthropoda
- Clade: †Artiopoda
- Class: †Trilobita
- Order: †Phacopida
- Family: †Encrinuridae
- Genus: †Cybele
- Species: †C. bellatula

Binomial name
- †Cybele bellatula (Dalman, 1827)

= Cybele bellatula =

Cybele bellatula Temporal range: Lower Ordovician

Extinct species of trilobite

Cybele bellatula is the fossil of an extinct trilobite from the Lower Ordovician. The genus was named after Cybele, the ancient Oriental and Greco-Roman goddess representing Gaia, the deified Earth Mother. The specific name means 'pretty, little' and is used as a term of endearment.

Cybele bellatula grew to a maximum of about 45 millimetres (1.8 in) with an intriguing morphology; it shows deep, thin lateral furrows, long eye-stalks, exceeding the cephalon in length, and a tiny visual surface; its eye-stalks are about 0.5 mm in diameter; its glabella is covered in tubercles. This trilobite fossil occurs in Russia, Sweden and Norway.

The Encrinuridae were a family of trilobites that occurred over regions that would eventually be Africa, Asia, Australia, Europe, North America, and South America. They flourished in the Paleozoic from the Middle Ordovician to the Early Devonian, that is for a period of about 67 million years from 479 to 412 million years ago.

The trilobites were a large and diverse group, numbering over 10,000 species. They appeared, flourished and became extinct in the Paleozoic. In the early Paleozoic their success was such that they outnumbered and were more diverse than most of their contemporaries.
