= Bevanopsis =

Scientific classification
- Domain: Eukaryota
- Kingdom: Animalia
- Phylum: Arthropoda
- Class: †Trilobita
- Order: †Phacopida
- Family: †Encrinuridae
- Genus: †Bevanopsis; Cooper, 1953

Extinct genus of trilobites

Bevanopsis is a genus of trilobites in the order Phacopida, which existed in what is now Virginia, United States. It was described by Cooper in 1953, and the type species is Bevanopsis ulrichi.
