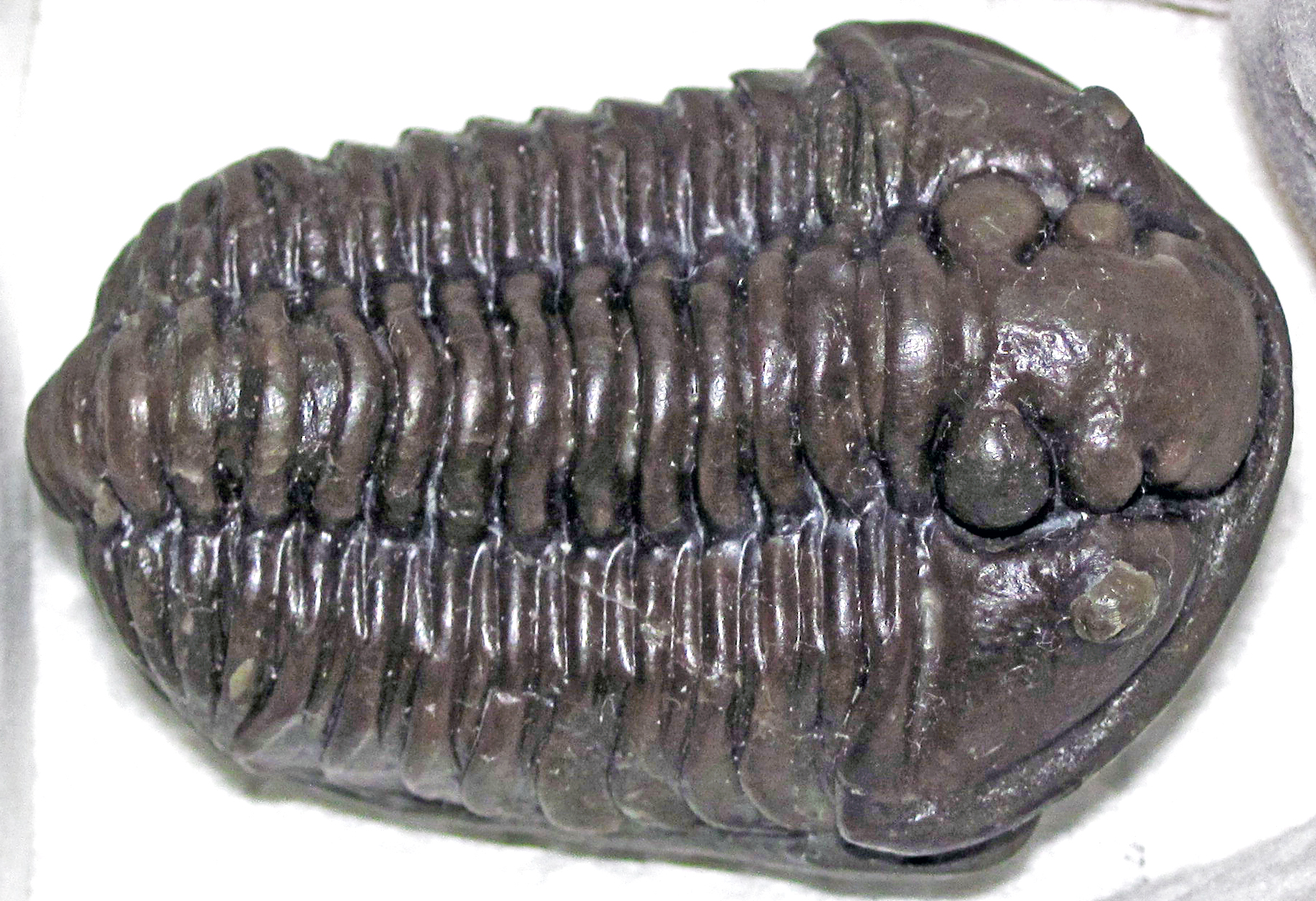
- C. blumenbachii fossil

Scientific classification
- Kingdom: Animalia
- Phylum: Arthropoda
- Clade: †Artiopoda
- Class: †Trilobita
- Order: †Phacopida
- Family: †Calymenidae
- Genus: †Calymene
- Species: †C. blumenbachii

Binomial name
- †Calymene blumenbachii Brongniart in Desmarest, 1817

= Calymene blumenbachii =

Calymene blumenbachii Temporal range: Wenlock ~428–422 Ma

Extinct species of trilobite

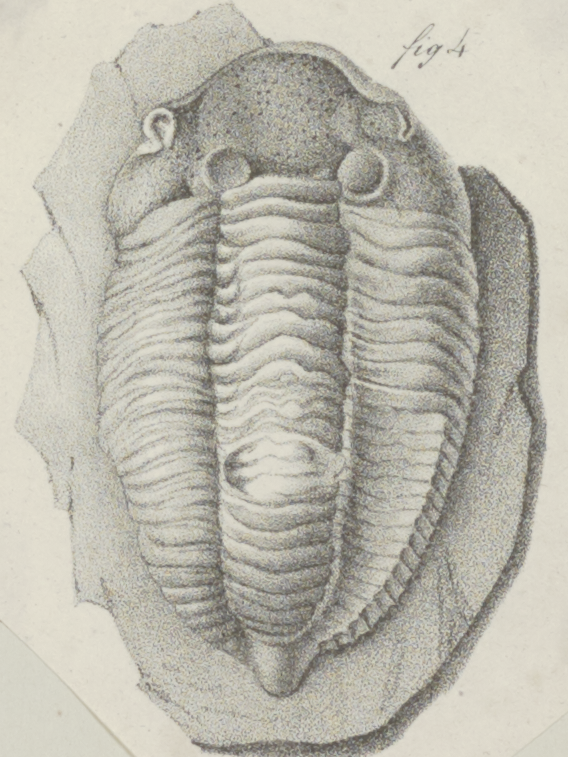
Calymene blumenbachii

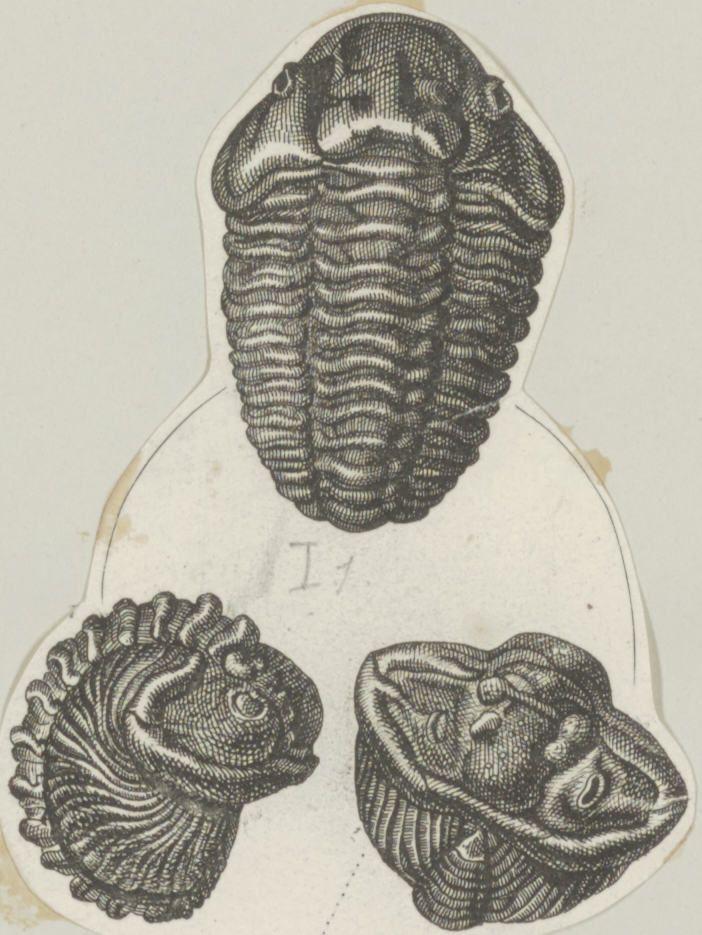
Calymene blumenbachii

Calymene blumenbachii, sometimes erroneously spelled blumenbachi, is a species of trilobite discovered in the limestone quarries of the Wren's Nest in Dudley, England. Nicknamed the Dudley bug or Dudley locust by 18th-century quarrymen it became a symbol of the town and featured on the Dudley County Borough Council coat-of-arms. Calymene blumenbachii is commonly found in Silurian rocks (422.5–427.5 million years ago) and is thought to have lived in the shallow waters of the Silurian, in low-energy reefs. This particular species of Calymene (a fairly common genus in the Ordovician-Silurian) is unique to the Wenlock series in England, and comes from the Wenlock Limestone Formation in Much Wenlock and the Wren's Nest in Dudley. These sites seem to yield trilobites more readily than any other areas on the Wenlock Edge, and the rock here is dark grey as opposed to yellowish or whitish as it appears on other parts of the Edge, just a few miles away, in Church Stretton and elsewhere. This suggests local changes in the environment in which the rock was deposited.
