= Aegrotocatellus =

Scientific classification
- Kingdom: Animalia
- Phylum: Arthropoda
- Clade: †Artiopoda
- Class: †Trilobita
- Order: †Phacopida
- Family: †Encrinuridae
- Genus: †Aegrotocatellus; Adrain & Edgecombe, 1995

Type species
- Aegrotocatellus jaggeri Adrain & Edgecome, 1995

Genus of trilobites

Aegrotocatellus is a genus of trilobites in the order Phacopida, which existed in what is now Nunavut, Canada. It was named by Adrain and Edgecombe in 1995, and the type species is Aegrotocatellus jaggeri, a species named after British musician Mick Jagger.

== See also ==
- Anomphalus jaggerius – snail named after Mick Jagger
- Jaggermeryx naida, extinct species of semiaquatic anthracothere named after Jagger
- Perirehaedulus richardsi a species of prehistoric trilobite named after British musician Keith Richards
- List of organisms named after famous people (born 1925–1949)
