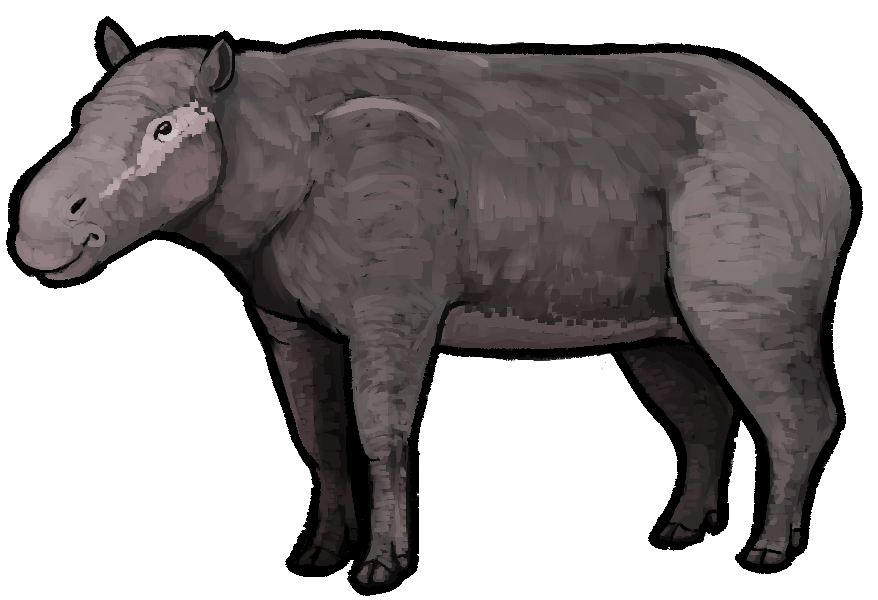
- Life Restoration

Scientific classification
- Kingdom: Animalia
- Phylum: Chordata
- Class: Mammalia
- Order: Artiodactyla
- Family: †Anthracotheriidae
- Genus: †Jaggermeryx
- Species: †J. naida

Binomial name
- †Jaggermeryx naida Miller et al., 2014

= Jaggermeryx =

Jaggermeryx Temporal range: Early Miocene ~19 Ma

Extinct genus of mammals

Jaggermeryx is an extinct genus of semiaquatic anthracothere, ungulates related to hippopotamuses, from the Early Miocene Moghara Formation in Egypt. The genus was named after Mick Jagger.

== Etymology ==
Its genus name, Jaggermeryx is derived from Jagger, after Mick Jagger, and meryx, the Greek word means ruminant, which is common suffix for genus name of artiodactyls. Species name, naida is derived from Naias, the Greek word means water nymph.

The decision was made to name the species after Jagger, lead singer for The Rolling Stones, because of its oversized lips. There was some debate among the team as to whether it should instead be named after Angelina Jolie. "Some of my colleagues suggested naming the new species after Hollywood star Angelina Jolie, because she also has famous lips," said lead author Ellen Miller. It was eventually settled to name the species after Jagger when co-author Gregg Gunnell sided with Miller.

== Discovery ==
The first fossils of the species were described in a monograph published by a French scientist in 1918. It was not until 2014, however, that the fossils were identified as a unique species from further specimens collected at Wadi Moghra in the Qattara Depression of Egypt. The fossils have been deposited at the Cairo Geological Museum, Cairo University, and Duke University.

At the site, six species of anthracotheres were discovered, but this sample was unlike other family members because of "a series of tiny holes on either side of its jaw that held the nerves providing sensation to the chin and lower lip."

The National Science Foundation supported the research.

== Description ==
The size of a small deer, J. naida probably looked somewhat like a skinny hippopotamus out-crossed with a long-legged pig. Fossilized jawbones contain a number of mental foramina, eight on each side of the jaw, indicating that the species had very sensitive lips and a mobile snout.

Pickford & Gawad (2025) maintained Jaggermeryx as a distinct anthracothere genus, but considered the type species J. naida to be synonymous with "Brachyodus" africanus Andrews (1899), resulting in a new combination Jaggermeryx africanus.

== Habitat ==
J. naida lived in the Qattara Depression around 19 million years ago, during the early Miocene. At that time the area, which is currently arid, was a tropical swamp. Jaggermeryx fossils have been found alongside those of catfish, turtles, and waterbirds, as well as six other species of anthracotheres and a number of crocodile coprolites.

== Paleobiology ==
The species was herbivorous, feeding on grasses and plants beside the water. Judging by the low oxygen isotope values of its teeth, J. naida is believed to have been semiaquatic, likely spending most of the time when it was not feeding in the water, not unlike a hippopotamus.

== See also ==
- Aegrotocatellus jaggeri – a species of trilobite named after Jagger
- Anomphalus jaggerius – a species of snail named after Jagger
- Perirehaedulus richardsi – a species of prehistoric trilobite named after British musician Keith Richards
- List of organisms named after famous people (born 1925–1949)
