= Alwynulus =

Scientific classification
- Domain: Eukaryota
- Kingdom: Animalia
- Phylum: Arthropoda
- Class: †Trilobita
- Order: †Phacopida
- Family: †Encrinuridae
- Genus: †Alwynulus; Tripp, 1967

Extinct genus of trilobites

Alwynulus is a genus of trilobites in the order Phacopida, which existed in what is now Scotland. It was described by Tripp in 1967, and the type species is Alwynulus peregrinus.
