= Dindymene =

Epithet of an Anatolian mother goddess

Dindymene (Ancient Greek: Δινδυμήνη), in ancient Phrygian mythology, is one of the names of Cybele, mother of the gods. Temples to Dindymene were built in parts of ancient Ionia, such as Magnesia on the Maeander.

The name may have been derived from Mount Dindymus in Phrygia, on whose slopes at Pessinus a temple to Cybele Dindymene was built. Legend held that temple was built by the Argonauts. It may also have derived from Dindyme, a name of the wife of Maeon and mother of Cybele.

In 1847, a trilobite genus was named after her.
