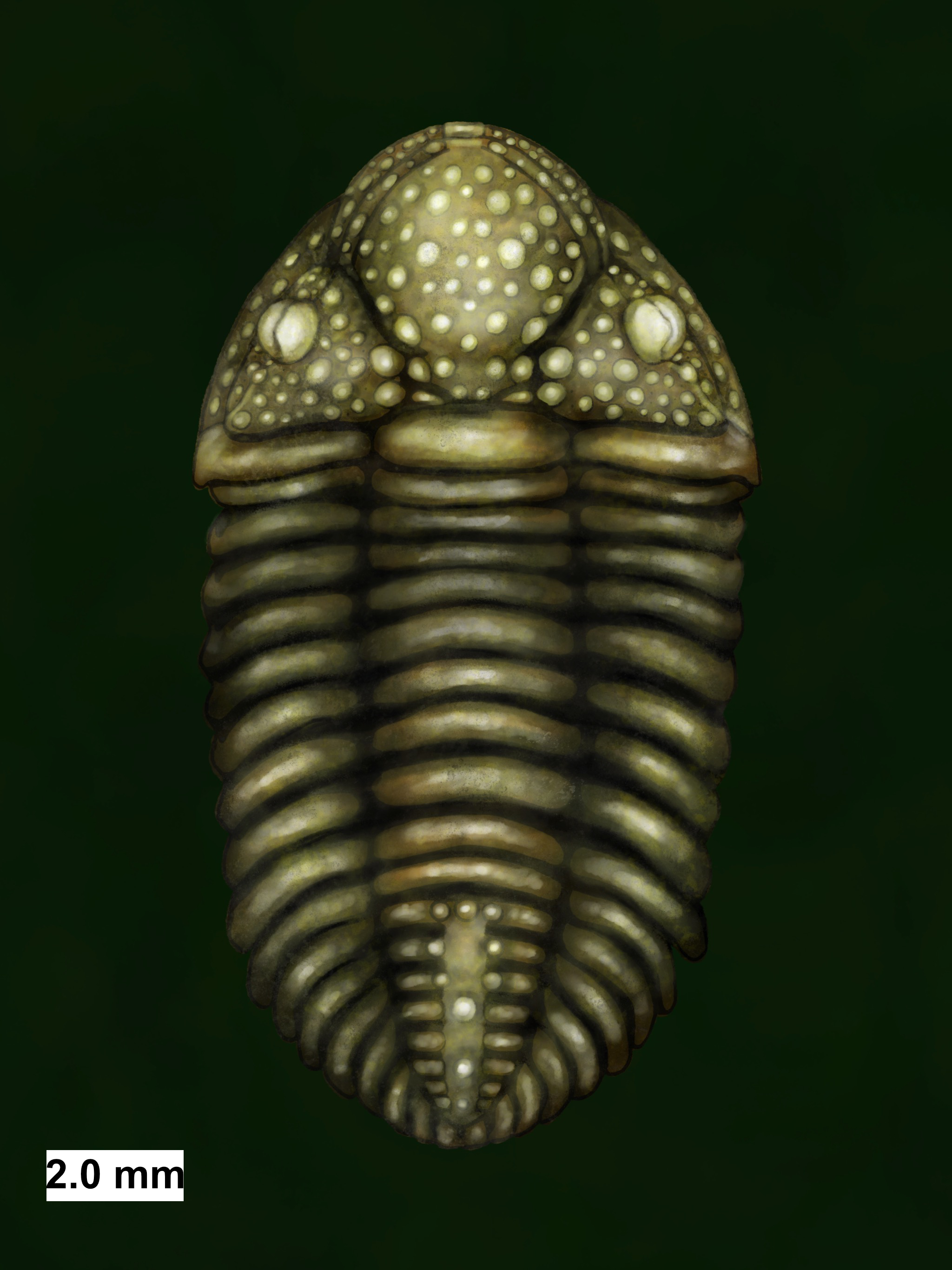
- Drawing of the Silurian trilobite Mackenziurus lauriae

Scientific classification
- Kingdom: Animalia
- Phylum: Arthropoda
- Clade: †Artiopoda
- Class: †Trilobita
- Order: †Phacopida
- Family: †Encrinuridae
- Genus: †Mackenziurus; Edgecombe & Chatterton, 1990

Type species
- Mackenziurus reimeri

= Mackenziurus =

Genus of trilobites

Mackenziurus is a genus of phacopid trilobites from the Silurian containing several species, including four named after members of the American punk band the Ramones.

== Species ==
The type species is M. reimeri, described by G.D. Edgecombe and B.D.E. Chatterton in 1990. The species named for members of the Ramones, all named by J.M. Adrain and G.D. Edgecombe in 1997, are:

- M. joeyi, named after Joey Ramone
- M. johnnyi, named after Johnny Ramone
- M. deedeei, named after Dee Dee Ramone
- M. ceejayi, named after C. J. Ramone

Additional Mackenziurus species include:

- M. lauriae Gass, Edgecombe, Ramsköld, Mikulic & Watkins, 1992
- M. emielityi Gass, 1999

== See also ==
- List of organisms named after famous people (born 1925–1949)
- List of organisms named after famous people (born 1950–1974)
