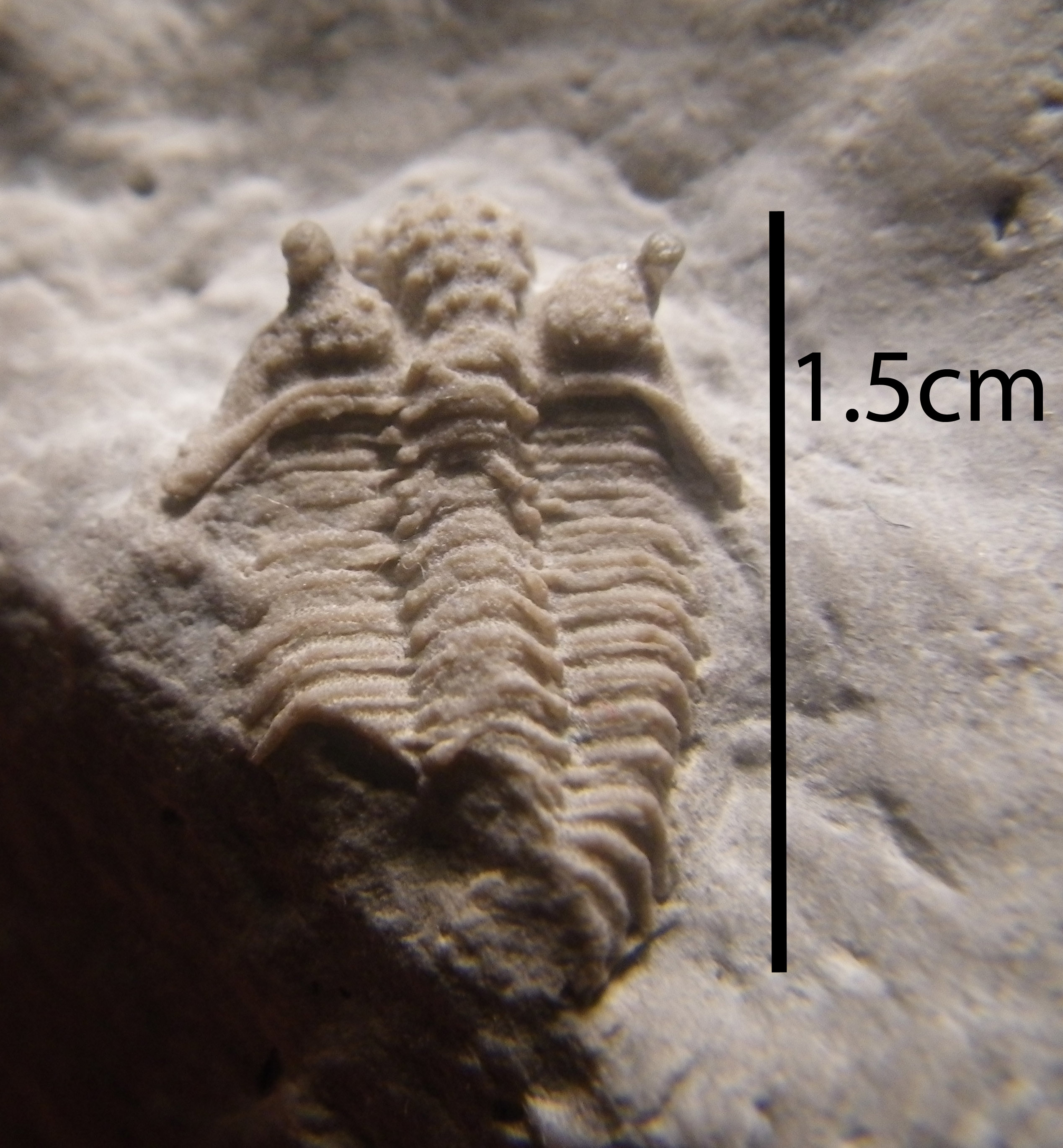
- Fossil of E. egani from the Racine Dolomite

Scientific classification
- Domain: Eukaryota
- Kingdom: Animalia
- Phylum: Arthropoda
- Class: †Trilobita
- Order: †Phacopida
- Family: †Encrinuridae
- Genus: †Encrinurus; Emmrich, 1844

= Encrinurus =

Encrinurus Temporal range: Mid Ordovician-Early Devonian ~472–412.3 Ma

Genus of trilobites

Encrinurus is a long-lived genus of phacopid trilobites that lived in what are now Africa, Asia, Australia, Europe, North America, and South America from the middle Ordovician to the early Devonian from 472 to 412.3 mya, existing for approximately 59.7 million years.

== Taxonomy ==
Encrinurus was named by Emmrich in 1844. Jell and Adrain (2003) list it as a currently valid genus name within the Phacopida, specifically within the Encrinuridae.
