= Macarius Magnes =

Christian apologetic author

Macarius Magnes (Ancient Greek: Μακάριος Μάγνης), sometimes referred to as Macarius of Magnesia, is the author of a work of Christian apologetics contesting the writings of a Neo-Platonic philosopher. He was unknown for centuries until the discovery of a manuscript at Athens in 1867. This work is called Ἀποκριτικός πρὸς Ἕλληνας (Apokritikós prós Éllinas) in Greek, and Apocriticus in Latin. It agrees in its dogmatics with Gregory of Nyssa, and is valuable on account of the numerous excerpts from the writings of the pagan opponent of Macarius. Macarius does not directly name the "Hellene" he is quoting from and criticizing, but it is most commonly speculated to be the philosopher Porphyry, who wrote a lost work called Against the Christians. The other named possibility mentioned is Hierocles's the Lover of Truth. It is also possible that whoever this opponent was, their name was lost to history and otherwise unrecorded in surviving documents.

He may be the Macarius, bishop of Magnesia, who, at the Synod of the Oak in 403, brought charges against Heraclides, bishop of Ephesus, the friend of John Chrysostom, although Adolf Harnack dated him in the late third century.

Like Macarius the Younger, this Macarius is frequently confused with Macarius of Egypt.

== Apocriticus ==
The manuscript itself of the Apocriticus discovered in Athens in 1867 likely dates from the fifteenth century. The work was edited and published by Charles Blondel in 1876. Both the time period Macarius lived, as well as that of his opponent, is unclear; the most common speculations are the fourth century for Macarius, and the third century for the Hellene.

Book 1, the first part of Book 2, and Book 5 of the Apocriticus are lost, leaving modern audiences with only a fragment of Book 2 and Books 3–4. Fragments of Book 1 and Book 5 survive in quotes elsewhere. The work is generally long quotes of the "Hellene" and their interpretation of Christian works, followed by refutations of their arguments. Book 2 focuses on the gospels; Book 3, further gospel quotes as well as the Acts of the Apostles and Paul; Book 4, further content on Paul's works as well as a section on the Apocalypse of Peter and Christian eschatology, angelology, demonology, and so on. The quotation of the Apocalypse of Peter is interesting to modern audiences, as the work was ultimately not included in the eventual list of what would be the New Testament. Similarly, there is no quotation of the General Epistles, 2 Peter, or the Apocalypse of John (Revelation), although it is possible the Hellene did address them, yet Magnes did not quote these attacks, or that they were discussed in Books 1 or 5. In the fourth century, the canon list was still in flux, and the Apocriticus provides some insight into both what works the mysterious pagan "Hellene" considered important enough to Christianity to attack, as well as what Macarius Magnes felt should be defended.

== Bibliography ==
- A. Capone, "The narrative sections of Macarius Magnes’ Apocriticus", in Lessico, argomentazioni e strutture retoriche nella polemica di età cristiana (III-V sec.), a c. di A. Capone, Turnhout 2012, pp. 253-270 .
