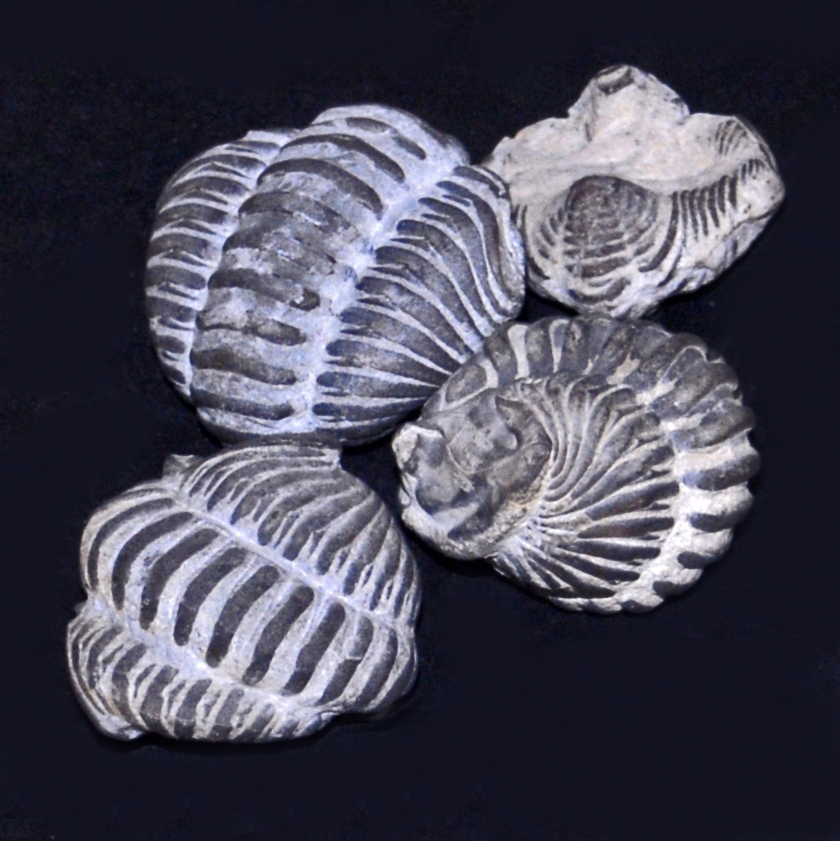
- Fossils of Calymene niagarensis from Ohio, United States, on display at Galerie de paléontologie et d'anatomie comparée in Paris

Scientific classification
- Domain: Eukaryota
- Kingdom: Animalia
- Phylum: Arthropoda
- Class: †Trilobita
- Order: †Phacopida
- Family: †Calymenidae
- Genus: †Calymene
- Species: †C. niagarensis

Binomial name
- †Calymene niagarensis Hall, 1843

= Calymene niagarensis =

Calymene niagarensis Temporal range: Middle Silurian

Species of trilobite

Calymene niagarensis is a species of trilobite belonging to the genus Calymene. These nektobenthic carnivores lived in the Middle Silurian, from 436.0 to 426.2 Ma.

== Description ==
Calymene niagarensis is a small species, reaching a length of about 4 centimetres (1.6 in) and a width of about 2.7 centimetres (1.1 in). It has around 20 body segments and small, round eyes.

== Distribution ==
Fossils of this species have been found in the Silurian sediments of United States. Most specimens have been found in New York and Oklahoma.
