= Perirehaedulus =

Perirehaedulus Temporal range: Ludlow

Scientific classification
- Kingdom: Animalia
- Phylum: Arthropoda
- Clade: †Artiopoda
- Class: †Trilobita
- Order: †Phacopida
- Family: †Encrinuridae
- Genus: †Perirehaedulus; Adrain & Edgecombe, 1995
- Species: †P. richardsi

Binomial name
- †Perirehaedulus richardsi Adrain & Edgecombe, 1995

Genus of trilobites

Perirehaedulus richardsi is a species of trilobites named after British musician Keith Richards. It is the only species in the genus Perirehaedulus.

== See also ==
- Aegrotocatellus jaggeri - a species of trilobite named after Mick Jagger
- Anomphalus jaggerius - a species of snail named after Jagger
- Jaggermeryx naida, extinct species of semiaquatic anthracothere after Jagger
- List of organisms named after famous people (born 1925–1949)
