= Kailia =

Kailia Temporal range: Early Silurian

Scientific classification
- Domain: Eukaryota
- Kingdom: Animalia
- Phylum: Arthropoda
- Class: †Trilobita
- Order: †Phacopida
- Family: †Encrinuridae
- Genus: †Kailia; W. Zhang, 1974

Species
- Kailia quadrisulcata Chang, 1974

Genus of trilobites

Kailia is a genus of trilobites in the order Phacopida (family Encrinuridae) that existed during the lower Silurian in what is now China. It was described by W. Zhang in 1974, and the type species is Kailia quadrisulcata. The type locality was the Xiushan Formation in Sichuan.
