= Fragiscutum =

Scientific classification
- Domain: Eukaryota
- Kingdom: Animalia
- Phylum: Arthropoda
- Class: †Trilobita
- Order: †Phacopida
- Family: †Encrinuridae
- Genus: †Fragiscutum; Whittington & Campbell, 1967

Genus of trilobites

Fragiscutum is a genus of trilobites in the order Phacopida, that existed during the Silurian in what is now the United States. It was described by Whittington and Campbell in 1967, and the type species is Fragiscutum rhytium. The type locality was the Hardwood Mountain Formation in Maine.
