= Anomphalus jaggerius =

Anomphalus jaggerius Temporal range: 290.1–279.5 Ma Permian

Scientific classification
- Kingdom: Animalia
- Phylum: Mollusca
- Class: Gastropoda
- Subclass: Vetigastropoda
- Order: Trochida
- Family: †Anomphalidae
- Genus: †Anomphalus
- Species: †A. jaggerius

Binomial name
- †Anomphalus jaggerius Plas, 1972

Species of mollusc (fossil)

Anomphalus jaggerius is an extinct species of Permian sea snail. Fossils have been found in Artinskian era limestone from the Bird Spring Formation in the southern Arrow Canyon Range of the US State of Nevada. The species, which had a shell 6.37 millimetres (0.251 in) wide, was a subtidal epifaunal grazer. It was named after Rolling Stones lead singer Mick Jagger.

== See also ==
- Aegrotocatellus jaggeri - a species of trilobite named after Jagger
- Jaggermeryx naida - a species of Miocene ungulate named after Jagger
- Perirehaedulus richardsi - a species of prehistoric trilobite named after British musician Keith Richards
- List of organisms named after famous people (born 1925–1949)
