= Brianurus =

Brianurus Temporal range: Lower Silurian, 436.0–428.2 Ma

Scientific classification
- Kingdom: Animalia
- Phylum: Arthropoda
- Clade: †Artiopoda
- Class: †Trilobita
- Order: †Phacopida
- Family: †Encrinuridae
- Genus: †Brianurus; Edgecombe and Fortey, 1995

Type species
- †Briania jeffersoni Edgecombe, 1994

Species
- †Brianurus jeffersoni (Edgecombe, 1994)

Synonyms
- †Briania Edgecombe, 1994 – preoccupied by Briania Chasen and Kloss, 1930 (Aves)

Extinct genus of trilobites

Brianurus is a genus of Silurian trilobites known from Canada. It was originally described from the Whittaker Formation (Northwest Territories). It is named after Professor Brian D. E. Chatterton from the University of Alberta.
