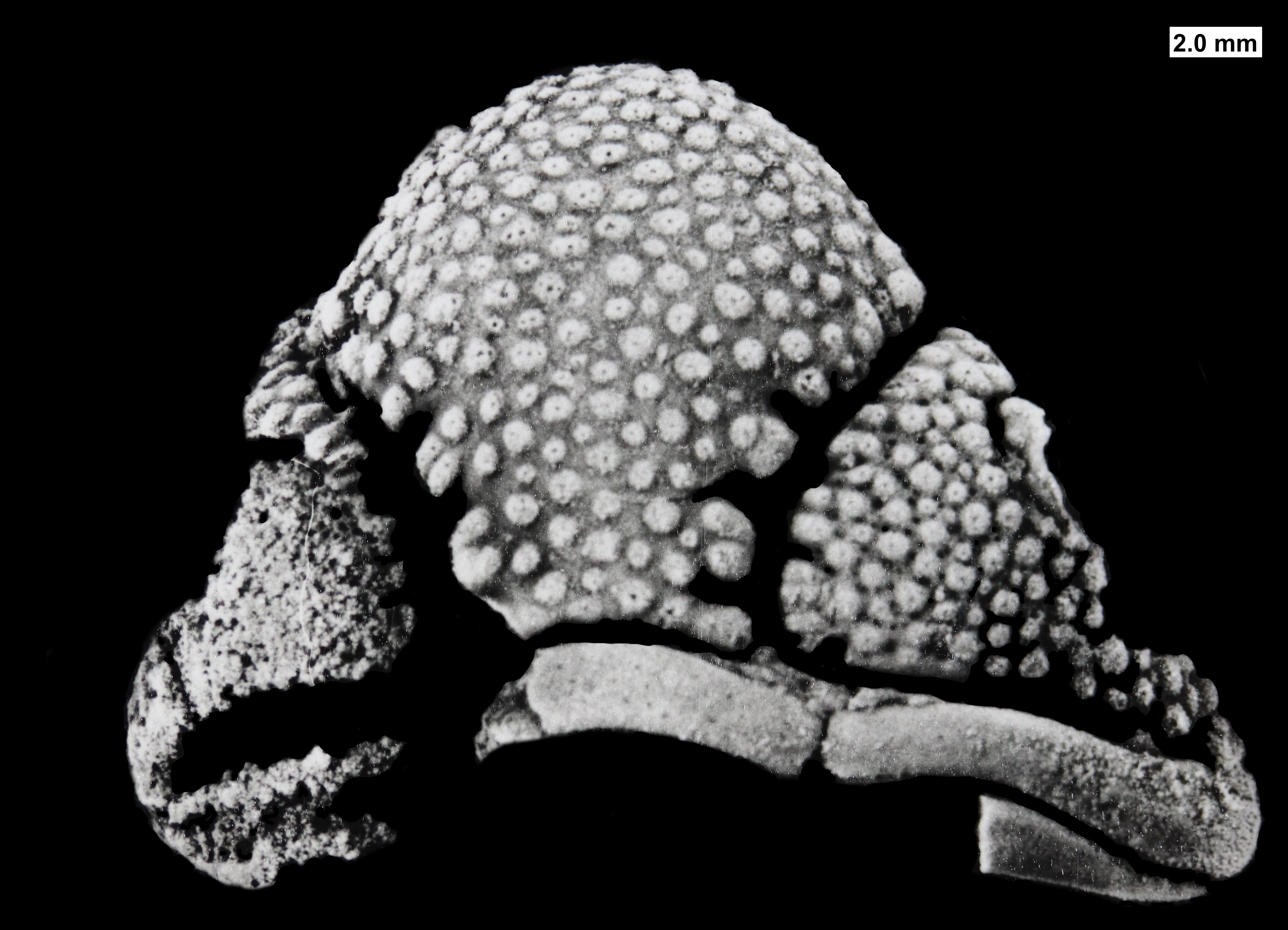
- Perryus severnensis from the Attawapiskat Formation of Ontario; cranidium; holotype of the type species

Scientific classification
- Domain: Eukaryota
- Kingdom: Animalia
- Phylum: Arthropoda
- Class: †Trilobita
- Order: †Phacopida
- Family: †Encrinuridae
- Genus: †Perryus; Gass & Mikulic 1982

= Perryus =

Perryus Temporal range: Early Silurian-Middle Silurian ~438–430 Ma

Genus of trilobites

Perryus is a genus of phacopid trilobites that lived in what are now Canada, Greenland, and Siberia from the early Silurian to the middle Silurian from 438 to 430 mya, existing for approximately 8 million years.

== Taxonomy ==
Perryus was named by Gass & Mikulic in 1982. Jell and Adrain list it as a currently valid genus name within the Phacopida, specifically within the Encrinuridae.

== Species included ==
Perryus bartletti Edgecombe & Chatterton, 1992; Perryus globosus (Maksimova, 1962); Perryus mikulici Hughes & Thomas, 2014; Perryus severnensis Gass & Mikulic, 1982 (type species); Perryus palasso (Lane, 1988)
