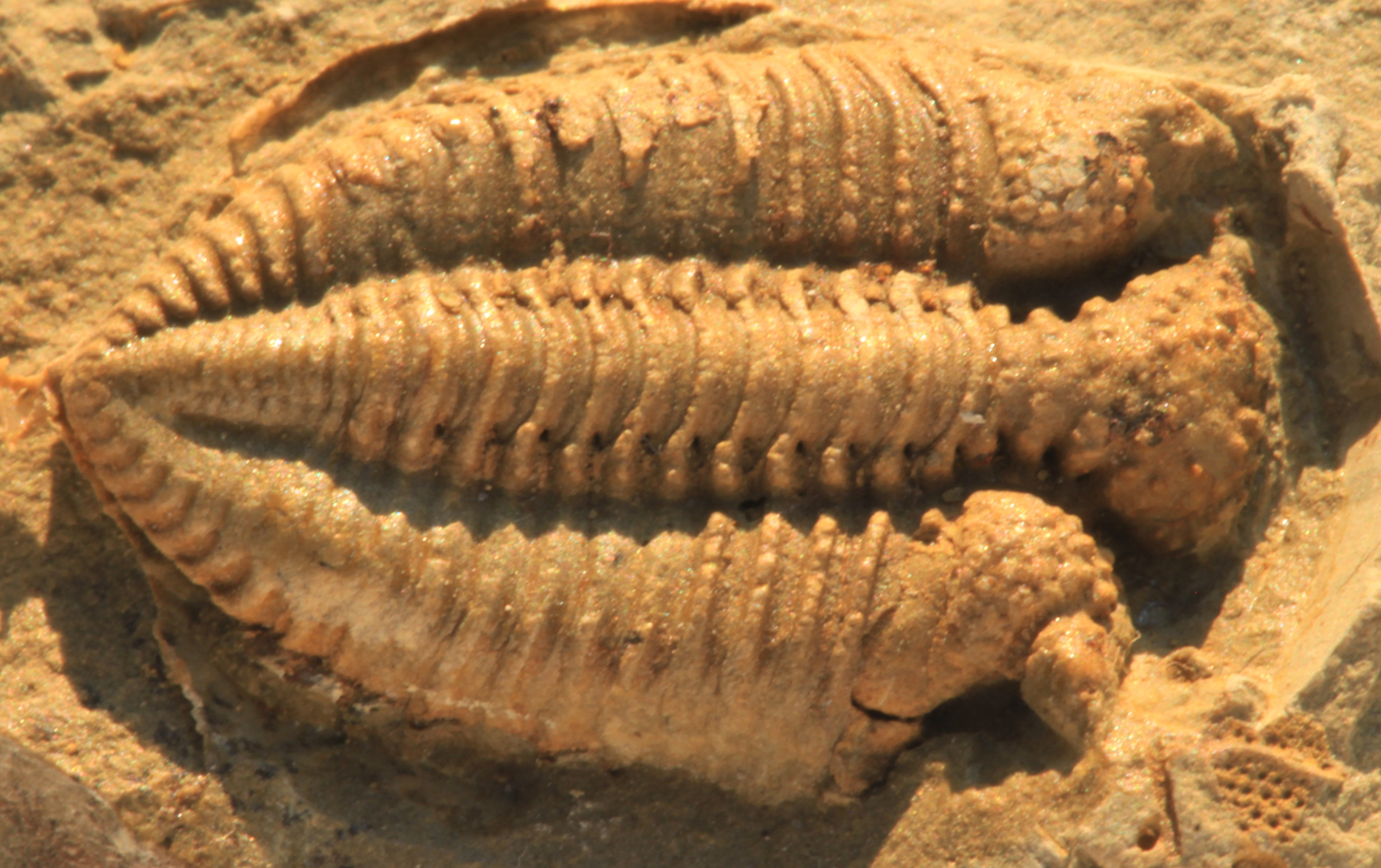
- Encrinuroides enshiensis

Scientific classification
- Domain: Eukaryota
- Kingdom: Animalia
- Phylum: Arthropoda
- Class: †Trilobita
- Order: †Phacopida
- Family: †Encrinuridae
- Genus: †Encrinuroides; Reed, 1931

= Encrinuroides =

Genus of trilobites

Encrinuroides is a genus of trilobites in the order Phacopida, that existed during the upper Ordovician in what is now Wales. It was described by Reed in 1931, and the type species is Encrinuroides sexcostata, which was originally described under the genus Cybele by Salter in 1848. It also contains the species, Encrinuroides enshiensis, Encrinuroides insularis, and Encrinuroides rarus. The type locality was in the Sholeshook Limestone Formation.

== Species ==
- Encrinuroides sexcostata (Salter, 1848)
- Encrinuroides enshiensis
- Encrinuroides rarus (Walcott, 1877) - Originally assigned to Ceraurus; later moved by Chatterton and Ludvigsen in 1976.
- Encrinuroides insularis Shaw, 1968
