= Dayongia =

Scientific classification
- Domain: Eukaryota
- Kingdom: Animalia
- Phylum: Arthropoda
- Class: †Trilobita
- Order: †Phacopida
- Family: †Encrinuridae
- Genus: †Dayongia; Xiang & Ji, 1986

Genus of trilobites

Dayongia is a genus of trilobites in the order Phacopida, that existed during the upper Ordovician in what is now China. It was described by Xiang and Ji in 1986, and the type species is Dayongia longicephala. The type locality was the Linxiang Formation, in Hunan.
