= Curriella =

Scientific classification
- Domain: Eukaryota
- Kingdom: Animalia
- Phylum: Arthropoda
- Class: †Trilobita
- Order: †Phacopida
- Family: †Encrinuridae
- Genus: †Curriella; Lamont, 1978

Genus of trilobites

Curriella is a genus of trilobites in the order Phacopida, that existed during the lower Silurian in what is now Scotland. It was described by Lamont in 1978, and the type species is Curriella newlandensis; the species epithet was derived from the type location, the Newlands Formation. It also contains the species C. clancyi.
