= Avalanchurus =

Scientific classification
- Kingdom: Animalia
- Phylum: Arthropoda
- Clade: †Artiopoda
- Class: †Trilobita
- Order: †Phacopida
- Family: †Encrinuridae
- Genus: †Avalanchurus; Edgecombe & Chatterton, 1993

Type species
- Avalanchurus lennoni Edgecombe & Chatterton, 1993

Species
- 5; see text

Extinct genus of trilobites

Avalanchurus is an extinct genus of trilobites from the Silurian period. It was originally described in 1993 as a subgenus of Struszia, and then promoted in 1997 to genus status.

== Species ==
The genus contains five described species, most of them named after famous musicians:

- Avalanchurus dakon (Šnajdr, 1983)
- Avalanchurus lennoni Edgecombe & Chatterton, 1993 (named in honour of John Lennon)
- Avalanchurus starri Edgecombe & Chatterton, 1993 (named in honour of Ringo Starr)
- Avalanchurus simoni Adrain & Edgecombe, 1997 (named in honour of Paul Simon)
- Avalanchurus garfunkeli Adrain & Edgecombe, 1997 (named in honour of Art Garfunkel)

== See also ==
- List of organisms named after famous people (born 1925–1949)
