= Erratencrinurus =

Scientific classification
- Domain: Eukaryota
- Kingdom: Animalia
- Phylum: Arthropoda
- Class: †Trilobita
- Order: †Phacopida
- Family: †Encrinuridae
- Genus: †Erratencrinurus; Krueger, 1972

Genus of trilobites

Erratencrinurus is a genus of trilobites in the order Phacopida, that existed during the upper Ordovician in what is now northern Germany. It was described from glacial erratics by Krueger in 1972, and the type species is Erratencrinurus capricornu.
