= Leucophrys =

Town of the ancient Ionia

Coordinates: 37°51′03″N 27°31′40″E

Leucophrys or Leukophrys (Ancient Greek: Λευκόφρυς) was a town of the ancient Ionia, and earlier of Caria in the plain of the Maeander river. It was on the borders of a lake, whose water was hot and in constant commotion. The town possessed a very revered sanctuary of Artemis; hence surnamed Artemis Leucophryene or Leucophryne. The poet Nicander spoke of Leucophrys as a place distinguished for its fine roses. Xenophon records that, in 398 BCE, Leucophrys was the site to which the Greek troops, under the command of the Spartan Dercylidas withdrew after the meeting between them and the troops of Achaemenid Empire led by the satraps Tissaphernes and Pharnabazus II. The next day in the place they had agreed to, they negotiated peace. The Persians would allow the Greek cities to be autonomous and the Greek army and the Laconian harmosts would return across the Aegean Sea.

Its site was later occupied by Magnesia ad Maeandrum.
