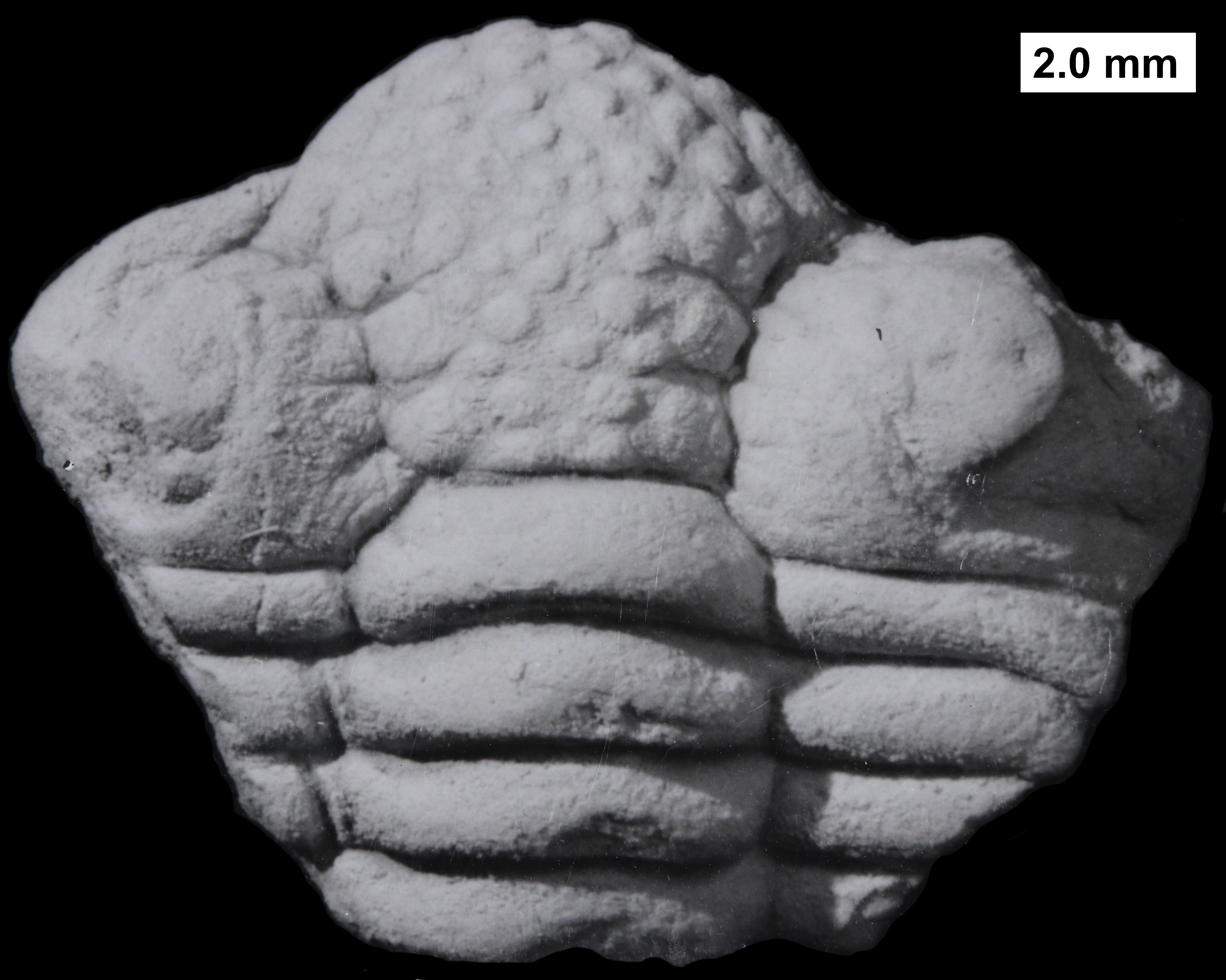
- Cranidium and part of thorax of Frammia arctica; lectotype of the type species.

Scientific classification
- Domain: Eukaryota
- Kingdom: Animalia
- Phylum: Arthropoda
- Class: †Trilobita
- Order: †Phacopida
- Family: †Encrinuridae
- Genus: †Frammia; Holtedahl, 1914

= Frammia =

Frammia Temporal range: Middle Silurian-Late Silurian ~430–425 Ma

Genus of trilobites

Frammia is a genus of trilobites in the order Phacopida that existed during the middle and upper Silurian in what is now the Arctic regions of Canada and Russia. It was described by Holtedahl in 1914, and the type species is Frammia dissimilis. That species was subsequently considered to be a synonym of Frammia arctica (Salter, 1852). The genus also contains the species, F. bachae Adrain & Edgecombe, 1997, F. hyperborea (Thomas, 1979), and F. rossica (Maksimova, 1970). The type locality is the Douro Formation of Cornwallis Island in Nunavut, Canadian Arctic.

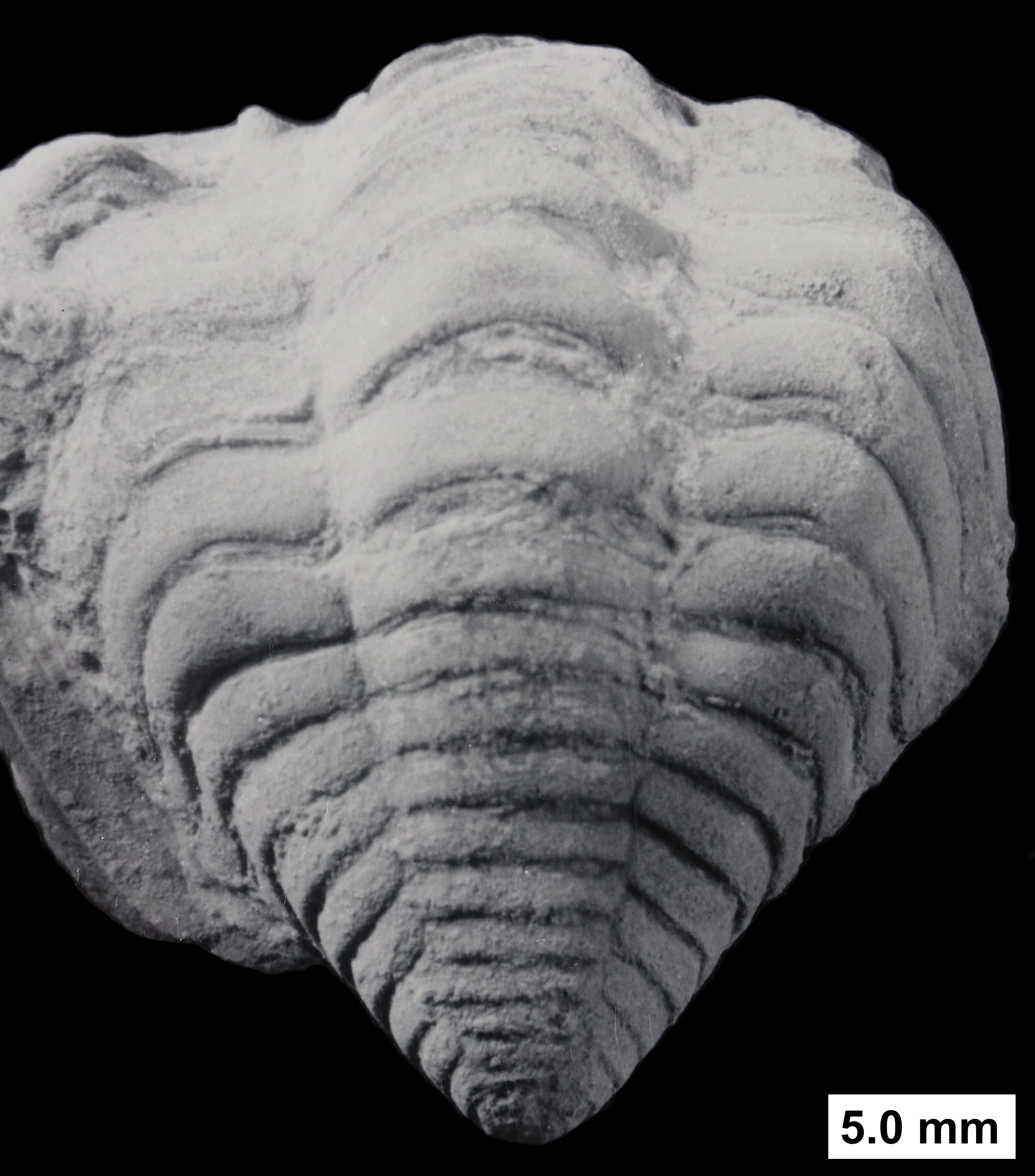
Pygidium and part of thorax of partially enrolled Frammia arctica
