= Struszia =

Scientific classification
- Kingdom: Animalia
- Phylum: Arthropoda
- Clade: †Artiopoda
- Class: †Trilobita
- Order: †Phacopida
- Family: †Encrinuridae
- Genus: †Struszia; Edgecombe, Ramsköld & Chatterton, 1993

Type species
- Struszia obtusa (Angelin, 1851) Edgecombe, Ramsköld & Chatterton, 1993

Species
- 16; see text

Extinct genus of trilobites

Struszia is a genus of fossil trilobites from the Silurian period, erected in 1993 and named after paleontologist Desmond L. Strusz.

== Species ==
The genus contains 16 species, several of them named after members of The Beatles or people connected to the band:

- Struszia concomitans (Přibyl & Vaněk, 1962)
- Struszia dimitrovi (Perry & Chatterton, 1979)
- Struszia epsteini Adrain & Edgecombe, 1997 (named after Brian Epstein)
- Struszia harrisoni Edgecombe & Chatterton, 1993 (named after George Harrison)
- Struszia hilarula (Kegel, 1927)
- Struszia indianensis (Kindle & Breger, 1904)
- Struszia martini Adrain & Edgecombe, 1997 (named after George Martin)
- Struszia mccartneyi Edgecombe & Chatterton, 1993 (named after Paul McCartney)
- Struszia obtusa (Angelin, 1851)
- Struszia onoae Adrain & Edgecombe, 1997 (named after Yoko Ono)
- Struszia petebesti Adrain & Edgecombe, 1997 (named after Pete Best)
- Struszia ramskoeldi (Edgecombe, 1990)
- Struszia rosensteinae (Tripp et al., 1977)
- Struszia subvariolaris (Münster, 1840)
- Struszia testosteron (Šnajdr, 1981)
- Struszia transiens (Barrande, 1852)

The following species were formerly in genus Struszia (subgenus Avalanchurus), but were moved out when Avalanchurus was promoted to genus status:

- Avalanchurus dakon (Šnajdr, 1983)
- Avalanchurus lennoni Edgecombe & Chatterton, 1993 (named after John Lennon)
- Avalanchurus starri Edgecombe & Chatterton, 1993 (named after Ringo Starr)

== See also ==
- List of organisms named after famous people (born 1925–1949)
