= Celtencrinurus =

Scientific classification
- Domain: Eukaryota
- Kingdom: Animalia
- Phylum: Arthropoda
- Class: †Trilobita
- Order: †Phacopida
- Family: †Encrinuridae
- Genus: †Celtencrinurus; Evitt & Tripp, 1977

Extinct genus of trilobites

Celtencrinurus is a genus of trilobites in the order Phacopida that existed during the upper Ordovician in what is now Northern Ireland. It was described by Evitt and Tripp in 1977, and the type species is Celtencrinurus multisegmentatus, which was originally described under the genus Amphion by Portlock in 1843. It was described from the Killey Bridge Formation.
