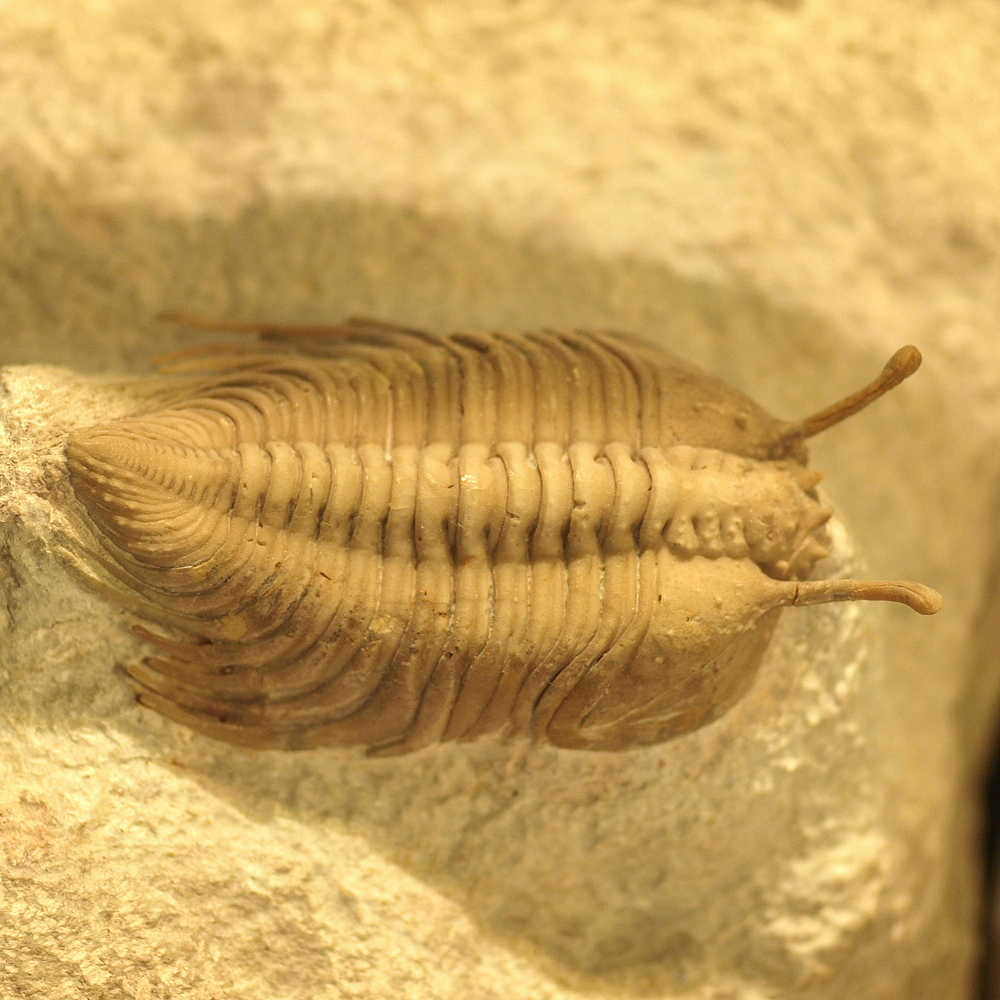
- Cybele bellatula

Scientific classification
- Domain: Eukaryota
- Kingdom: Animalia
- Phylum: Arthropoda
- Class: †Trilobita
- Order: †Phacopida
- Family: †Encrinuridae
- Genus: †Cybele; Lovén, 1846

Species
- Cybele bellatula; Cybele primus

= Cybele (trilobite) =

Genus of trilobites

Cybele is a genus of trilobites in the order Phacopida, that existed during the middle Ordovician in what is now Sweden. It was described by Loven in 1846, and the type species is Cybele bellatula, which was originally described dubiously under the genus Calymene by Dalman in 1827. The type locality was in Östergötland.
