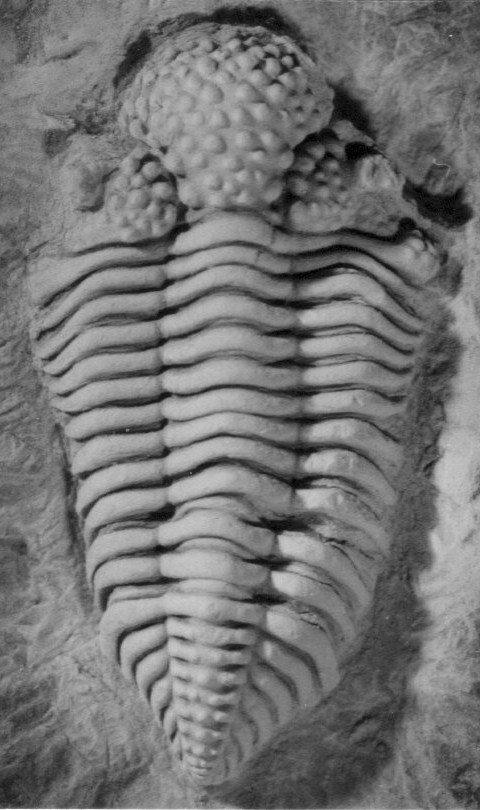
- Balizoma variolaris fossil; neotype of the type species

Scientific classification
- Domain: Eukaryota
- Kingdom: Animalia
- Phylum: Arthropoda
- Class: †Trilobita
- Order: †Phacopida
- Family: †Encrinuridae
- Genus: †Balizoma; Holloway, 1980

Species
- †B. variolaris

= Balizoma =

Balizoma Temporal range: Silurian

Genus of trilobites

Balizoma is a genus of trilobites from the family Encrinuridae established by David J. Holloway in 1980. It has only been found in rocks of Silurian age. Its type species, B. variolaris (Brongniart, 1822), is currently the only named species of the genus, and is found in England. The neotype of B. variolaris was collected from the Much Wenlock Limestone Formation at Dudley, West Midlands. That specimen was first illustrated in Sir Roderick Impey Murchison's classic book, The Silurian System. B. variolaris was the original "strawberry-headed" trilobite of Dudley, so-named because of its nodular glabellar tubercles, and well known to early trilobite collectors. Additional species were originally assigned to Balizoma, but were subsequently placed in other encrinurine genera.
