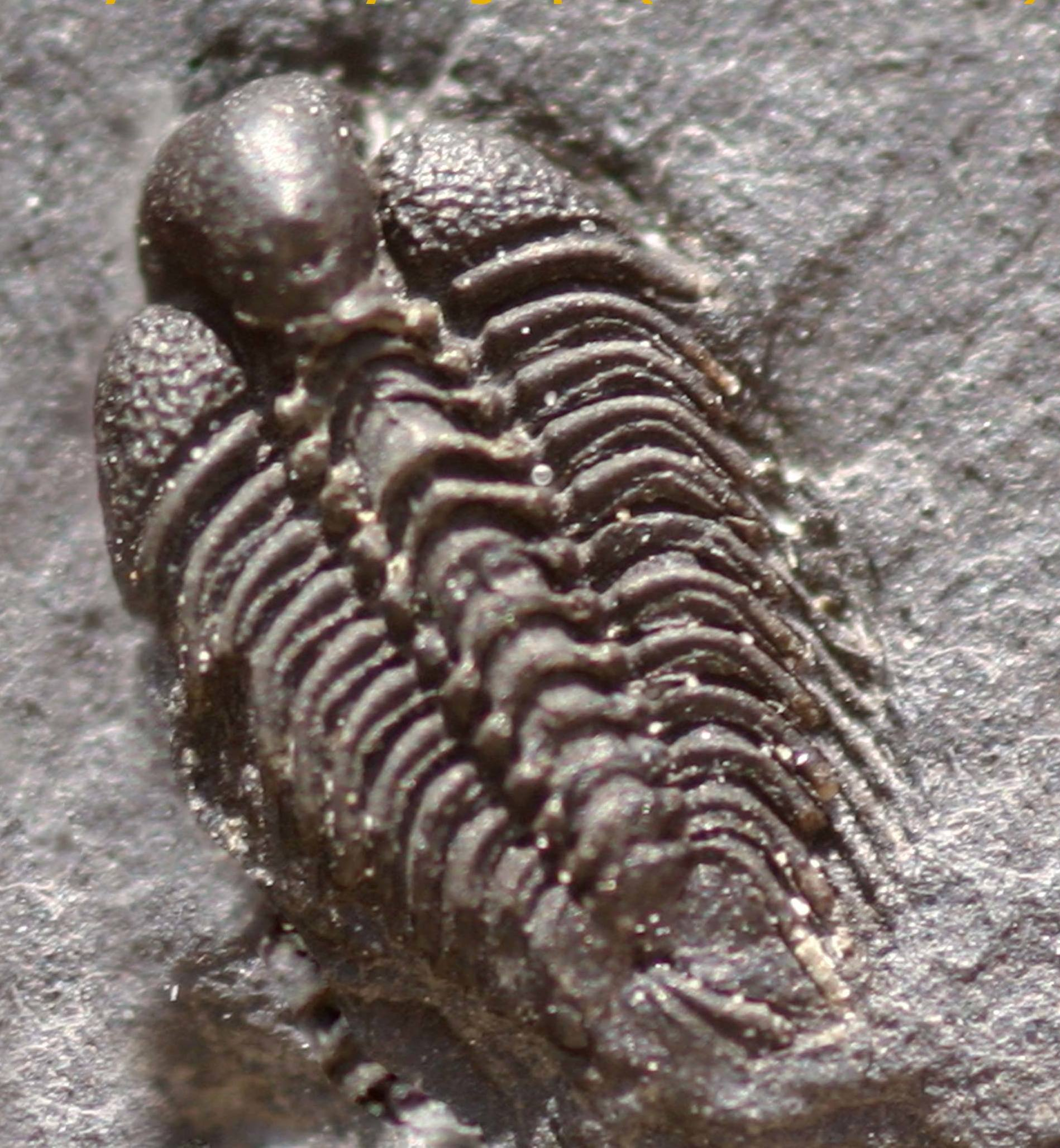

Scientific classification
- Domain: Eukaryota
- Kingdom: Animalia
- Phylum: Arthropoda
- Class: †Trilobita
- Order: †Phacopida
- Family: †Encrinuridae
- Genus: †Dindymene; Hawle & Corda, 1847

= Dindymene (trilobite) =

Dindymene Temporal range: middle Ordovician–Late Ordovician

Genus of trilobites

Dindymene is an extinct genus of trilobites in the order Phacopida. It contains two species, D. didymograpti, and D. hughesiae.
