= Magnesia on the Maeander =

Ancient Greek city in Ionia, modern Turkey

- Μαγνησία ἡ πρὸς Μαιάνδρῳ (Ancient Greek)
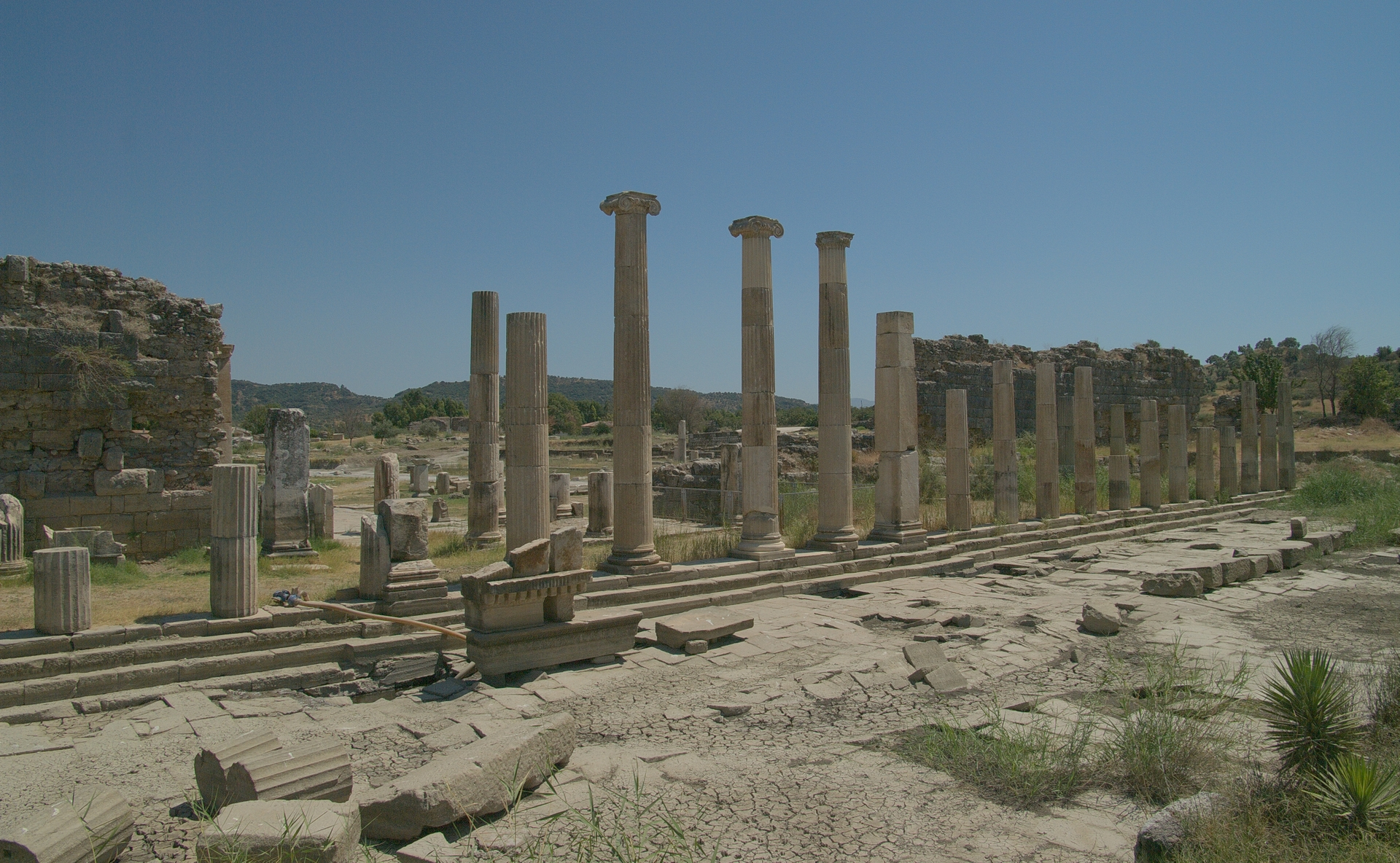
- The Propylaea of Magnesia on the Maeander

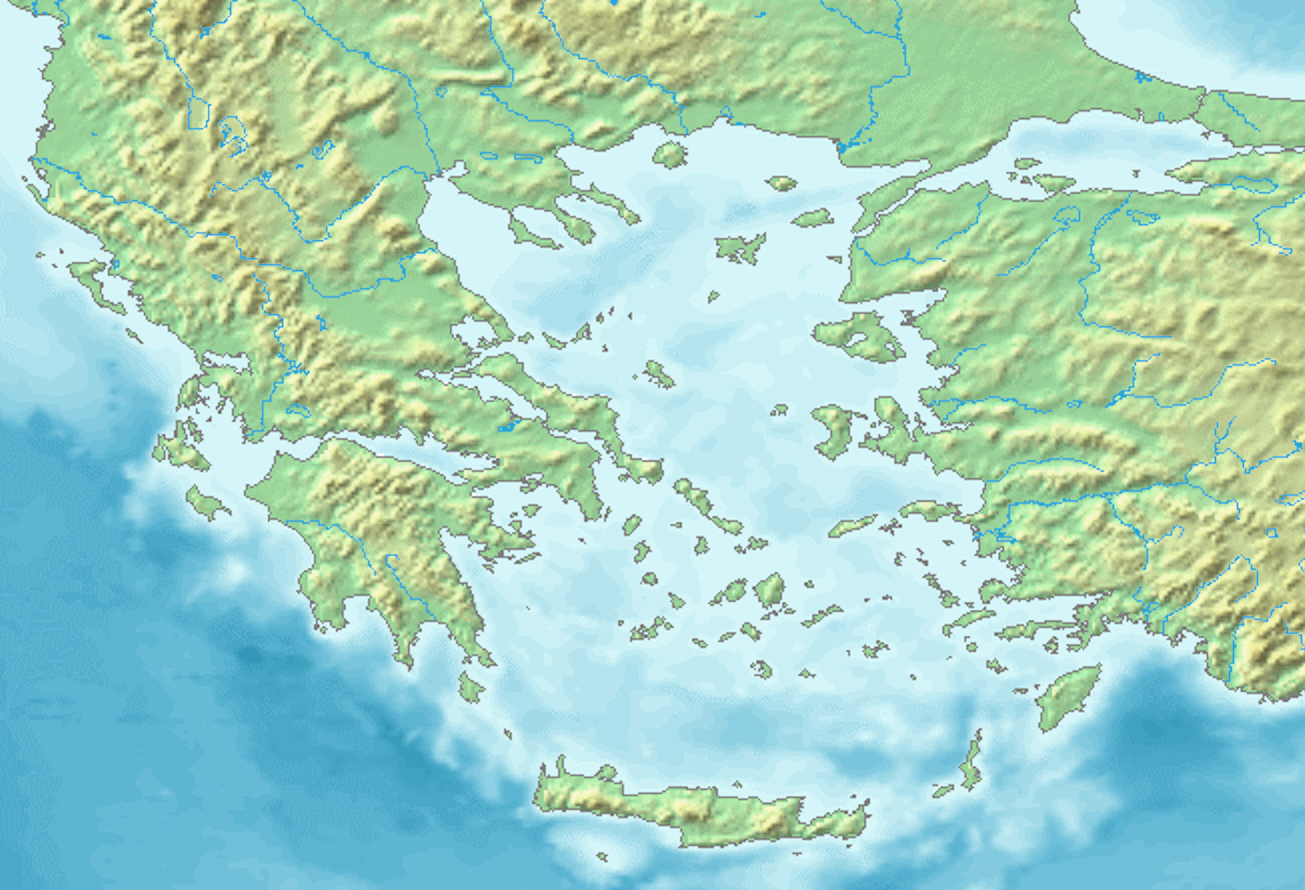
- Location within Turkey Location within Aegean Sea
- 37°51′10″N 27°31′38″E
- Type: Settlement
- Cultures: Greek, Roman
- Associated with: Bathycles of Magnesia, Themistocles, Saint Lazarus of Magnesia
- Location: Tekin, Aydın Province, Turkey
- Region: Ionia

History
- Built by: Magnetian and Cretan settlers

Site notes
- Excavation dates: 1891–1893, 1984–present
- Archaeologists: Carl Humann, Orhan Bingöl
- Condition: Ruined
- Owner: Public
- Public access: Yes

Magnesia or Magnesia on the Maeander (Ancient Greek: Μαγνησία ἡ πρὸς Μαιάνδρῳ or Μαγνησία ἡ ἐπὶ Μαιάνδρῳ; Latin: Magnesia ad Maeandrum) was an ancient Greek city in Ionia, considerable in size, at an important location commercially and strategically in the triangle of Priene, Ephesus and Tralles. The city was named Magnesia, after the Magnetes from Thessaly who settled the area along with some Cretans. It was later called "on the Meander" to distinguish it from the nearby Lydian city Magnesia ad Sipylum. It was earlier the site of Leucophrys mentioned by several ancient writers.

The territory around Magnesia was extremely fertile, and produced excellent wine, figs, and cucumbers. It was built on the slope of Mount Thorax, on the banks of the small river Lethacus, a tributary of the Maeander river upstream from Ephesus. It was 15 miles from the city of Miletus. The ruins of the city are located west of the modern village Tekin in the Germencik district of Aydın Province, Turkey.

Magnesia lay within Ionia, but because it had been settled by Aeolians from Greece, was not accepted into the Ionian League. Magnesia may have been ruled for a time by the Lydians, and was for some time under the control of the Persians and subject to Cimmerian raids. In later years, Magnesia supported the Romans during the Second Mithridatic War.

== General history ==
Magnesia quickly attained great power and prosperity, so as to be able to cope even with a challenge from Ephesus. However, the city was taken and destroyed by the Cimmerians sometime between 726 BC and 660 BC. The deserted site was soon reoccupied, and rebuilt by the Milesians or, according to Athenaeus, by the Ephesians. The Persian satraps of Lydia also occasionally resided in the city.

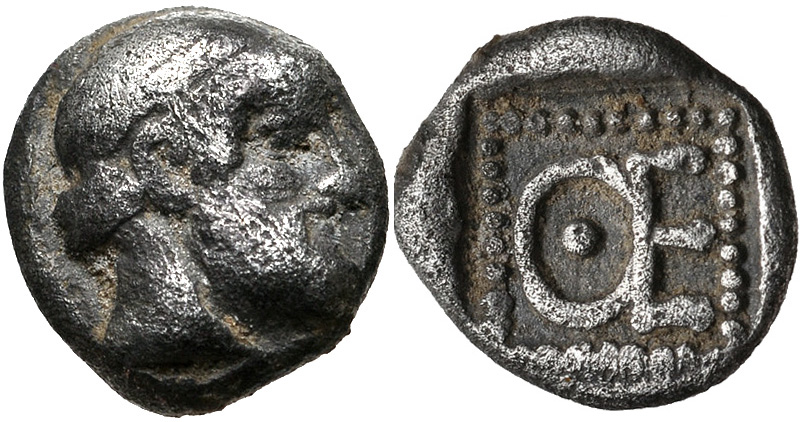
Coin of Themistocles as Governor of Magnesia. Rev: Letters ΘΕ, initials of Themistocles. Circa 465-459 BC

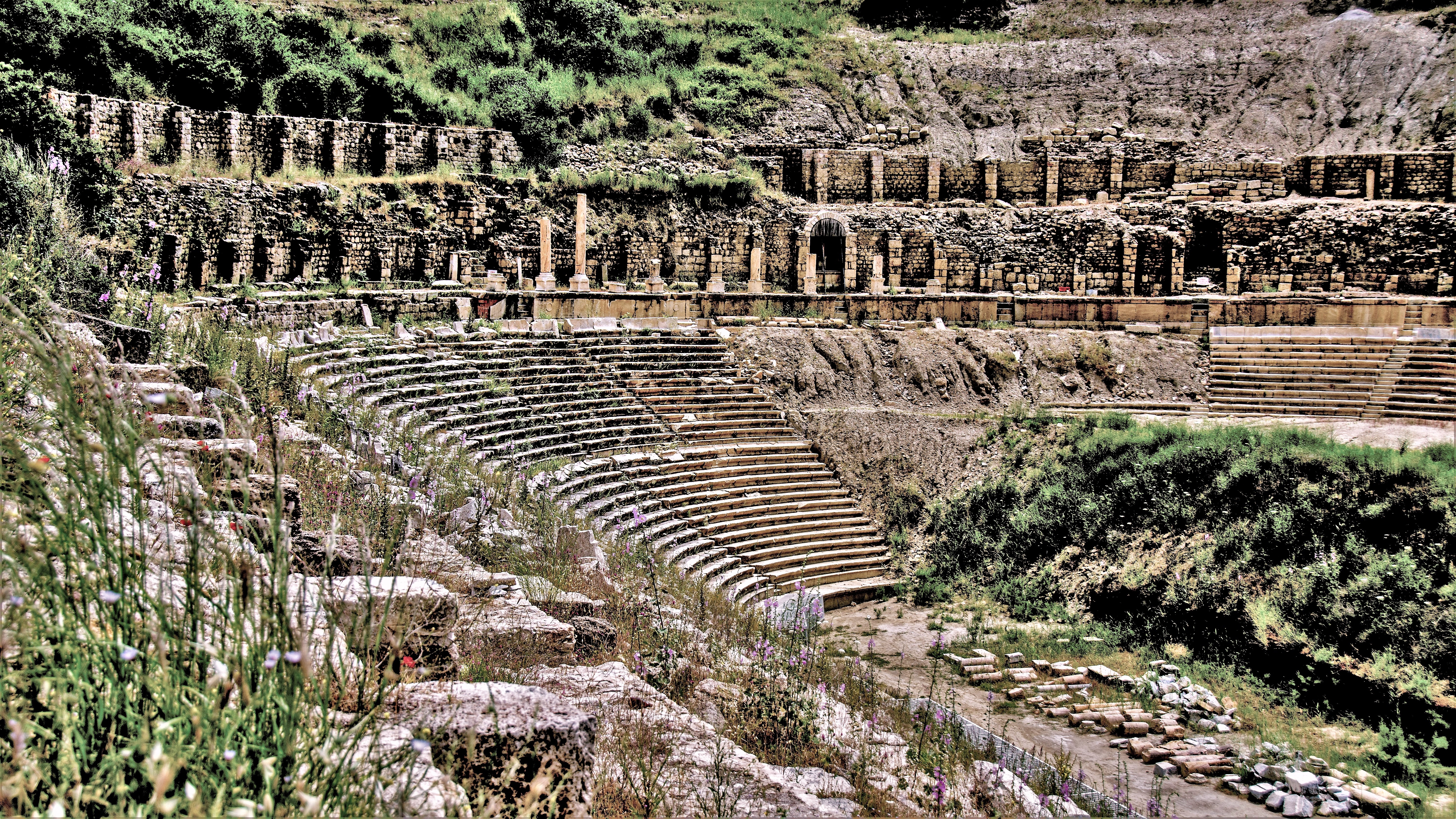
The Stadium at Magnesia, the best-preserved in the Anatolian region.

In the fifth century BC, the exiled Athenian Themistocles came to Persia to offer his services to Artaxerxes, and was given control of Magnesia to support his family.

The word "magnet" possibly derives from lodestones found around Magnesia ad Sipylum, a neighbouring city with a similar name.

In the time of the Romans, Magnesia was added to the kingdom of Pergamon, after Antiochus had been driven eastward beyond Mount Taurus. After this time the town seems to have declined and is rarely mentioned, though it is still noticed by Pliny and Tacitus. Hierocles ranks it among the bishoprics of the province of Asia, and later documents seem to imply that at one time it bore the name of Maeandropolis. The existence of the town in the time of the emperors Aurelius and Gallienus is attested to by coins.

=== Leucophryna ===
A great quadrennial festival called the Leucophryna (Λευκόφρυνα) was held in the city and people from all over the Greek world gathered there.

=== Landmarks ===
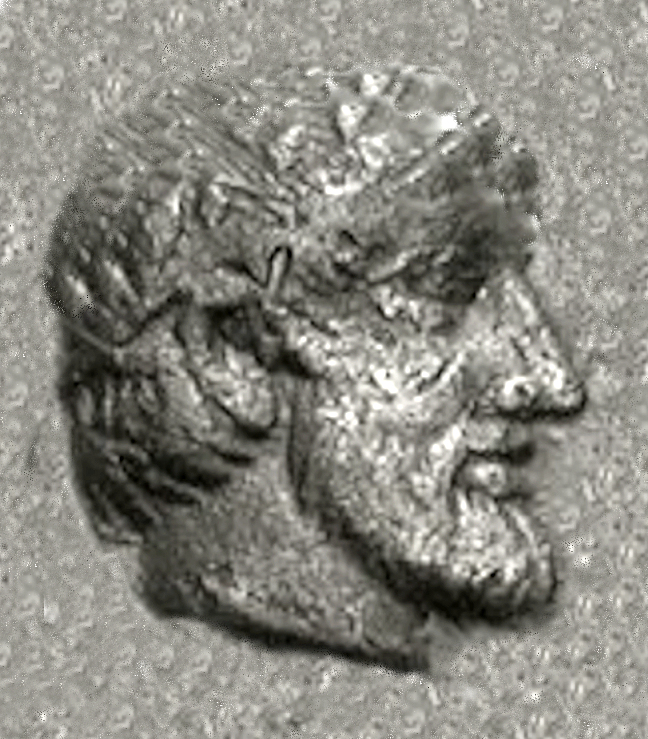
Archeptolis, son of Themistocles, ruled Magnesia circa 459-412 BC.

Magnesia contained a temple of Dindymene, the mother of the gods; the wife or daughter of Themistocles was said to have been a priestess of that divinity.

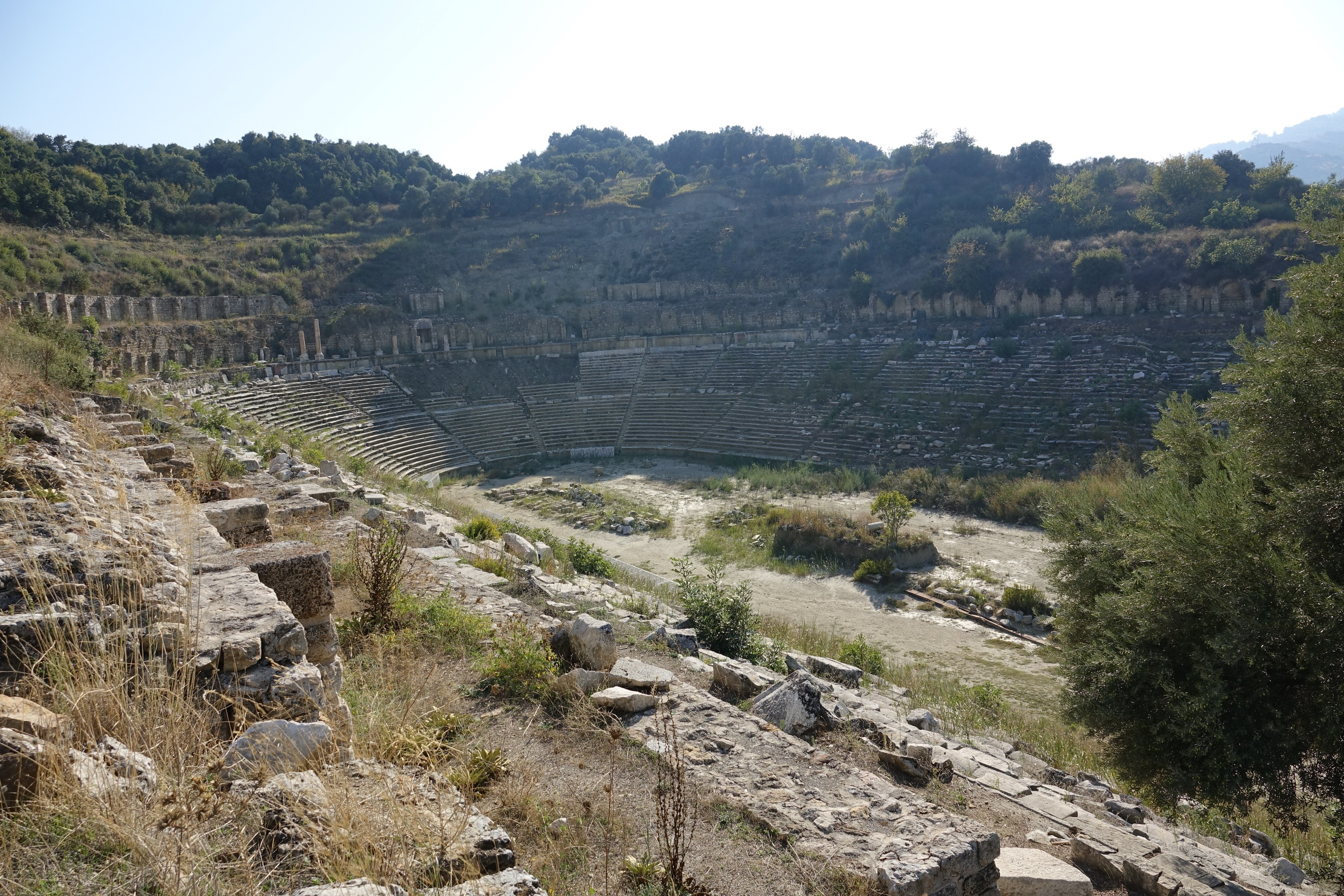
Stadium in the city

Strabo later noted the temple no longer existed, the town having been transferred to another place. The change in the site of the town alluded to by Strabo, is not noticed by other contemporary authors, however some suggest that Magnesia was moved from the banks of the Meander to a place at the foot of Mount Thorax three miles from the river.

The new town, which Strabo saw, was remarkable for its temple of Artemis Leucophryene (Ancient Greek: Ἄρτεμις Λευκοφρυηνή), which trailed behind the temple of Ephesus in size and treasure, but which exceeded the beauty of all other temples in Asia Minor:

"The first city one comes to after Ephesus is Magnesia, which is an Aeolian city . . . In the present city is the temple of Artemis Leucophryene, which in the size of its shrine and in the number of its votive offerings is inferior to the temple at Ephesus, but in the harmony and skill shown in the structure of the sacred enclosure is far superior to it. And in size it surpasses all the sacred enclosures in Asia except two, that [of Artemis] at Ephesus and that [of Apollo] at Didymi."

The temple to Artemis is said by Vitruvius to have been built by the architect Hermogenes, in the Ionic style. Following a reported theophany of the goddess Artemis in the 3rd century B.C., the temple and the city were recognised as a place of asylia by other Greek states.

The temples of the city would have been closed during the persecution of pagans in the late Roman Empire and little remains of either temple today. The site of Magnesia on the Maeander was once identified with the modern Güzelhisar; since then the ruins of a temple to Artemis were found at Inck-bazar, and the latter is considered a more likely site.

A further important monument in Magnesia was the stadium in the south-western part of the city with a length of 185,90 meters.

== Modern excavations ==
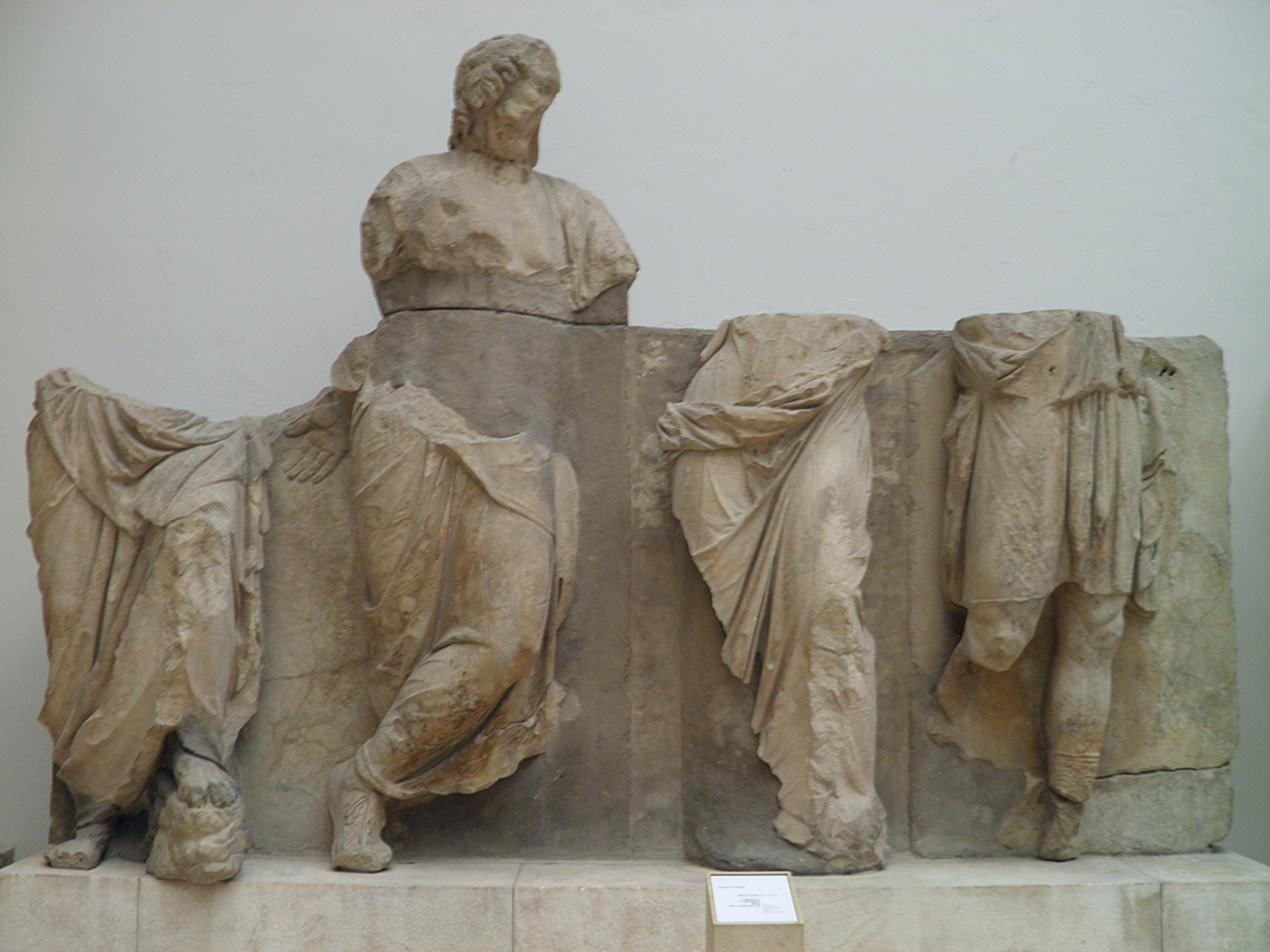
Fragment of relief from the Altar of Temple of Artemis at Magnesia on the Maeander, end of 3rd century BC, Pergamon Museum Berlin.

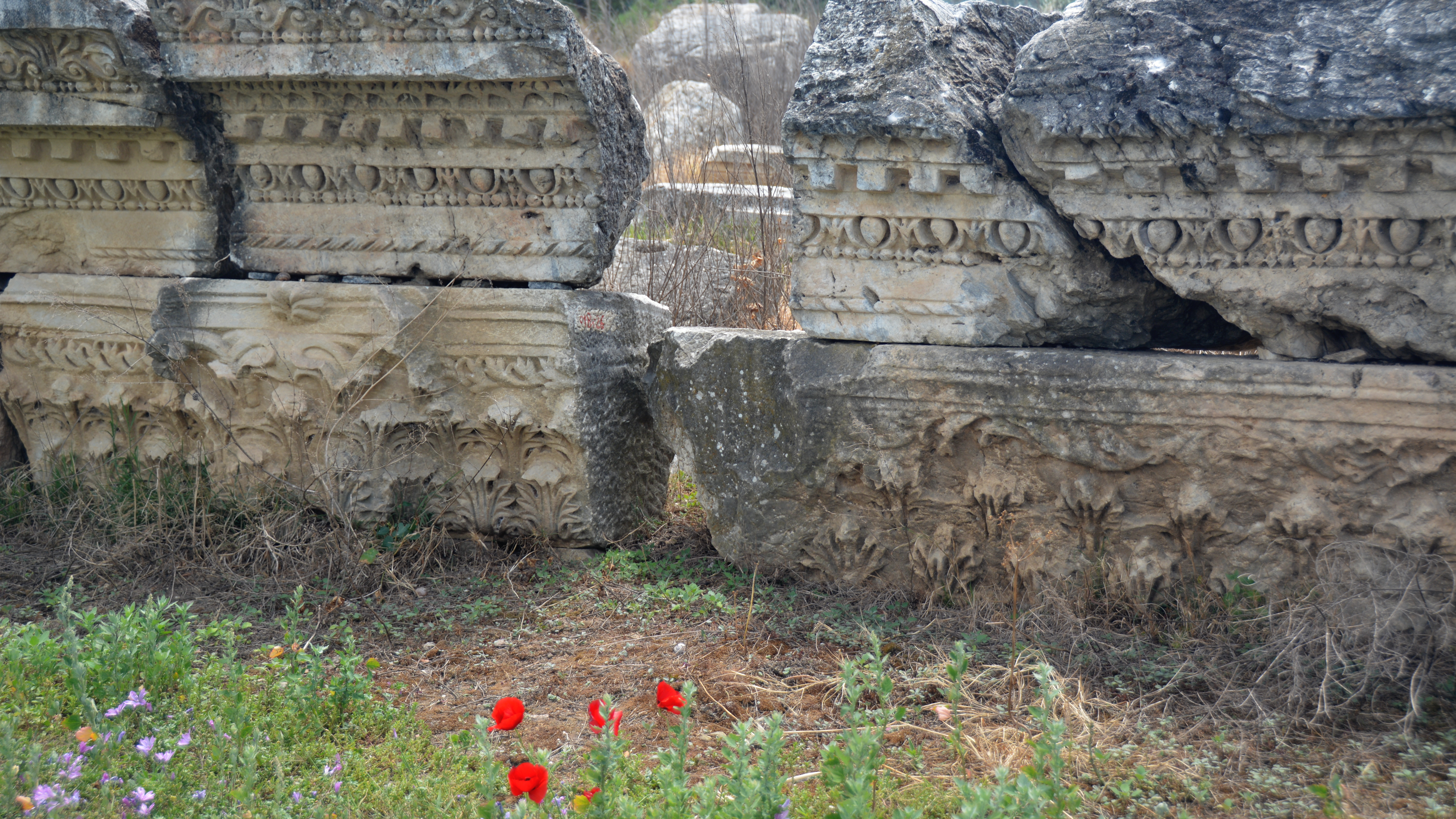
Sculptural remains at Magnesia.

The first excavations at the archaeological site were performed during 1891 and 1893 by a German archaeological team conducted by Carl Humann, discoverer of the Pergamon Altar. These lasted 21 months and partially revealed the theatre, the Artemis temple, the agora, the Zeus temple and the prytaneion. Excavations were resumed at the site, after an interval of almost 100 years, in 1984, by Orhan Bingöl of the University of Ankara and the Turkish Ministry of Culture.

Findings from the site are now displayed in Istanbul and Aydın, as well as in Berlin and Paris. Copies of the portico (pronaos) of the Zeus temple and of a bay of the Artemis temple can be visited in the Pergamonmuseum in Berlin. Much of the architectural remains of Magnesia were destroyed long ago by local lime burners. The well preserved remains of the Zeus temple have been destroyed by local residents even after Humann's excavation campaign.

In July 2018, six Greek statues were discovered. Four female, one male and one with unknown gender were unearthed in the ruins of a temple of Artemis.

== Notable people ==
- Bathycles (6th century BC) Greek sculptor
- Themistocles of Athens spent his final years and was buried here
- Protophanes (Πρωτοφάνης) ancient victor of both wrestling and Pankration
- Alciphron (Ἀλκίφρων), Greek philosopher
- Saint Charalampos of Magnesia

== Sources ==
- Carl Humann: Magnesia am Maeander. Bericht über die Ergebnisse der Ausgrabungen der Jahre 1891–1893. Berlin: Reimer, 1904
- Volker Kästner: Der Tempel des Zeus Sosipolis von Magnesia am Mäander, in: Brigitte Knittlmayer and Wolf-Dieter Heilmeyer: Die Antikensammlung, Mainz: Philipp von Zabern, 1998, p. 230-231
- Johannes Althoff: Ein Meister des Verwirklichens. Der Archäologe Theodor Wiegand, in: Peter Behrens, Theodor Wiegand und die Villa in Dahlem. Klaus Rheidt and Barbara A. Lutz (ed.), Mainz: Philipp von Zabern, 2004, p. 151

== Literary references ==
- Magnesia on the Maeander is the location for the historical mystery novel The Ionia Sanction, by Gary Corby, set during the last days of Themistocles.

== See also ==
- List of ancient Greek cities
