= Sossianus Hierocles =

Late 3rd/early 4th century Roman aristocrat and official

Sossianus Hierocles (fl. 303 AD) was a late Roman aristocrat and office-holder. He served as a praeses in Syria under Diocletian at some time in the 290s. He was then made vicarius of some district, perhaps Oriens (the East, including Syria, Palestine, and, at the time, Egypt) until 303, when he was transferred to Bithynia. It is for his anti-Christian activities in Bithynia that he is principally remembered. He was, in the words of the Cambridge Ancient History, "one of the most zealous of persecutors". While in Bithynia, Hierocles authored Lover of Truth (Greek: Φιλαλήθης, Philalethes; also known as Φιλαλήθης λόγος, Philalethes logos), a critique of Christianity. Lover of Truth is noted as the first instance of the trope, popular in later pagan polemic, of comparing the pagan holy man Apollonius of Tyana to Jesus Christ.

Hierocles was among the campaigners for a stronger policy against Christians present at Diocletian's court through the early 4th century. The campaigners' aims were as realized in February 303 with the edicts of the Great Persecution, which expelled Christians from government service, deprived them of normal legal rights, and left them open to imprisonment and execution if they did not comply with traditional religious rites. Hierocles was an avid enforcer of these edicts in his function as praeses of Bithynia, and again while serving as praefectus Aegypti during the late 300s or early 310s. It is largely through incidental notes in the Christian author Lactantius' On the Deaths of the Persecutors and Divine Institutes and Eusebius of Caesarea's On the Martyrs of Palestine and Against Hierocles that we are aware of his activities. Inscriptions at Palmyra preserve the details of his early career.

== Career ==
Hierocles was a praeses at some time between 293 and 303. The Prosopography of the Later Roman Empire (PLRE) states that, as praeses, he governed Phoenice Libanensis, the province on the eastern side of Mount Lebanon. The district included Palmyra, where the inscription attesting to Hierocles' career is located. Hierocles was the vicarius of some district (which Simmons and Barnes identify as Oriens) before 303; in that year he was made praeses of Bithynia. Although an apparent demotion (praeses was a lower rank than vicarius, with fewer responsibilities and less prestige), the move brought Hierocles closer to the imperial court, and the real seat of power: the emperor.

Hierocles was later made praefectus Aegypti. He is attested as such by a papyrus from Karanis (Papyri Cairo Isiodrus 69 = Sammelbuch griechischer Urkunden aus Aegypten 9186 Karanis). However, while the papyrus's date is clear (January), its year is not. It has been identified as either 307 or 310/11; most experts take the later date, though the PLRE takes the former. Eusebius, in the Martyrs of Palestine, gives a similarly ambiguous date: after describing the martyrdom of Apphianus (2 April 306), Eusebius moves to the martyrdom of Apphianus' brother Adesius, who, "a little later", assaulted the prefect Hierocles in Alexandria and was executed. Nor do the existing lists of Egyptian prefects allow further precision: the fasti have gaps between Clodius Culcianus on 29 May 306 (Papyri Oxyrhynchus 1104) and Valerius Victorinus in 308 (Papyri Oxyrhynchus 2674) as well as between Aelius Hyginus 22 June 309 (Papyri Oxyrhynchus 2667) and Aurelius Ammonius on 18 August 312 (Chrestomathie 2.64). Timothy Barnes argues that the balance of probabilities favors the 310/311 date, as it would be consistent with what is known of Maximinus' actions elsewhere in the same period. In Palestine, in 308, he replaced the governor there with another, firmer supporter of his program of persecution.

== Eusebius of Caesarea's Against Hierocles ==
Eusebius of Caesarea (c. 263–339) wrote a book titled Against Hierocles (Contra Hieroclem) at some time in the early 4th century. Its date is disputed. Adolf von Harnack, writing early in the 20th century, argued that it should be dated to before 303, since it does not contain any reference to the persecution that began in that year. As it would have strengthened his argument if it had, this makes a later date unlikely. Ernst Schwartz, however, writing at about the same time, believed that Against Hierocles contained a reference to the death of Galerius, which happened in April or May 311. Schwartz consequently dated the work to between that event and the death of Maximinus in summer 313. J. Stevenson, in his Studies in Eusebius (1929), argued for a date of 306/07, on the grounds that Eusebius appears to refer to Hierocles as prefect of Egypt. His dating proved less popular in the literature than the dates of Harnack and Schwartz. Most mid-20th century scholars followed Schwartz.

In 1976, Barnes, in a restatement and expansion of Harnack's arguments, contested Schwartz' dating. Barnes found the 311–13 dating difficult to countenance given what else is known about Eusebius' literary history at this period—namely, that he wrote his Preparation for the Gospel (in fifteen books) and his Demonstration of the Gospel (in twenty) in or soon after 313. Not only was this an expansive literary project, it was also, Barnes argued, a project far removed in tone and substance from Against Hierocles. Moreover, it seems to betray an advance in Eusebius' knowledge: whereas in Hierocles Eusebius states that Hierocles' comparison of Jesus to Apollonius of Tyana is his sole act of originality ("of all the writers, who have ever attacked us, [he] stands alone in selecting Apollonius, as he has recently done, for the purposes of comparison and contrast with our Saviour" p. 370.9–12), in the Preparation, Eusebius makes extensive reference to Porphyry of Tyre's Against the Christians, which used the same trope. Eusebius is also known to have written a work titled Against Porphyry in twenty-five books (it does not survive), which must fit somewhere into this timeline.

Barnes disputes the validity of Schwartz's claim that Eusebius refers to the death of Galerius. The passage cited (p. 372.15–23 Kayser) could refer to Decius or Valerian. The latter is also a clear candidate for the event Eusebius describes as Christ's "easily overcoming those who on occasion attacked his divine teaching", and the "infidels who persecuted him bitterly" described in the passage: Valerian's persecution was cut short when he was captured and killed during a war with Persia in 260. His death inaugurated four decades of religious peace, during which no imperial official took action against Christians.

== Possible mention in Lactantius ==
The unnamed individual mentioned by Lactantius who accused Jesus of having gathered a band of brigands may have been Sossianus Hierocles. According to Lactantius the individual accused Jesus of having a band of 900 brigands, and for this reason was crucified.

== See also ==
- Macarius Magnes — his work Apocriticus is thought to have been written as a reply to Hierocles' Lover of Truth.
