= Atractopyge =

Atractopyge Temporal range: middle Ordovician–early Devonian

Scientific classification
- Domain: Eukaryota
- Kingdom: Animalia
- Phylum: Arthropoda
- Class: †Trilobita
- Order: †Phacopida
- Family: †Encrinuridae
- Genus: †Atractopyge; Hawle and Corda, 1847

Species
- A. aspera (Linnarsson, 1869) synonym Cybele aspera; A. belgica Lesperance, 1987; A. brevicauda (Angelin, 1854); A. celtica Dean, 1965; A. condylosa Dean, 1971; A. confusa Owen, 1981; A. dalmani Owen & Tripp, 1988; A. dentata (Esmark, 1833); A. errans Öpik, 1937; A. gaoluoensis T-M Zhou; A. gracilis Nikolaisen 1961; A. killochanensis Tripp, 1954; A. kutorgae (Schmidt, 1881); A. laerensis Kreuger, 2004; A. lata Ji, 1986; A. lui Xiang & Ji, 1987; A. michelli (Reed, 1914) synonym Cybele michelli; A. pauli Mannil, 1958; A. petiolulata Tripp, 1976; A. progemma Owen, 1981; A. revaliensis (Schmidt, 1881); A. rex (Nieszkowski, 1857); A. scabra Dean, 1962; A. sedgwicki MacGregor, 1963; A. sellinensis Krueger, 2003; A. sinensis Lu, 1975; A. vardiana Mannil, 1958; A. veneficus Lesperance & Tripp, 1985; A. verrucosa (Dalman, 1827); A. williamsi MacGregor, 1963; A. woerthi (Eichwald, 1840); A. xianquanensis Zhang, 1983; A. xipheres (Öpik, 1925)

Extinct genus of trilobites

Atractopyge is a genus of trilobites that lived in what would be Asia and Europe from the middle Ordovician to the early Devonian from 472 to 412.3 mya, existing for approximately 59.7 million years.

== Taxonomy ==
Atractopyge was named by Hawle and Corda (1847). Jell and Adrain (2003) list it as a currently valid genus name within the Phacopida, specifically within the Encrinuridae.

== Fossil distribution ==
Fossil distribution is confined to the strata of the Early Llanvirn to Rawtheyan ages. Fossils have been recovered from Yunnan Province, China to the Stinchar River, United Kingdom to Ringerike, Norway.

== History ==
A cranidium of Atractopyge was already illustrated by the Welsh scientist Edward Lhuyd in 1698.

The species xipheres is commonly referenced as A. Xipheres (Öpik, 1937), particularly on commercial websites. However, Öpik first described the species in 1925 as Cybele xiphere (Öpik, 1925, pp. 11, fig. 1: 10, 11) and later (1937, pp. 121, fig. VII 3; XXI 3, 4) described the species as Cybele (Atractopyge) xipheres sp. nov.
