= Maeandropolis =

Former populated places in Turkey

Coordinates: 37°45′07″N 27°24′37″E

Maeandropolis or Maiandroupolis (Ancient Greek: Μαιανδρούπολις), also known as Maeandrus or Maiandros (Μαίανδρος), was a town of ancient Ionia in the territory of Magnesia on the Maeander. Its name reflects association with the Maeander River, on which it was situated. It was a member of the Delian League.

Its site is tentatively located near Söke, Aydın Province, Turkey.
