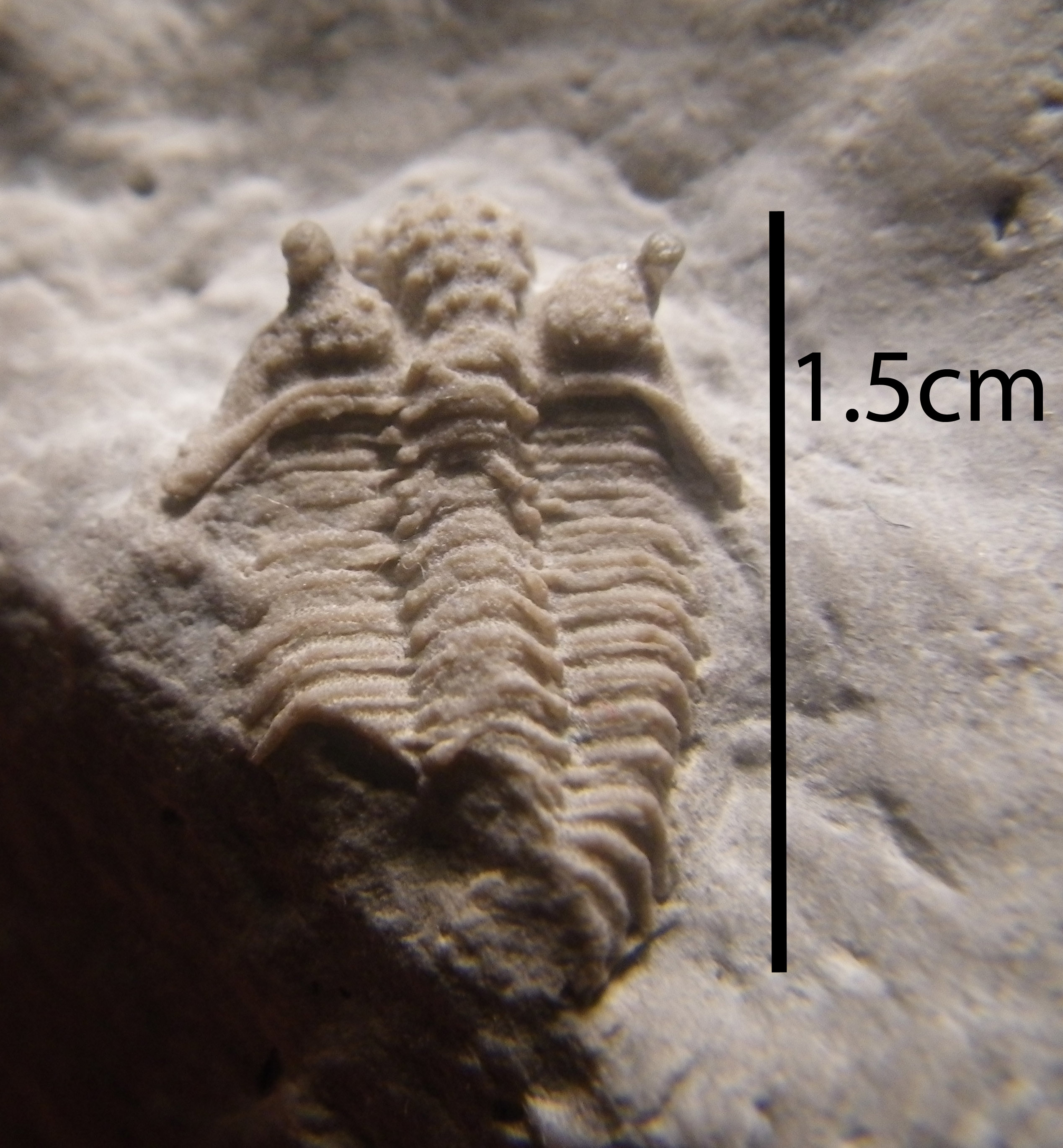
- Fossil of Encrinurus egani from the Racine Dolomite

Scientific classification
- Kingdom: Animalia
- Phylum: Arthropoda
- Clade: †Artiopoda
- Class: †Trilobita
- Order: †Phacopida
- Suborder: †Cheirurina
- Family: †Encrinuridae; Angelin, 1854

= Encrinuridae =

Encrinuridae Temporal range: Middle Ordovician–Early Devonian

Extinct family of trilobites

Encrinuridae is a family of trilobite within the order Phacopida that lived in what would be Africa, Asia, Australia, Europe, North America, and South America from the middle Ordovician to the early Devonian from 479 to 412.3 million years ago, existing for approximately 66.7 million years.

== Taxonomy ==
Encrinuridae was named by Angelin (1854). It was assigned to Phacopida by Gregory Edgecombe (1994). It contains the following genera:

- †Aegrotocatellus
- †Alwynulus
- †Atractocybeloides
- †Atractopyge
- †Avalanchurus
- †Balizoma
- †Batocara
- †Bevanopsis
- †Billevittia
- †Brianurus
- †Celtencrinurus
- †Coronaspis
- †Coronocephalus
- †Cromus
- †Curriella
- †Cybele
- †Cybeloides
- †Cybelurus
- †Dayongia
- †Deacybele
- †Dindymene
- †Distyrax
- †Dnestrovites
- †Elsarella
- †Encrinuroides
- †Encrinurus
- †Eodindymene
- †Erratencrinurus
- †Fragiscutum
- †Frammia
- †Frencrinuroides
- †Johntempleia
- †Kailia
- †Koksorenus
- †Langgonia
- †Lasaguaditas
- †Libertella
- †Lyrapyge
- †Mackenziurus
- †Mitchellaspis
- †Nucleurus
- †Oedicybele
- †Paracybeloides
- †Paraencrinurus
- †Parakailia
- †Perirehaedulus
- †Perryus
- †Physemataspis
- †Plasiaspis
- †Prophysemataspis
- †Prostrix
- †Rielaspis
- †Rongxiella
- †Sinocybele
- †Staurocephalus
- †Stiktocybele
- †Struszia
- †Tewonia
- †Walencrinuroides
- †Wallacia

== Fossil distribution ==
Fossils were found in strata dating from the Arenig to Lochkovian ages. Locations were varied and stretched from Florentine Valley, Tasmania to Xinjiang Province, China to Will County, Illinois.

== Sources ==
- Fossils (Smithsonian Handbooks) by David Ward
- Trilobites by Riccardo Levi-Setti
- Invertebrate Palaeontology and Evolution by E.N.K. Clarkson
- Trilobites: Common Trilobites of North America (A NatureGuide book) by Jasper Burns
