= Eclipta (beetle) =

Scientific classification
- Kingdom: Animalia
- Phylum: Arthropoda
- Clade: Pancrustacea
- Class: Insecta
- Order: Coleoptera
- Suborder: Polyphaga
- Infraorder: Cucujiformia
- Family: Cerambycidae
- Subfamily: Cerambycinae
- Tribe: Rhinotragini
- Genus: Eclipta; Bates, 1873

Genus of beetles

Eclipta is a genus of beetles in the family Cerambycidae, containing the following species:

- Eclipta aberlenci (Tavakilian & Peñaherrera-Leiva, 2005)
- Eclipta aegrota (Bates, 1872)
- Eclipta amabilis (Melzer, 1934)
- Eclipta amanoaphila (Penaherrera-Leiva & Tavakilian, 2003)
- Eclipta anoguttata (Bates, 1873)
- Eclipta astrigae (Tavakilian & Penaherrera-Leiva, 2003)
- Eclipta atripes (Fisher, 1952)
- Eclipta bauhiniae (Penaherrera-Leiva & Tavakilian, 2004)
- Eclipta bilineaticollis (Zajciw, 1965)
- Eclipta bipunctata (Melzer, 1934)
- Eclipta bistriaticollis (Zajciw, 1965)
- Eclipta bivittata (Fuchs, 1961)
- Eclipta bivitticollis (Fisher, 1952)
- Eclipta brachialis (Bates, 1873)
- Eclipta brasiliensis (Fisher, 1947)
- Eclipta brevipennis (Melzer, 1934)
- Eclipta castanea (Bates, 1873)
- Eclipta championella (Bates, 1880)
- Eclipta collarti (Fuchs, 1959)
- Eclipta costipennis (Giesbert, 1991)
- Eclipta cribripennis (Bates, 1873)
- Eclipta curtipennis (Zajciw, 1966)
- Eclipta cyanea (Bates, 1885)
- Eclipta discolor (Gounelle, 1911)
- Eclipta eirene (Newman, 1841)
- Eclipta eperuaphila (Tavakilian & Peñaherrera-Leiva, 2005)
- Eclipta erythrodera (Bates, 1873)
- Eclipta fanchonae (Tavakilian & Penaherrera-Leiva, 2003)
- Eclipta faurei (Penaherrera-Leiva & Tavakilian, 2003)
- Eclipta flavicollis (Bates, 1873)
- Eclipta fritschei (Gounelle, 1913)
- Eclipta giuglarisi (Penaherrera-Leiva & Tavakilian, 2004)
- Eclipta gracilis (Fisher, 1952)
- Eclipta guianensis (Penaherrera-Leiva & Tavakilian, 2004)
- Eclipta igniventris (Giesbert, 1991)
- Eclipta lanuginosa (Bates, 1873)
- Eclipta lateralis (Fisher, 1952)
- Eclipta lauraceae (Penaherrera-Leiva & Tavakilian, 2004)
- Eclipta liturifera (Bates, 1873)
- Eclipta malacodermoides (Penaherrera-Leiva & Tavakilian, 2003)
- Eclipta malthinoides (Bates, 1870)
- Eclipta melzeri (Zajciw, 1967)
- Eclipta migueli Santos-Silva & Biffi, 2026
- Eclipta minuens (Giesbert, 1991)
- Eclipta monnei Da Silva, Monne, Santos-Silva & Rafael, 2026
- Eclipta monteverdensis (Giesbert, 1991)
- Eclipta nais (Gounelle, 1911)
- Eclipta nigriventris (Melzer, 1934)
- Eclipta notaticollis (Gounelle, 1911)
- Eclipta notatipes (Tavakilian & Peñaherrera-Leiva, 2005)
- Eclipta pallidicornis (Zajciw, 1966)
- Eclipta perplexa (Gounelle, 1911)
- Eclipta picturata (Gounelle, 1911)
- Eclipta prolixa (Bates, 1873)
- Eclipta pseudoruficollis (Tavakilian & Peñaherrera-Leiva, 2005)
- Eclipta quadrispinosa (Gounelle, 1913)
- Eclipta ramulicola (Gounelle, 1911)
- Eclipta romani (Aurivillius, 1919)
- Eclipta ruficollis (Bates, 1870)
- Eclipta sallaei (Bates, 1885)
- Eclipta seabrai (Zajciw, 1960)
- Eclipta semiflammea (Gounelle, 1911)
- Eclipta seminigra (Gounelle, 1911)
- Eclipta signaticollis (Melzer, 1922)
- Eclipta socia (Melzer, 1934)
- Eclipta subcastanea (Zajciw, 1966)
- Eclipta taraleaphila (Tavakilian & Penaherrera-Leiva, 2003)
- Eclipta thoracica Bates, 1873
- Eclipta transversemaculata (Tavakilian & Peñaherrera-Leiva, 2005)
- Eclipta vasconezi (Penaherrera-Leiva & Tavakilian, 2004)
- Eclipta vicina (Melzer, 1927)
- Eclipta vitticollis (Bates, 1873)

== Selected former species ==
- Eclipta eunomia (Newman, 1841)
- Eclipta pilosipes (Penaherrera-Leiva & Tavakilian, 2004)
