= Ecliptoides rouperti =

Scientific classification
- Domain: Eukaryota
- Kingdom: Animalia
- Phylum: Arthropoda
- Class: Insecta
- Order: Coleoptera
- Suborder: Polyphaga
- Infraorder: Cucujiformia
- Family: Cerambycidae
- Genus: Ecliptoides
- Species: E. rouperti

Binomial name
- Ecliptoides rouperti (Tavakilian & Peñaherrera-Leiva, 2005)

Synonyms
- Ommata rouperti Tavakilian & Peñaherrera, 2005 (Tavakilian & Peñaherrera, 2007)

Species of beetle

Ecliptoides rouperti is a species of beetle in the family Cerambycidae. It was described by Tavakilian and Peñaherrera-Leiva in 2005.
