= Eclipta bistriaticollis =

Scientific classification
- Kingdom: Animalia
- Phylum: Arthropoda
- Class: Insecta
- Order: Coleoptera
- Suborder: Polyphaga
- Infraorder: Cucujiformia
- Family: Cerambycidae
- Genus: Eclipta
- Species: E. bistriaticollis

Binomial name
- Eclipta bistriaticollis (Zajciw, 1965)

Species of beetle

Eclipta bistriaticollis is a species of beetle in the family Cerambycidae. It was described by Zajciw in 1965.
