= Eclipta bivitticollis =

Scientific classification
- Kingdom: Animalia
- Phylum: Arthropoda
- Class: Insecta
- Order: Coleoptera
- Suborder: Polyphaga
- Infraorder: Cucujiformia
- Family: Cerambycidae
- Genus: Eclipta
- Species: E. bivitticollis

Binomial name
- Eclipta bivitticollis (Fisher, 1952)

Species of beetle

Eclipta bivitticollis is a species of beetle in the family Cerambycidae. It was described by Fisher in 1952.
