= Eclipta pallidicornis =

Scientific classification
- Kingdom: Animalia
- Phylum: Arthropoda
- Class: Insecta
- Order: Coleoptera
- Suborder: Polyphaga
- Infraorder: Cucujiformia
- Family: Cerambycidae
- Genus: Eclipta
- Species: E. pallidicornis

Binomial name
- Eclipta pallidicornis (Zajciw, 1966)

Species of beetle

Eclipta pallidicornis is a species of beetle in the family Cerambycidae. It was described by Zajciw in 1966.
