= Eclipta notaticollis =

Scientific classification
- Kingdom: Animalia
- Phylum: Arthropoda
- Class: Insecta
- Order: Coleoptera
- Suborder: Polyphaga
- Infraorder: Cucujiformia
- Family: Cerambycidae
- Genus: Eclipta
- Species: E. notaticollis

Binomial name
- Eclipta notaticollis (Gounelle, 1911)

Species of beetle

Eclipta notaticollis is a species of beetle in the family Cerambycidae. It was described by Gounelle in 1911.
