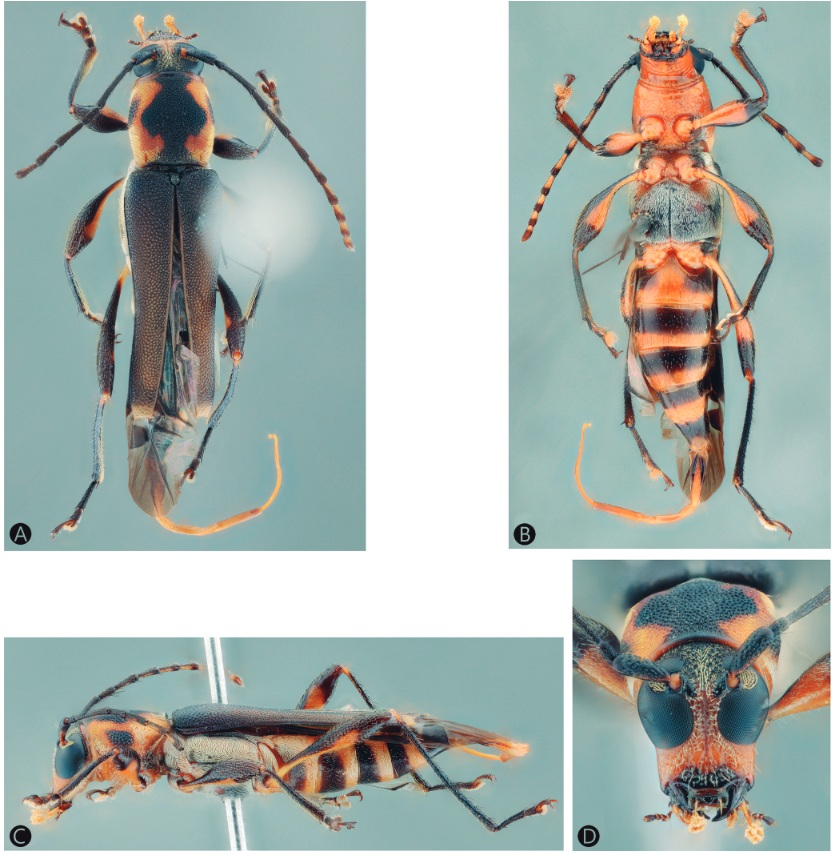

Scientific classification
- Kingdom: Animalia
- Phylum: Arthropoda
- Clade: Pancrustacea
- Class: Insecta
- Order: Coleoptera
- Suborder: Polyphaga
- Infraorder: Cucujiformia
- Family: Cerambycidae
- Genus: Eclipta
- Species: E. taraleaphila

Binomial name
- Eclipta taraleaphila (Penaherrera-Leiva & Tavakilian, 2003)

Synonyms
- Ommata (Eclipta) taraleaphila Tavakilian & Peñaherrera‑Leiva, 2003

= Eclipta taraleaphila =

Species of beetle

Eclipta taraleaphila is a species of beetle in the family Cerambycidae. It was described by Penaherrera-Leiva and Tavakilian in 2003. It is found in French Guiana and Brazil (Amazonas).
