= Eclipta eirene =

Scientific classification
- Kingdom: Animalia
- Phylum: Arthropoda
- Class: Insecta
- Order: Coleoptera
- Suborder: Polyphaga
- Infraorder: Cucujiformia
- Family: Cerambycidae
- Genus: Eclipta
- Species: E. eirene

Binomial name
- Eclipta eirene (Newman, 1841)

Species of beetle

Eclipta eirene is a species of beetle in the family Cerambycidae. It was described by Newman in 1841.
