= Eclipta brasiliensis =

Scientific classification
- Kingdom: Animalia
- Phylum: Arthropoda
- Class: Insecta
- Order: Coleoptera
- Suborder: Polyphaga
- Infraorder: Cucujiformia
- Family: Cerambycidae
- Genus: Eclipta
- Species: E. brasiliensis

Binomial name
- Eclipta brasiliensis (Fisher, 1947)

Species of beetle

Eclipta brasiliensis is a species of beetle in the family Cerambycidae. It was described by Fisher in 1947.
