= Eclipta fanchonae =

Scientific classification
- Kingdom: Animalia
- Phylum: Arthropoda
- Class: Insecta
- Order: Coleoptera
- Suborder: Polyphaga
- Infraorder: Cucujiformia
- Family: Cerambycidae
- Genus: Eclipta
- Species: E. fanchonae

Binomial name
- Eclipta fanchonae (Penaherrera-Leiva & Tavakilian, 2003)

Species of beetle

Eclipta fanchonae is a species of beetle in the family Cerambycidae. It was described by Penaherrera-Leiva and Tavakilian in 2003.
