= Ecliptoides =

Scientific classification
- Kingdom: Animalia
- Phylum: Arthropoda
- Clade: Pancrustacea
- Class: Insecta
- Order: Coleoptera
- Suborder: Polyphaga
- Infraorder: Cucujiformia
- Family: Cerambycidae
- Subfamily: Cerambycinae
- Tribe: Rhinotragini
- Genus: Ecliptoides; Tavakilian & Peñaherrera, 2005

Genus of beetles

Ecliptoides is a genus of beetles in the family Cerambycidae, containing the following species:

- Ecliptoides azadi (Tavakilian & Peñaherrera-Leiva, 2003)
- Ecliptoides eunomia (Newman, 1841)
- Ecliptoides hovorei (Tavakilian & Peñaherrera-Leiva, 2003)
- Ecliptoides julietae Clarke, 2009
- Ecliptoides pepemujicai Da Silva, Monne, Santos-Silva & Rafael, 2026
- Ecliptoides pilosipes (Peñaherrera-Leiva & Tavakilian, 2004)
- Ecliptoides plaumanni (Fuchs, 1961)
- Ecliptoides rouperti (Tavakilian & Peñaherrera-Leiva, 2005)
- Ecliptoides titoi Clarke, 2009
- Ecliptoides vargasi Clarke, 2009
