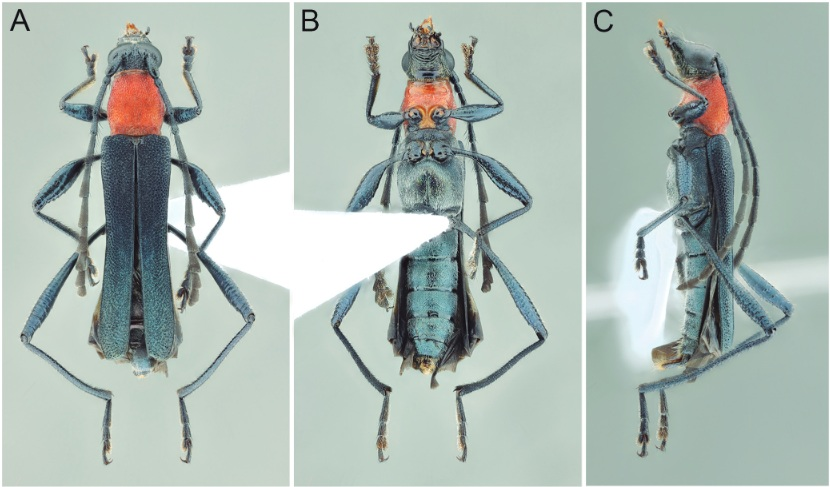

Scientific classification
- Kingdom: Animalia
- Phylum: Arthropoda
- Clade: Pancrustacea
- Class: Insecta
- Order: Coleoptera
- Suborder: Polyphaga
- Infraorder: Cucujiformia
- Family: Cerambycidae
- Genus: Eclipta
- Species: E. migueli

Binomial name
- Eclipta migueli Santos-Silva & Biffi, 2026

= Eclipta migueli =

Species of beetle

Eclipta migueli is a species of beetle of the family Cerambycidae. It is found in Brazil (São Paulo).

== Description ==
Adults reach a length of about 10–10.15 mm (0.394–0.400 in). The head capsule is shiny black dorsally and laterally, but shiny dark green ventrally (except for the black posterocentral area with slightly violaceous reflections). The clypeus is mostly shiny black and the ventral mouthparts have dark-brown, brown, and yellowish-brown areas. The prothorax is orangish brown, except for a brownish area close to the anterior margin of the pronotum. There are irregular dark brown areas on the sides of the pronotum near the anterior constriction, a dark orangish-brown area with irregular dark-brown regions on the posterior seventh of the pronotum and most of the posterior seventh of the sides of the prothorax. The area close to the anterior margin of the sides of the prothorax and prosternum is mostly dark brown. The scutellum and elytra are shiny bluish black, the elytra with dark-green reflections on some areas. The legs are shiny blackish blue.

== Etymology ==
The species is named in honour of Professor Miguel A. Monné.
