= Eclipta signaticollis =

Scientific classification
- Kingdom: Animalia
- Phylum: Arthropoda
- Class: Insecta
- Order: Coleoptera
- Suborder: Polyphaga
- Infraorder: Cucujiformia
- Family: Cerambycidae
- Genus: Eclipta
- Species: E. signaticollis

Binomial name
- Eclipta signaticollis (Melzer, 1922)

Species of beetle

Eclipta signaticollis is a species of beetle in the family Cerambycidae. It was described by Melzer in 1922.
