= Eclipta romani =

Scientific classification
- Kingdom: Animalia
- Phylum: Arthropoda
- Class: Insecta
- Order: Coleoptera
- Suborder: Polyphaga
- Infraorder: Cucujiformia
- Family: Cerambycidae
- Genus: Eclipta
- Species: E. romani

Binomial name
- Eclipta romani (Aurivillius, 1919)

Species of beetle

Eclipta romani is a species of beetle in the family Cerambycidae. It was described by Per Olof Christopher Aurivillius in 1919.
