= Eclipta seabrai =

Scientific classification
- Kingdom: Animalia
- Phylum: Arthropoda
- Class: Insecta
- Order: Coleoptera
- Suborder: Polyphaga
- Infraorder: Cucujiformia
- Family: Cerambycidae
- Genus: Eclipta
- Species: E. seabrai

Binomial name
- Eclipta seabrai (Zajciw, 1960)

Species of beetle

Eclipta seabrai is a species of beetle in the family Cerambycidae. It was described by Zajciw in 1960.
