= Eclipta sallaei =

Scientific classification
- Kingdom: Animalia
- Phylum: Arthropoda
- Class: Insecta
- Order: Coleoptera
- Suborder: Polyphaga
- Infraorder: Cucujiformia
- Family: Cerambycidae
- Genus: Eclipta
- Species: E. sallaei

Binomial name
- Eclipta sallaei (Bates, 1885)

Species of beetle

Eclipta sallaei is a species of beetle in the family Cerambycidae. It was described by Bates in 1885.
