= Eclipta aegrota =

Scientific classification
- Kingdom: Animalia
- Phylum: Arthropoda
- Class: Insecta
- Order: Coleoptera
- Suborder: Polyphaga
- Infraorder: Cucujiformia
- Family: Cerambycidae
- Genus: Eclipta
- Species: E. aegrota

Binomial name
- Eclipta aegrota (Bates, 1872)

Species of beetle

Eclipta aegrota is a species of beetle in the family Cerambycidae. It was described by Bates in 1872.
