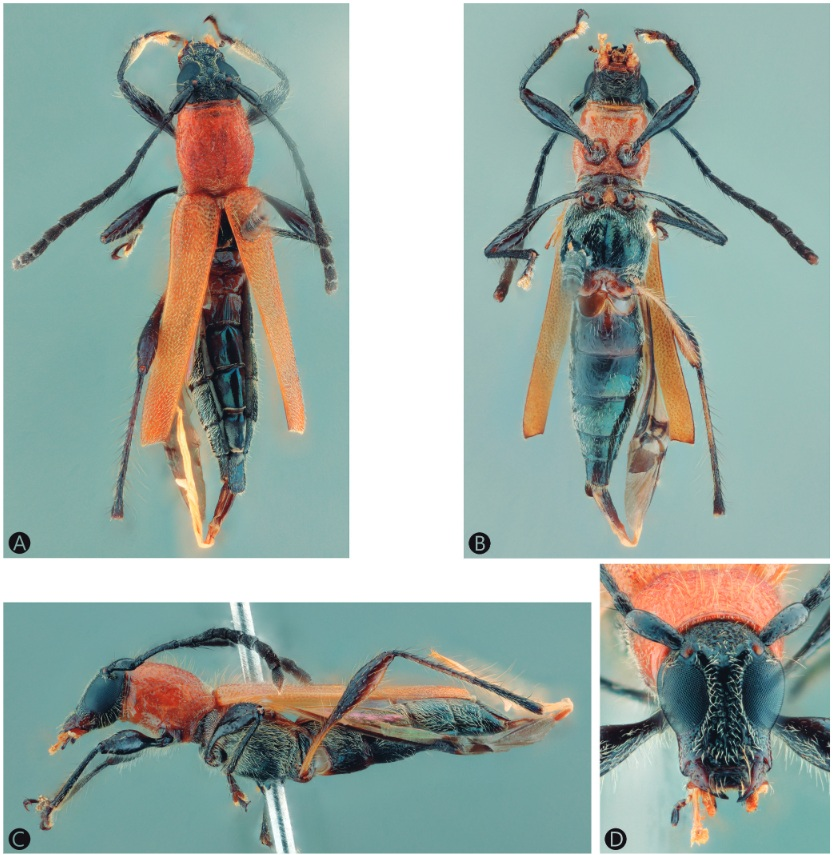

Scientific classification
- Kingdom: Animalia
- Phylum: Arthropoda
- Clade: Pancrustacea
- Class: Insecta
- Order: Coleoptera
- Suborder: Polyphaga
- Infraorder: Cucujiformia
- Family: Cerambycidae
- Genus: Eclipta
- Species: E. monnei

Binomial name
- Eclipta monnei Da Silva, Monne, Santos-Silva & Rafael, 2026

= Eclipta monnei =

Species of beetle

Eclipta monnei is a species of beetle of the family Cerambycidae. It is found in Brazil (Amazonas).

== Description ==
Adults reach a length of about 7.5 mm (0.30 in). The head capsule is blackish, except for the partially reddish brown and dark‑brown ventral surface. The pronotum is orangish brown, but slightly lighter ventrally. The scutellum is orangish brown and the elytra are orange. The abdomen is blackish with both greenish and violaceous reflections.

== Etymology ==
The species is named in honour of Dr. Miguel A. Monné.
