= Eclipta melzeri =

Scientific classification
- Kingdom: Animalia
- Phylum: Arthropoda
- Class: Insecta
- Order: Coleoptera
- Suborder: Polyphaga
- Infraorder: Cucujiformia
- Family: Cerambycidae
- Genus: Eclipta
- Species: E. melzeri

Binomial name
- Eclipta melzeri (Zajciw, 1967)

Species of beetle

Eclipta melzeri is a species of beetle in the family Cerambycidae. It was described by Zajciw in 1967.
