= Ecliptoides azadi =

Scientific classification
- Domain: Eukaryota
- Kingdom: Animalia
- Phylum: Arthropoda
- Class: Insecta
- Order: Coleoptera
- Suborder: Polyphaga
- Infraorder: Cucujiformia
- Family: Cerambycidae
- Genus: Ecliptoides
- Species: E. azadi

Binomial name
- Ecliptoides azadi (Tavakilian & Peñaherrera-Leiva, 2003)

Synonyms
- Ommata azadi Tavakilian & Peñaherrera, 2003; Ommata azadi Peñaherrera & Tavakilian, 2004; Ommata azadi Tavakilian & Peñaherrera, 2005 (Tavakilian & Peñaherrera, 2007)

Species of beetle

Ecliptoides azadi is a species of beetle in the family Cerambycidae. It was described by Tavakilian and Peñaherrera-Leiva in 2003. It is endemic to Guyana where it flies in September.
