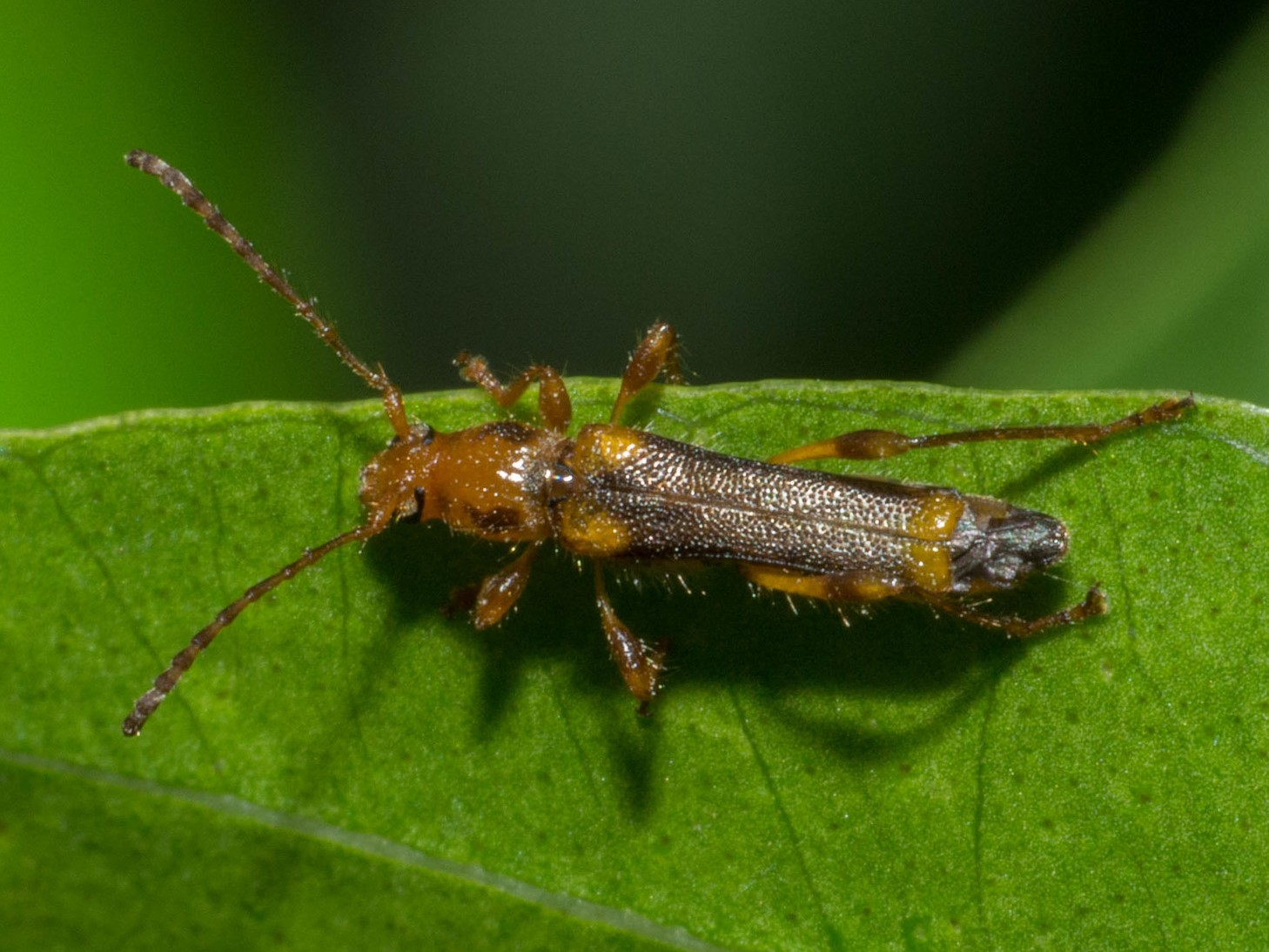

Scientific classification
- Kingdom: Animalia
- Phylum: Arthropoda
- Clade: Pancrustacea
- Class: Insecta
- Order: Coleoptera
- Suborder: Polyphaga
- Infraorder: Cucujiformia
- Family: Cerambycidae
- Genus: Eclipta
- Species: E. amabilis

Binomial name
- Eclipta amabilis (Melzer, 1934)

= Eclipta amabilis =

Species of beetle

Eclipta amabilis is a species of beetle in the family Cerambycidae. It was first described by Julius Melzer in 1934.
