= Ecliptoides hovorei =

Scientific classification
- Domain: Eukaryota
- Kingdom: Animalia
- Phylum: Arthropoda
- Class: Insecta
- Order: Coleoptera
- Suborder: Polyphaga
- Infraorder: Cucujiformia
- Family: Cerambycidae
- Genus: Ecliptoides
- Species: E. hovorei

Binomial name
- Ecliptoides hovorei (Tavakilian & Peñaherrera-Leiva, 2003)

Synonyms
- Ommata hovorei Tavakilian & Peñaherrera, 2003; Ommata hovorei Peñaherrera & Tavakilian, 2004; Ommata hovorei Tavakilian & Peñaherrera, 2005 (Tavakilian & Peñaherrera, 2007)

Species of beetle

Ecliptoides hovorei is a species of beetle in the family Cerambycidae. It was described by Gérard Tavakilian and Ana Peñaherrera-Leiva in 2003.
