= Eclipta vitticollis =

Scientific classification
- Kingdom: Animalia
- Phylum: Arthropoda
- Class: Insecta
- Order: Coleoptera
- Suborder: Polyphaga
- Infraorder: Cucujiformia
- Family: Cerambycidae
- Genus: Eclipta
- Species: E. vitticollis

Binomial name
- Eclipta vitticollis (Bates, 1873)

Species of beetle

Eclipta vitticollis is a species of beetle in the family Cerambycidae. It was described by Bates in 1873.
