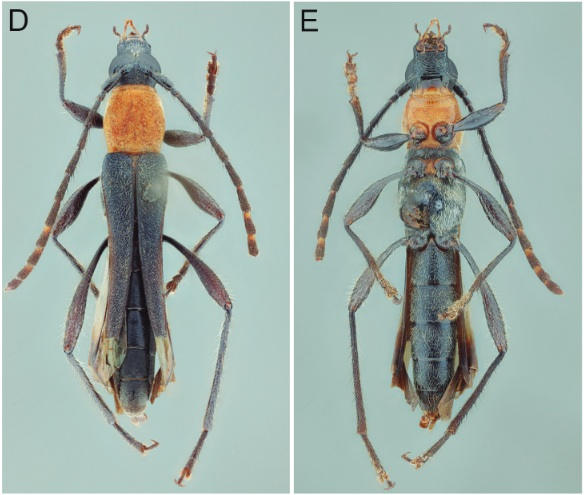

Scientific classification
- Kingdom: Animalia
- Phylum: Arthropoda
- Clade: Pancrustacea
- Class: Insecta
- Order: Coleoptera
- Suborder: Polyphaga
- Infraorder: Cucujiformia
- Family: Cerambycidae
- Genus: Eclipta
- Species: E. flavicollis

Binomial name
- Eclipta flavicollis (Bates, 1873)

= Eclipta flavicollis =

Species of beetle

Eclipta flavicollis is a species of beetle in the family Cerambycidae. It was described by Bates in 1873.
