= Eclipta faurei =

Scientific classification
- Kingdom: Animalia
- Phylum: Arthropoda
- Class: Insecta
- Order: Coleoptera
- Suborder: Polyphaga
- Infraorder: Cucujiformia
- Family: Cerambycidae
- Genus: Eclipta
- Species: E. faurei

Binomial name
- Eclipta faurei (Peñaherrera-Leiva & Tavakilian, 2003)

Species of beetle

Eclipta faurei is a species of beetle in the family Cerambycidae. It was described by Peñaherrera-Leiva and Tavakilian in 2003. It is known from French Guiana and Rondônia, central-western Brazil.
