= Ecliptoides plaumanni =

Scientific classification
- Kingdom: Animalia
- Phylum: Arthropoda
- Clade: Pancrustacea
- Class: Insecta
- Order: Coleoptera
- Suborder: Polyphaga
- Infraorder: Cucujiformia
- Family: Cerambycidae
- Genus: Ecliptoides
- Species: E. plaumanni

Binomial name
- Ecliptoides plaumanni (Fuchs, 1961)

Synonyms
- Ommata (Eclipta) plaumanni Fuchs, 1961

Species of beetle

Ecliptoides plaumanni is a species of beetle of the family Cerambycidae. It is found in Brazil (Minas Gerais, São Paulo, Santa Catarina, Rio Grande do Sul).
