= Eclipta socia =

Scientific classification
- Kingdom: Animalia
- Phylum: Arthropoda
- Class: Insecta
- Order: Coleoptera
- Suborder: Polyphaga
- Infraorder: Cucujiformia
- Family: Cerambycidae
- Genus: Eclipta
- Species: E. socia

Binomial name
- Eclipta socia (Melzer, 1934)

Species of beetle

Eclipta socia is a species of beetle in the family Cerambycidae. It was described by Melzer in 1934.
