= Eclipta quadrispinosa =

Scientific classification
- Kingdom: Animalia
- Phylum: Arthropoda
- Class: Insecta
- Order: Coleoptera
- Suborder: Polyphaga
- Infraorder: Cucujiformia
- Family: Cerambycidae
- Genus: Eclipta
- Species: E. quadrispinosa

Binomial name
- Eclipta quadrispinosa (Gounelle, 1913)

Species of beetle

Eclipta quadrispinosa is a species of beetle in the family Cerambycidae. It was described by Gounelle in 1913.
