= Eclipta amanoaphila =

Scientific classification
- Kingdom: Animalia
- Phylum: Arthropoda
- Class: Insecta
- Order: Coleoptera
- Suborder: Polyphaga
- Infraorder: Cucujiformia
- Family: Cerambycidae
- Genus: Eclipta
- Species: E. amanoaphila

Binomial name
- Eclipta amanoaphila (Penaherrera-Leiva & Tavakilian, 2003)

Species of beetle

Eclipta amanoaphila is a species of beetle in the family Cerambycidae. It was described by Penaherrera-Leiva and Tavakilian in 2003.
