= Eclipta collarti =

Scientific classification
- Kingdom: Animalia
- Phylum: Arthropoda
- Class: Insecta
- Order: Coleoptera
- Suborder: Polyphaga
- Infraorder: Cucujiformia
- Family: Cerambycidae
- Genus: Eclipta
- Species: E. collarti

Binomial name
- Eclipta collarti (E. Fuchs, 1959)

Species of beetle

Eclipta collarti is a species of beetle in the family Cerambycidae. It was described by Ernst Fuchs in 1959.
