= Eclipta championella =

Scientific classification
- Kingdom: Animalia
- Phylum: Arthropoda
- Class: Insecta
- Order: Coleoptera
- Suborder: Polyphaga
- Infraorder: Cucujiformia
- Family: Cerambycidae
- Genus: Eclipta
- Species: E. championella

Binomial name
- Eclipta championella (Bates, 1880)

Species of beetle

Eclipta championella is a species of beetle in the family Cerambycidae. It was described by Bates in 1880.
