= Eclipta curtipennis =

Scientific classification
- Kingdom: Animalia
- Phylum: Arthropoda
- Class: Insecta
- Order: Coleoptera
- Suborder: Polyphaga
- Infraorder: Cucujiformia
- Family: Cerambycidae
- Genus: Eclipta
- Species: E. curtipennis

Binomial name
- Eclipta curtipennis (Zajciw, 1966)

Species of beetle

Eclipta curtipennis is a species of beetle in the family Cerambycidae. It was described by Zajciw in 1966.
