= Eclipta igniventris =

Scientific classification
- Kingdom: Animalia
- Phylum: Arthropoda
- Class: Insecta
- Order: Coleoptera
- Suborder: Polyphaga
- Infraorder: Cucujiformia
- Family: Cerambycidae
- Genus: Eclipta
- Species: E. igniventris

Binomial name
- Eclipta igniventris (Giesbert, 1991)

Species of beetle

Eclipta igniventris is a species of beetle in the family Cerambycidae. It was described by Giesbert in 1991.
