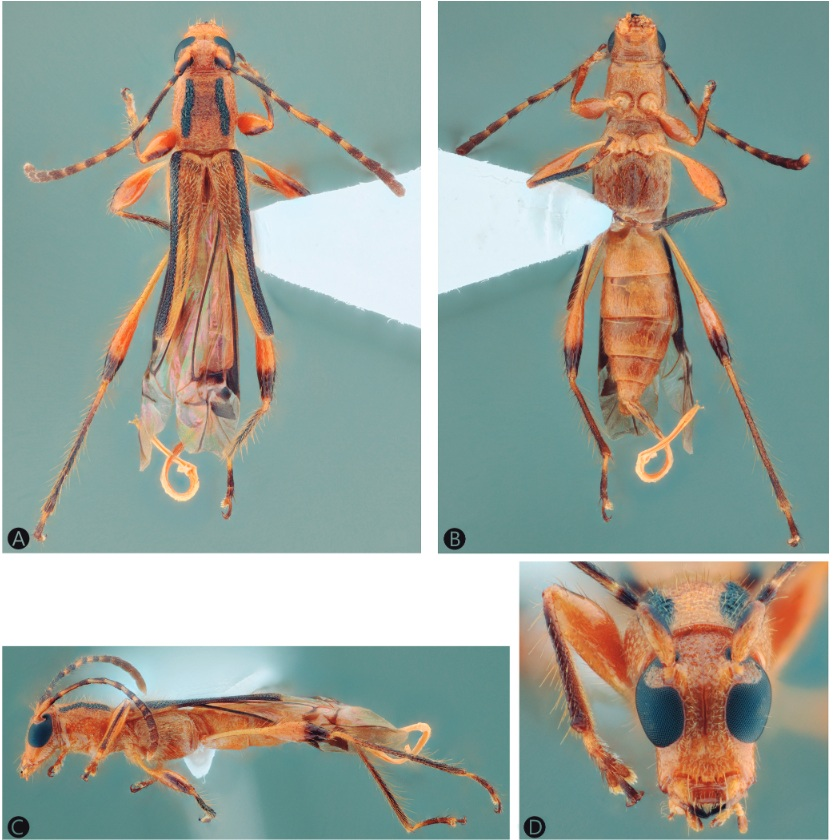

Scientific classification
- Kingdom: Animalia
- Phylum: Arthropoda
- Clade: Pancrustacea
- Class: Insecta
- Order: Coleoptera
- Suborder: Polyphaga
- Infraorder: Cucujiformia
- Family: Cerambycidae
- Genus: Ecliptoides
- Species: E. pepemujicai

Binomial name
- Ecliptoides pepemujicai Da Silva, Monne, Santos-Silva & Rafael, 2026

= Ecliptoides pepemujicai =

Species of beetle

Ecliptoides pepemujicai is a species of beetle of the family Cerambycidae. It is found in Brazil (Amazonas).

== Description ==
Adults reach a length of about 7.35 mm (0.289 in). The integument is mostly orangish, but more orangish brown on some areas. The pronotum has a wide, longitudinal, slightly sinuous dark‑brown band on each side, from near the anterior constriction to the posterior fifth, with large brownish macula centrally from about the anterior fifth to the middle. The elytra are dark brown laterally, from the sides of the dorsal surface to the epipleural margin, except for the orangish‑brown sides of the basal fifth and basal third of the epipleural margin, and narrow apical area. The remaining surface is orangish, more orangish brown on most of the anterior third.

== Etymology ==
The species is named in honour of the Uruguayan political leader José Alberto “Pepe” Mujica Cordano.
