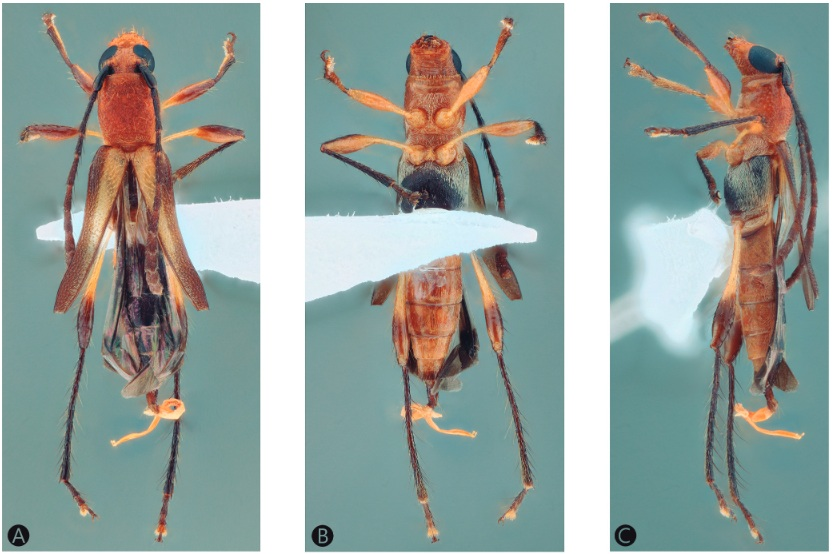

Scientific classification
- Kingdom: Animalia
- Phylum: Arthropoda
- Clade: Pancrustacea
- Class: Insecta
- Order: Coleoptera
- Suborder: Polyphaga
- Infraorder: Cucujiformia
- Family: Cerambycidae
- Genus: Ecliptoides
- Species: E. pilosipes

Binomial name
- Ecliptoides pilosipes (Penaherrera-Leiva & Tavakilian, 2004)

Synonyms
- Ommata (Eclipta) pilosipes Peñaherrera & Tavakilian, 2004; Eclipta pilosipes

= Ecliptoides pilosipes =

Species of beetle

Ecliptoides pilosipes is a species of beetle in the family Cerambycidae. It was described by Penaherrera-Leiva and Tavakilian in 2004. It is found in French Guiana and Brazil (Pará, Amazonas).
