= Ecliptoides eunomia =

Scientific classification
- Kingdom: Animalia
- Phylum: Arthropoda
- Clade: Pancrustacea
- Class: Insecta
- Order: Coleoptera
- Suborder: Polyphaga
- Infraorder: Cucujiformia
- Family: Cerambycidae
- Genus: Ecliptoides
- Species: E. eunomia

Binomial name
- Ecliptoides eunomia (Newman, 1841)

Synonyms
- Odontocera eunomia Newman, 1841; Eclipta eunomia; Ommata eunonia var. nigrilatera Gounelle, 1911

Species of beetle

Ecliptoides eunomia is a species of beetle in the family Cerambycidae. It was described by Edward Newman in 1841. It is found in Brazil (Goiás, Bahia, Minas Gerais, Espírito Santo, Rio de Janeiro, São Paulo, Paraná, Santa Catarina, Rio Grande do Sul) and Argentina (Misiones).
