= Paraserica grisea =

Scientific classification
- Kingdom: Animalia
- Phylum: Arthropoda
- Class: Insecta
- Order: Coleoptera
- Suborder: Polyphaga
- Infraorder: Scarabaeiformia
- Family: Scarabaeidae
- Genus: Paraserica
- Species: P. grisea

Binomial name
- Paraserica grisea (Motschulsky, 1866)

Synonyms
- Serica grisea Motschulsky, 1866

Species of beetle

Paraserica grisea is a species of beetle of the family Scarabaeidae. It is found in China (Hubei, Shaanxi), Japan and possibly Korea.

== Description ==
Adults reach a length of about 7–9 mm. They have a black, shiny body with a metallic shine. The dorsal surface is covered with fine, dense setae.
