= Paraserica =

Scientific classification
- Kingdom: Animalia
- Phylum: Arthropoda
- Class: Insecta
- Order: Coleoptera
- Suborder: Polyphaga
- Infraorder: Scarabaeiformia
- Family: Scarabaeidae
- Subfamily: Sericinae
- Tribe: Sericini
- Genus: Paraserica; Miyake & Yamaya, 1994

Genus of leaf beetles

Paraserica is a genus of beetles belonging to the family Scarabaeidae.

== Species ==
- Paraserica camillerii Ahrens, Fabrizi & Liu, 2017
- Paraserica grisea (Motschulsky, 1866)
- Paraserica mupuensis Ahrens, Fabrizi & Liu, 2017
- Paraserica taiwana Nomura & Kobayashi, 1979
- Paraserica wangi Ahrens, Fabrizi & Liu, 2017
