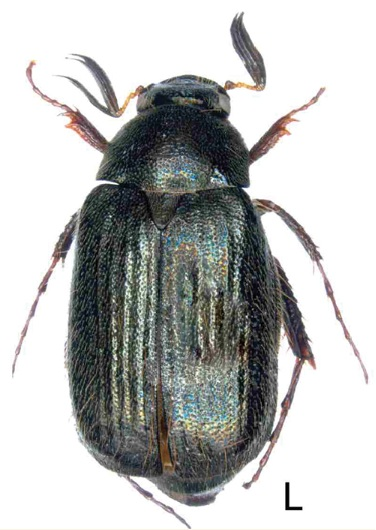

Scientific classification
- Kingdom: Animalia
- Phylum: Arthropoda
- Clade: Pancrustacea
- Class: Insecta
- Order: Coleoptera
- Suborder: Polyphaga
- Infraorder: Scarabaeiformia
- Family: Scarabaeidae
- Genus: Paraserica
- Species: P. wangi

Binomial name
- Paraserica wangi Ahrens, Fabrizi & Liu, 2017

= Paraserica wangi =

Species of beetle

Paraserica wangi is a species of beetle of the family Scarabaeidae. It is found in China (Guizhou).

== Description ==
Adults reach a length of about 8.3 mm. They have a greyish-black, oblong body. The antennae are yellowish brown. The dorsal and ventral surface are shiny and densely setose with partly double pilosity.

== Etymology ==
The species is named after its collector, Wang Zhiliang.
