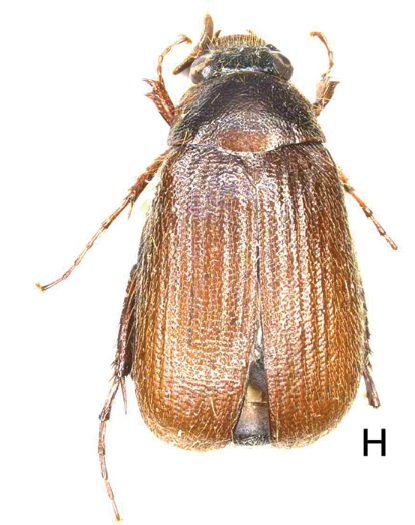

Scientific classification
- Kingdom: Animalia
- Phylum: Arthropoda
- Class: Insecta
- Order: Coleoptera
- Suborder: Polyphaga
- Infraorder: Scarabaeiformia
- Family: Scarabaeidae
- Genus: Paraserica
- Species: P. mupuensis

Binomial name
- Paraserica mupuensis Ahrens, Fabrizi & Liu, 2017

= Paraserica mupuensis =

Species of beetle

Paraserica mupuensis is a species of beetle of the family Scarabaeidae. It is found in China (Fujian, Hubei, Hunan, Zhejiang).

== Description ==
Adults reach a length of about 7.8–8.8 mm. They have an oblong body. The head and pronotum (including legs) are dark brown, while the elytra are reddish brown and the antennae are yellowish brown. The dorsal and ventral surface are shiny and densely setose with partly double pilosity.

== Etymology ==
The species is named after the type locality in Mupu Mountain.
