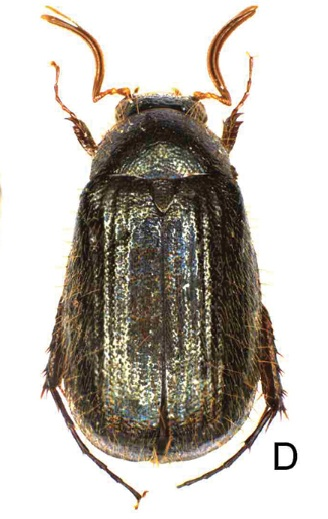

Scientific classification
- Kingdom: Animalia
- Phylum: Arthropoda
- Clade: Pancrustacea
- Class: Insecta
- Order: Coleoptera
- Suborder: Polyphaga
- Infraorder: Scarabaeiformia
- Family: Scarabaeidae
- Genus: Paraserica
- Species: P. camillerii

Binomial name
- Paraserica camillerii Ahrens, Fabrizi & Liu, 2017

= Paraserica camillerii =

Species of beetle

Paraserica camillerii is a species of beetle of the family Scarabaeidae. It is found in China (Guizhou).

== Description ==
Adults reach a length of about 7–8.1 mm. They have an oblong body. The body (including legs) is dark brown to grey-blackish, with yellowish brown antennae. The dorsal and ventral surface are shiny and densely setose with double pilosity.

== Etymology ==
The species is dedicated to the Sicilian writer, Andrea Camilleri.
