= List of the Paleozoic life of Michigan =

This list of the Paleozoic life of Michigan contains the various prehistoric life-forms whose fossilized remains have been reported from within the US state of Michigan and are between 538.8 and 252.17 million years of age.

== A ==
- †Acanthoclema
  - †Acanthoclema ohioensis
- †Acanthonema – type locality for genus
  - †Acanthonema holopiforme – type locality for species
  - †Acanthonema laxa – type locality for species
- †Acidaspis
- †Actinoceras
  - †Actinoceras backi
  - †Actinoceras bigsbyi – or unidentified comparable form
  - †Actinoceras gouldense – type locality for species
  - †Actinoceras sphaeroidale
- †Alaskozygopleura
  - †Alaskozygopleura gracillium
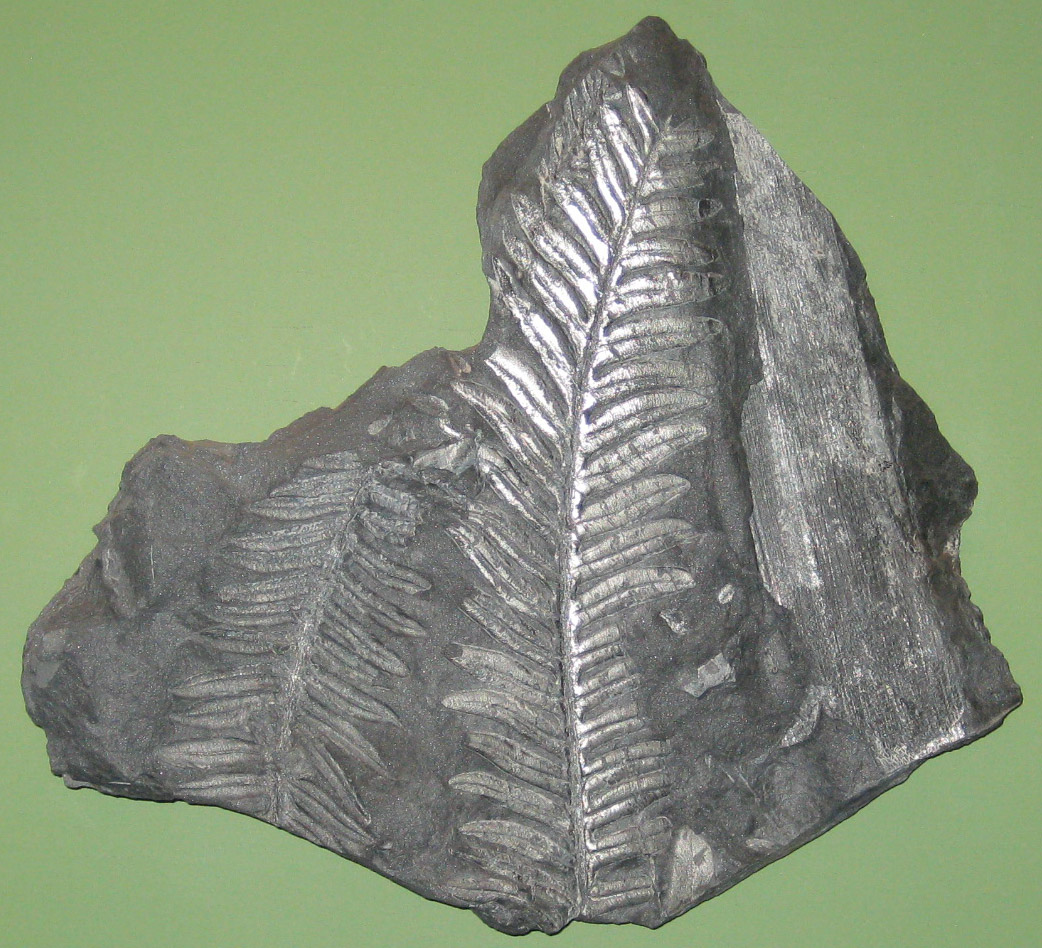
- Fossilized fronds of the Carboniferous-Early Cretaceous seed fern Alethopteris
  †Alethopteris
  - †Alethopteris decurrens
  - †Alethopteris Helenae
- †Allonema
- †Ambocoelia – report made of unidentified related form or using admittedly obsolete nomenclature
  - †Ambocoelia umbonata – report made of unidentified related form or using admittedly obsolete nomenclature
- †Ambonychia
  - †Ambonychia carinata
  - †Ambonychia elroyi
  - †Ambonychia obesa
- †Amphilichas
  - †Amphilichas cucullus – tentative report
- †Anazyga
  - †Anazyga recurvirostra
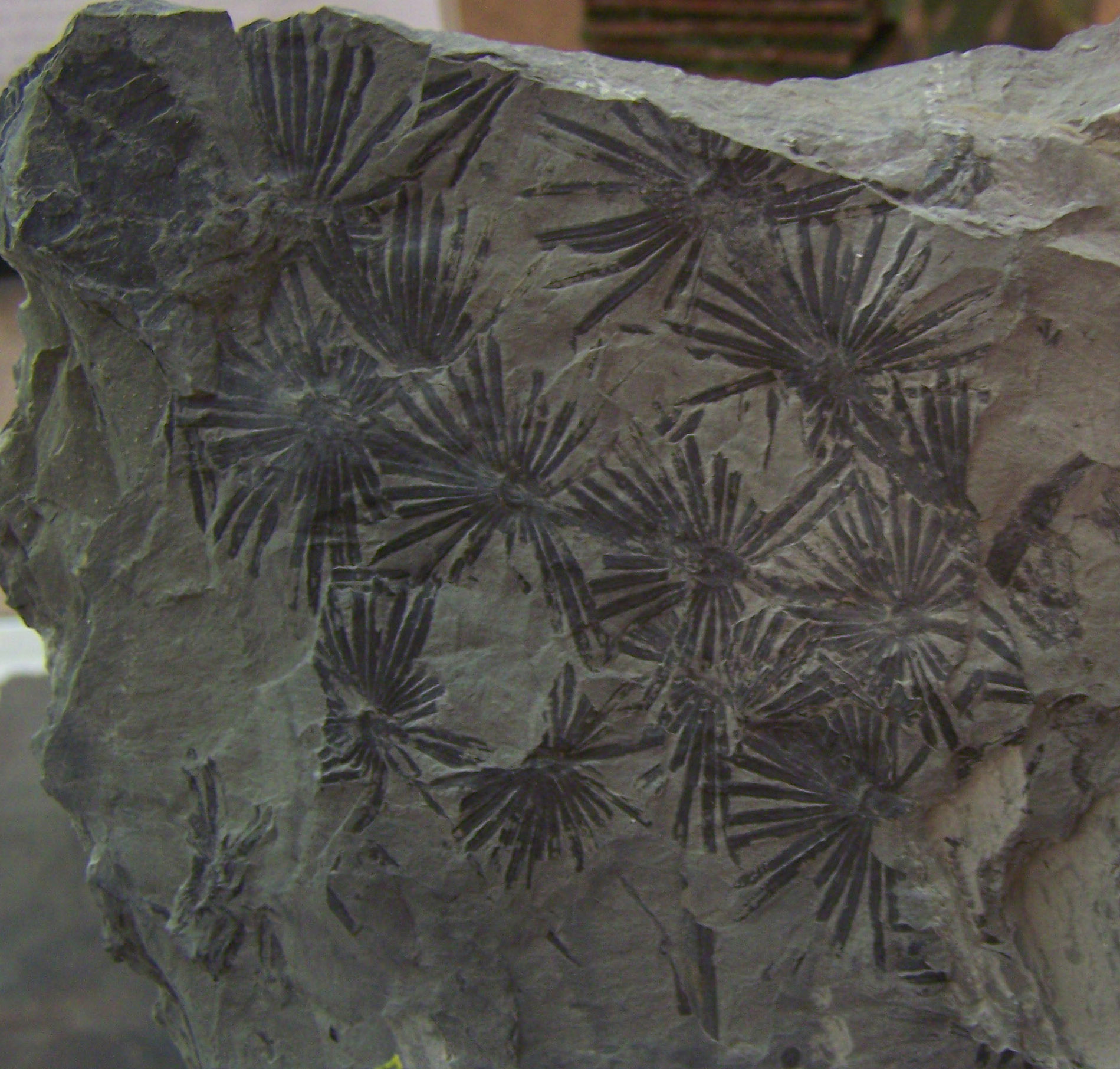
- Fossil of the Carboniferous horsetail relative Annularia
  †Annularia
  - †Annularia asteris
  - †Annularia sphenophylloides
- †Anomalodonta
  - †Anomalodonta gigantea – or unidentified comparable form
- †Anoptera
  - †Anoptera angusta
- †Anthropora
  - †Anthropora shafferi
- †Antirotella
  - †Antirotella helicinaeformis – type locality for species
- †Archinacella
  - †Archinacella kagawongensis
- †Arcyzona
  - †Arcyzona apobathrota
- †Arthroacantha
  - †Arthroacantha carpenteri
- †Ascodictyon
  - †Ascodictyon fusiforme
- †Asolanus
  - †Asolanus camptotaena
- †Asterophyllites
  - †Asterophyllites equisetiformis
  - †Asterophyllites longifolius – or unidentified comparable form
  - †Asterophyllites vernensis
- †Atactoechus
  - †Atactoechus typicus – or unidentified comparable form
- †Athyris
  - †Athyris lens
  - †Athyris vittata
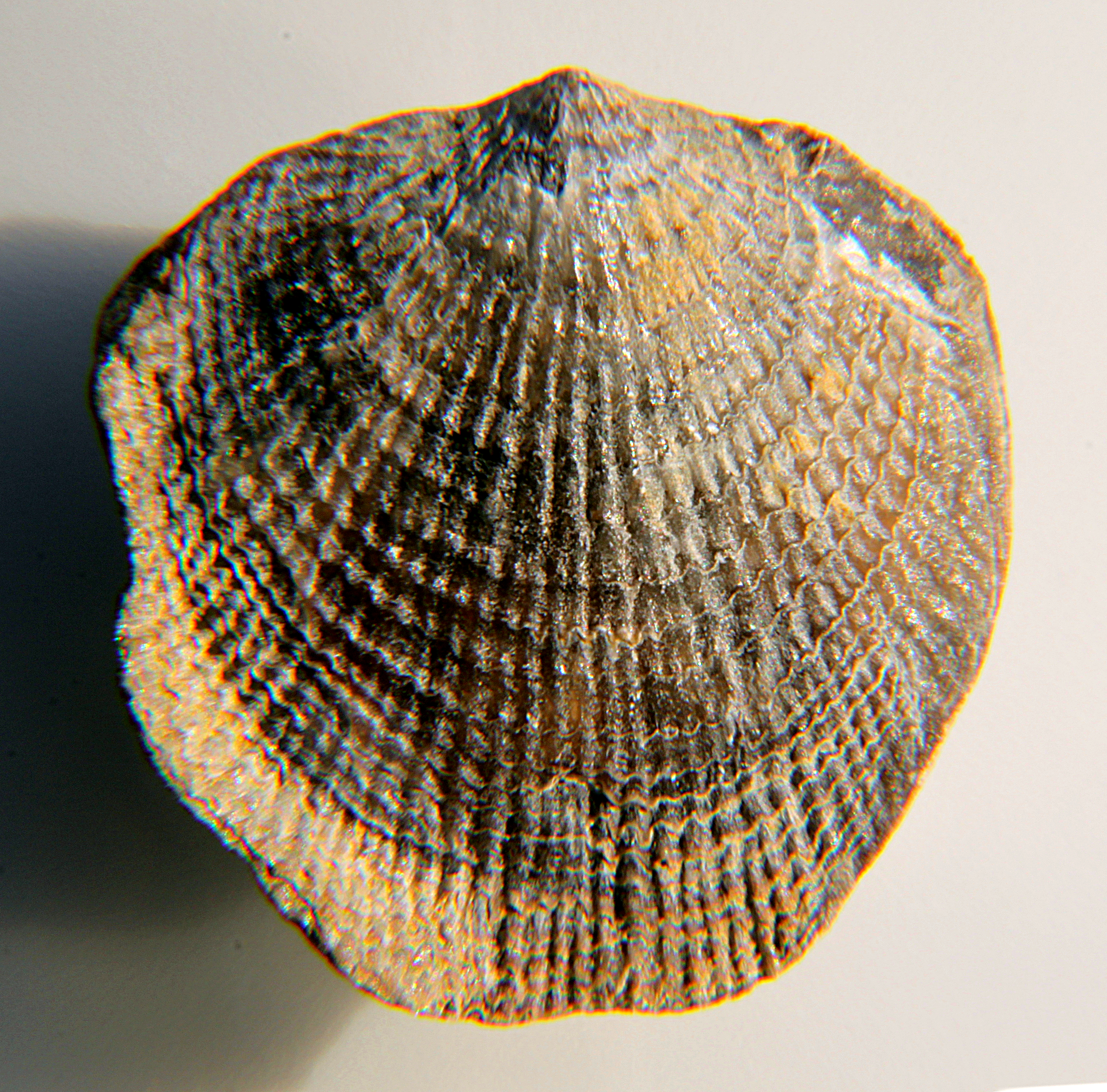
- Fossilized shell of the Late Ordovician-Carboniferous brachiopod Atrypa
  †Atrypa
  - †Atrypa traversensis
- †Aulacera
  - †Aulacera nodulifera
- †Aulacotheca
  - †Aulacotheca Campbelli
- †Aulocystis
  - †Aulocystis auloporoidea
  - †Aulocystis jacksoni
  - †Aulocystis lucasensis
- †Aulopora
  - †Aulopora microbuccinata

== B ==
- †Batostoma
- †Beatricea
  - †Beatricea undulata
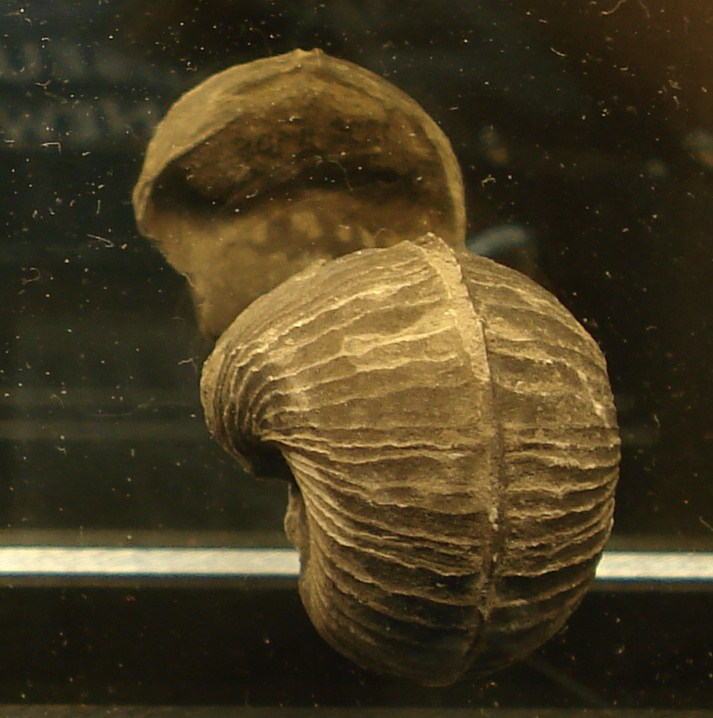
- Fossilized shell of the Silurian-Early Triassic mollusc Bellerophon
  †Bellerophon
  - †Bellerophon barquensis – type locality for species
  - †Bellerophon newberryi
  - †Bellerophon pelops
- †Bensbergia
  - †Bensbergia subcostata
- †Bethanyphyllum
  - †Bethanyphyllum robustum
- †Bicarina
  - †Bicarina petilitornata
- †Bigalea – type locality for genus
  - †Bigalea yangi – type locality for species
- †Billingsites
  - †Billingsites newberryi
- †Bothrodendron
  - †Bothrodendron minutifolium
  - †Bothrodendron punctatum
- †Botryllopora
  - †Botryllopora socialis
- †Bowmanites
- †Brachyprion
- †Buechelia
  - †Buechelia tyrrelli
- †Byssonychia
  - †Byssonychia richmondensis
- Bythocypris
  - †Bythocypris cylindrica
- †Bythopora
  - †Bythopora striata

== C ==
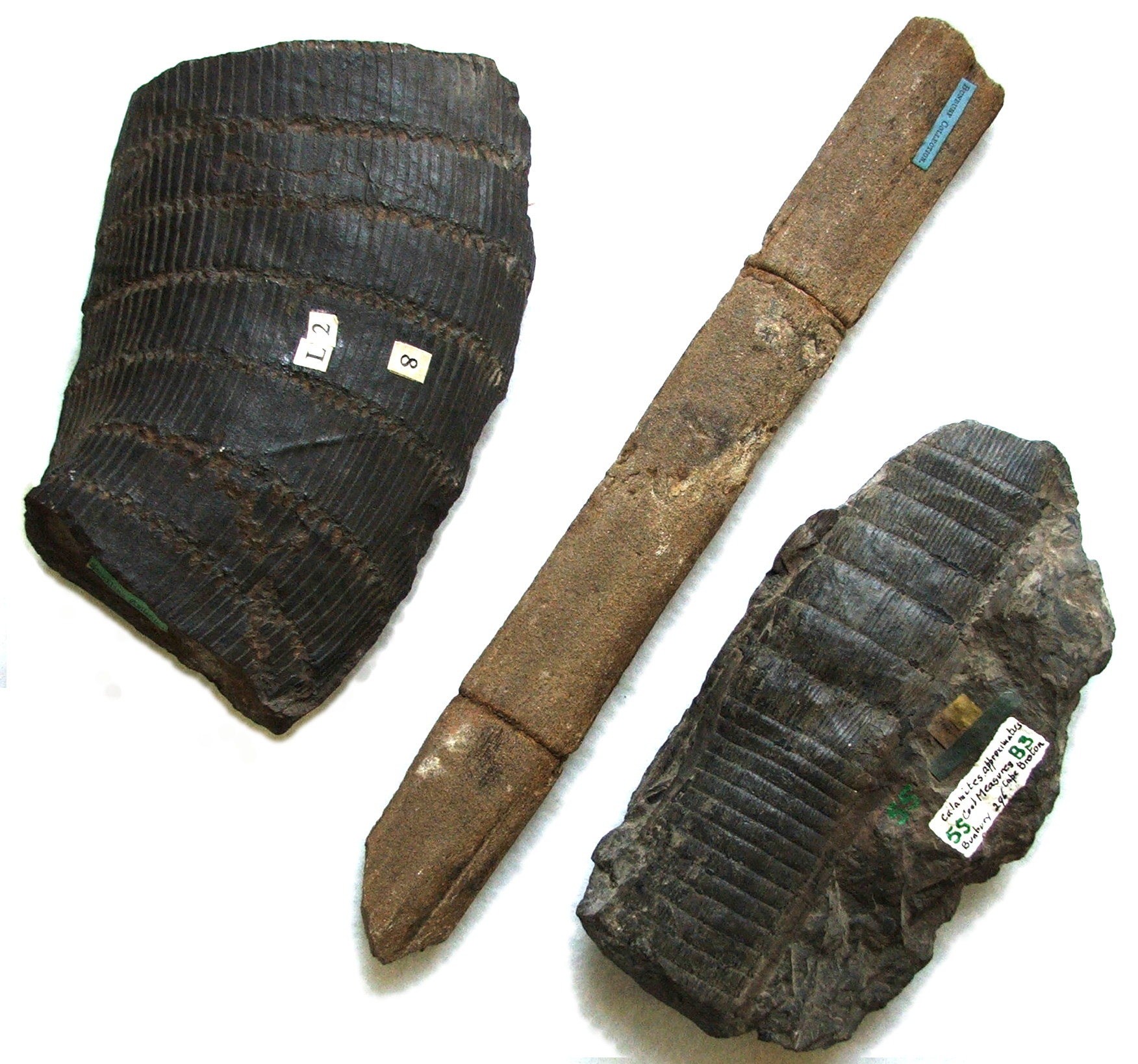
- Fossilized stems from the Carboniferous-Permian horsetail relative Calamites
  †Calamites
  - †Calamites carinatus
  - †Calamites cistii
  - †Calamites ramosus
  - †Calamites schutzeiformis
  - †Calamites suckowii
  - †Calamites undulatus
- †Calapoecia
  - †Calapoecia cribriformis
  - †Calapoecia huronensis
- †Callipleura
  - †Callipleura nobilis – or unidentified comparable form
- †Callixylon
  - †Callixylon newberryi
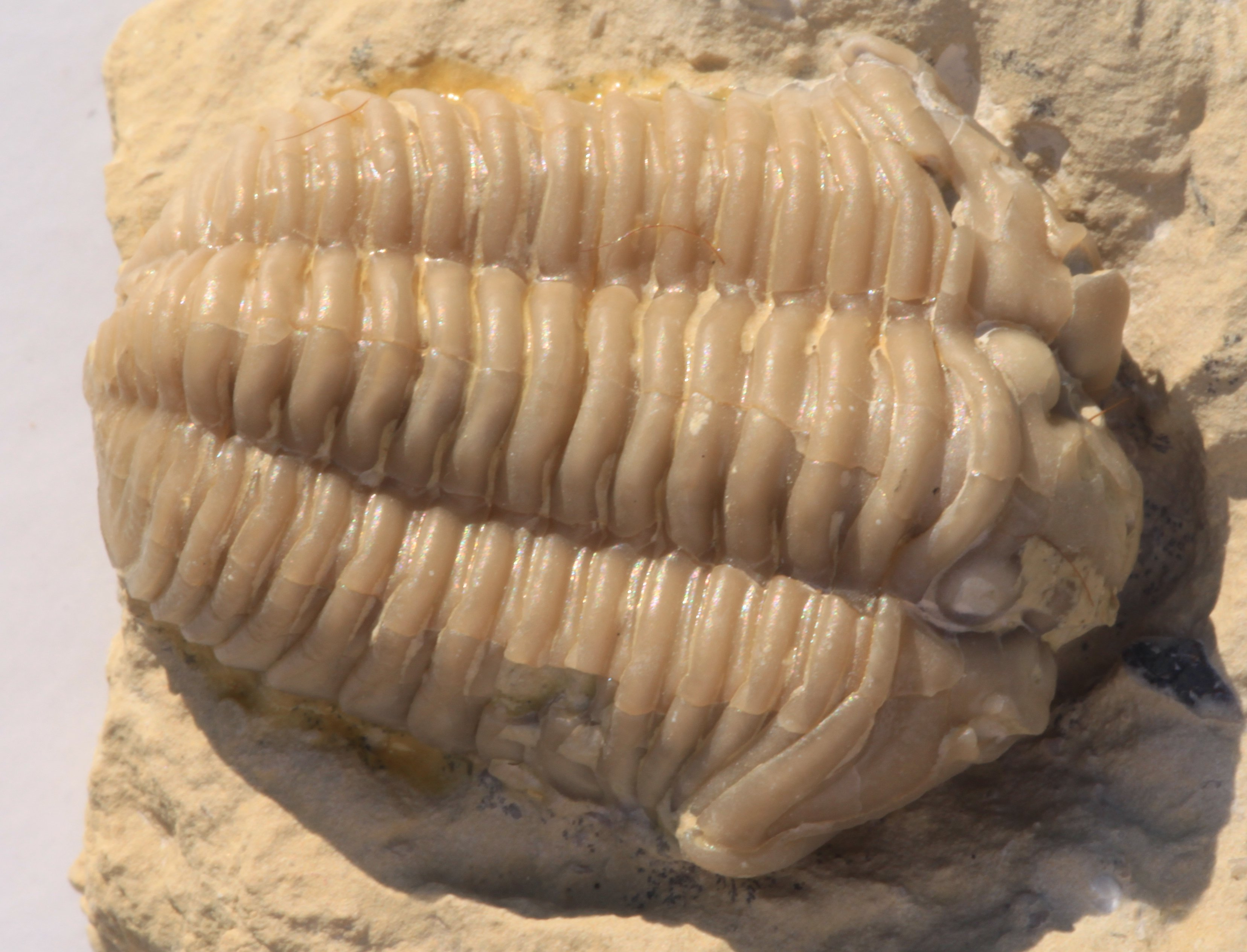
- Fossil of the Early Ordovician-Early Devonian trilobite Calymene
  †Calymene
- †Camarotoechia
- †Cardiocaron
  - †Cardiocaron reniformis
- †Cardiocarpon
  - †Cardiocarpon annulatum
  - †Cardiocarpon bicuspidatum
  - †Cardiocarpon cuyahogae
  - †Cardiocarpon late-alatum
  - †Cardiocarpon ovale
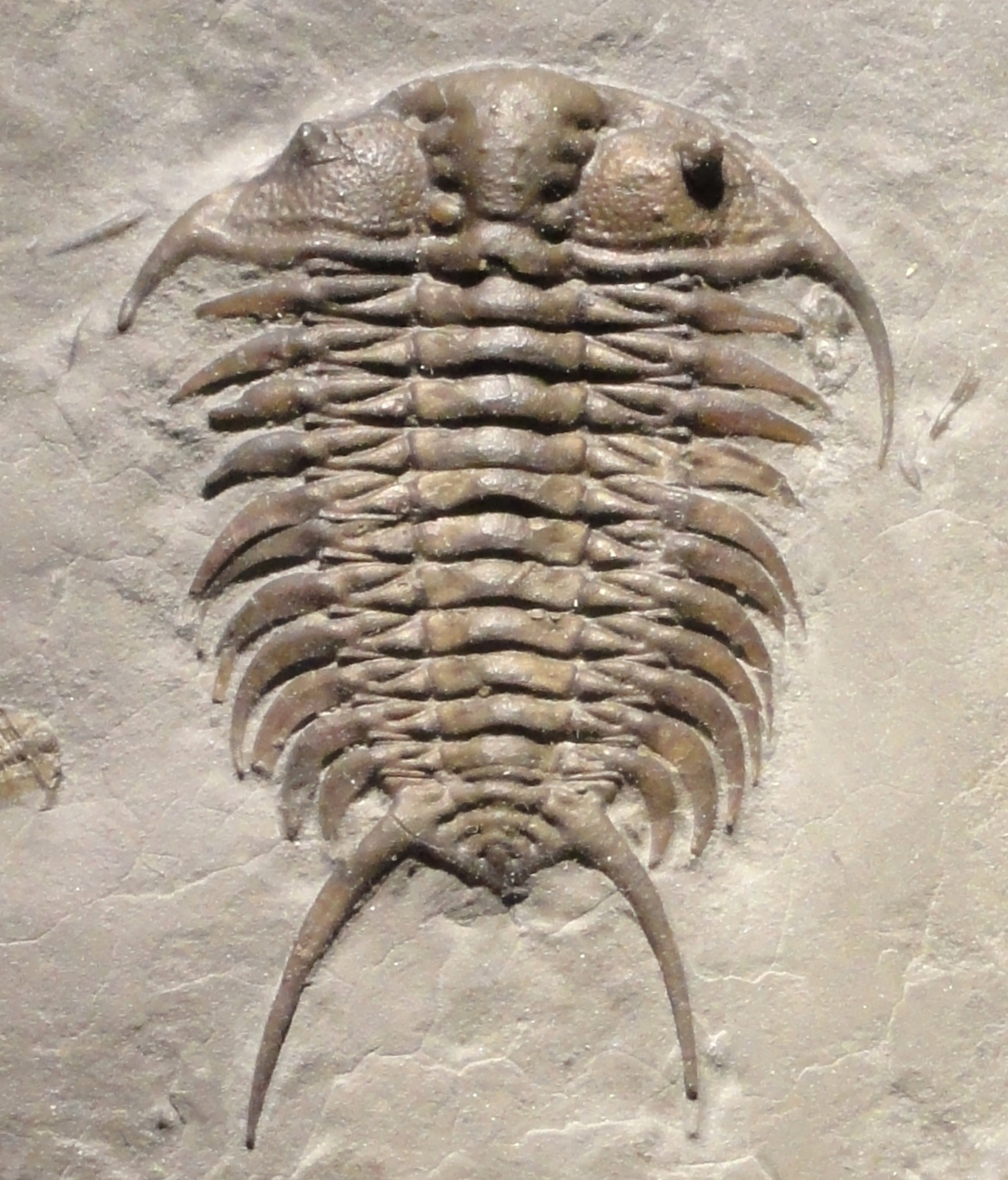
- Fossil of the Middle-Late Ordovician trilobite Ceraurus
  †Ceraurus
  - †Ceraurus simmonsi
- †Cerithioides
  - †Cerithioides incomptum
- †Cheirocrinus – tentative report
- †Chonetes
  - †Chonetes ensicosta
  - †Chonetes hybus
  - †Chonetes pachyactis
- †Clathronema
  - †Clathronema cingulata
- †Clidophorus
  - †Clidophorus noquettensis
  - †Clidophorus ogontzensis
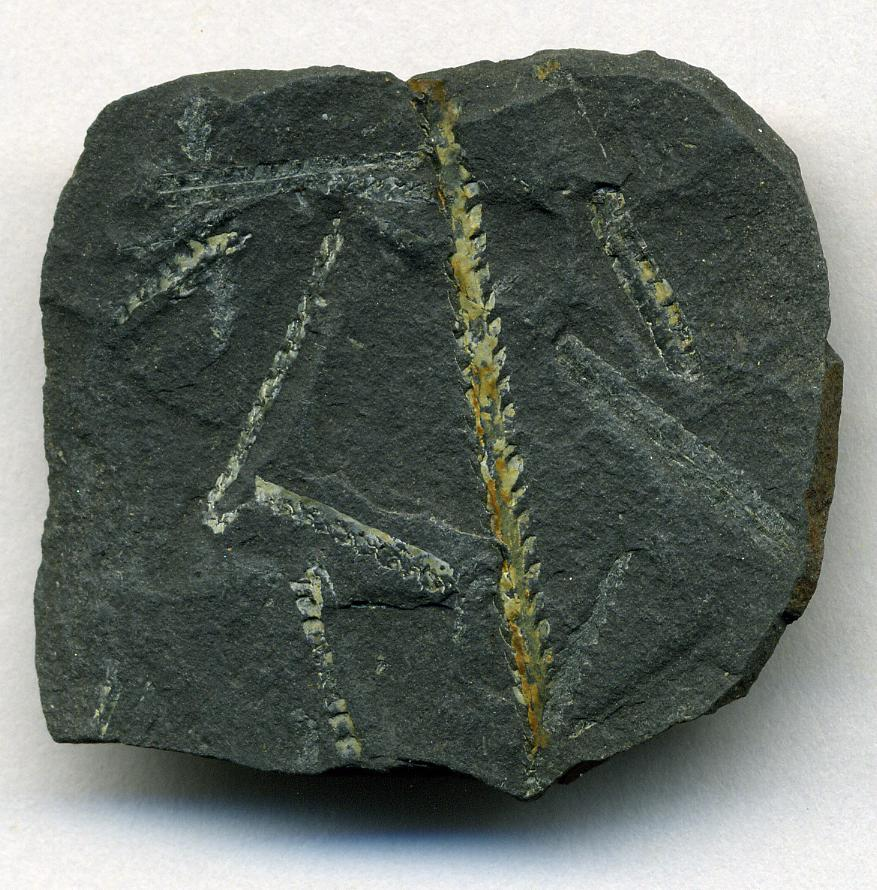
- Assemblage of fossils of the Cambrian graptolite Climacograptus
  †Climacograptus
  - †Climacograptus putillus
- †Coelospira
- †Coleolus
- †Colpomya
  - †Colpomya colgateri
- †Columnaria
  - †Columnaria alveolata
  - †Columnaria calicina
  - †Columnaria stokesi
- †Conularia
  - †Conularia formosa
  - †Conularia trentonensis
- †Cordaianthus
  - †Cordaianthus ampullaceus
  - †Cordaianthus devonicus
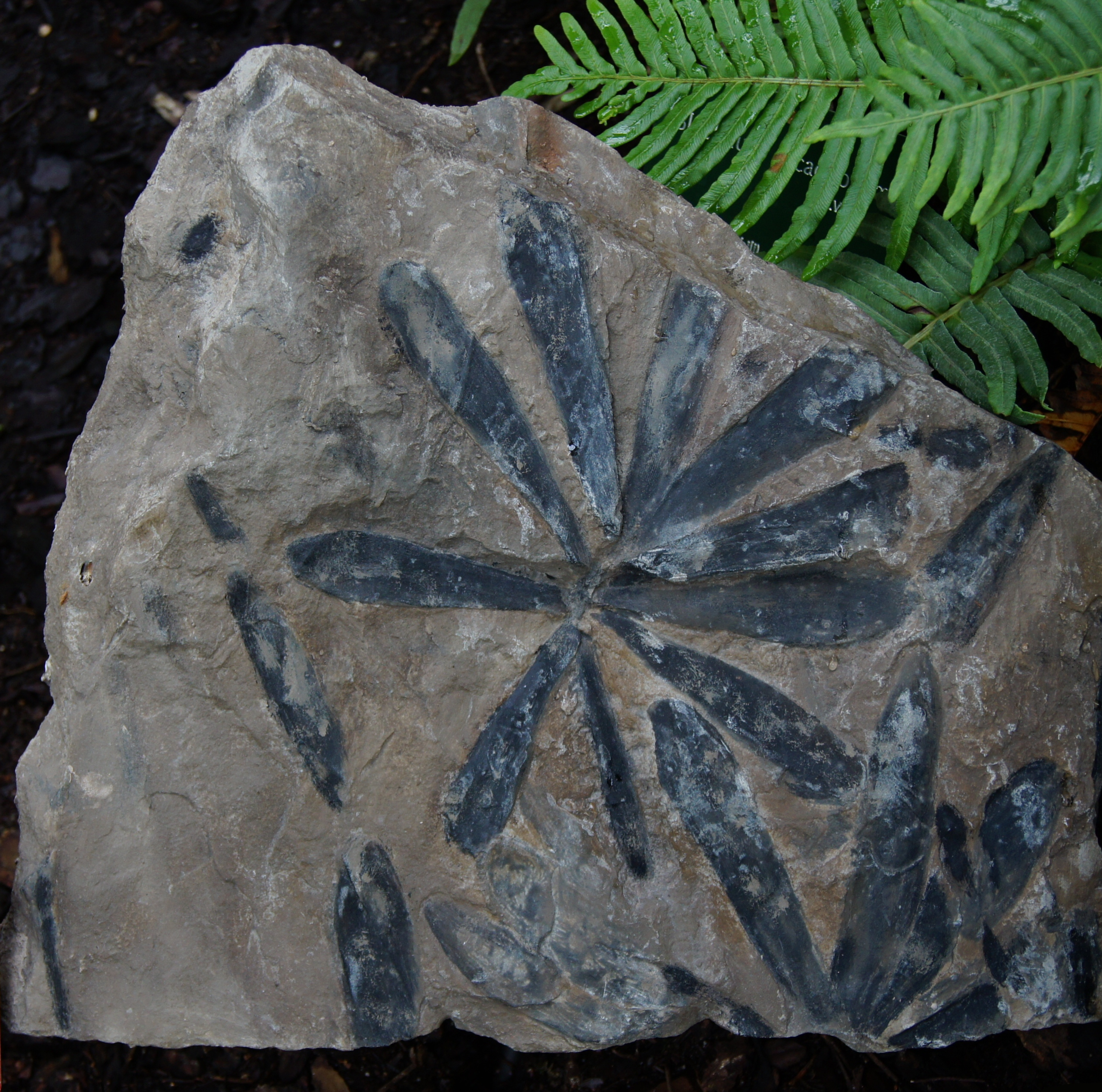
- Fossilized foliage of the Carboniferous-Permian conifer relative Cordaites
  †Cordaites
  - †Cordaites borassifolius
  - †Cordaites crassinervis
  - †Cordaites michiganensis
  - †Cordaites palmaeformis
  - †Cordaites principalis
  - †Cordaites Robbii – tentative report
- †Cornulites
  - †Cornulites corrugatus
  - †Cornulites flexuosus
  - †Cornulites sterlingensis – or unidentified comparable form
- †Corocrinus
  - †Corocrinus pettyesi
- †Corynepteris
  - †Corynepteris coralloides – tentative report
- †Cranaena
  - †Cranaena amygdaloidea – or unidentified related form
  - †Cranaena lincklaeni
  - †Cranaena romingeri
- †Crenulazona
  - †Crenulazona angulata
- †Cryptonella
- †Ctenodonta
  - †Ctenodonta iphigenia
- †Cuneamya
  - †Cuneamya miamiensis
- †Cupularostrum
  - †Cupularostrum prolificum
- †Cyclonema
  - †Cyclonema minuta
- †Cylindrophyllum
  - †Cylindrophyllum profundum
- †Cymatonota
  - †Cymatonota typicalis – or unidentified comparable form
- †Cyrtina
  - †Cyrtina alpenensis
  - †Cyrtina hamiltonensis – report made of unidentified related form or using admittedly obsolete nomenclature
  - †Cyrtina umbonata
- †Cyrtoceras – tentative report
- †Cyrtodonta
  - †Cyrtodonta grandis
  - †Cyrtodonta potteri
- †Cyrtolites
  - †Cyrtolites ornatus
- †Cyrtostropha
  - †Cyrtostropha salteri

== D ==
- †Dalmanella
  - †Dalmanella emacerata
  - †Dalmanella jugosa
- †Decorochilina
  - †Decorochilina robusta
- †Denayella
  - †Denayella bella – type locality for species
- †Devonalosia
  - †Devonalosia wrightorum
- †Devonochonetes
  - †Devonochonetes coronatus
  - †Devonochonetes fragilis
  - †Devonochonetes scitulus
- †Dictyobembix – type locality for genus
  - †Dictyobembix bella – type locality for species
- †Diplothmema
- †Discinites
  - †Discinites delectus
  - †Discinites jongmansi
- †Discosorus
  - †Discosorus ehlersi – type locality for species
  - †Discosorus halli – type locality for species
  - †Discosorus parksi – type locality for species
  - †Discosorus remotus – tentative report
- †Douvillina
  - †Douvillina distans
- †Duncanella – tentative report

== E ==
- †Echinocaris
  - †Echinocaris punctata
- †Echinocoelia
- †Elasmonema – tentative report
  - †Elasmonema corrugata
- †Eldredgeops
  - †Eldredgeops rana
- †Eliasopora
  - †Eliasopora stellatum
- †Elita
  - †Elita filicosta
- †Encrinurus
- †Endoceras
- †Eremopteris
  - †Eremopteris michiganensis
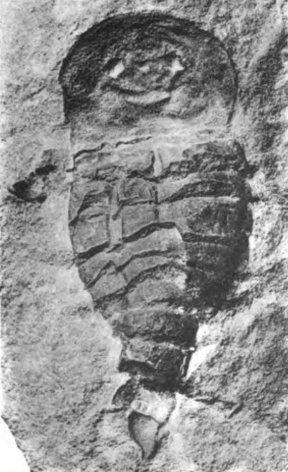
- Fossils (figures 2–10) of the Silurian-Devonian eurypterid ("sea scorpion") Erieopterus
  †Erieopterus
  - †Erieopterus microphthalmus
- †Euphemites – tentative report
  - †Euphemites devoniana
- †Euryzone
  - †Euryzone latitornata – type locality for species
  - †Euryzone pharkidopyndax – type locality for species
- †Euthyrhachis
  - †Euthyrhachis indianense

== F ==
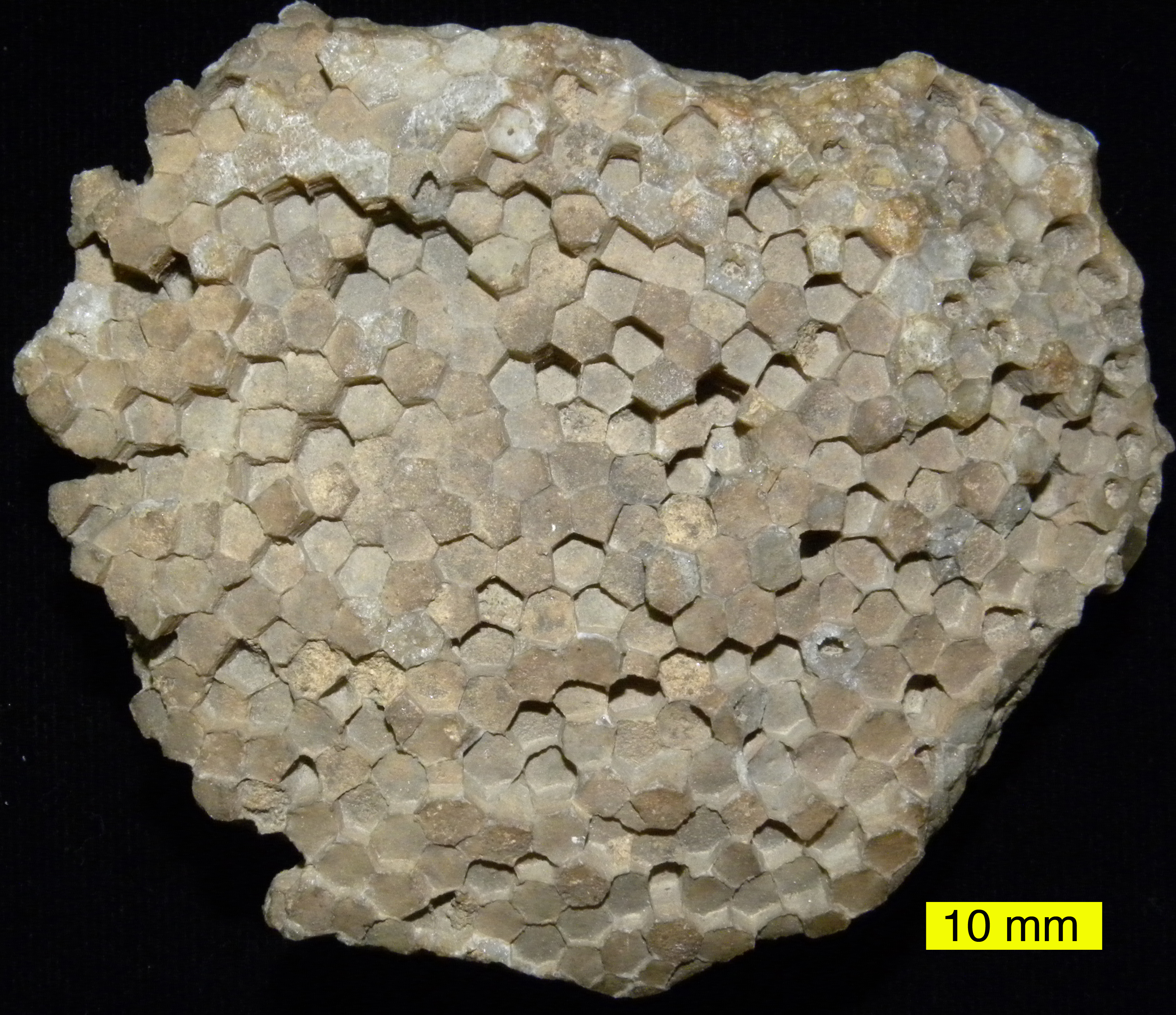
- Fossil of the Late Ordovician-Permian tabulate coral Favosites
  †Favosites
- †Ferganella
- †Flexicalymene
  - †Flexicalymene croneisi
  - †Flexicalymene magnipapilla – type locality for species
  - †Flexicalymene meeki – or unidentified comparable form
  - †Flexicalymene planilabra – type locality for species
  - †Flexicalymene praelongicephala – type locality for species
  - †Flexicalymene quadricapita – type locality for species
  - †Flexicalymene senaria
- †Floweria
  - †Floweria lirella

== G ==
- †Geniculograptus
  - †Geniculograptus pygmaeus
- †Gennaeocrinus
  - †Gennaeocrinus chilmanae
  - †Gennaeocrinus romingeri
- †Genuspira – type locality for genus
  - †Genuspira nodosa – type locality for species
- †Gigantopteris
  - †Gigantopteris dawsoni
  - †Gigantopteris kellyi
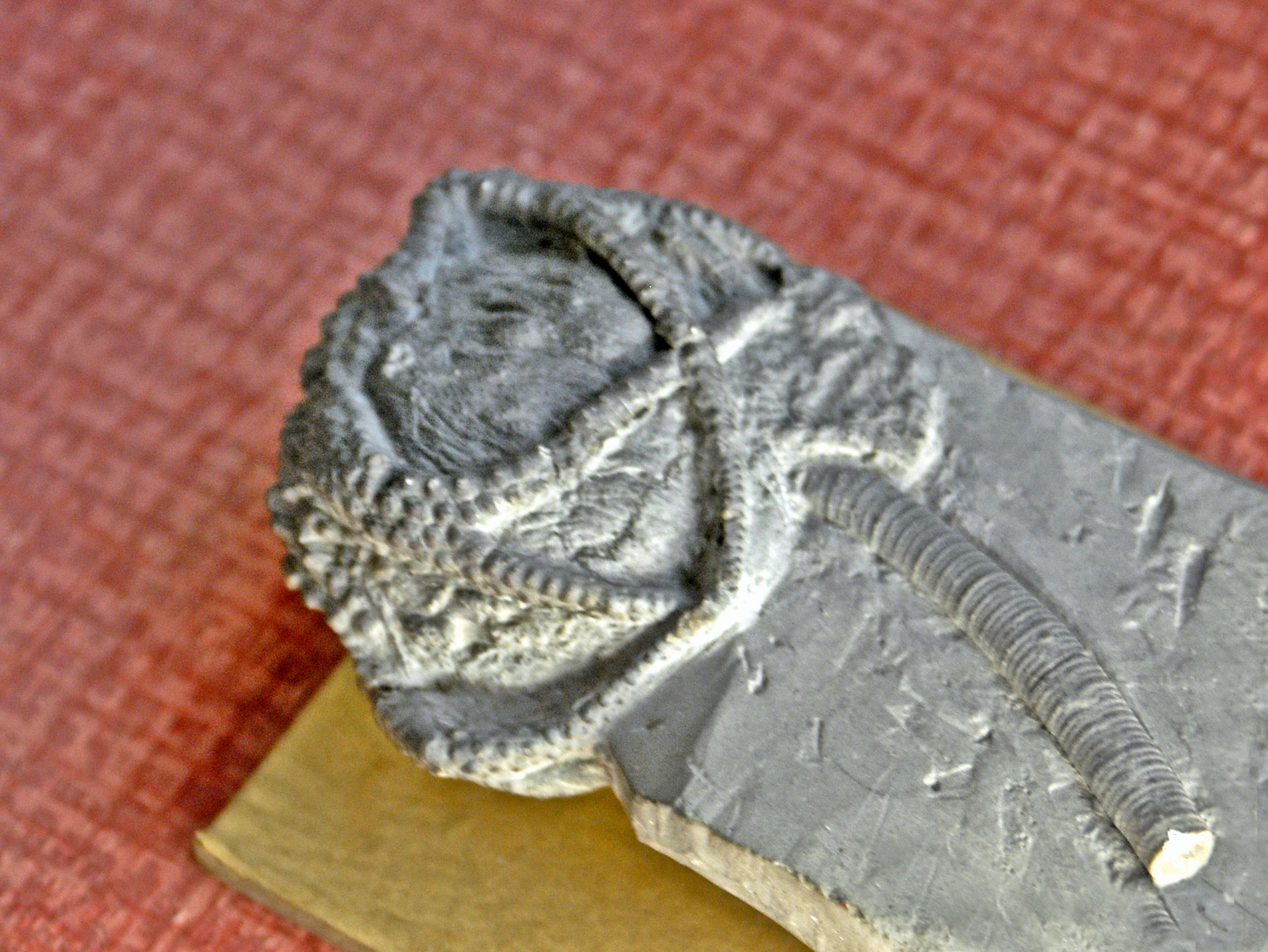
- Fossilized calyx and partial stem of the Devonian-Carboniferous crinoid ("sea lily") Gilbertsocrinus
  †Gilbertsocrinus
  - †Gilbertsocrinus ohioensis
- †Ginkgophyllum
  - †Ginkgophyllum grandifolium
- †Girvanella
  - †Girvanella richmondensis
- †Glossograptus
- †Grammysia
- †Graptodictya
  - †Graptodictya proava
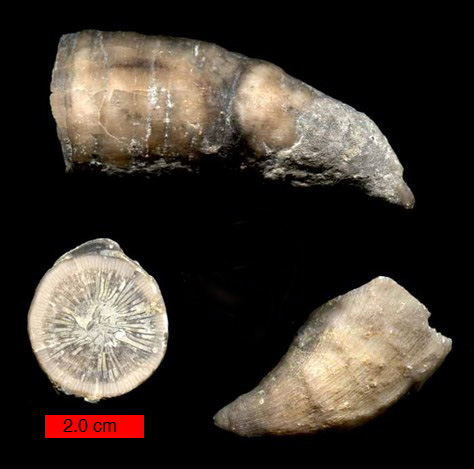
- Multiple views of a fossil of the Ordovician horn coral Grewingkia
  †Grewingkia
  - †Grewingkia canadensis
  - †Grewingkia deltensis
- †Gypidula
  - †Gypidula petoskeyensis

== H ==
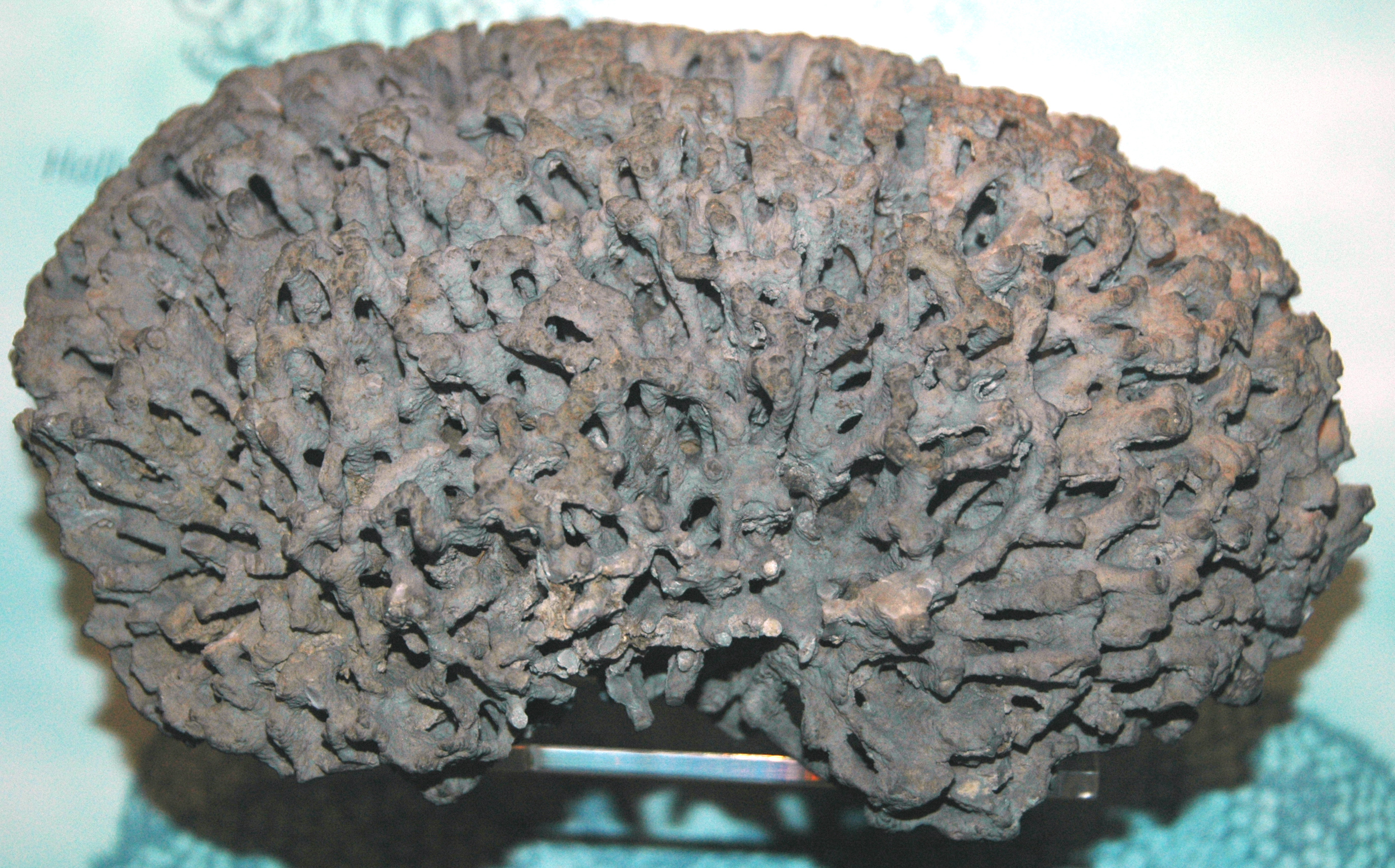
- Fossil of the Ordovician bryozoan ("moss animal") Hallopora
  †Hallopora
  - †Hallopora subnodosa
- †Halysites
  - †Halysites gracilis
- †Hebertella
  - †Hebertella alveata
  - †Hebertella occidentalis
- †Hederella
  - †Hederella alpenensis
  - †Hederella bilineata
  - †Hederella cirrhosa
  - †Hederella concinnoides
  - †Hederella delicatula
  - †Hederella filiformis
  - †Hederella magna
  - †Hederella parvirugosa
  - †Hederella rectifurcata
  - †Hederella reimanni
  - †Hederella stolonifera
  - †Hederella thedfordensis
  - †Hederella vagans
- †Helicelasma
  - †Helicelasma rusticum
- †Helicotoma
  - †Helicotoma brocki
- †Helopora
  - †Helopora inexpectata
- †Hercostrophia
  - †Hercostrophia robusta
- †Hesperorthis
  - †Hesperorthis tricenaria
- †Heterophrentis
  - †Heterophrentis simplex
- †Heterotrypa
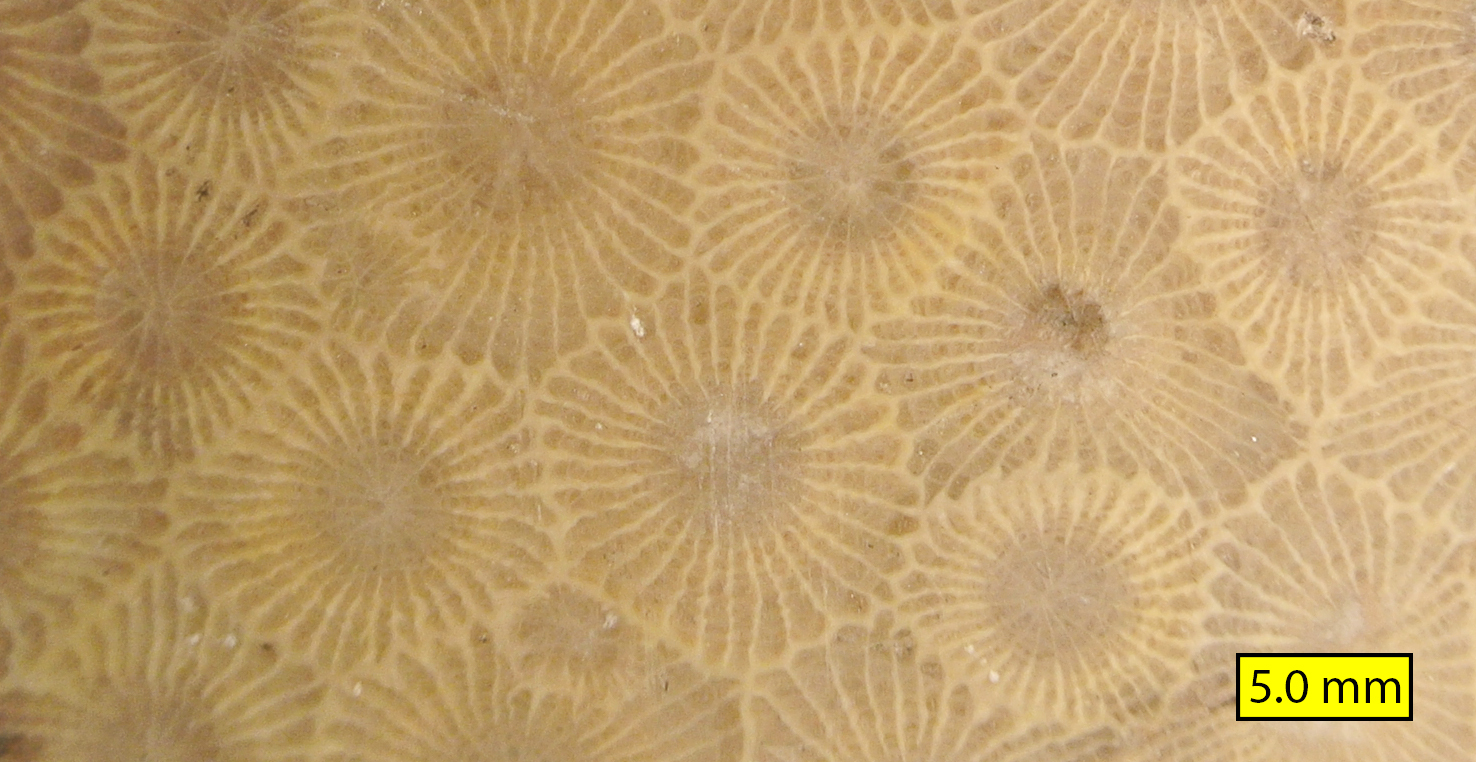
- Fossil of the Devonian colonial rugose coral Hexagonaria, also known as a Petoskey stone
  †Hexagonaria
  - †Hexagonaria pericarinata
- †Hindia
  - †Hindia subrotunda
- †Hippocardia
  - †Hippocardia monroica
- †Hippurograptus
- †Hiscobeccus
  - †Hiscobeccus capax
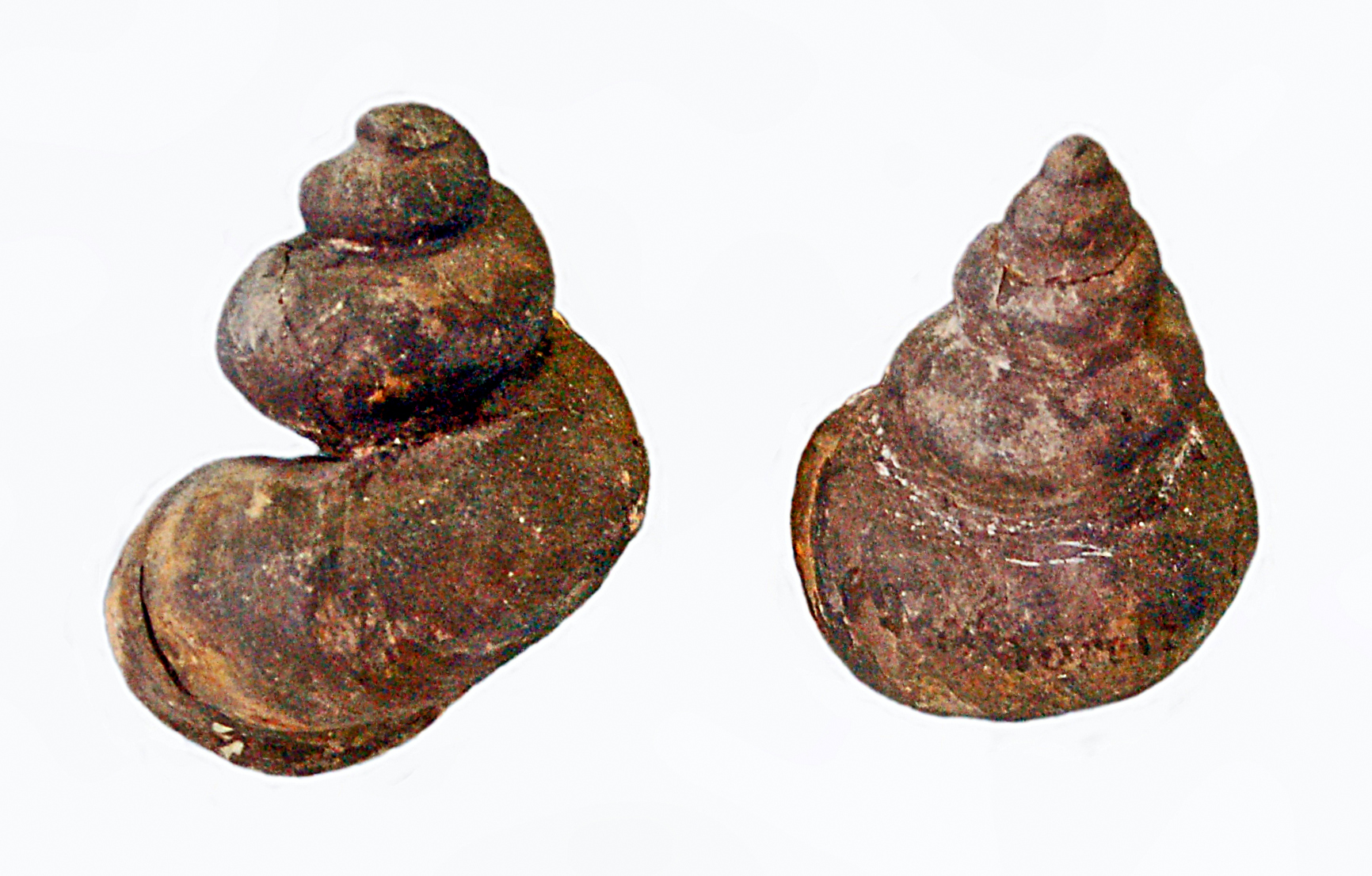
- Fossilized shells of the Ordovician-Carboniferous sea snail Holopea
  †Holopea
  - †Holopea hubbardi – or unidentified related form
- †Holtedahlina
  - †Holtedahlina sulcata
- †Hormotoma
  - †Hormotoma gracilis
- †Hormotomina
  - †Hormotomina penduliobesa
- †Howellella
- †Huronia
  - †Huronia annulata
  - †Huronia bigsbyi
    - †Huronia bigsbyi intermedia – type locality for variety
  - †Huronia distincta
  - †Huronia engadinensis – type locality for species
  - †Huronia minuens
  - †Huronia obliqua
  - †Huronia paulodilatata
  - †Huronia romingeri
  - †Huronia turbinata
  - †Huronia minuens
  - †Huronia vertebralis
- †Huroniella
  - †Huroniella ehlersi – type locality for species
- †Hyperoblastus
  - †Hyperoblastus reimanni
- †Hypomphalocirrus
  - †Hypomphalocirrus rugosus

== I ==
- †Icriodus
  - †Icriodus latericrescens
- †Illionia
- †Inocaulis
- †Intrapora
- †Isochilina
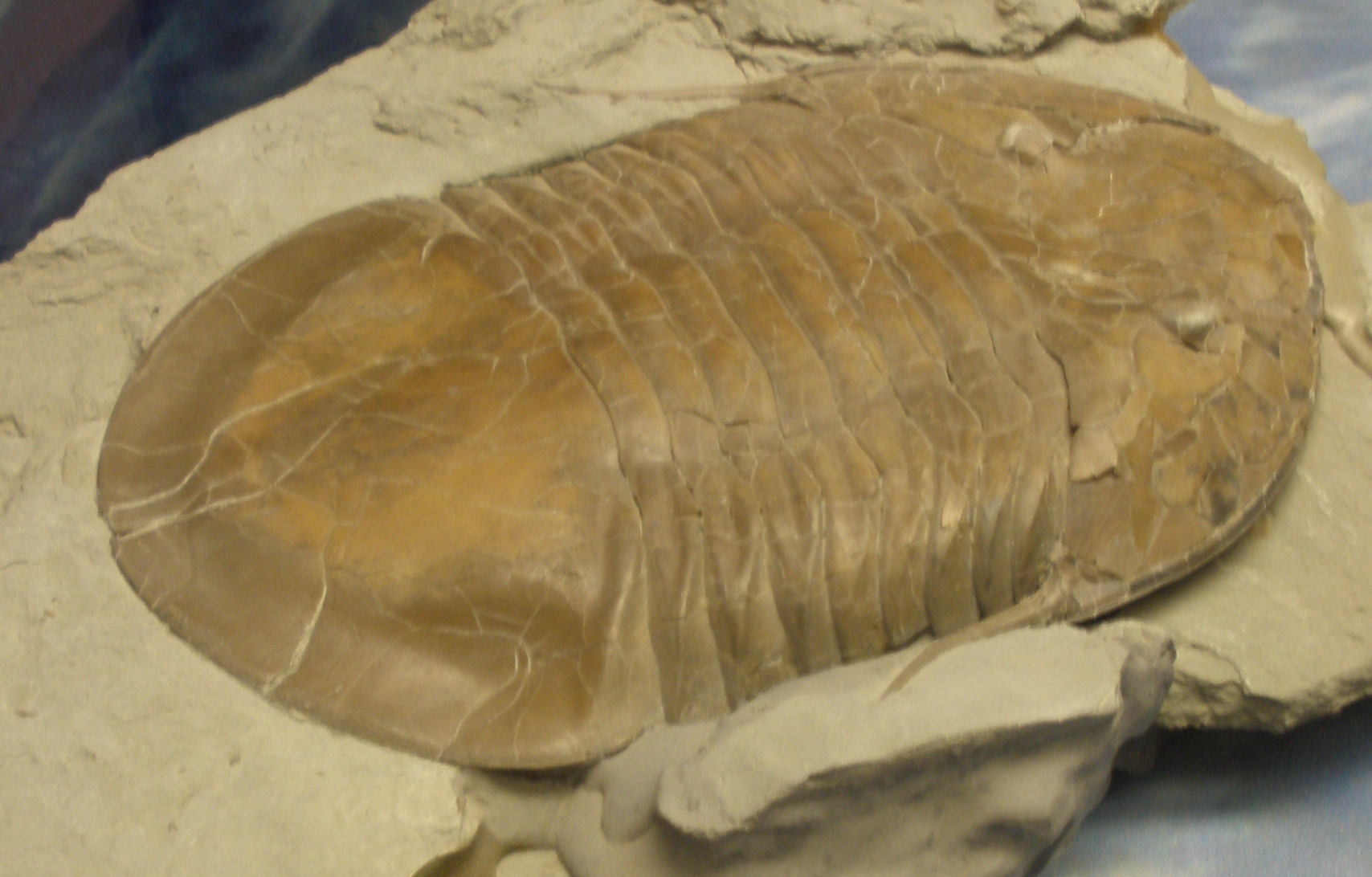
- Fossil of the Middle-Late Ordovician giant trilobite Isotelus.
  †Isotelus
  - †Isotelus gigas

== K ==
- †Kitikamispira
  - †Kitikamispira speciosum

== L ==
- †Leioclema
  - †Leioclema alpenense
- †Leiorhynchus
  - †Leiorhynchus kelloggi
  - †Leiorhynchus lucasi
- †Leperditia
- †Lepidocarpon
  - †Lepidocarpon linear
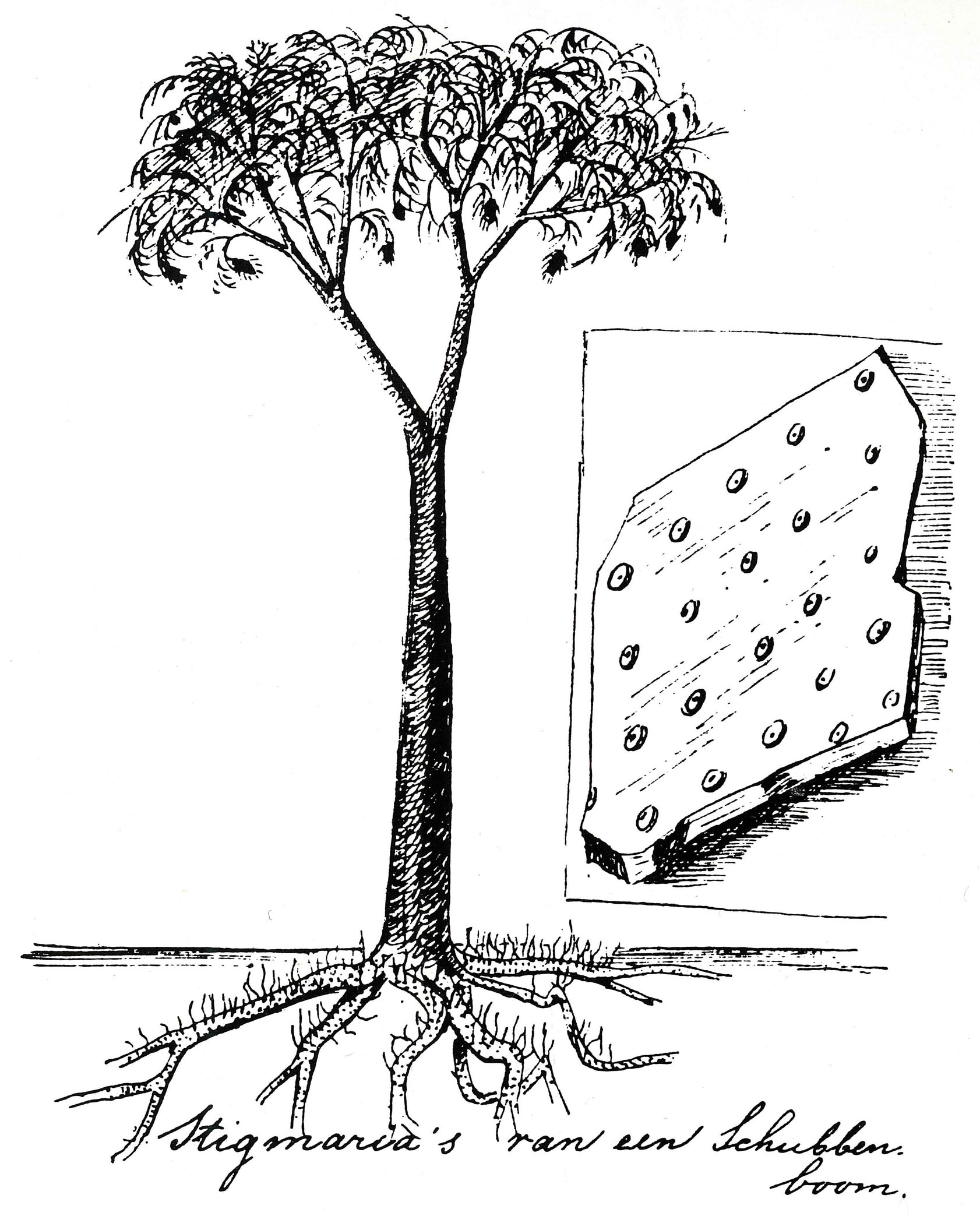
- Restoration of the Carboniferous-Late Triassic club moss relative Lepidodendron. Eli Heimans (1911).
  †Lepidodendron
  - †Lepidodendron aculeatum
  - †Lepidodendron Brittsii
  - †Lepidodendron dichotomum
  - †Lepidodendron lanceolatum
  - †Lepidodendron lycopodiodes
  - †Lepidodendron obovatum
  - †Lepidodendron obvatum
  - †Lepidodendron ophiurioides
  - †Lepidodendron vestitum
- †Lepidostrobus
  - †Lepidostrobus bartlettii
- †Leptaena
- †Leptalosia
  - †Leptalosia radicans
- †Leptobolus
  - †Leptobolus insignis
- †Leptolosia
  - †Leptolosia radicans
- †Leptotrypella
  - †Leptotrypella ohioensis
- †Lichenocrinus
  - †Lichenocrinus tuberculatus
- †Lingula
  - †Lingula changi
  - †Lingula cobourgensis
  - †Lingula ogontzensis
  - †Lingula progne – or unidentified comparable form
  - †Lingula whitfieldi – or unidentified comparable form
- †Liospira
  - †Liospira micula
- †Longispina
  - †Longispina lissohybus
- †Lophospira
  - †Lophospira milleri
  - †Lophospira perangulata – or unidentified related form
- †Lyopora
  - †Lyopora goldfussi

== M ==
- †Maelonoceras
  - †Maelonoceras ligarius
- †Manitobiella
  - †Manitobiella goniostoma
- †Mariopteris
  - †Mariopteris muricata
  - †Mariopteris nervosa
- †Mastigograptus
- †Mastigospira
  - †Mastigospira ingens – type locality for species
  - †Mastigospira intermedia – type locality for species
- †Mediospirifer
  - †Mediospirifer audaculus
- †Megastrophia
  - †Megastrophia concava
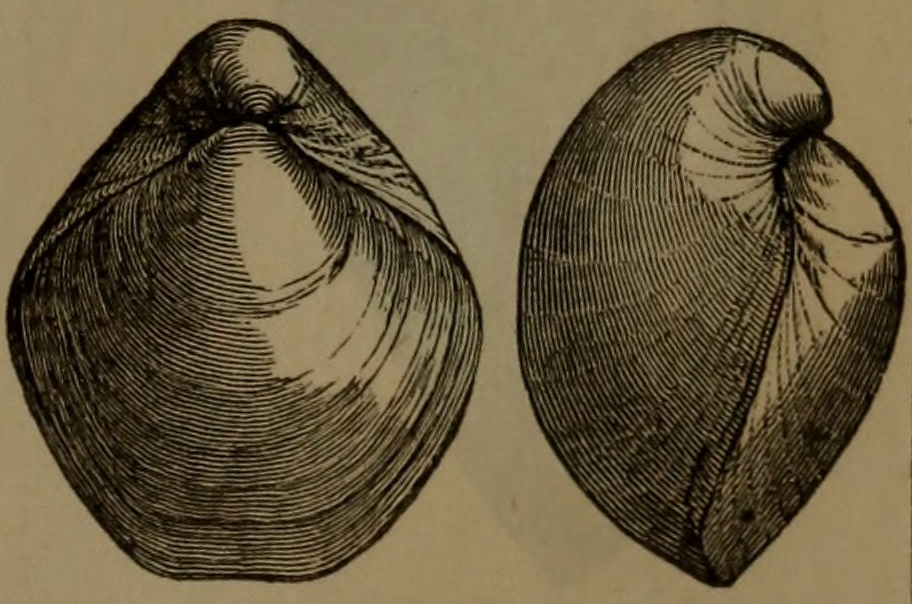
- Illustration (lower right, entry 15) of a fossilized shell in front and side views of the Silurian-Late Devonian brachiopod Meristella
  †Meristella
- †Mesocoelia
  - †Mesocoelia obstipisutura
  - †Mesocoelia priscum
- †Mesotrypa
- †Modiolopsis
  - †Modiolopsis noquettensis
  - †Modiolopsis valida
- †Monticulipora
  - †Monticulipora epidermata
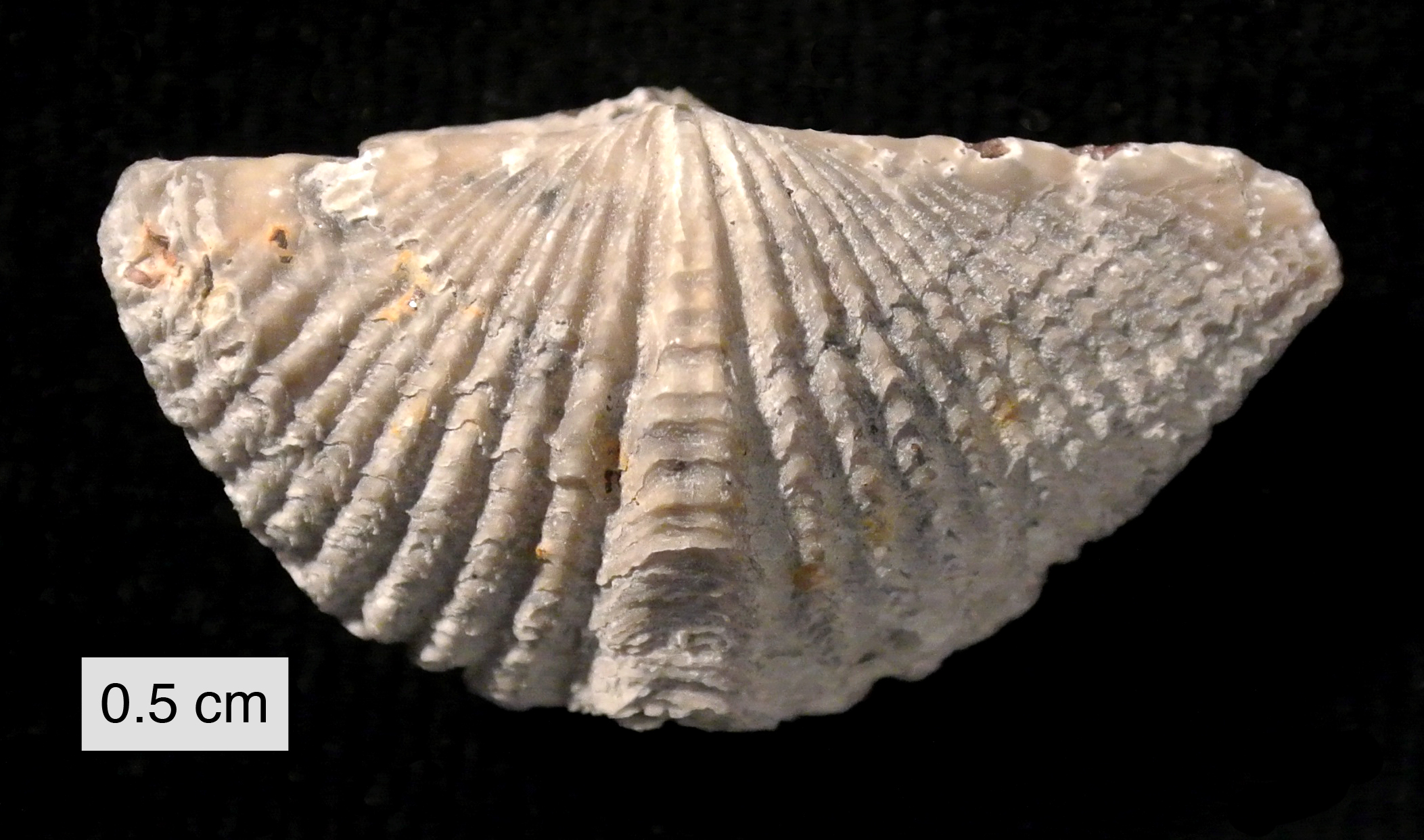
- Fossilized shell of the Devonian brachiopod Mucrospirifer
  †Mucrospirifer
  - †Mucrospirifer attenuatus
  - †Mucrospirifer grabaui
  - †Mucrospirifer latus
  - †Mucrospirifer mucronatus
  - †Mucrospirifer profundus
  - †Mucrospirifer prolificus
  - †Mucrospirifer thedfordensis
- †Murchisonia
  - †Murchisonia akidota
  - †Murchisonia anderdoniae
  - †Murchisonia deludisubzona – type locality for species
  - †Murchisonia dowlingii
  - †Murchisonia gracilicrista
  - †Murchisonia sibleyensis
  - †Murchisonia subcarinata
  - †Murchisonia subulata – type locality for species

== N ==
- †Naticopsis
  - †Naticopsis manitobensis
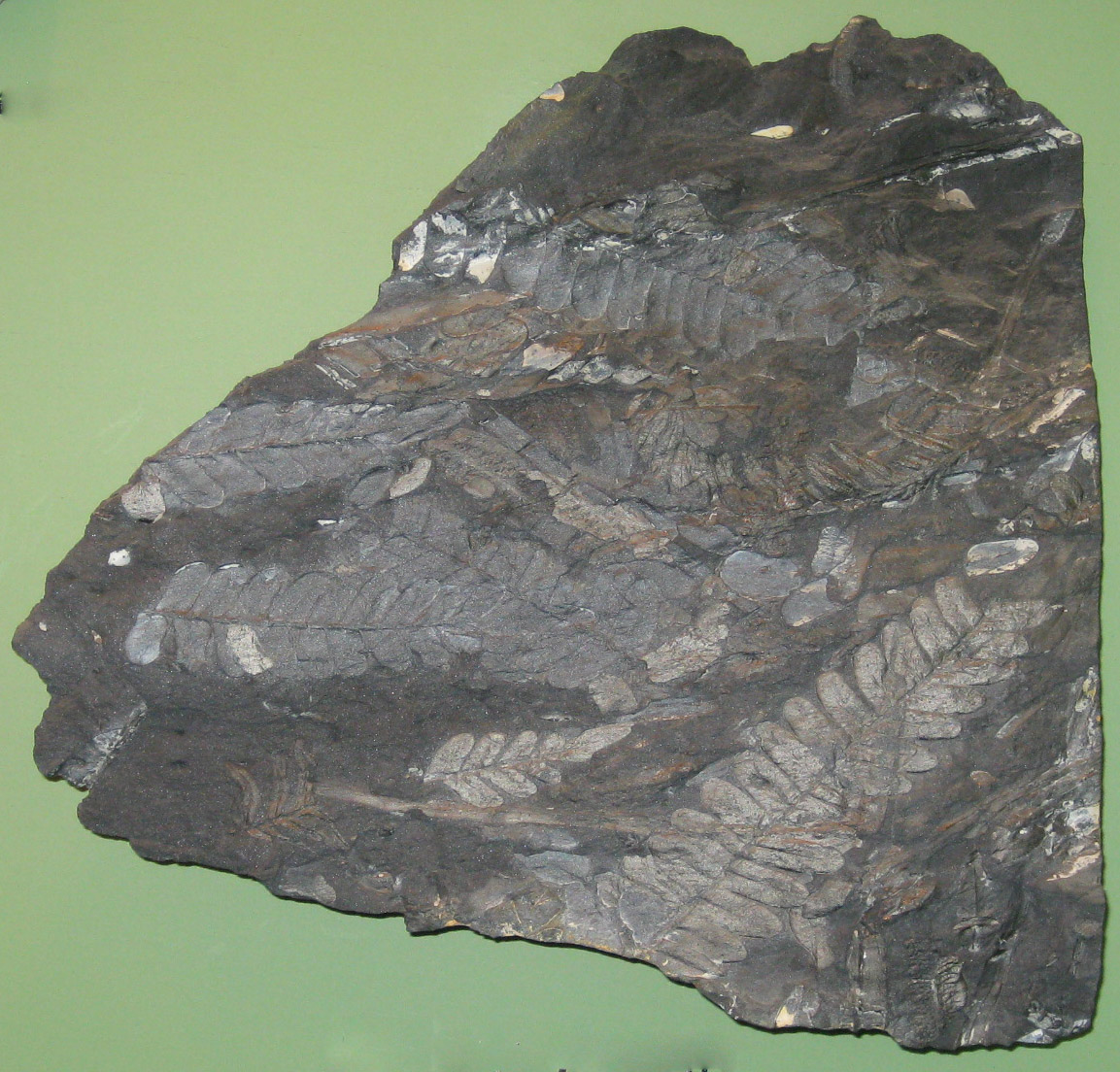
- Fronds of the Carboniferous seed fern Neuropteris
  †Neuropteris
  - †Neuropteris caudata
  - †Neuropteris dilitata
  - †Neuropteris flexuosa
  - †Neuropteris gigntea – tentative report
  - †Neuropteris harrisi – or unidentified comparable form
  - †Neuropteris heterophylla – or unidentified comparable form
  - †Neuropteris obliqua
  - †Neuropteris rarinervis
  - †Neuropteris saginawensis
  - †Neuropteris scheuchzeri
  - †Neuropteris Schlehani
  - †Neuropteris tenuifolia
- †Nodonema
  - †Nodonema granulatum
- †Nowakia
- †Nuculites
  - †Nuculites neglectus
- †Nuculoidea
  - †Nuculoidea lirata – or unidentified comparable form

== O ==
- †Odontopteris
- †Oenonites
  - †Oenonites curvidens – or unidentified related form
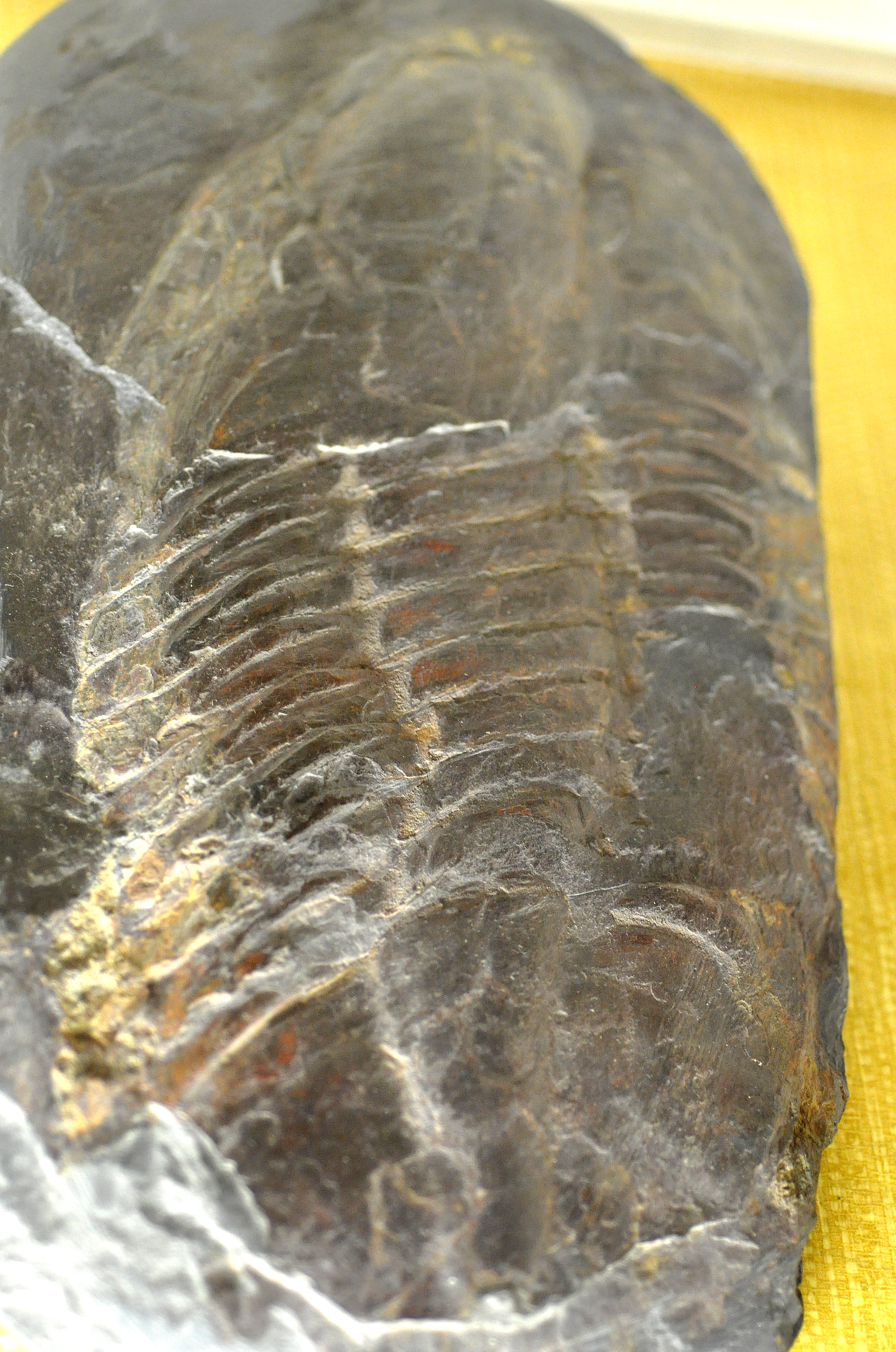
- Fossil of the Ordovician trilobite Ogygites
  †Ogygites
  - †Ogygites latimarginatus
- †Oligorachs
  - †Oligorachs littletonensis
- †Omphalocirrus
- †Onchometopus
- †Oncoceras
- †Ophisthoptera
  - †Ophisthoptera casei – or unidentified comparable form
- †Ophistoloba
  - †Ophistoloba gouldi
- †Opisthoptera
  - †Opisthoptera gouldi
  - †Opisthoptera griffini
- †Opisthopteri
  - †Opisthopteri casei – or unidentified comparable form
- †Orbiculoidea
- †Ormoceras
  - †Ormoceras bayfieldi
  - †Ormoceras whitei
- †Orthoceras
  - †Orthoceras alienum – or unidentified comparable form
- †Orthodesma
  - †Orthodesma subangulatum – or unidentified comparable form
- †Orthograptus
  - †Orthograptus eucharis
  - †Orthograptus quadrimucronatus
  - †Orthograptus truncatus
- †Orthonota
  - †Orthonota parvula
  - †Orthonota undulata
- †Orthonychia
  - †Orthonychia variablis – type locality for species
- †Orthopleura
  - †Orthopleura B Imbrie – informal
- †Oxoplecia – or unidentified comparable form
  - †Oxoplecia calhouni

== P ==
- †Pachydictya
- †Pagodea
  - †Pagodea falcatinoda – type locality for species
- †Palaeopteridium
  - †Palaeopteridium Reussi
- †Palaeoscurria – tentative report
- †Palaeozygopleura
  - †Palaeozygopleura hamiltoniae
  - †Palaeozygopleura joani
  - †Palaeozygopleura sibleyensis
- †Paleofavosites
  - †Paleofavosites asper
- †Palmatopteris
  - †Palmatopteris furcata
- †Panenka
  - †Panenka canadensis
- †Papillicalymene
  - †Papillicalymene husseyi – type locality for species
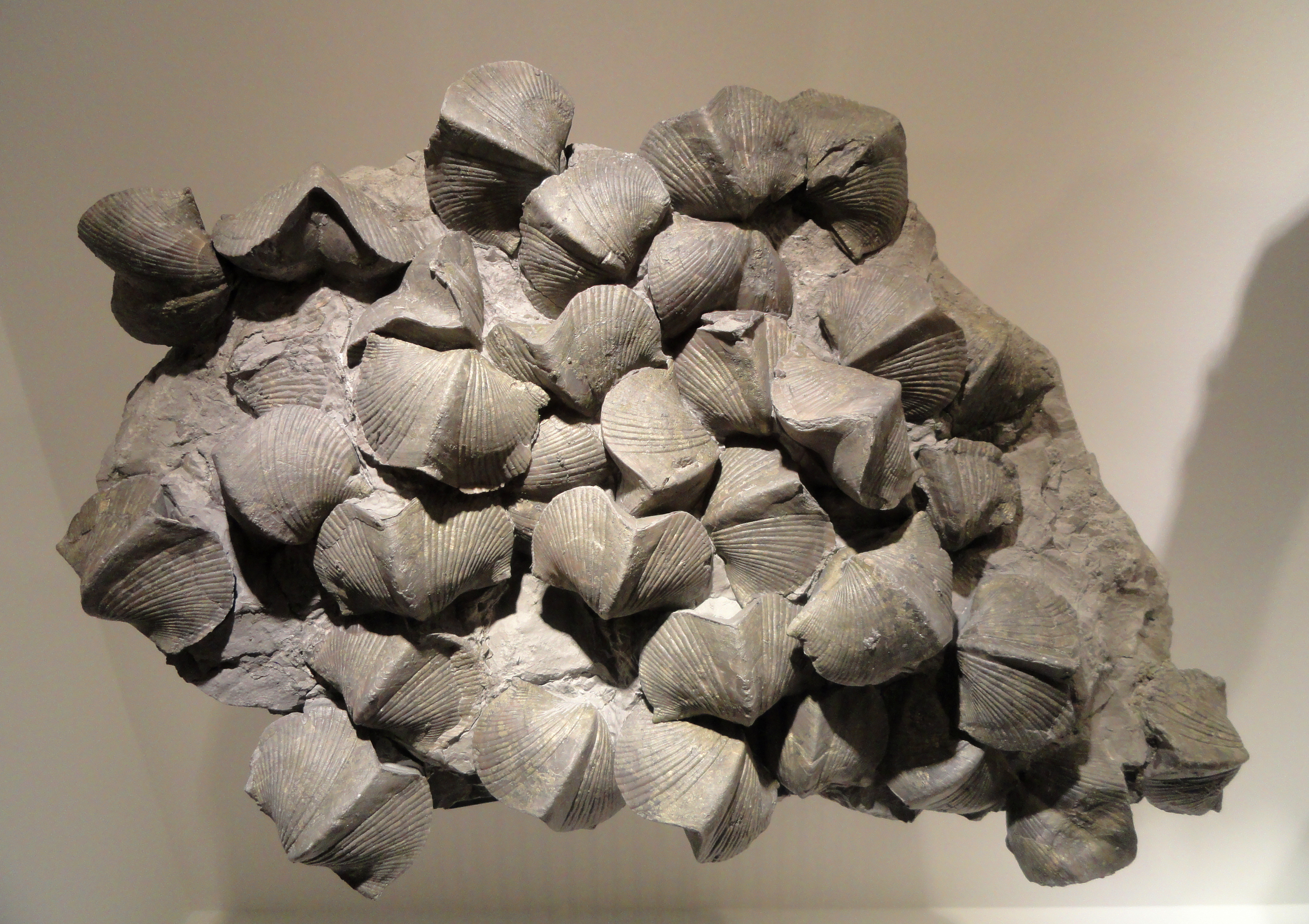
- Assemblage of the Early-Middle Devonian brachiopod Paraspirifer
  †Paraspirifer
  - †Paraspirifer bownockeri
- †Paupospira
  - †Paupospira bowdeni
  - †Paupospira tropidophora
- †Pecopteris
  - †Pecopteris dentata – tentative report
  - †Pecopteris miltoni
- †Penniretepora
  - †Penniretepora irregularis – or unidentified comparable form
- †Pentamerella
  - †Pentamerella athyroides
  - †Pentamerella aulax
  - †Pentamerella papilla
  - †Pentamerella pericosta
  - †Pentamerella petoskeyensis
  - †Pentamerella proteus
  - †Pentamerella E – informal
- †Pentameroides
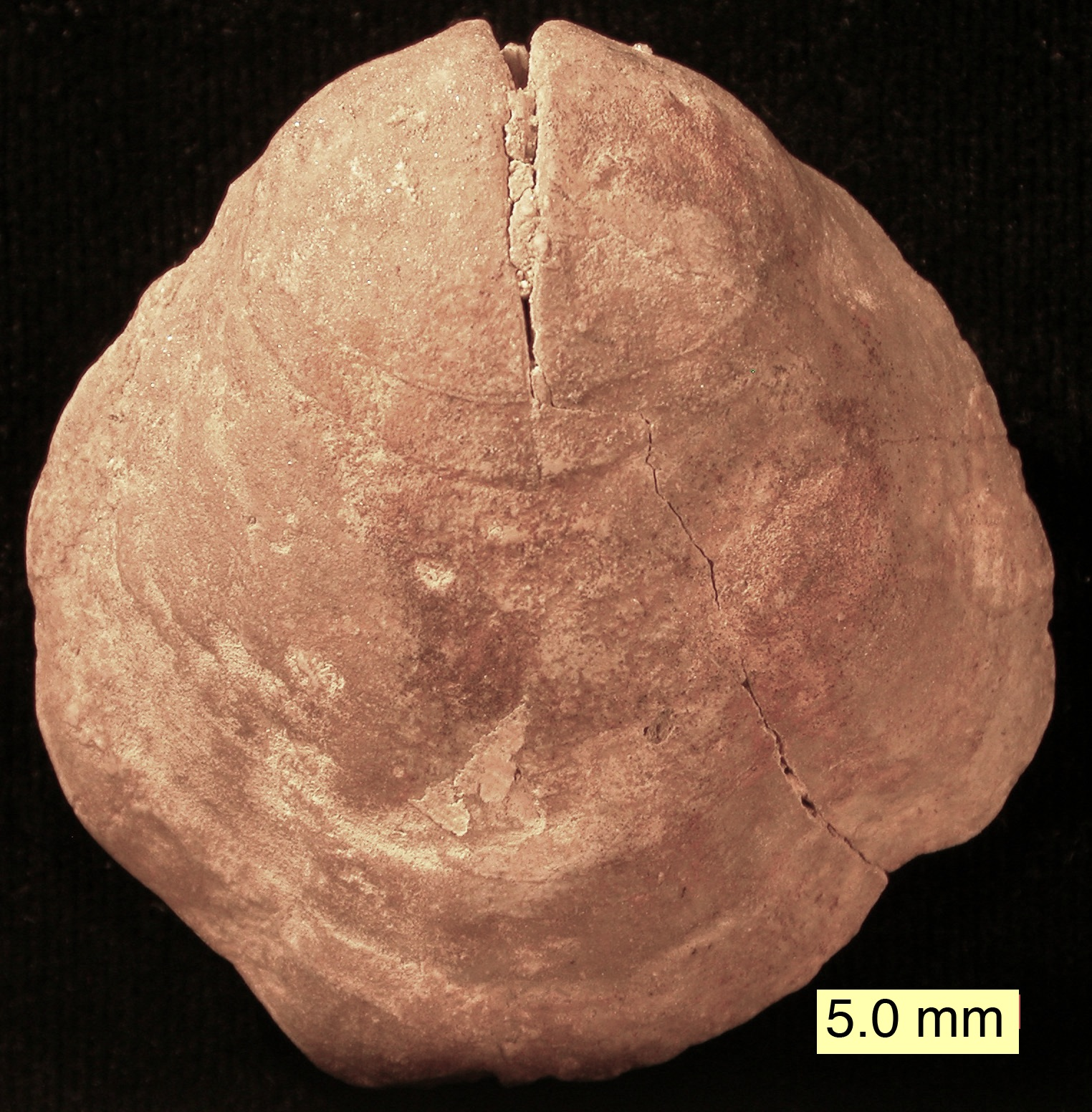
- Fossilized shell of the Silurian-Middle Devonian brachiopod Pentamerus
  †Pentamerus
- †Peronopora
  - †Peronopora decipiens
- †Petrochus
  - †Petrochus conica – type locality for species
  - †Petrochus mellaria – type locality for species
- †Petrocrania
  - †Petrocrania scabiosa
- †Pholadomorpha
  - †Pholadomorpha pholadiformis
- †Pholidops
  - †Pholidops subtruncata
- †Pholidostrophia
  - †Pholidostrophia geniculata
  - †Pholidostrophia gracilis
  - †Pholidostrophia nacrea
  - †Pholidostrophia ovata
- †Phragmolites
  - †Phragmolites slawsoni
- †Physostoma
  - †Physostoma winchellii
  - †Physostoma Winchellii
- †Plaesiomys
  - †Plaesiomys subquadrata
- †Planalveolitella
  - †Planalveolitella parasitica
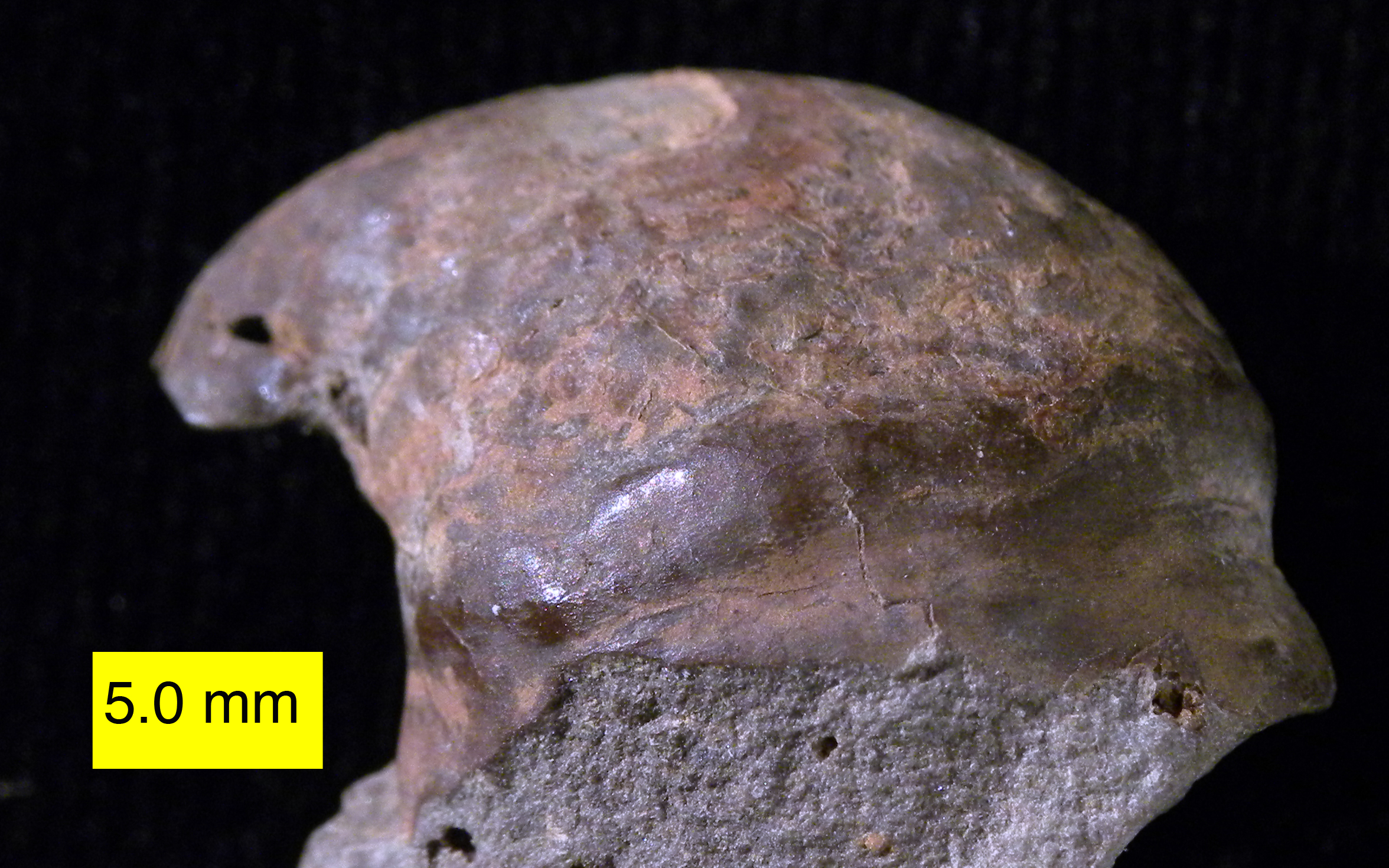
- Fossilized shell of the Silurian-Early Triassic sea snail Platyceras
  †Platyceras
  - †Platyceras bucculentum
  - †Platyceras carinatum
  - †Platyceras rarispinum
- †Platystrophia
  - †Platystrophia acutilirata
  - †Platystrophia annieana
  - †Platystrophia clarkesvillensis
  - †Platystrophia clarksvillensis
  - †Platystrophia cypha – or unidentified related form
  - †Platystrophia moritura
- †Plectambonites
  - †Plectambonites rugosus
  - †Plectambonites sericeus
- †Plectonotus
  - †Plectonotus raricostatus
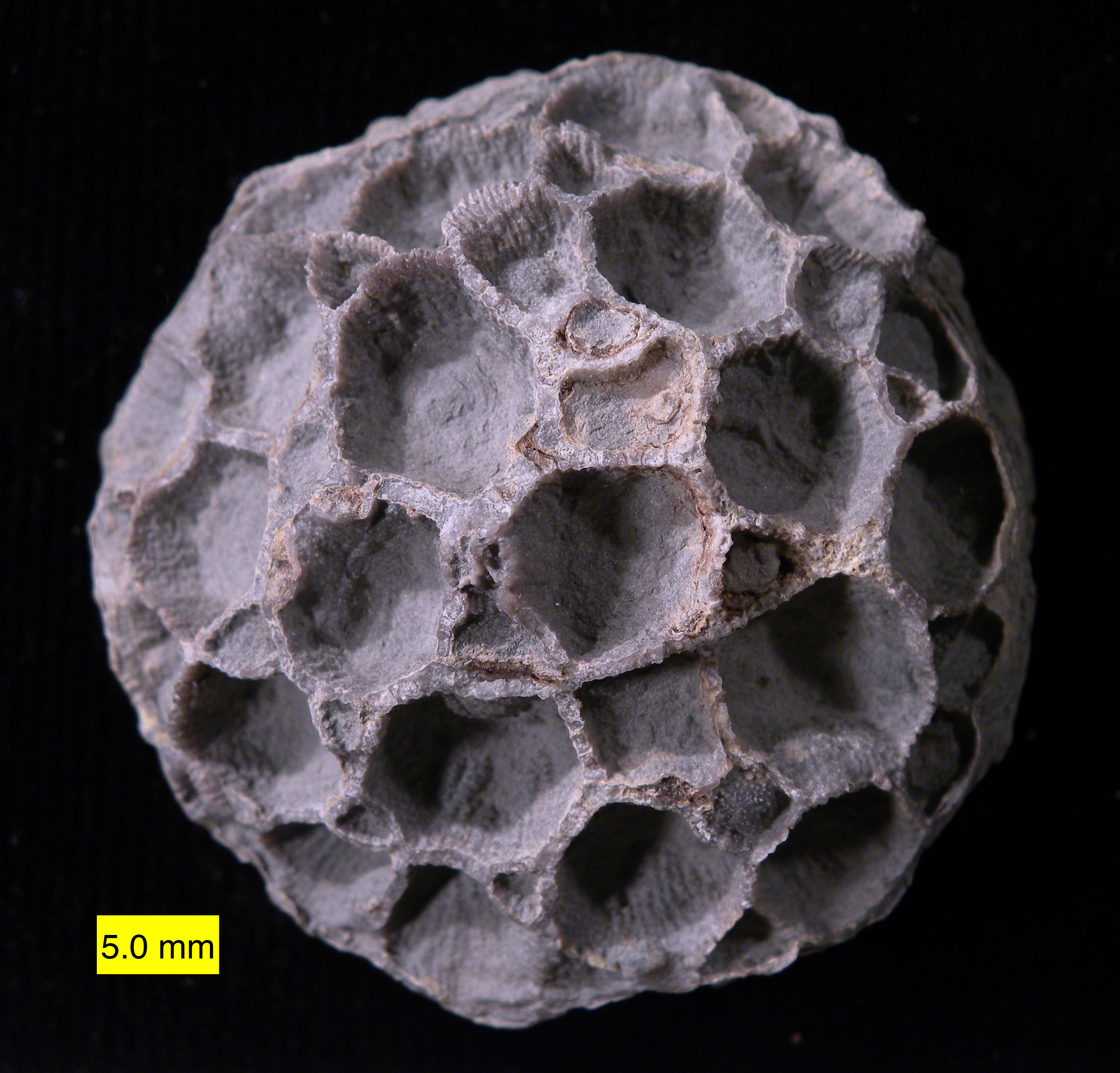
- Fossil of the Silurian-Carboniferous tabulate coral Pleurodictyum
  †Pleurodictyum
  - †Pleurodictyum cornu
- †Polygnathus
  - †Polygnathus varcus
- †Primitia
  - †Primitia cincinnatiensis
- †Primitiella
  - †Primitiella stoningtonensis
  - †Primitiella unicornis
- Proboscina
  - †Proboscina auloporoides
- †Productella
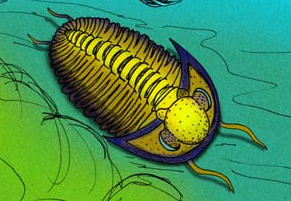
- Restoration of the Silurian trilobite Proetus
  †Proetus
  - †Proetus chambliensis
- †Prosserella
  - †Prosserella subtransversa
- †Protaraea
  - †Protaraea richmondensis
- †Protarea
  - †Protarea richmondensis
- †Protokionoceras
- †Protoleptostrophia
  - †Protoleptostrophia lirella
  - †Protoleptostrophia perplana
- †Pseudoatrypa
  - †Pseudoatrypa devoniana – or unidentified comparable form
- †Pseudomphalotrochus
  - †Pseudomphalotrochus cottrelli – type locality for species
  - †Pseudomphalotrochus gibsoni – type locality for species
- †Pseudopecopteris
  - †Pseudopecopteris avoldensis – or unidentified comparable form
- †Psiloconcha
  - †Psiloconcha subovalis
- †Pterinea
  - †Pterinea demissa
  - †Pterinea insueta – or unidentified related form
  - †Pterinea insuetta – or unidentified related form
- †Ptychomphalina
  - †Ptychomphalina lucina – tentative report
- †Ptychopteria
  - †Ptychopteria fasciulatus
  - †Ptychopteria michiganesis
  - †Ptychopteria swanni
- †Pugnoides

== R ==
- †Rafinesquina
  - †Rafinesquina alternata
  - †Rafinesquina breviusculus
  - †Rafinesquina pregibbosa
- †Rafinesquna
  - †Rafinesquna pregibbosa
- †Rectograptus
  - †Rectograptus amplexicaulis
  - †Rectograptus peosta
- †Retispira
  - †Retispira sullivani
- †Rhabdocarpus
  - †Rhabdocarpus mammilaris
  - †Rhabdocarpus mansfieldi
  - †Rhabdocarpus multistriatus
- †Rhinocaris
  - †Rhinocaris ehlersi
- †Rhipidomella
  - †Rhipidomella penelope – or unidentified comparable form
  - †Rhipidomella trigona
  - †Rhipidomella vanuxemi
- †Rhipidothyris
  - †Rhipidothyris B – informal
- †Rhombotrypa
  - †Rhombotrypa quadrata
  - †Rhombotrypa subquadrata
- †Rhynchospirina
- †Rhynchotrema
  - †Rhynchotrema minnesotensis – or unidentified comparable form
  - †Rhynchotrema perlamellosum
- †Rugomena
  - †Rugomena vetusta
- †Rutkowskicrinus
  - †Rutkowskicrinus collieri – type locality for species
  - †Rutkowskicrinus patriciae
- †Rutkowskiella – type locality for genus
  - †Rutkowskiella tumula – type locality for species

== S ==
- †Samaropsis
  - †Samaropsis Newberryi
  - †Samaropsis newberryi
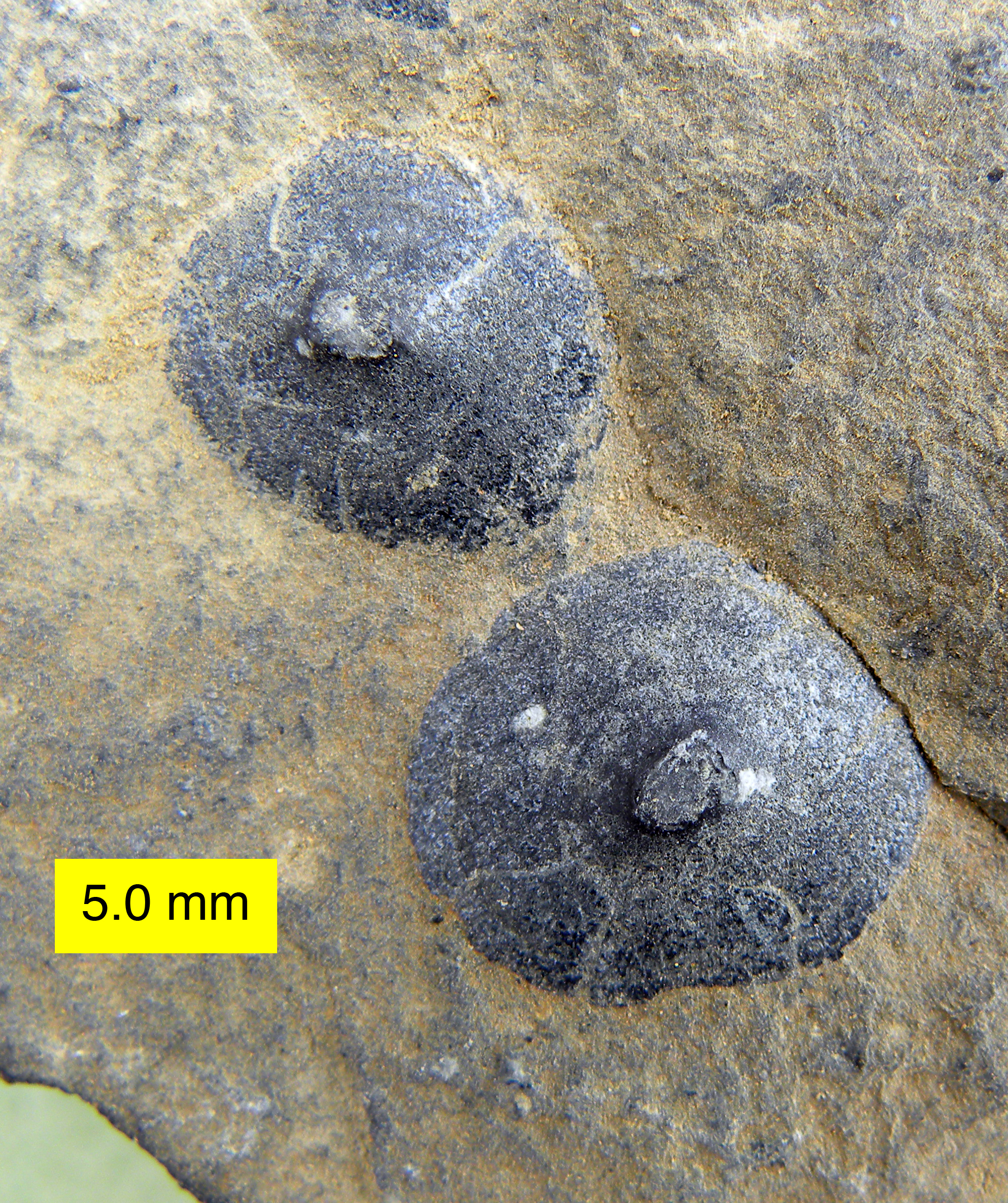
- Fossils of the Cambrian mollusc Scenella
  †Scenella – tentative report
- †Schizophoria
  - †Schizophoria ferronensis
  - †Schizophoria mesacarina
  - †Schizophoria tulliensis
- †Schuchertella
- †Scutellum
- †Semicoscinium
- †Semipora – tentative report
  - †Semipora ehlersi
- †Serpulospira
  - †Serpulospira diversiformis
- †Sigillaria
- †Sinuites
- †Spermatites
  - †Spermatites cylix
  - †Spermatites globosus
  - †Spermatites reticulatus
- †Sphenophragmus
  - †Sphenophragmus nanus
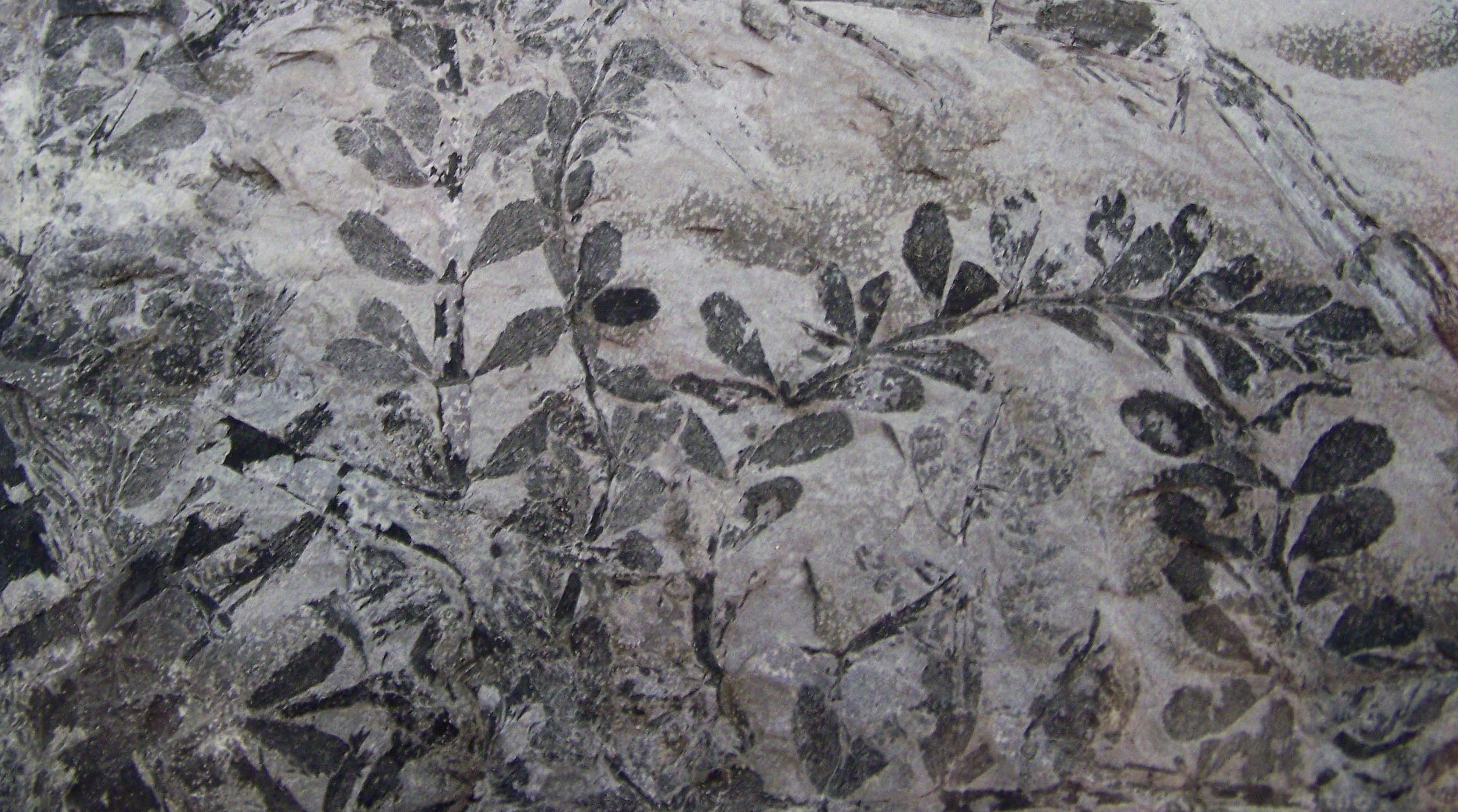
- Fossilized leaves and branches of the Devonian-Triassic horsetail relative Sphenophyllum
  †Sphenophyllum
  - †Sphenophyllum bifurcatum
  - †Sphenophyllum cuneifolium
  - †Sphenophyllum emarginatum
  - †Sphenophyllum majus
  - †Sphenophyllum saxifragaefolium
- †Sphenopteris
- †Sphenopters
- †Spinocyrtia
  - †Spinocyrtia clintoni
  - †Spinocyrtia euryteines – report made of unidentified related form or using admittedly obsolete nomenclature
  - †Spinocyrtia granulosa
- †Spinulicosta
  - †Spinulicosta mutocosta
  - †Spinulicosta spinulicosta
- †Spinyplatyceras
  - †Spinyplatyceras bartlettense
- †Spirifer – report made of unidentified related form or using admittedly obsolete nomenclature
  - †Spirifer consors
- †Spyroceras
- †Stereotoechus
  - †Stereotoechus typicus – or unidentified comparable form
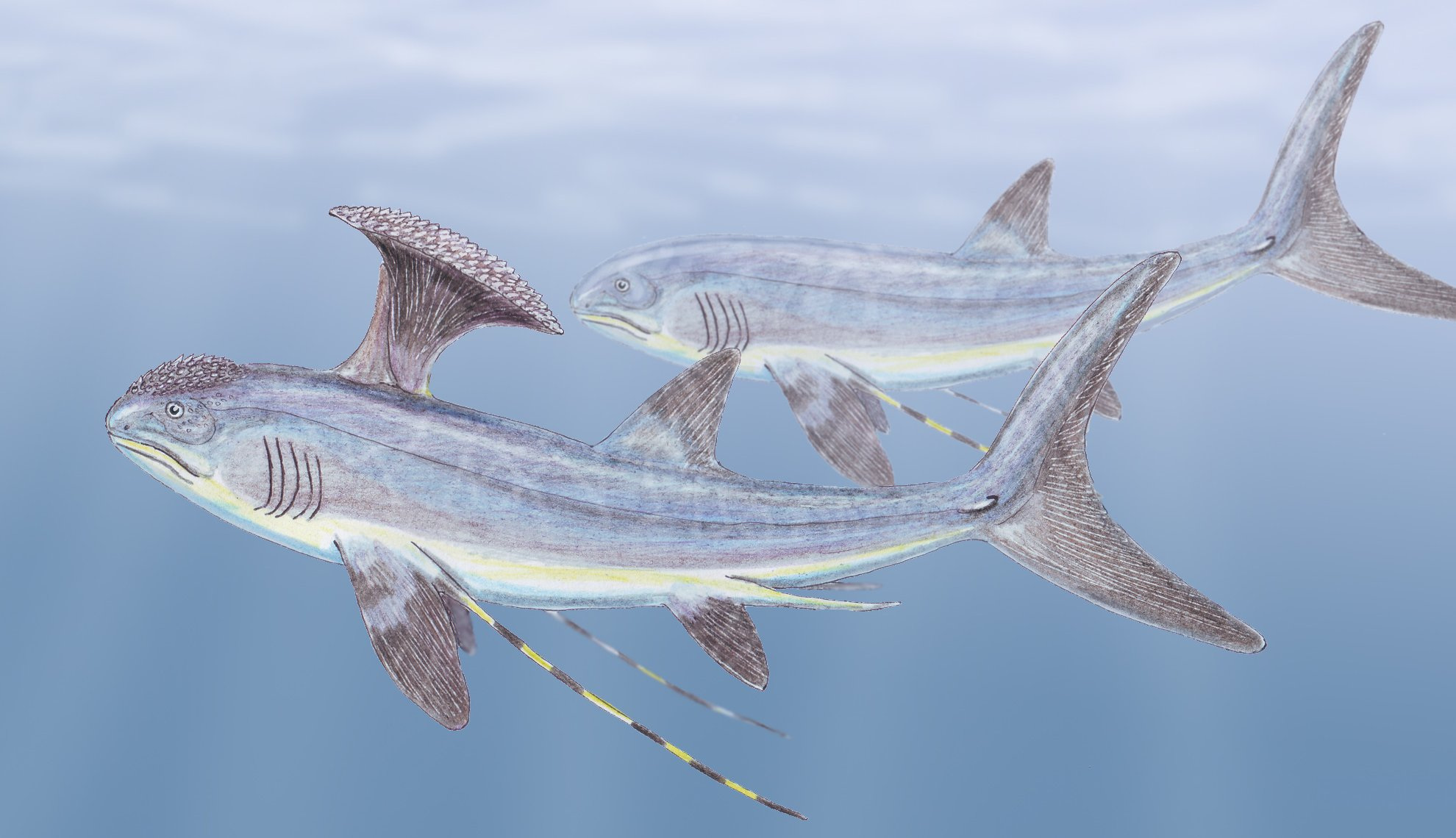
- Life restorations of a male (foreground) and female (background) of the Late Devonian-Carboniferous Chimaera relative Stethacanthus
  †Stethacanthus
  - †Stethacanthus depressus
- †Stictoporina
  - †Stictoporina granulifera
- †Stigmaria
  - †Stigmaria verrucosa
- †Stigmatella
- †Stokesoceras
  - †Stokesoceras engadinense – type locality for species
  - †Stokesoceras gracile
  - †Stokesoceras romingeri – type locality for species
- †Straparollus
  - †Straparollus mortoni – type locality for species
- †Streblotrypa
  - †Streblotrypa anomala
  - †Streblotrypa hamiltonensis
- †Streptelasm
  - †Streptelasm rusticum
- †Streptelasma
  - †Streptelasma divaricans
  - †Streptelasma huronensis
- †Striatopora
  - †Striatopora linneana
- †Strobeus
  - †Strobeus alternatus
- †Stromatocerium
  - †Stromatocerium huronense
- †Stropheodonta
  - †Stropheodonta demissa – or unidentified comparable form
- †Strophodonta
  - †Strophodonta demissa
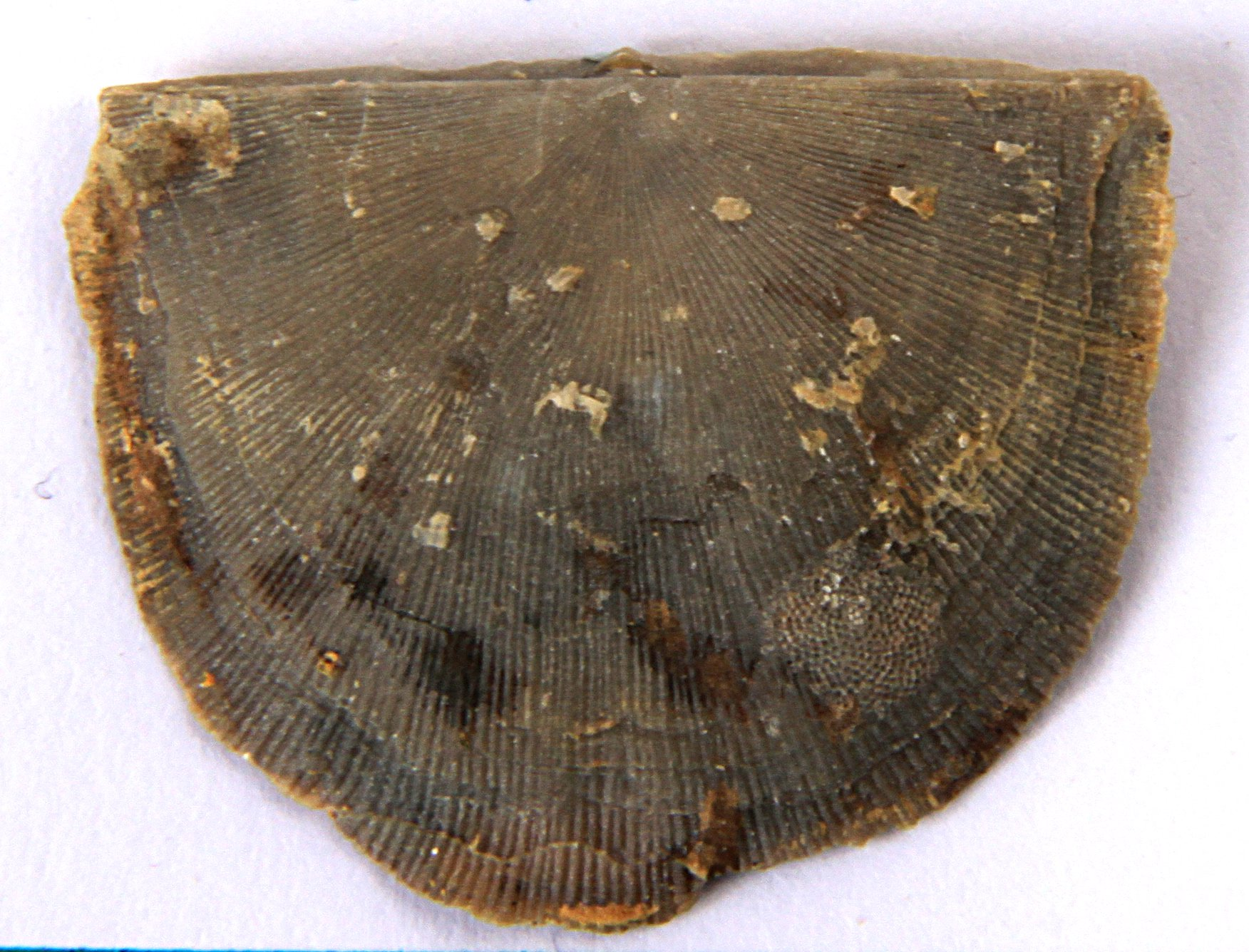
- Fossilized shell of the Ordovician-Silurian brachiopod Strophomena
  †Strophomena
  - †Strophomena alpenensis
  - †Strophomena costata
  - †Strophomena crassa
  - †Strophomena elongata
  - †Strophomena erratica
  - †Strophomena extenuata
  - †Strophomena heteromys
  - †Strophomena huronensis
  - †Strophomena inaequiradiata
  - †Strophomena levidensa
  - †Strophomena neglecta
  - †Strophomena nutans – or unidentified comparable form
  - †Strophomena parvula
  - †Strophomena pentagonia
  - †Strophomena planumbona
  - †Strophomena potterensis
  - †Strophomena sulcata
  - †Strophomena tenuicosta
  - †Strophomena titan
- †Styliolina
  - †Styliolina fissurella
- †Sulcoretepora
  - †Sulcoretepora deissi
  - †Sulcoretepora incisurata
  - †Sulcoretepora B – informal
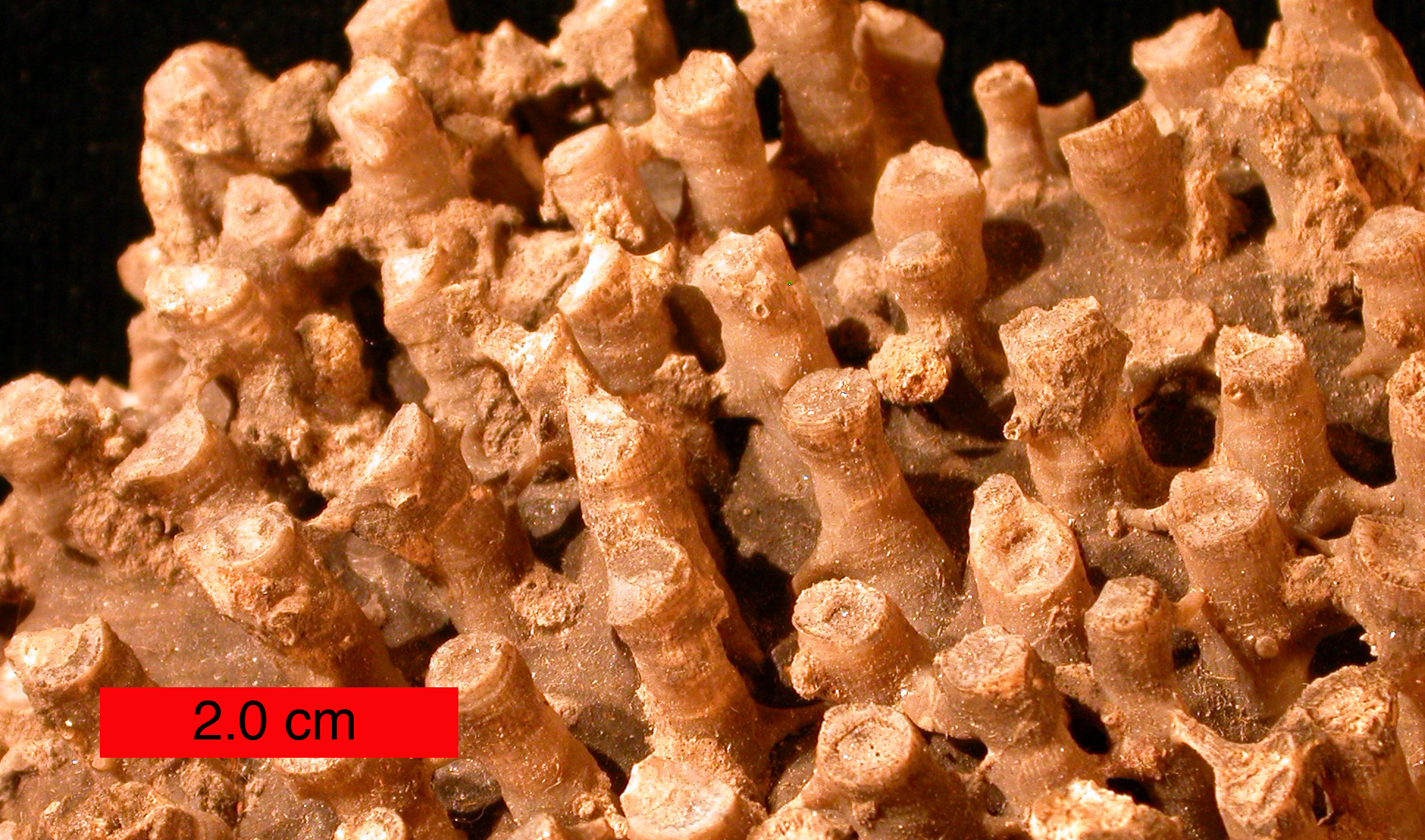
- Fossil of the Devonian tabulate coral Syringopora
  †Syringopora

== T ==
- †Technophorus
  - †Technophorus quincuncialis
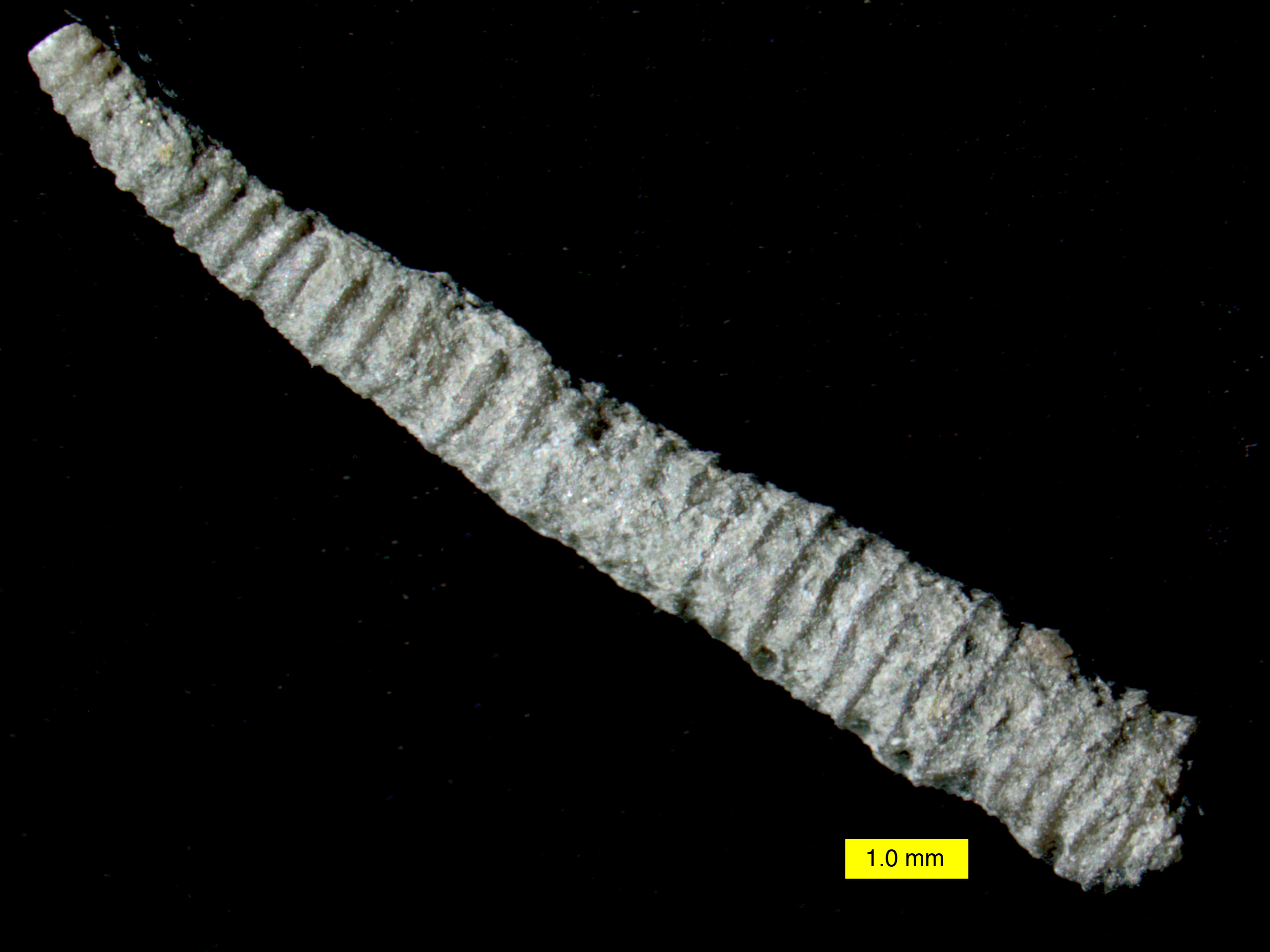
- Fossilized shell of the Early Ordovician-Late Devonian probable mollusc Tentaculites
  †Tentaculites
  - †Tentaculites bellulus
- †Tetradella
  - †Tetradella regularis
  - †Tetradella subquadratus
- †Tetradium
  - †Tetradium huronense
- †Thamnopora
  - †Thamnopora alpenensis
  - †Thamnopora magniventra – type locality for species
- †Thamnoptychia
  - †Thamnoptychia labyrinthica
  - †Thamnoptychia minuitissima
  - †Thamnoptychia silicensis
- †Trematis
  - †Trematis rugosa
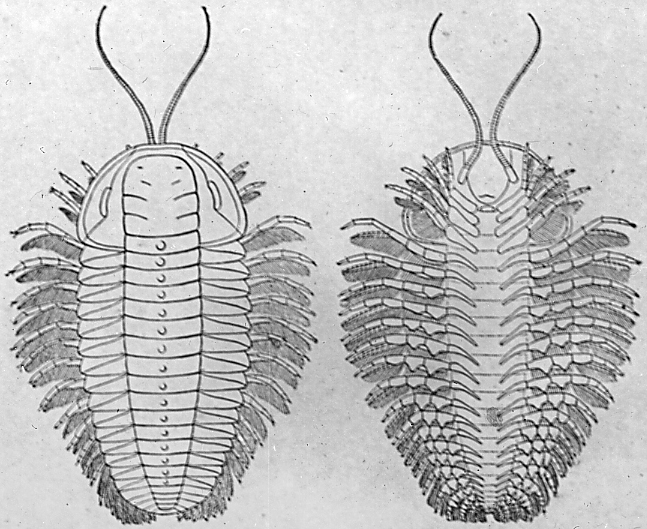
- Restoration showing the top (left) and underside of the Late Ordovician trilobite Triarthrus
  †Triarthrus
  - †Triarthrus eatoni
- †Trigonacarpolithus
  - †Trigonacarpolithus typicus
- †Trigonocarpus – report made of unidentified related form or using admittedly obsolete nomenclature
  - †Trigonocarpus Noeggerathi
- †Trigonocarus
- †Trimerella
- †Trochonema
  - †Trochonema wartheni
- †Tropidodiscus
  - †Tropidodiscus compticarinatus – type locality for species
- †Tropidoleptus
  - †Tropidoleptus carinatus
- †Truncalosia
  - †Truncalosia gibbosa
- †Turbinilopsis
  - †Turbinilopsis anacarina – type locality for species
- †Turbonitella
  - †Turbonitella trunculinoda
- †Tylothyris
  - †Tylothyris subvaricosa

== V ==
- †Vanuxemia
  - †Vanuxemia noquerrwnaia
  - †Vanuxemia strattoni
- †Vladanella
  - †Vladanella lirata – type locality for species

== W ==
- †Warrenella
  - †Warrenella laevis – or unidentified comparable form
- †Whitfieldella
- †Wisconsinella
  - †Wisconsinella clelandi – type locality for species

== Z ==
- †Zeilleria
  - †Zeilleria stellata
- †Zygospira
  - †Zygospira modesta – or unidentified comparable form
