= Columnaria =

Columnaria Temporal range: Late Ordovician – Late Devonian

Scientific classification
- Domain: Eukaryota
- Kingdom: Animalia
- Phylum: Cnidaria
- Subphylum: Anthozoa
- Class: †Rugosa
- Family: †Columnariidae
- Genus: †Columnaria; Goldfuss, 1826

Extinct genus of corals

Columnaria is an extinct genus of rugose coral that lived from the Late Ordovician to the Late Devonian. Its remains have been found in Australia, Europe, and North America.

== Sources ==
- Columnaria at the Field Museum's Evolving Planet
