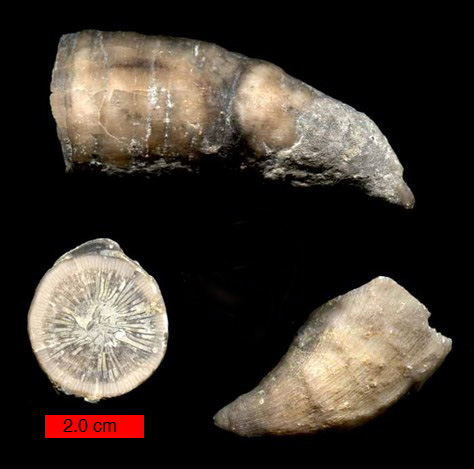

Scientific classification
- Kingdom: Animalia
- Phylum: Cnidaria
- Subphylum: Anthozoa
- Class: †Rugosa
- Family: †Streptelasmatidae
- Genus: †Grewingkia; Dybowski, 1873
- Species: †G. canadensis

Binomial name
- †Grewingkia canadensis (Billings, 1862)

Synonyms
- List: Grewingkia rustica; Streptelasma rusticum; Streptelasma vagans Foerste, 1909; Streptelasma insolitum Foerste, 1909; Streptelasma dispandum Foerste, 1909

= Grewingkia =

Grewingkia Temporal range: Ordovician

Extinct genus of corals

Grewingkia is a genus of extinct Paleozoic Rugose corals, found in Indiana. It contains at least one species, Grewingkia canadensis, which lived during the Ordovician Period.
