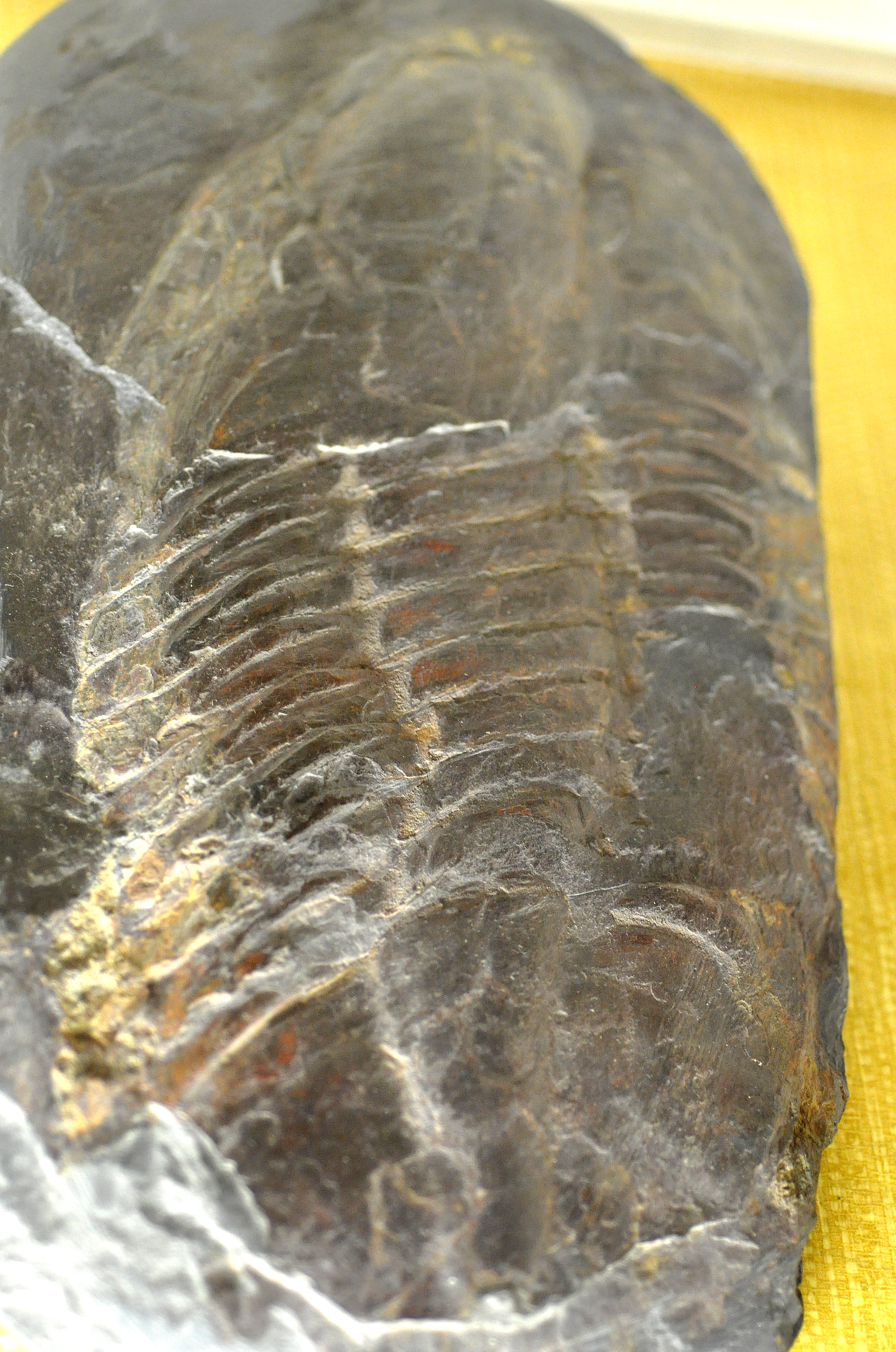
- Ogygites desmaresti from Sion, France

Scientific classification
- Kingdom: Animalia
- Phylum: Arthropoda
- Clade: †Artiopoda
- Class: †Trilobita
- Order: †Asaphida
- Family: †Asaphidae
- Genus: †Ogygites; Tromelin & Lebescote, 1876

= Ogygites =

Ogygites Temporal range: Ordovician

Extinct genus of trilobites

Ogygites is a genus of Ordovician trilobites in the family Asaphidae, with the type species Ogygites desmaresti. Species of Ogygites include the following:

- Ogygites canadensis
- Ogygites corndensis from Wales
- Ogygites desmaresti from southern France
- Ogygites guettardi from southern France
- Ogygites nobilis
