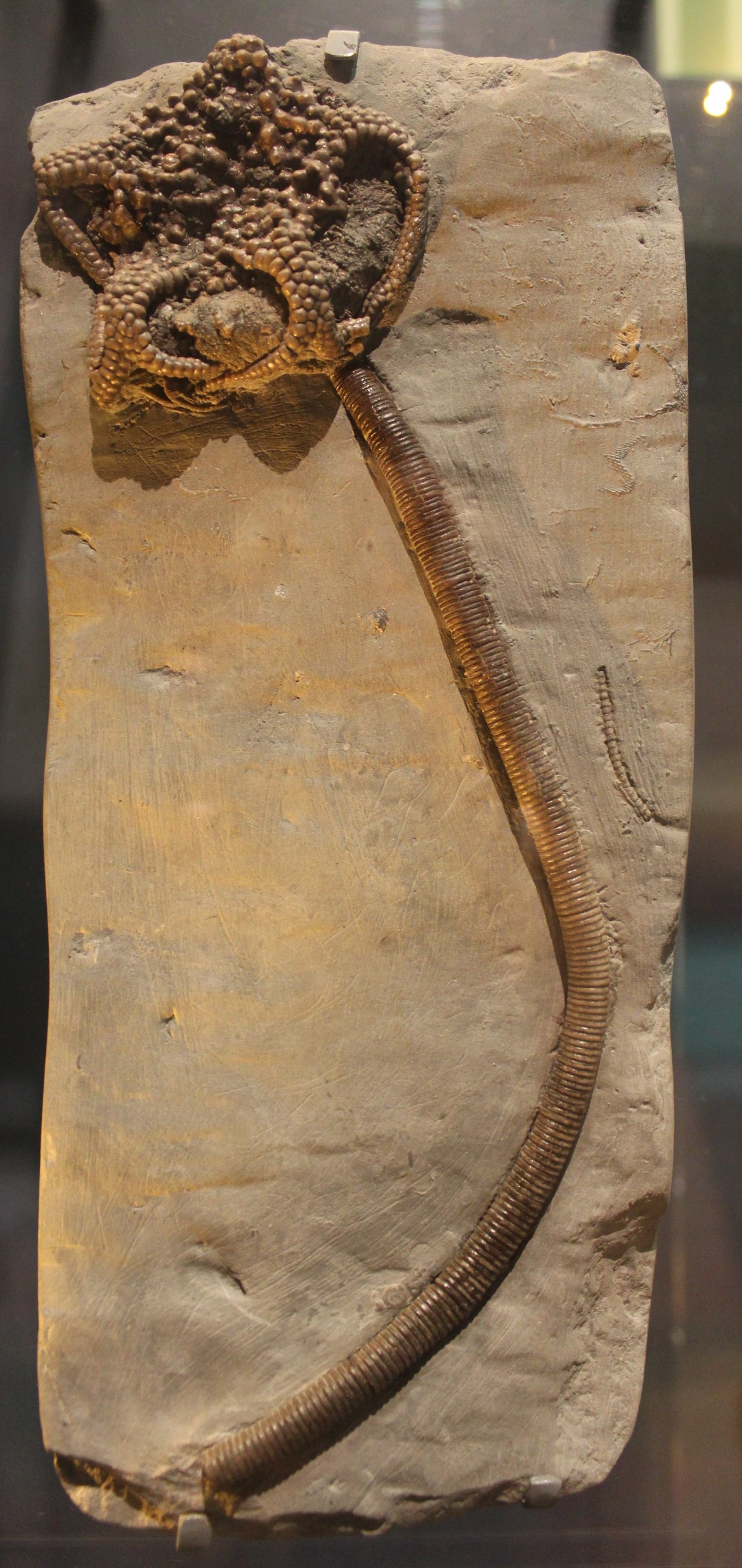
- G. tuberosus specimen, National Museum of Natural History

Scientific classification
- Kingdom: Animalia
- Phylum: Echinodermata
- Class: Crinoidea
- Order: †Diplobathrida
- Family: †Rhodocrinitidae
- Genus: †Gilbertsocrinus; Phillips, 1836

= Gilbertsocrinus =

Gilbertsocrinus Temporal range: Devonian–Carboniferous

Extinct genus of crinoids

Gilbertsocrinus are an extinct genus of Paleozoic stalked crinoids.

These stationary upper-level epifaunal suspension feeders lived in the Devonian of the Czech Republic and United States, as well as in the Carboniferous of the United Kingdom and United States, from 416.0 to 345.0 Ma.

== Species ==
- Gilbertsocrinus alpenensis Ehlers 1925
- Gilbertsocrinus intersculptus Goldring 1936
- Gilbertsocrinus rarispinus Goldring 1936
- Gilbertsocrinus tuberosus (Lyon & Casseday)

== Description ==
Gilbertsocrinus are quite common crinoids with some unusual features. They have a flexible column, an unusual holdfast, tegmen appendages and minute arms.
