= List of the prehistoric life of Michigan =

This list of the prehistoric life of Michigan contains the various prehistoric life-forms whose fossilized remains have been reported from within the US state of Michigan.

== Precambrian ==
The Paleobiology Database records no known occurrences of Precambrian fossils in Michigan.

== Paleozoic ==
=== Selected Paleozoic taxa of Michigan ===
- †Acidaspis
- †Actinoceras
- †Alethopteris
  - †Alethopteris decurrens
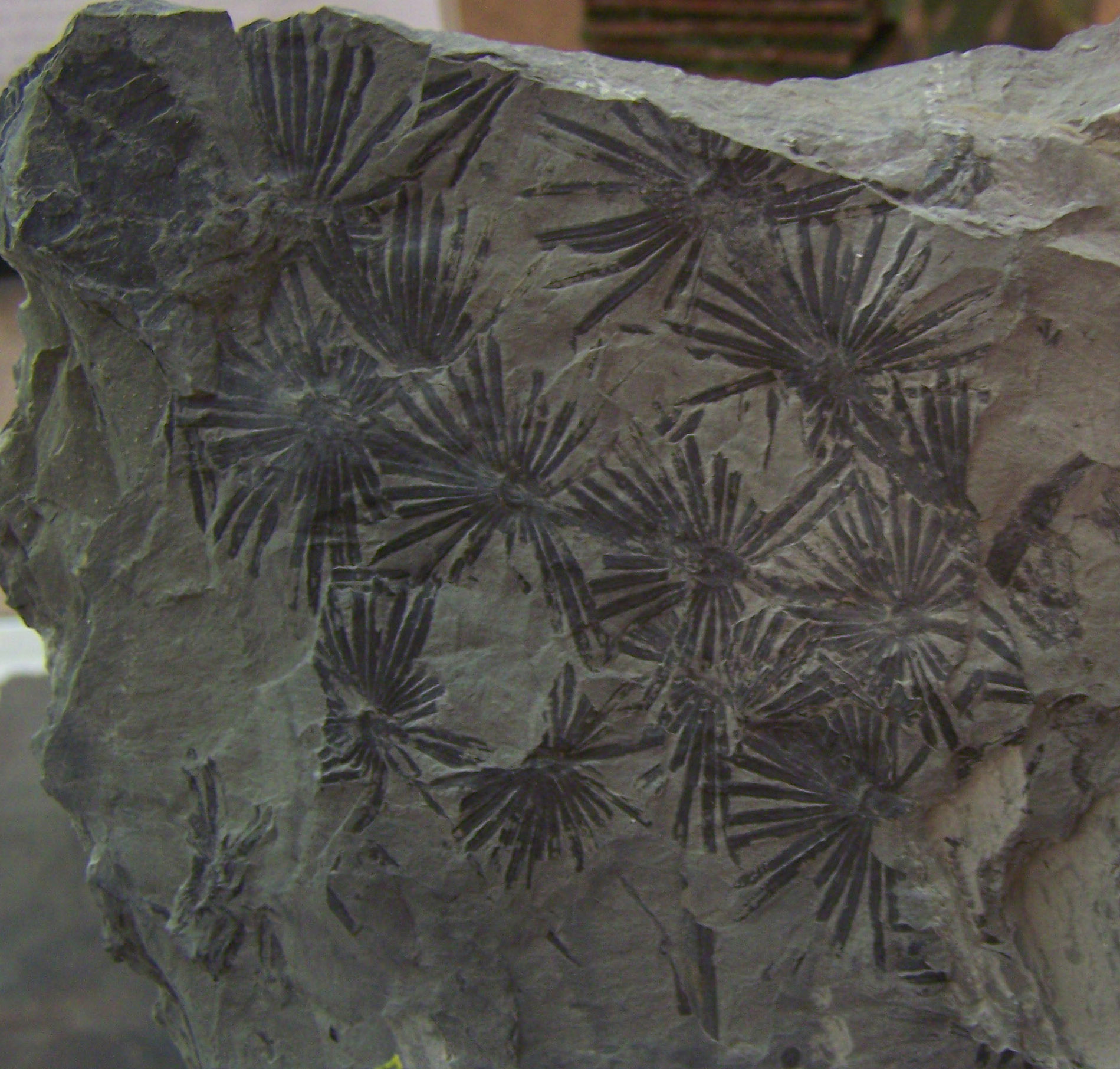
- Fossil of the Carboniferous horsetail relative Annularia
  †Annularia
  - †Annularia asteris
  - †Annularia sphenophylloides
- †Athyris
- †Atrypa
  - †Atrypa traversensis
- †Aulopora
  - †Aulopora microbuccinata
- †Bellerophon
- †Calamites
  - †Calamites carinatus
  - †Calamites cistii
  - †Calamites ramosus
  - †Calamites schutzeiformis
  - †Calamites suckowii
  - †Calamites undulatus
- †Callixylon
- †Calymene
- †Camarotoechia
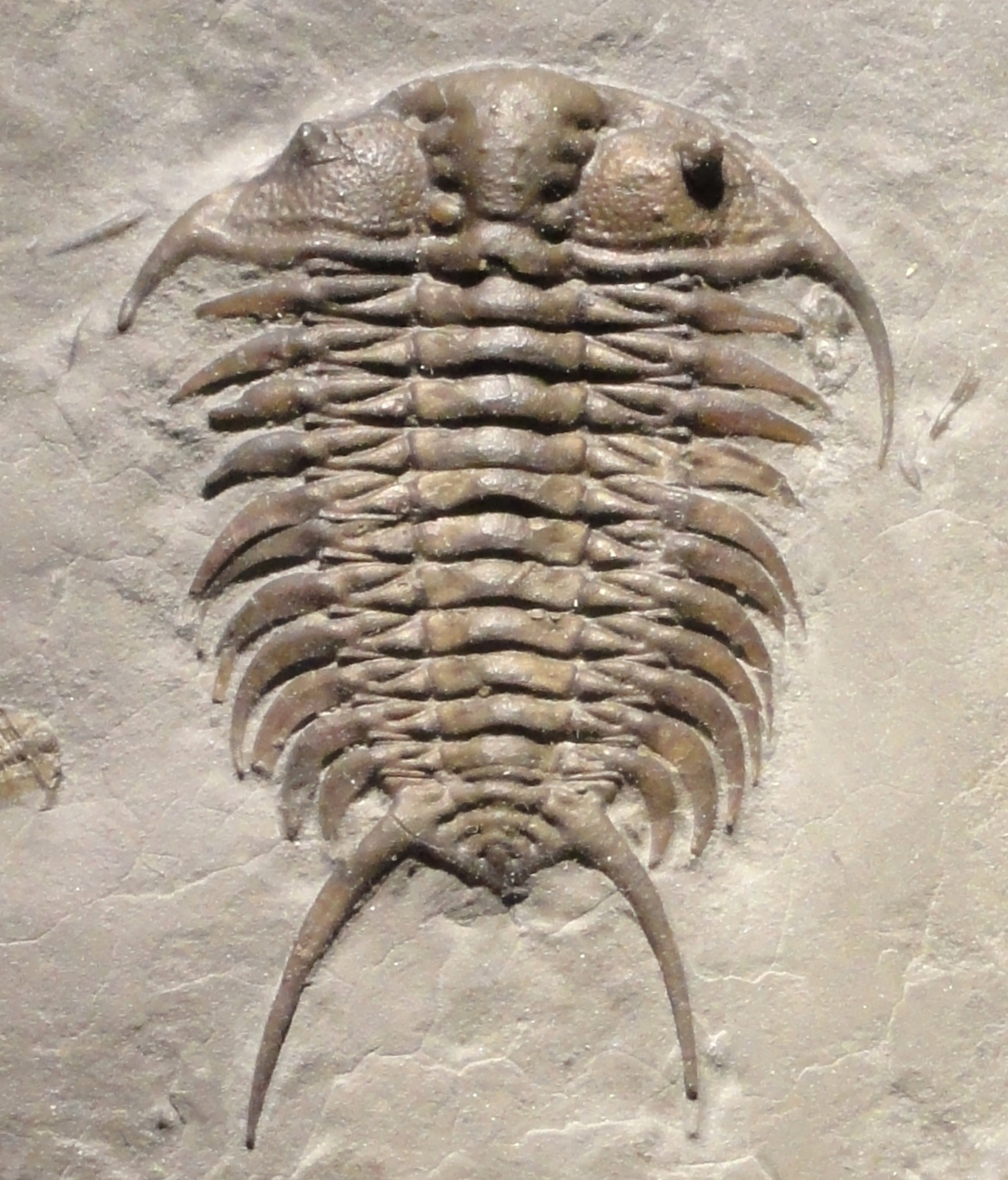
- Fossil of the Middle-Late Ordovician trilobite Ceraurus
  †Ceraurus
- †Chonetes
  - †Chonetes ensicosta
  - †Chonetes hybus
  - †Chonetes pachyactis
- †Climacograptus
- †Columnaria
  - †Columnaria alveolata
  - †Columnaria calicina
  - †Columnaria stokesi
- †Cordaites
  - †Cordaites borassifolius
  - †Cordaites crassinervis
  - †Cordaites michiganensis
  - †Cordaites palmaeformis
  - †Cordaites principalis
- †Cornulites
  - †Cornulites corrugatus
  - †Cornulites flexuosus
  - †Cornulites sterlingensis – or unidentified comparable form
- †Cyclonema
- †Cyrtolites
- †Eldredgeops
  - †Eldredgeops rana
- †Encrinurus
- †Endoceras
- †Erieopterus
- †Favosites
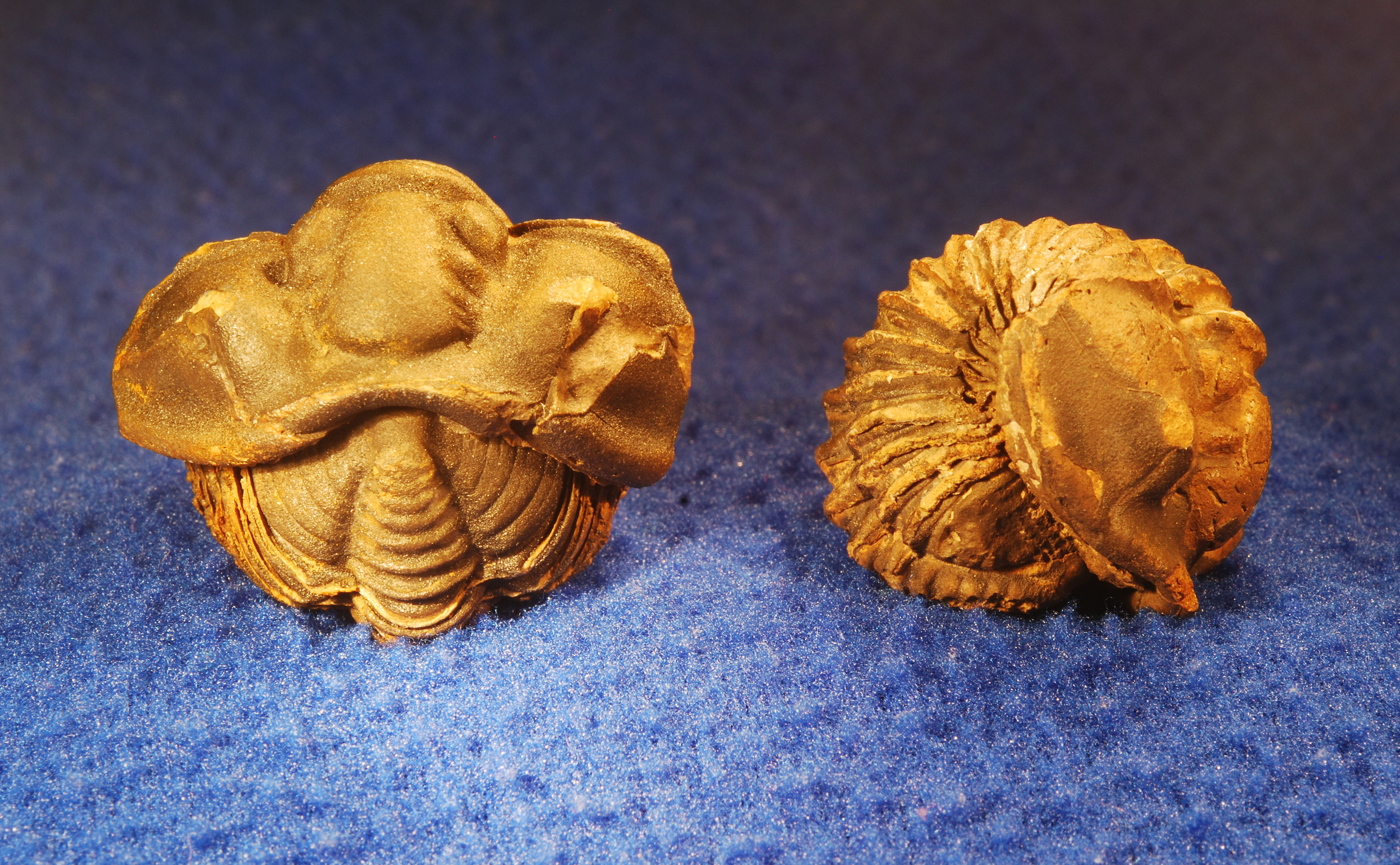
- Flexicalymene enrolled
  †Flexicalymene
  - †Flexicalymene croneisi
  - †Flexicalymene magnipapilla – type locality for species
  - †Flexicalymene meeki – or unidentified comparable form
  - †Flexicalymene planilabra – type locality for species
  - †Flexicalymene praelongicephala – type locality for species
  - †Flexicalymene quadricapita – type locality for species
  - †Flexicalymene senaria
- †Gilbertsocrinus
- †Girvanella
- †Grewingkia
  - †Grewingkia canadensis
- †Hallopora
  - †Hallopora subnodosa
- †Halysites
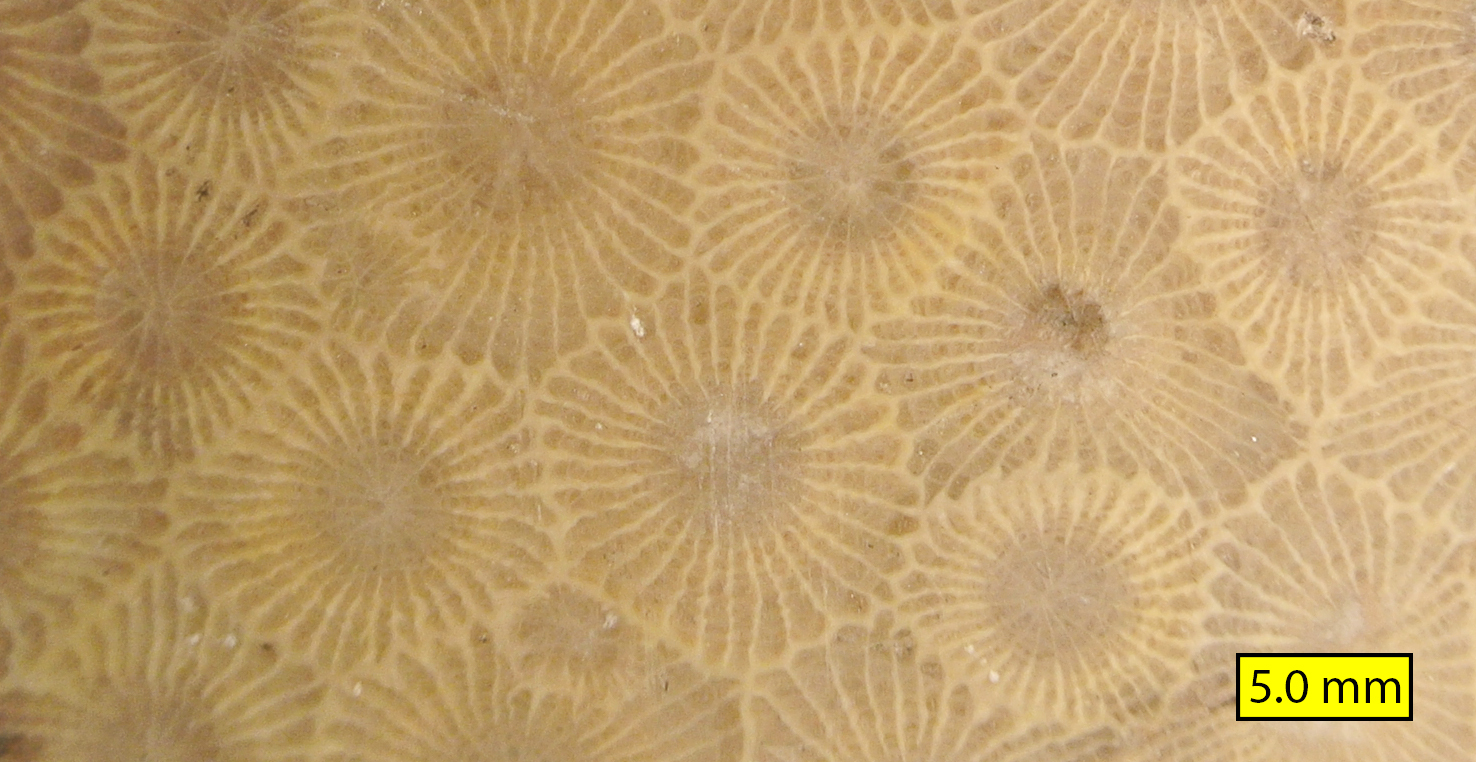
- Fossil of the Devonian colonial rugose coral Hexagonaria, also known as a Petoskey stone
  †Hexagonaria
  - †Hexagonaria pericarinata
- †Hindia
- †Holopea
- †Icriodus
- †Isotelus
  - †Isotelus gigas
- †Lepidodendron
  - †Lepidodendron aculeatum
  - †Lepidodendron Brittsii
  - †Lepidodendron dichotomum
  - †Lepidodendron lanceolatum
  - †Lepidodendron lycopodiodes
  - †Lepidodendron obovatum
  - †Lepidodendron obvatum
  - †Lepidodendron ophiurioides
  - †Lepidodendron vestitum
- †Lepidostrobus
- †Lingula
- †Maelonoceras
- †Meristella
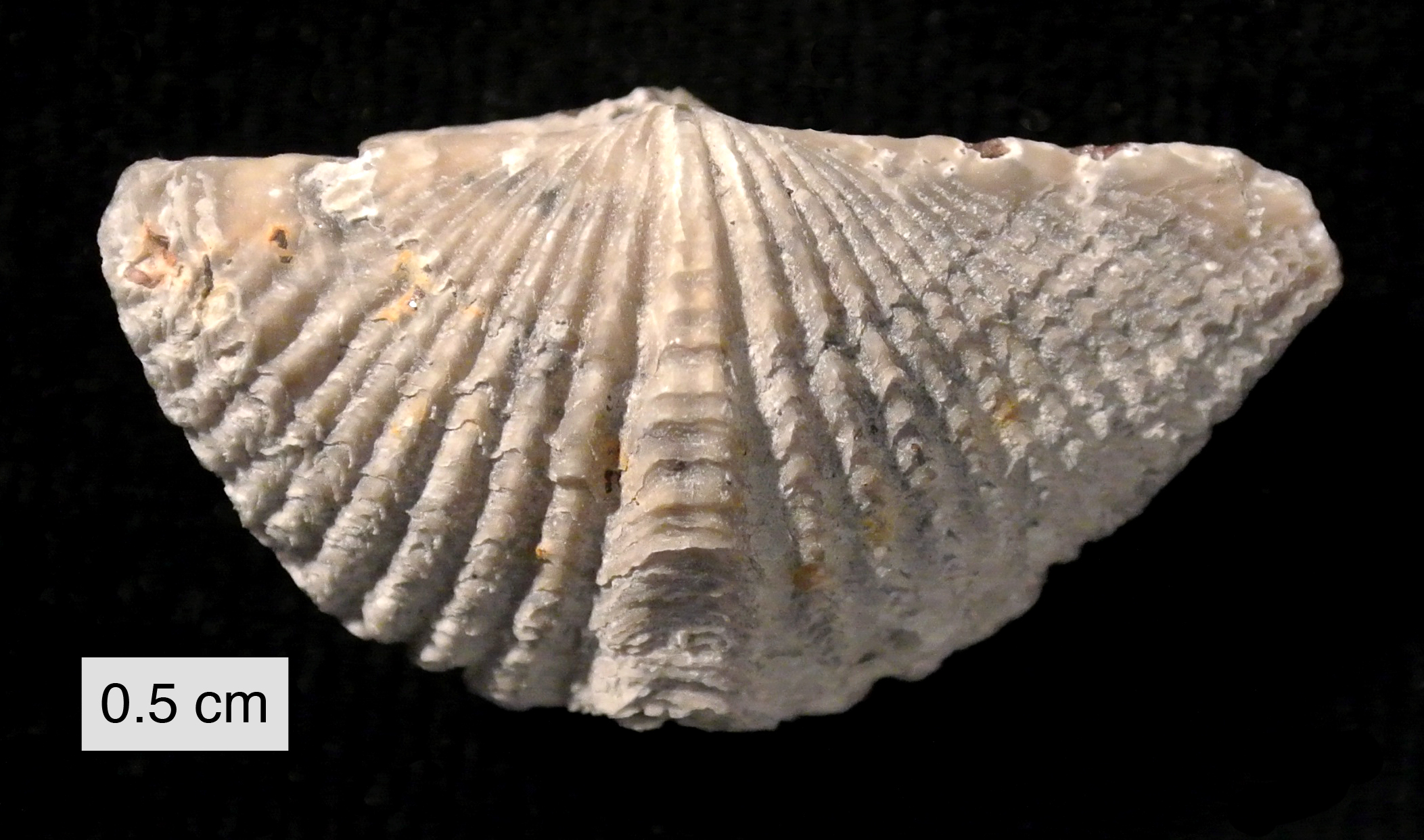
- Fossilized shell of the Devonian brachiopod Mucrospirifer
  †Mucrospirifer
  - †Mucrospirifer attenuatus
  - †Mucrospirifer grabaui
  - †Mucrospirifer latus
  - †Mucrospirifer mucronatus
  - †Mucrospirifer profundus
  - †Mucrospirifer prolificus
  - †Mucrospirifer thedfordensis
- †Murchisonia
- †Naticopsis
  - †Naticopsis manitobensis
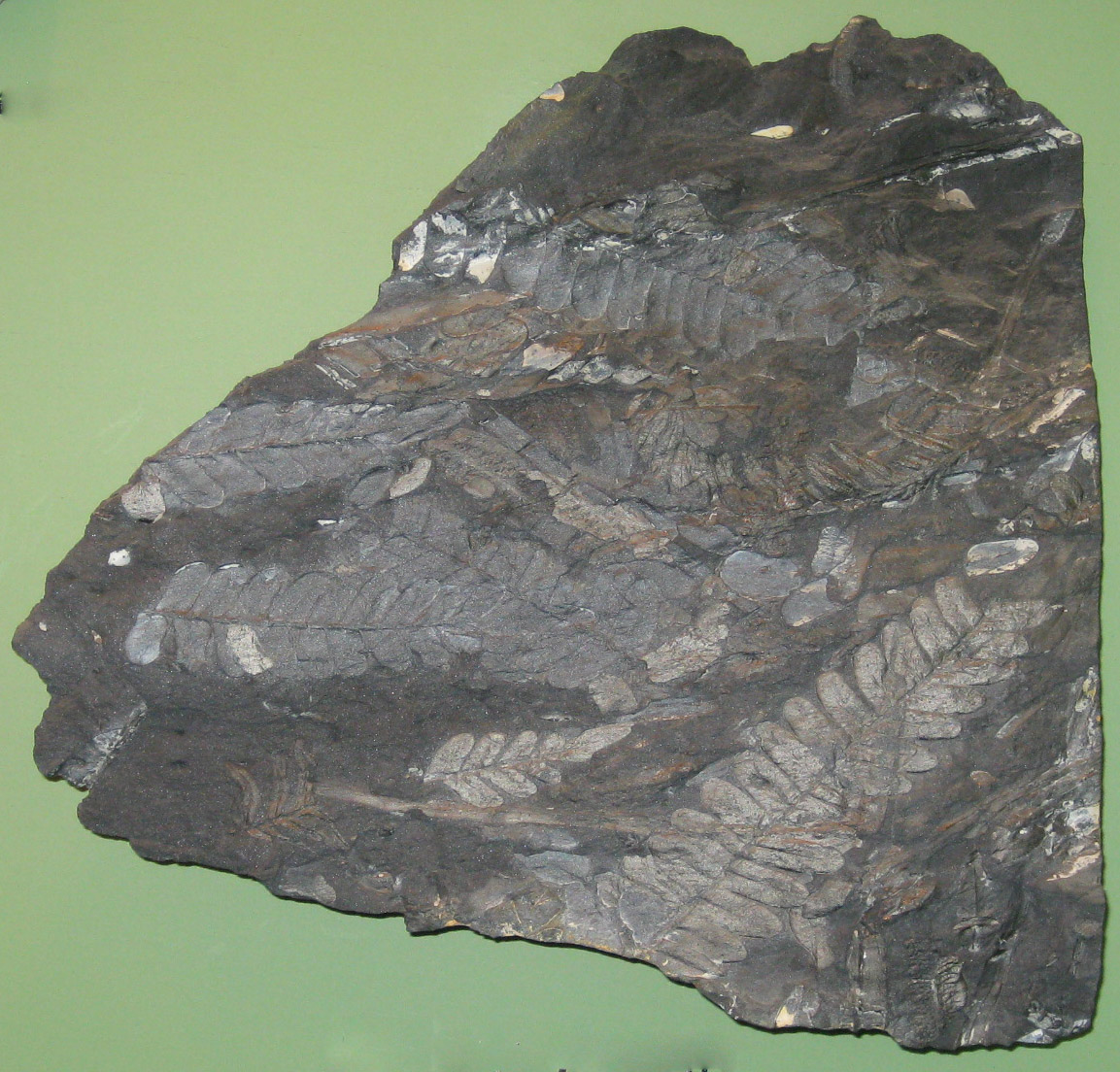
- Fronds of the Carboniferous seed fern Neuropteris
  †Neuropteris
  - †Neuropteris caudata
  - †Neuropteris dilitata
  - †Neuropteris flexuosa
  - †Neuropteris gigntea – tentative report
  - †Neuropteris harrisi – or unidentified comparable form
  - †Neuropteris heterophylla – or unidentified comparable form
  - †Neuropteris obliqua
  - †Neuropteris rarinervis
  - †Neuropteris saginawensis
  - †Neuropteris scheuchzeri
  - †Neuropteris Schlehani
  - †Neuropteris tenuifolia
- †Nodonema
- †Nowakia
- †Nuculoidea
- †Ogygites
- †Oncoceras
- †Orthoceras
- †Panenka
- †Paraspirifer
- †Pecopteris
- †Pentamerus
- †Phragmolites
- †Plaesiomys
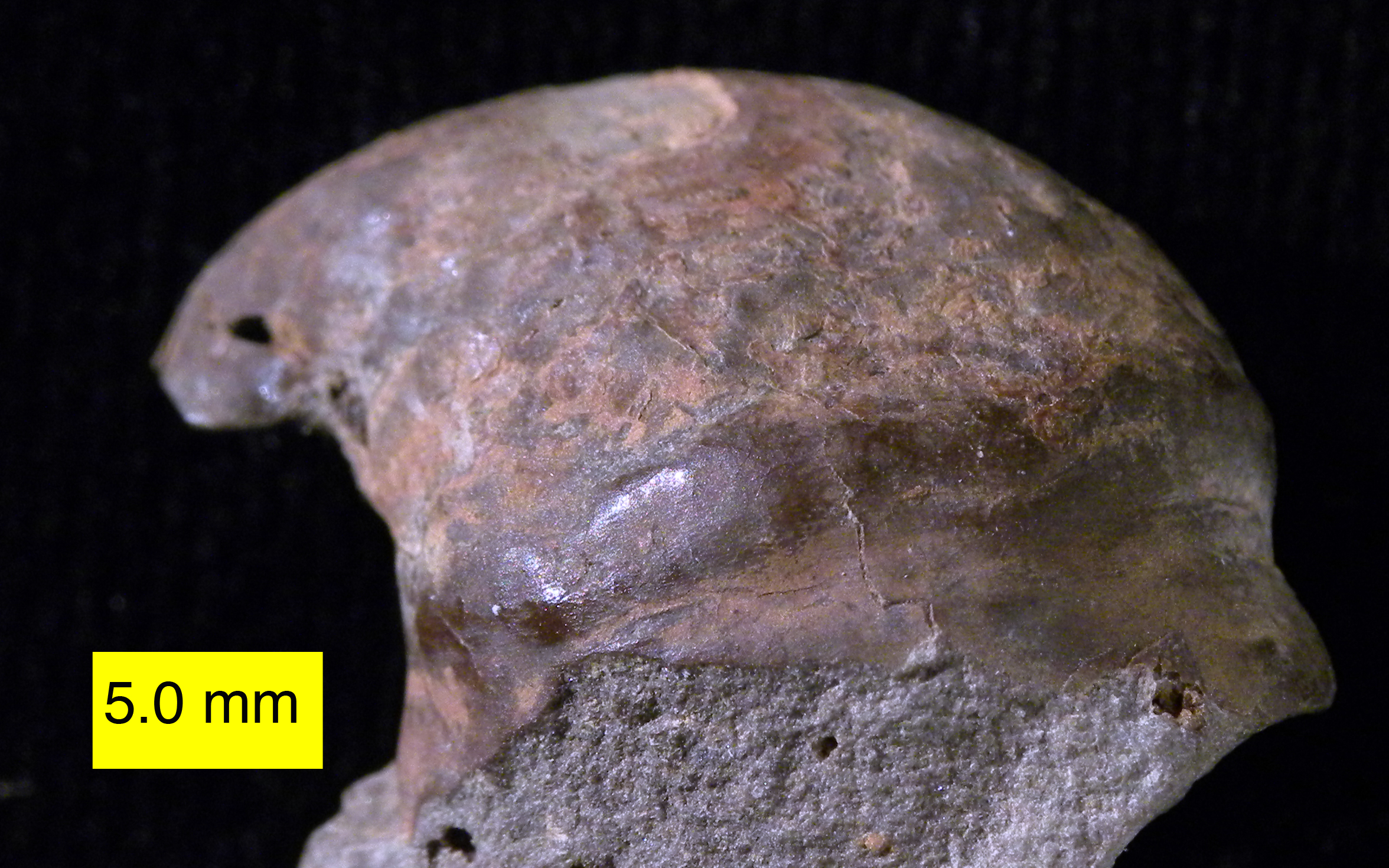
- Fossilized shell of the Silurian-Early Triassic sea snail Platyceras
  †Platyceras
  - †Platyceras bucculentum
  - †Platyceras carinatum
  - †Platyceras rarispinum
- †Platystrophia
  - †Platystrophia acutilirata
  - †Platystrophia annieana
  - †Platystrophia clarkesvillensis
  - †Platystrophia clarksvillensis
  - †Platystrophia cypha – or unidentified related form
  - †Platystrophia moritura
- †Pleurodictyum
- †Polygnathus
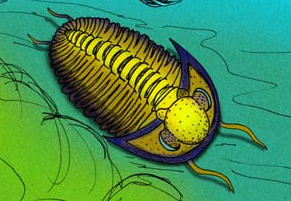
- Restoration of the Silurian trilobite Proetus
  †Proetus
  - †Proetus chambliensis
- †Samaropsis
- †Scenella – tentative report
- †Scutellum
- †Sigillaria
- †Sphenophyllum
  - †Sphenophyllum bifurcatum
  - †Sphenophyllum cuneifolium
  - †Sphenophyllum emarginatum
  - †Sphenophyllum majus
  - †Sphenophyllum saxifragaefolium
- †Sphenopteris
- †Spirifer – report made of unidentified related form or using admittedly obsolete nomenclature
- †Spyroceras
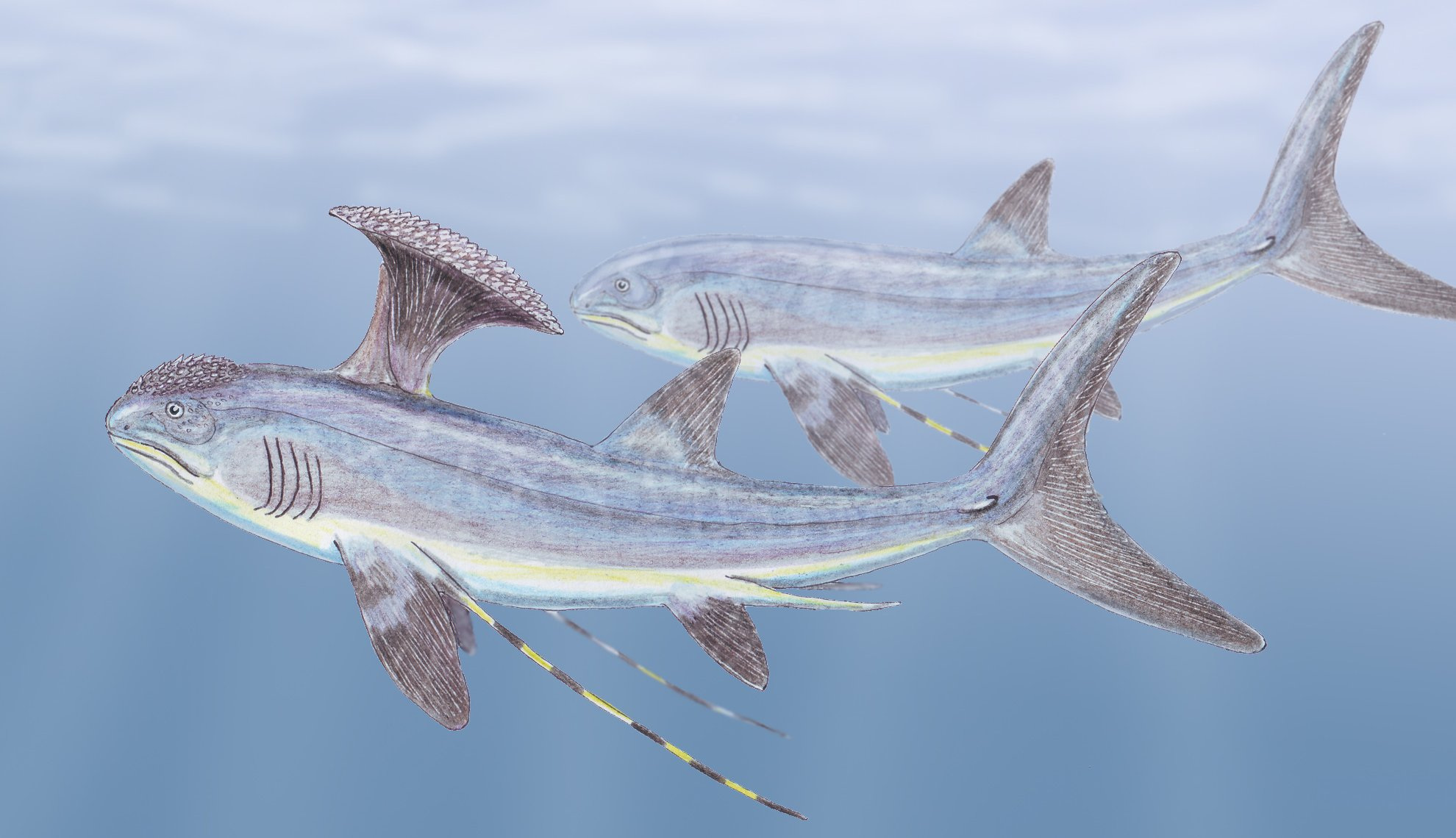
- Life restorations of a male (foreground) and female (background) of the Late Devonian-Carboniferous Chimaera relative Stethacanthus
  †Stethacanthus
- †Stigmaria
- †Stigmatella
- †Strophomena
  - †Strophomena alpenensis
  - †Strophomena costata
  - †Strophomena crassa
  - †Strophomena elongata
  - †Strophomena erratica
  - †Strophomena extenuata
  - †Strophomena heteromys
  - †Strophomena huronensis
  - †Strophomena inaequiradiata
  - †Strophomena levidensa
  - †Strophomena neglecta
  - †Strophomena nutans – or unidentified comparable form
  - †Strophomena parvula
  - †Strophomena pentagonia
  - †Strophomena planumbona
  - †Strophomena potterensis
  - †Strophomena sulcata
  - †Strophomena tenuicosta
  - †Strophomena titan
- †Syringopora
- †Tentaculites
- †Tetradium
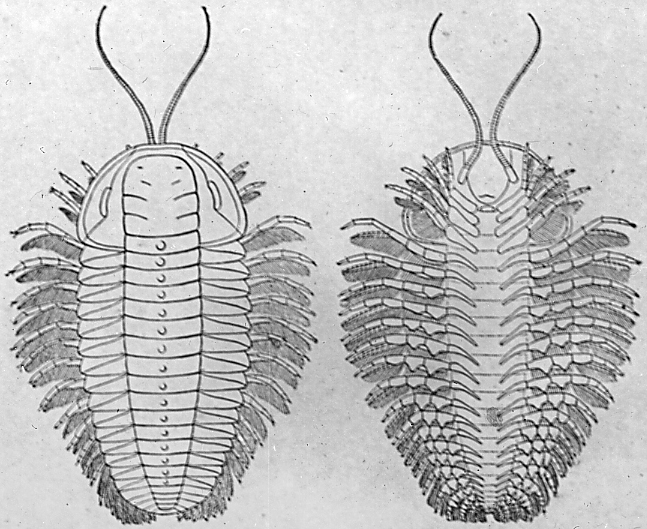
- Restoration showing the top (left) and underside of the Late Ordovician trilobite Triarthrus
  †Triarthrus
  - †Triarthrus eatoni

== Mesozoic ==
The Paleobiology Database records no known occurrences of Mesozoic fossils in Michigan.

== Cenozoic ==
- Abies
  - †Abies balsamea
- Acer
- †Achnanthes
  - †Achnanthes biasolettiana
  - †Achnanthes exigua
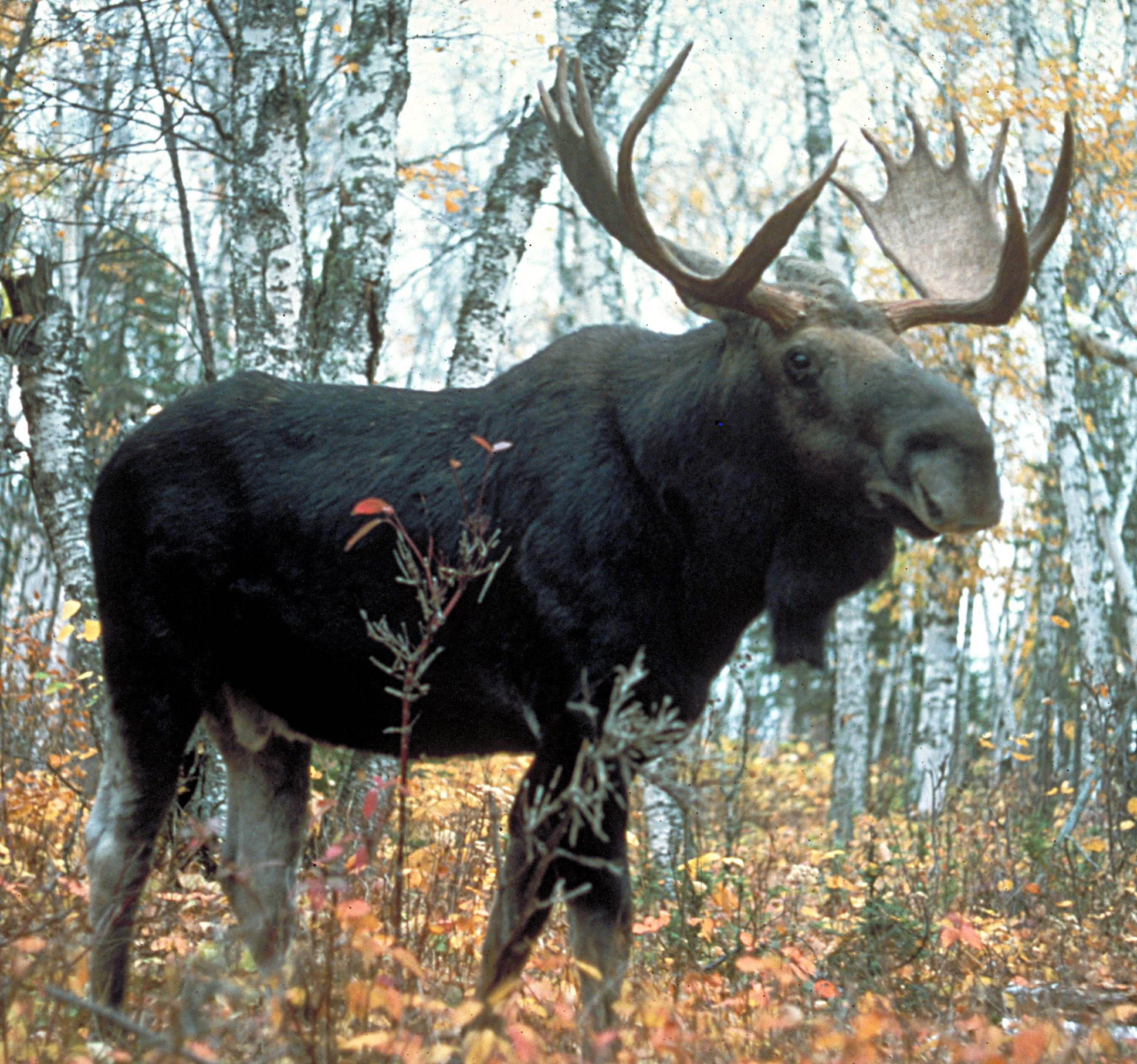
- A living Alces, or moose
  Alces
  - †Alces alces
- Alnus
- †Ambrosia
- Amnicola
  - †Amnicola integra
  - †Amnicola limosa
- †Amphora
  - †Amphora perpusilla
- Anodonta
  - †Anodonta grandis – or unidentified comparable form
- Aplodinotus
  - †Aplodinotus grunniens – or unidentified comparable form
- †Armiger
  - †Armiger crista
- †Artemesia
- †Artemisia
- Aythya
  - †Aythya affinis
- †Bakerilymnea
  - †Bakerilymnea dalli
- Betula
- Bufo
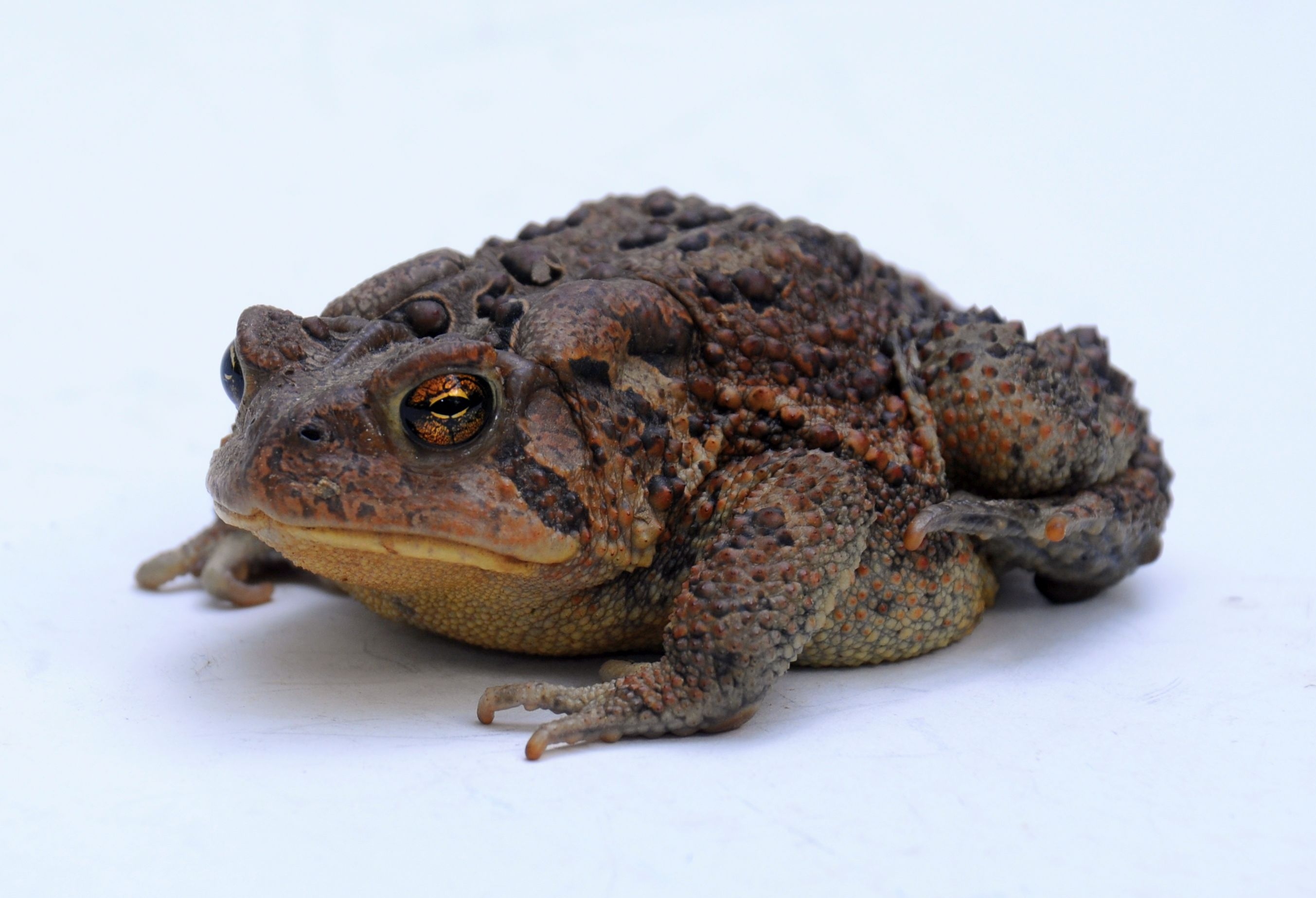
  - A living Anaxyrus americanus (formerly Bufo americanus), or American toad
    †Bufo americanus
- Candona
  - †Candona caudata
  - †Candona paraohioensis
  - †Candona rawsoni
- Canis
- Carya
- Carychium
  - †Carychium exiguum
- Castor
  - †Castor canadensis
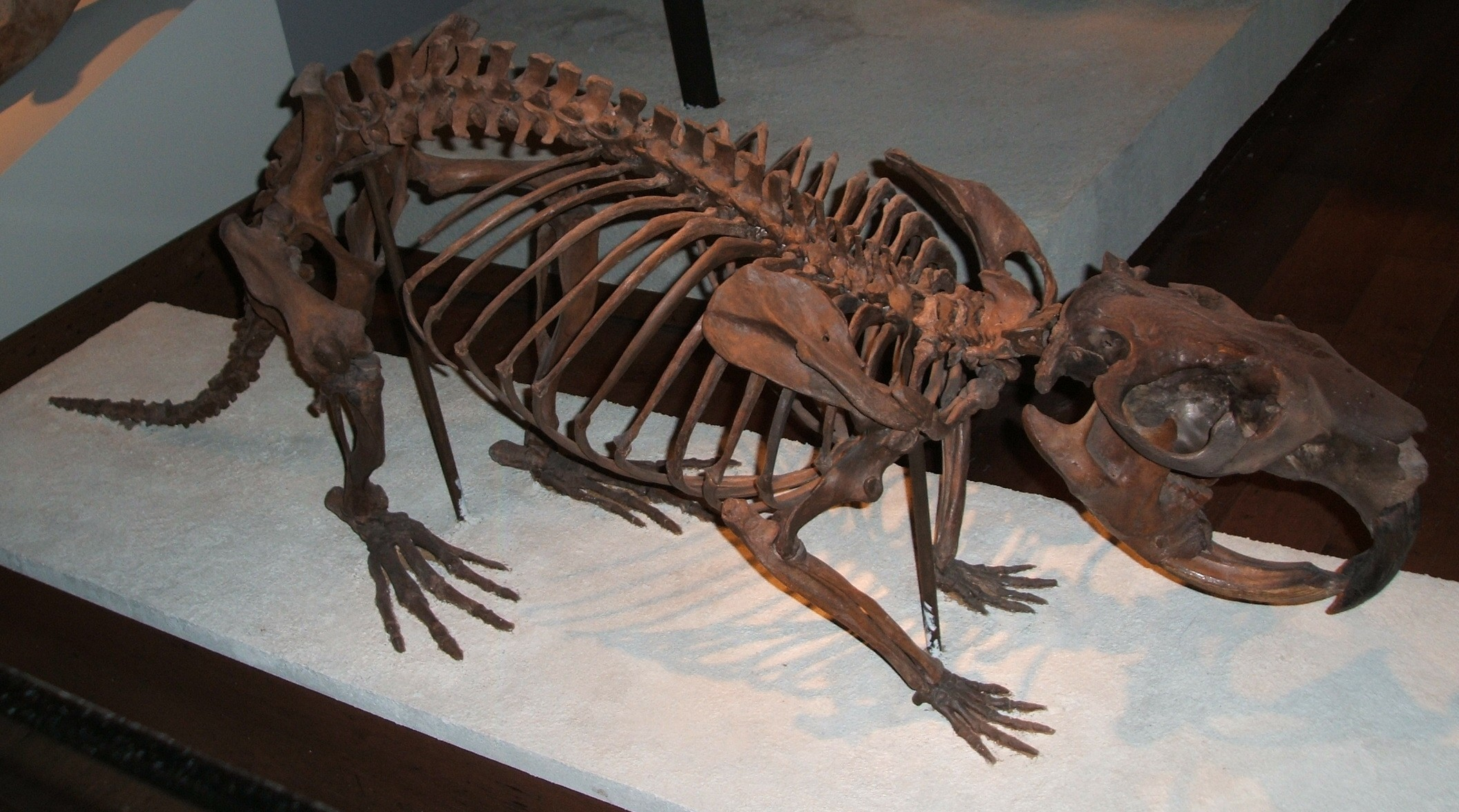
- Mounted fossilized skeleton of the Pliocene-Pleistocene giant beaver Castoroides
  †Castoroides
  - †Castoroides ohioensis
- †Catinella
- †Catostomus
  - †Catostomus commersoni
- †Cervalces
  - †Cervalces scotti
- †Cionella
  - †Cionella lubrica
- Clethrionomys
- †Columella
- †Cymbella
  - †Cymbella diluviana
- †Cytherissa
  - †Cytherissa lacustris
- Dicrostonyx
- Discus
  - †Discus cronkhitei
- Dryopteris
- Esox
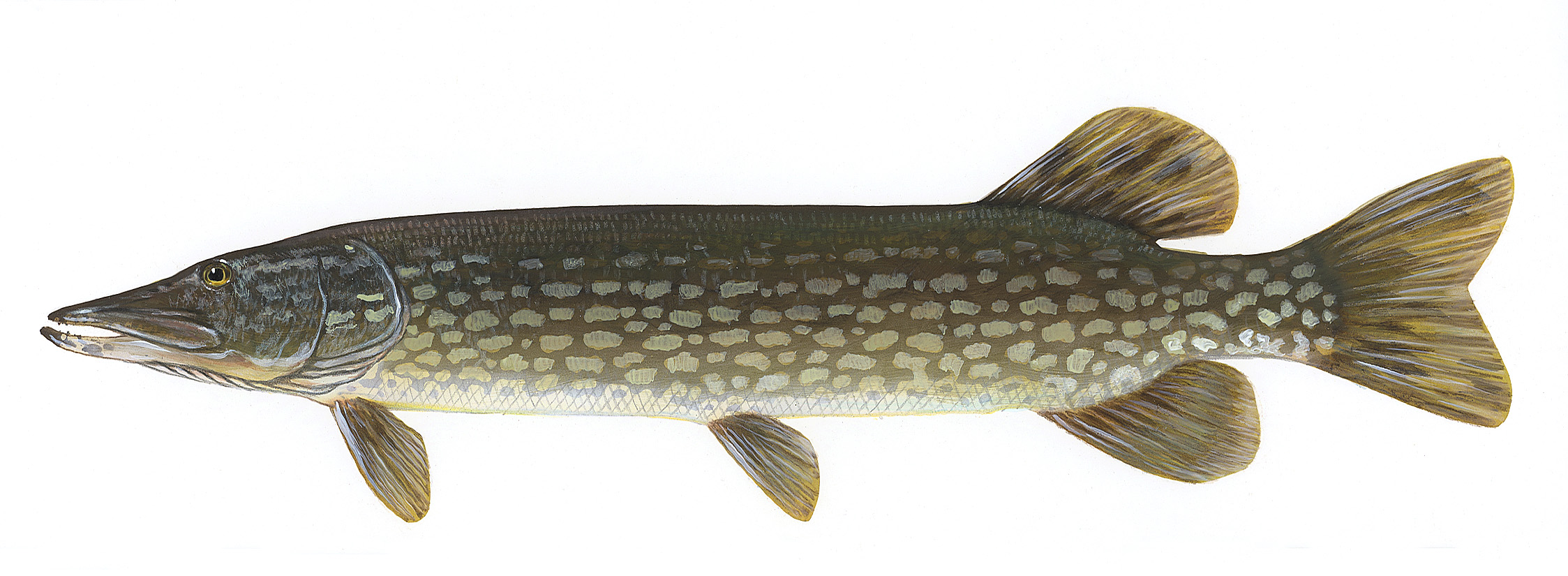
  - Illustration of a living Esox lucius, or northern pike
    †Esox lucius
- Ferrissia
  - †Ferrissia fragilis
  - †Ferrissia paralellelus
- Fossaria
  - †Fossaria decampi
- †Fragilaria
  - †Fragilaria brevistriata
  - †Fragilaria construens
  - †Fragilaria lapponica
- †Fragillaria
  - †Fragillaria pinnata
- †Fraxinus
- Grus
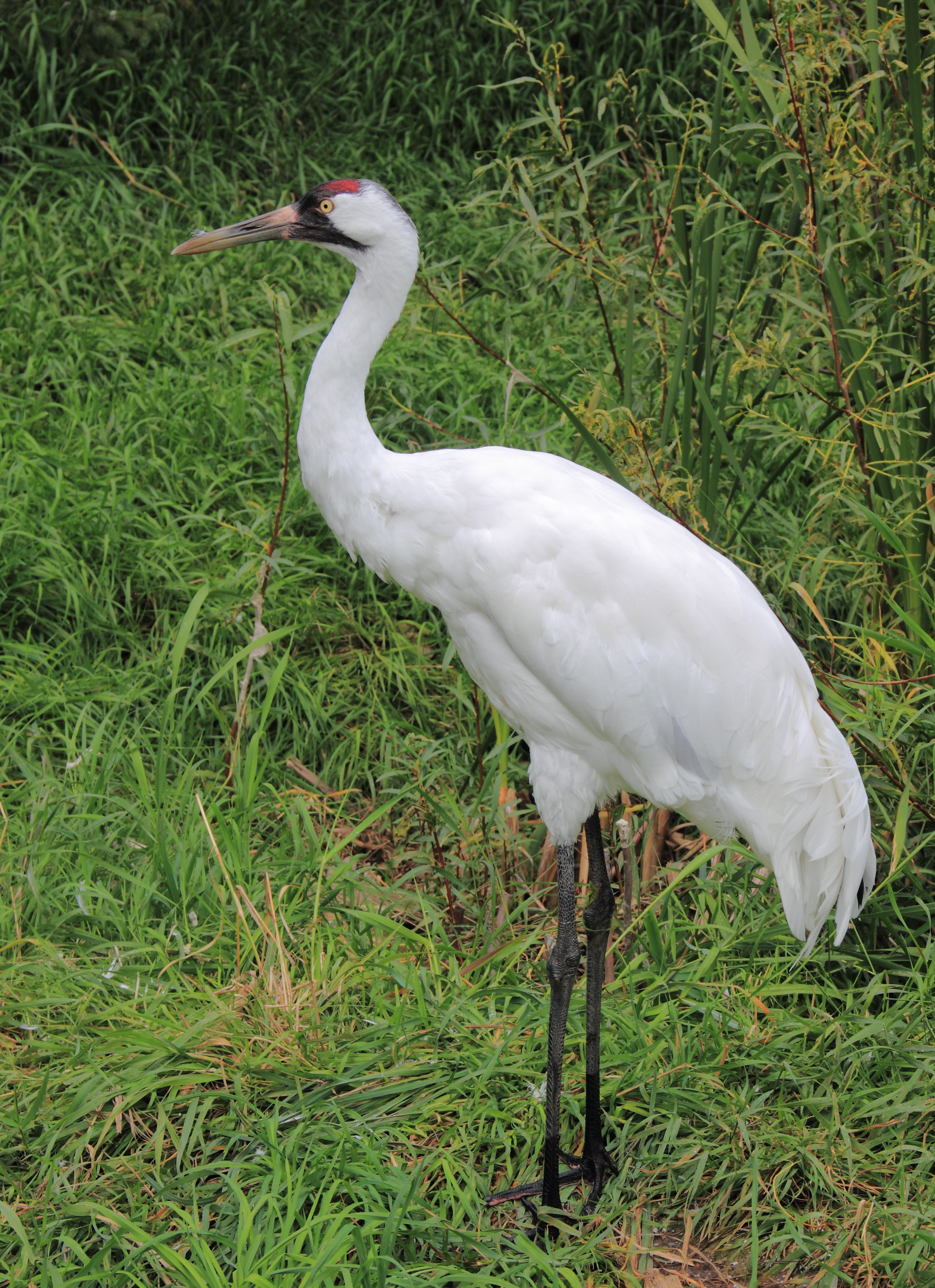
  - A living Grus americana, or whooping crane
    †Grus americana
- Gryaulus
  - †Gryaulus parvus
- Gyraulus
  - †Gyraulus deflectus
  - †Gyraulus parvus
- Helisoma
  - †Helisoma anceps
- Hendersonia
  - †Hendersonia occulta
- Juglans
- Larix
  - †Larix laricina
- Lemmus
  - †Lemmus trimucronatus – or unidentified comparable form
- Limnocythere
  - †Limnocythere varia
- Lioplax
  - †Lioplax suculosa – or unidentified comparable form
- Lycopodium
- Lymnaea
  - †Lymnaea stagnalis
- †Mammut
  - †Mammut americanum
- †Mammuthus
  - †Mammuthus columbi
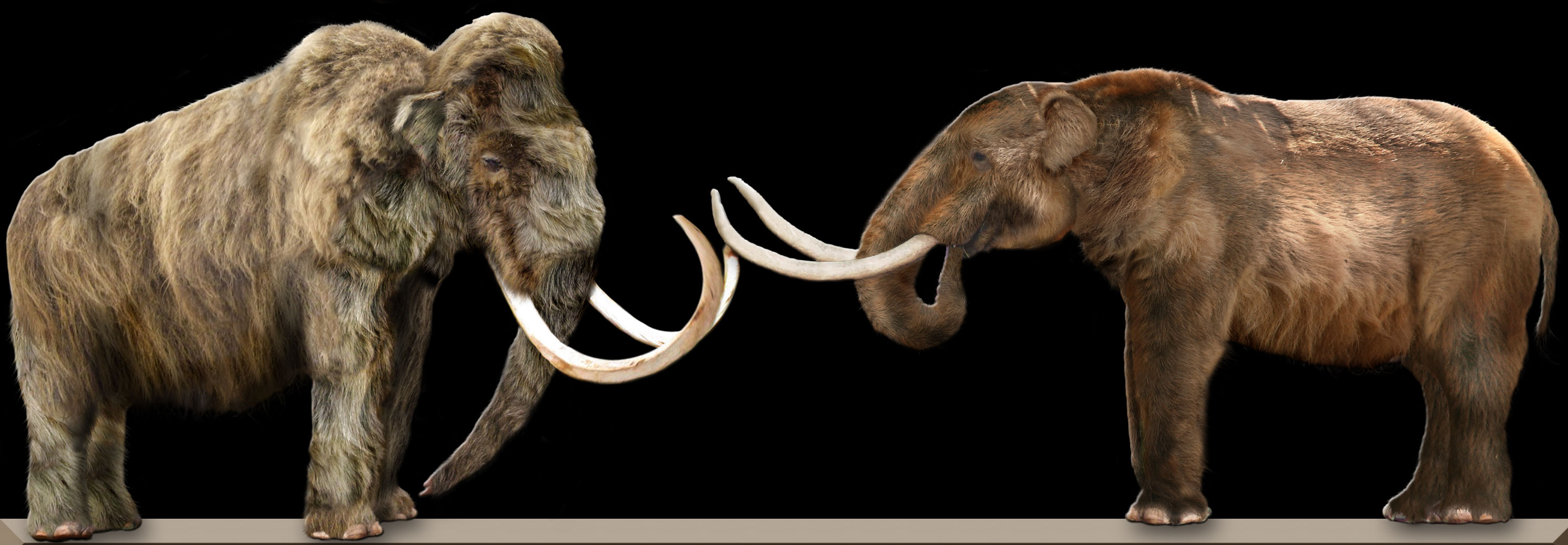
  - Life restorations of a Mammut americanum, or American mastodon (right), and a Mammuthus primigenius, or wooly mammoth (left)
    †Mammuthus primigenius
- Meleagris
  - †Meleagris gallopavo
- Microtus
  - †Microtus pennsylvanicus
  - †Microtus xanthognathus
- Mictomys
  - †Mictomys borealis
- Mustela
  - †Mustela richardsonii
- †Navicula
  - †Navicula graciloides
  - †Navicula minima
  - †Navicula modica
  - †Navicula subrotundata
- Odocoileus
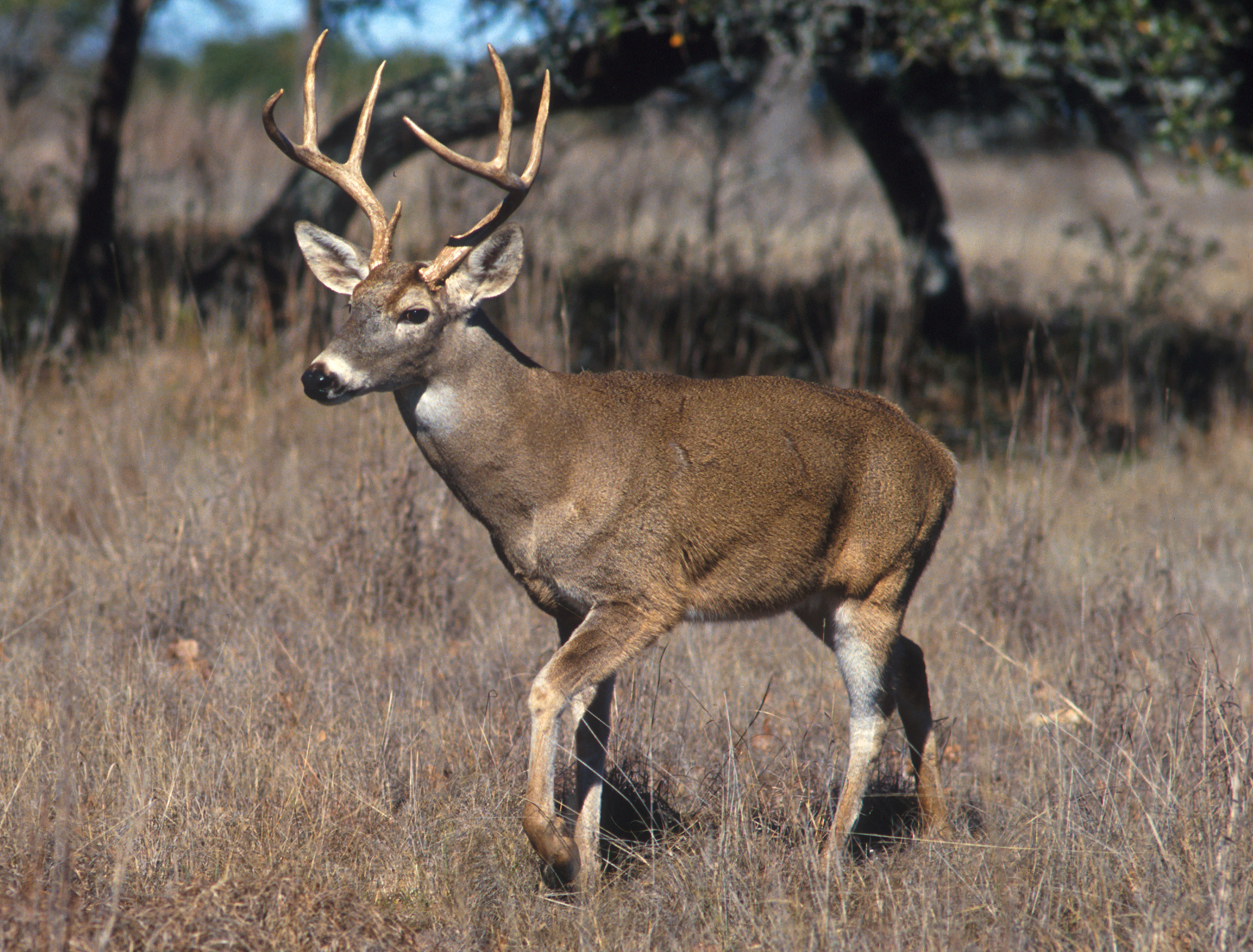
  - A living Odocoileus virginianus, or white-tailed deer
    †Odocoileus virginianus
- Ondatra
  - †Ondatra zibethicus
- Ostrya
- †Pediastrum
- Perca
  - †Perca flavescens
- Peromyscus
- Physella
  - †Physella integra
- Picea
  - †Picea glauca
  - †Picea mariana
- Pinus
  - †Pinus banksiana
  - †Pinus resinosa
  - †Pinus strobus
- Pisidium
  - †Pisidium compressum
  - †Pisidium dubium
  - †Pisidium idahoense
  - †Pisidium milium
  - †Pisidium nitidum
  - †Pisidium variabile
  - †Pisidium ventricosum
- †Planorbella
  - †Planorbella campanulata
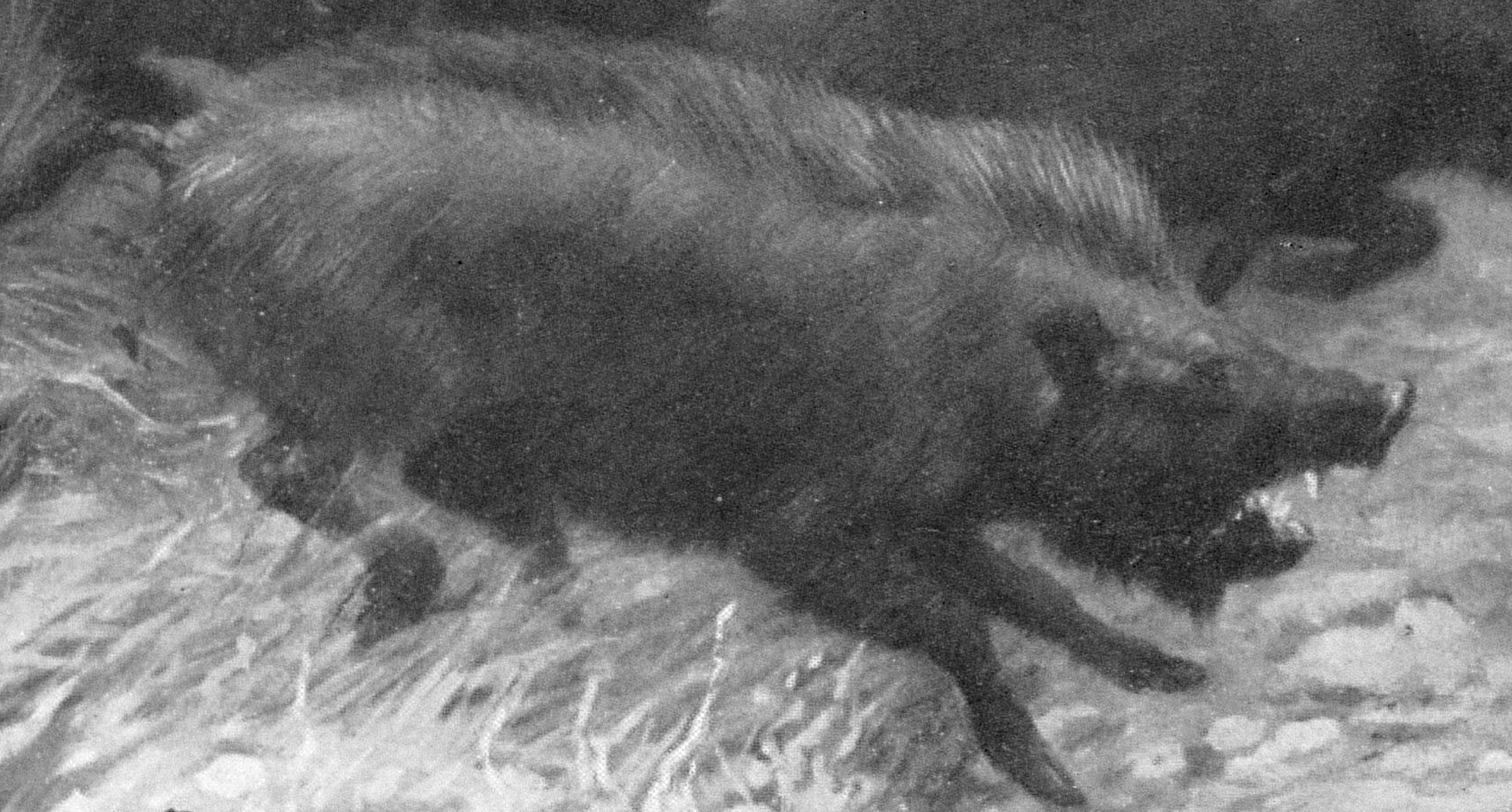
- Restoration of a herd of alarmed Miocene-Pleistocene peccaries of the genus Platygonus. Charles R. Knight (1922).
  †Platygonus
  - †Platygonus compressus
- †Pomoxis – or unidentified comparable form
- Populus
- †Probythinella
  - †Probythinella lacustris
- Pteridium
- Pungitius
  - †Pungitius pungitius – or unidentified comparable form
- Quercus
- †Rana
  - †Rana catesbeiana
  - †Rana clamitans
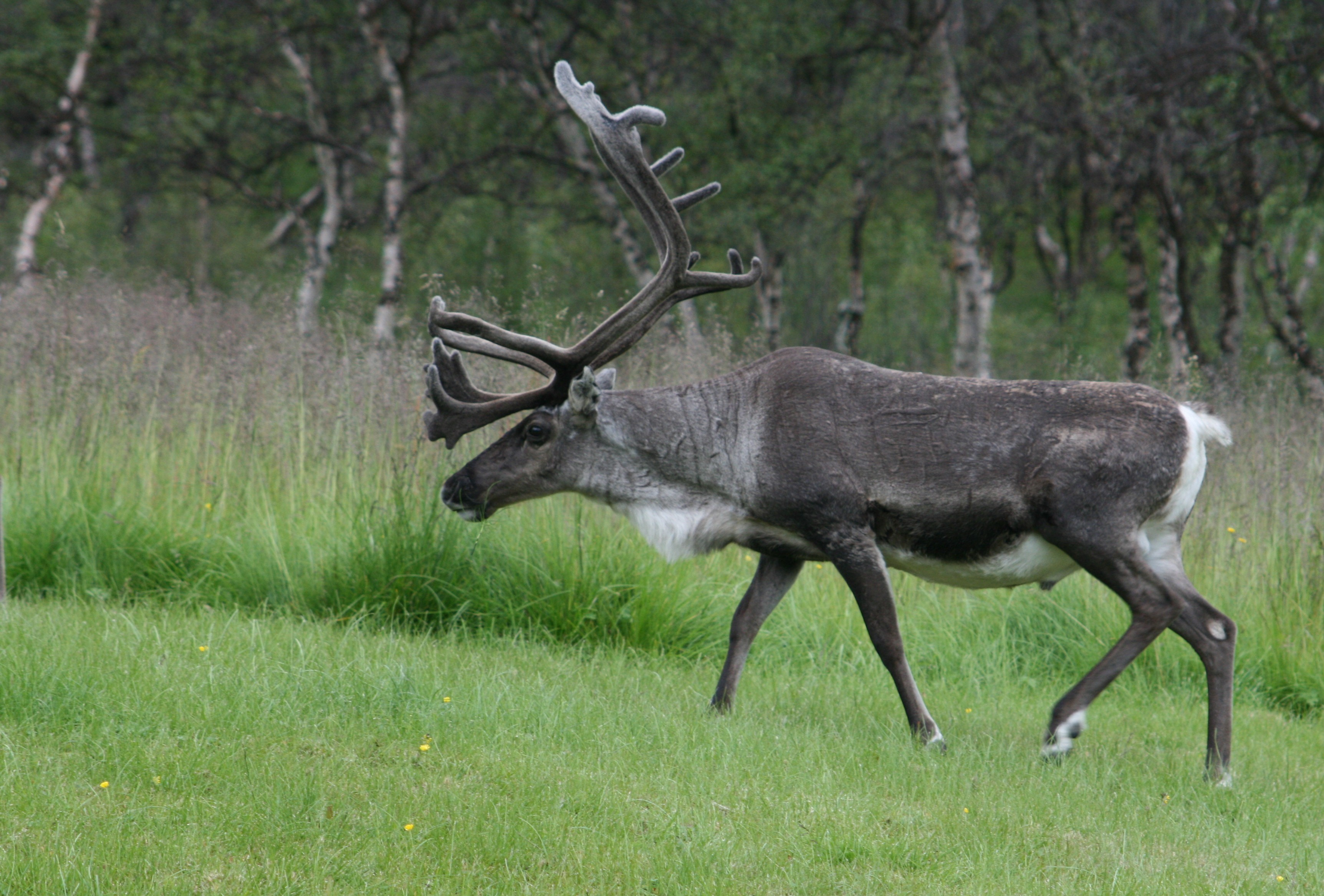
- Rangifer
  Rangifer
- Salix
- †Selaginella
- †Shepherdia
  - †Shepherdia argentea
- Sorex
  - †Sorex hoyi
- Sphaerium
  - †Sphaerium striatinum
- Sphagnum
- Stagnicola
  - †Stagnicola elodes
- †Thalictrum
- †Thuja
- Tilia
- †Tsuga
- Typha
- Ulmus
- Ursus
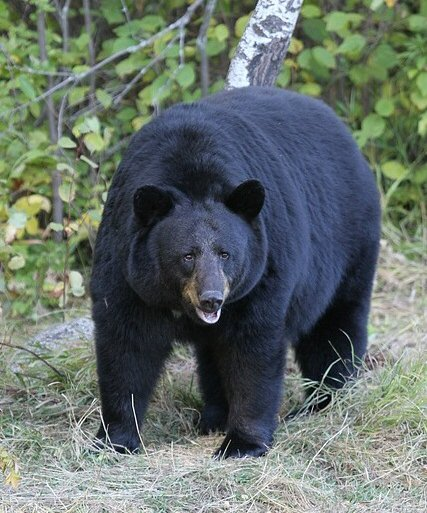
  - A living Ursus americanus, or American black bear
    †Ursus americanus
- Vallonia
  - †Vallonia costata
- Valvata
  - †Valvata sincera
  - †Valvata tricarinata
- Vertigo
  - †Vertigo alpestris
  - †Vertigo elatior
  - †Vertigo gouldi – or unidentified comparable form
  - †Vertigo hannai
  - †Vertigo modesta
  - †Vertigo morsei
  - †Vertigo ovata
  - †Vertigo paradoxa
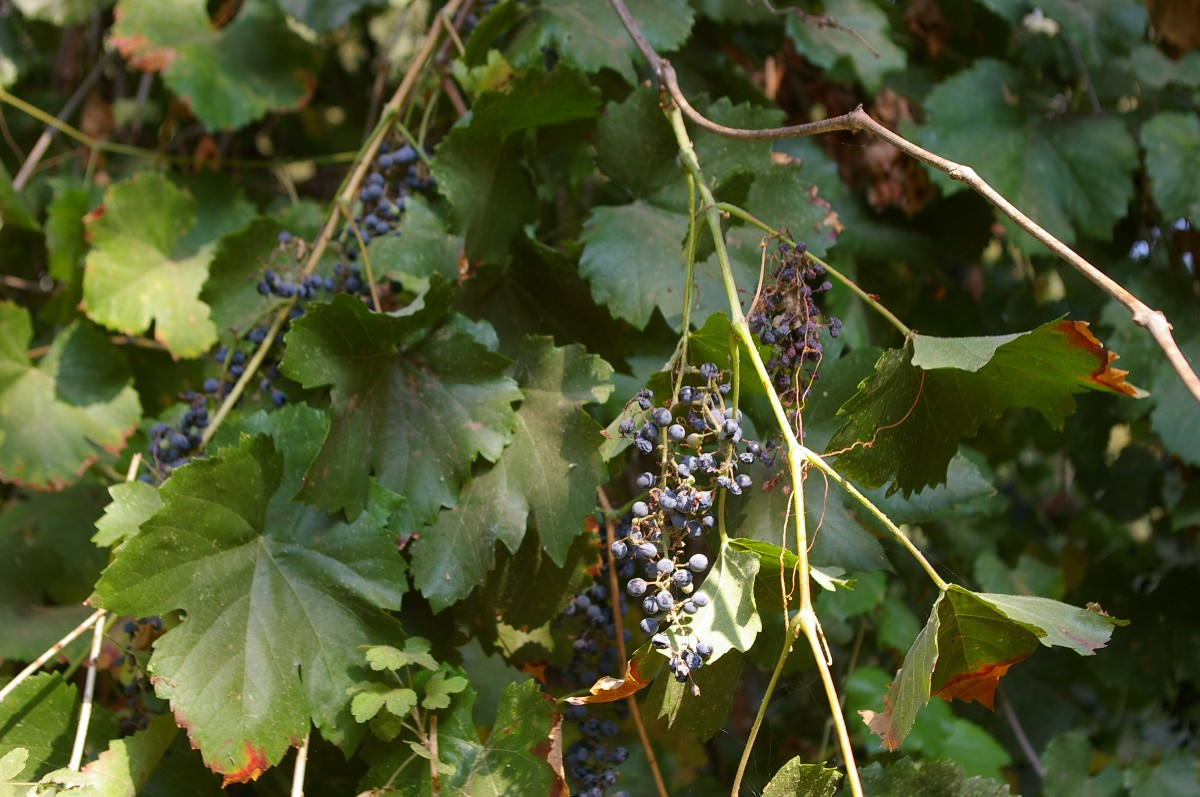
- Leaves and fruit of a living Vitis, or grapevine
  Vitis
- Zapus
  - †Zapus hudsonius – or unidentified comparable form
- Zonitoides
  - †Zonitoides aboreas
