= Acanthopus =

Acanthopus may refer to:

- Acanthopus, a genus of beetles in the family Scarabaeidae, synonym of Anacanthodes
- Acanthopus, a genus of crickets in the family Anostostomatidae, synonym of Leiomelus
- Acanthopus, a genus of ostracods in the family Cytherideidae, synonym of Cytherissa
