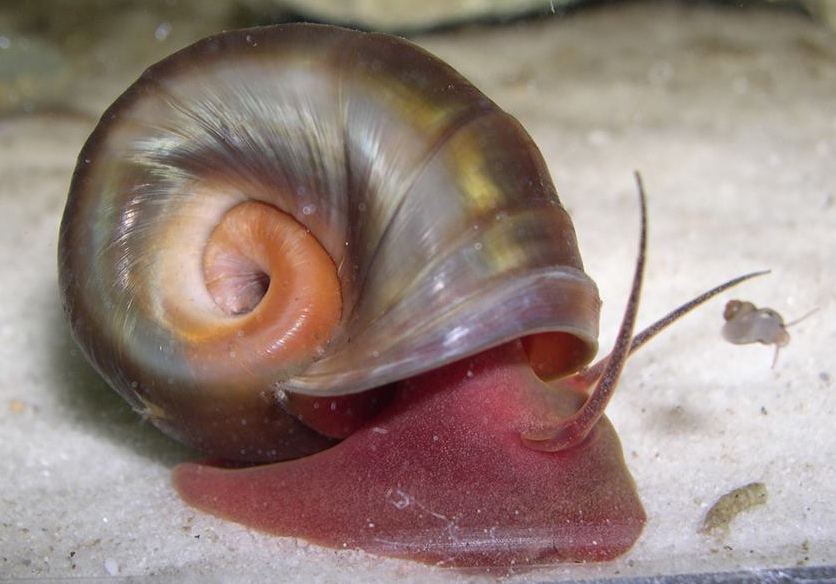
- Specimen

Conservation status
- Vulnerable (IUCN 2.3)

- Endangered (ESA)

Scientific classification
- Kingdom: Animalia
- Phylum: Mollusca
- Class: Gastropoda
- Superorder: Hygrophila
- Family: Planorbidae
- Genus: Planorbella
- Species: P. magnifica

Binomial name
- Planorbella magnifica (Pilsbry, 1903)

= Planorbella magnifica =

Species of gastropod

Planorbella magnifica, the magnificent ramshorn, is a species of small, freshwater, air-breathing snail, a pulmonate gastropod mollusc in the family Planorbidae, the ram's horn snails. This species is endemic to the United States.
