= Planorbella multivolvis =

Conservation status
- Extinct (IUCN 2.3)

- Presumed Extinct (NatureServe)

Scientific classification
- Kingdom: Animalia
- Phylum: Mollusca
- Class: Gastropoda
- Superorder: Hygrophila
- Family: Planorbidae
- Genus: Planorbella
- Species: †P. multivolvis

Binomial name
- †Planorbella multivolvis (Case, 1847)

Species of gastropod

Planorbella multivolvis, the acorn ramshorn, was a species of small freshwater air-breathing snail, a pulmonate gastropod mollusk in the family Planorbidae, the ram's horn snails.

This species was endemic to the state of Michigan in the United States. It was last documented in 1907 and is now considered to be extinct.

The species was described to science in 1847 by William Case, who used the specific epithet "multivolvis" because the shells of this snail have a greater number of whorls than other members of the genus. The known range of the species was Howe Lake, in Marquette County, Michigan. It is thought that the species lived in the deeper waters of the lake, and came to shallow water only for the purposes of spawning. A possible cause of population decline is the introduction of sport fish to Howe Lake, which began in 1905, two years prior to the last known sighting of the species. A survey was conducted in 1989 and failed to locate any individuals.
