= Planorbella oregonensis =

Conservation status
- Vulnerable (IUCN 3.1)

- Critically Imperiled (NatureServe)

Scientific classification
- Kingdom: Animalia
- Phylum: Mollusca
- Class: Gastropoda
- Superorder: Hygrophila
- Family: Planorbidae
- Genus: Planorbella
- Species: P. oregonensis

Binomial name
- Planorbella oregonensis (Tryon, 1865)

Species of gastropod

Planorbella oregonensis is a species of gastropod belonging to the family Planorbidae. The species is found in Western North America. It is listed as vulnerable on the IUCN Red List.
