= Planorbella columbiensis =

Conservation status
- Critically endangered, possibly extinct (IUCN 3.1)

- Possibly Extinct (NatureServe)

Scientific classification
- Kingdom: Animalia
- Phylum: Mollusca
- Class: Gastropoda
- Superorder: Hygrophila
- Family: Planorbidae
- Genus: Planorbella
- Species: P. columbiensis

Binomial name
- Planorbella columbiensis (F.C.Baker, 1945)

Synonyms
- Helisoma columbiense F. C. Baker, 1945; Planorbella columbiense (F. C. Baker, 1945)

Species of freshwater snail

Planorbella columbiensis, commonly known as the caribou ramshorn, is a species of freshwater snail found in only one site, on Lac la Hache, in British Columbia, Canada.

This species is listed as "possibly extinct". Its first and last observations were in 1945.

== Description ==
Based on the original description, the height of the shell can be as much as 8.7 mm (0.34 in), and its greater diameter 19.1 mm (0.75 in).
