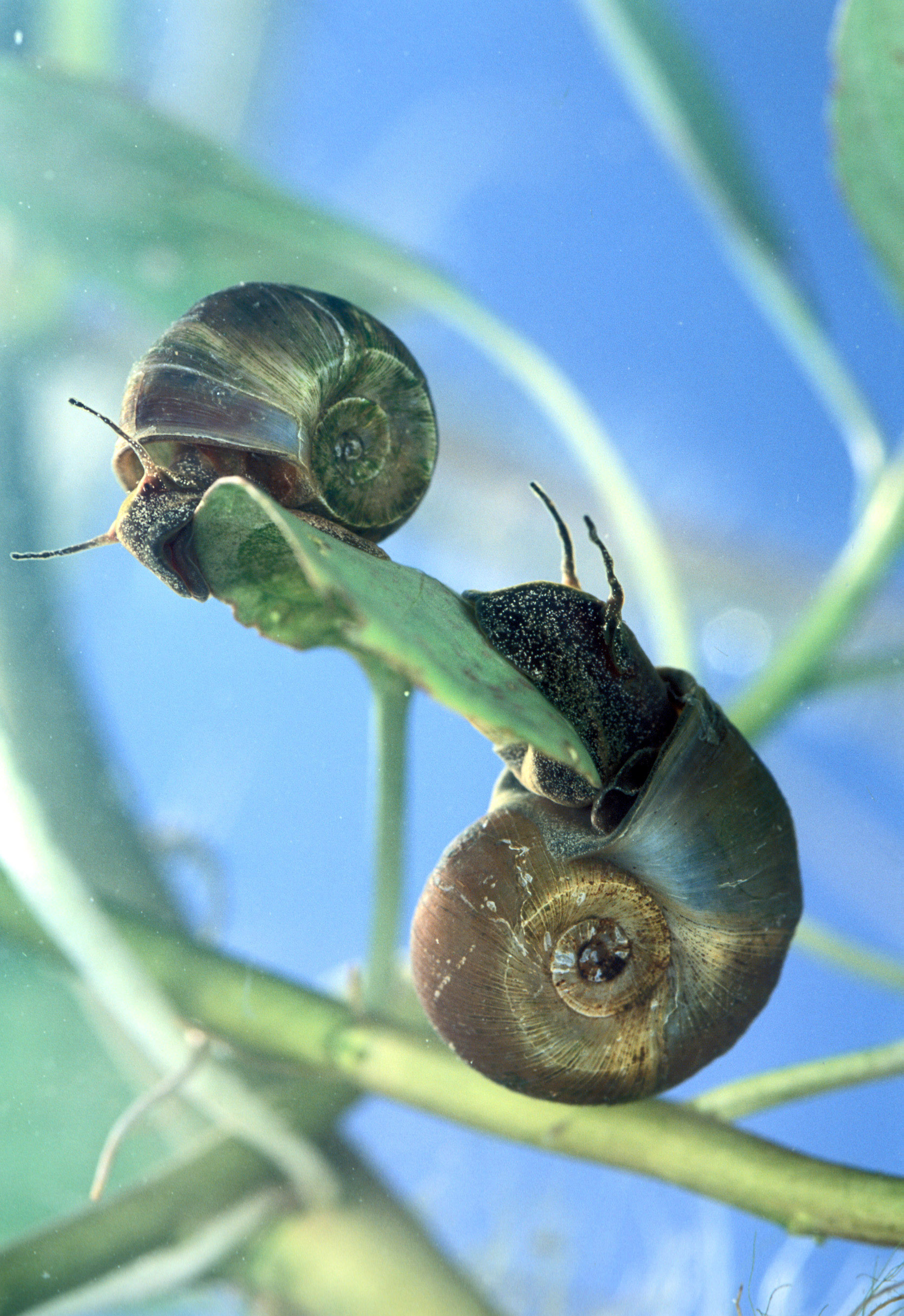
- Two specimen of Planorbella trivolvis in their natural environment, on aquatic vegetation

Conservation status
- Secure (NatureServe)

Scientific classification
- Kingdom: Animalia
- Phylum: Mollusca
- Class: Gastropoda
- Superorder: Hygrophila
- Family: Planorbidae
- Genus: Planorbella
- Species: P. trivolvis

Binomial name
- Planorbella trivolvis (Say, 1817)

Synonyms
- Helisoma trivolvis (Say, 1817); Planorbis trivolvis Say, 1817 (original combination)

= Planorbella trivolvis =

Species of gastropod

Planorbella trivolvis is a species of freshwater air-breathing snail, an aquatic pulmonate gastropod mollusk in the family Planorbidae, the ram's horn snails, or planorbids, which all have sinistral or left-coiling shells.

== Description ==
All species within family Planorbidae have sinistral shells. The width of the shell of this species is up to 18 mm.

== Distribution ==
This pond snail is native to North America, from the Arctic areas of Canada all the way south to Florida. It has also been introduced in other parts of the world. Recent genetic analysis of western U.S. populations of Planorbella trivolvis found that most genetic variation occurs within and among local populations rather than between watersheds, and that geographic distance did not predict genetic distance — a pattern attributed to long-distance dispersal by migratory waterfowl.

- Peru
- Dominica

== Habitat ==
This species prefers habitats with floating water weeds.

== Parasites ==
- Planorbella trivolvis is an intermediate host for Echinostoma trivolvis.
