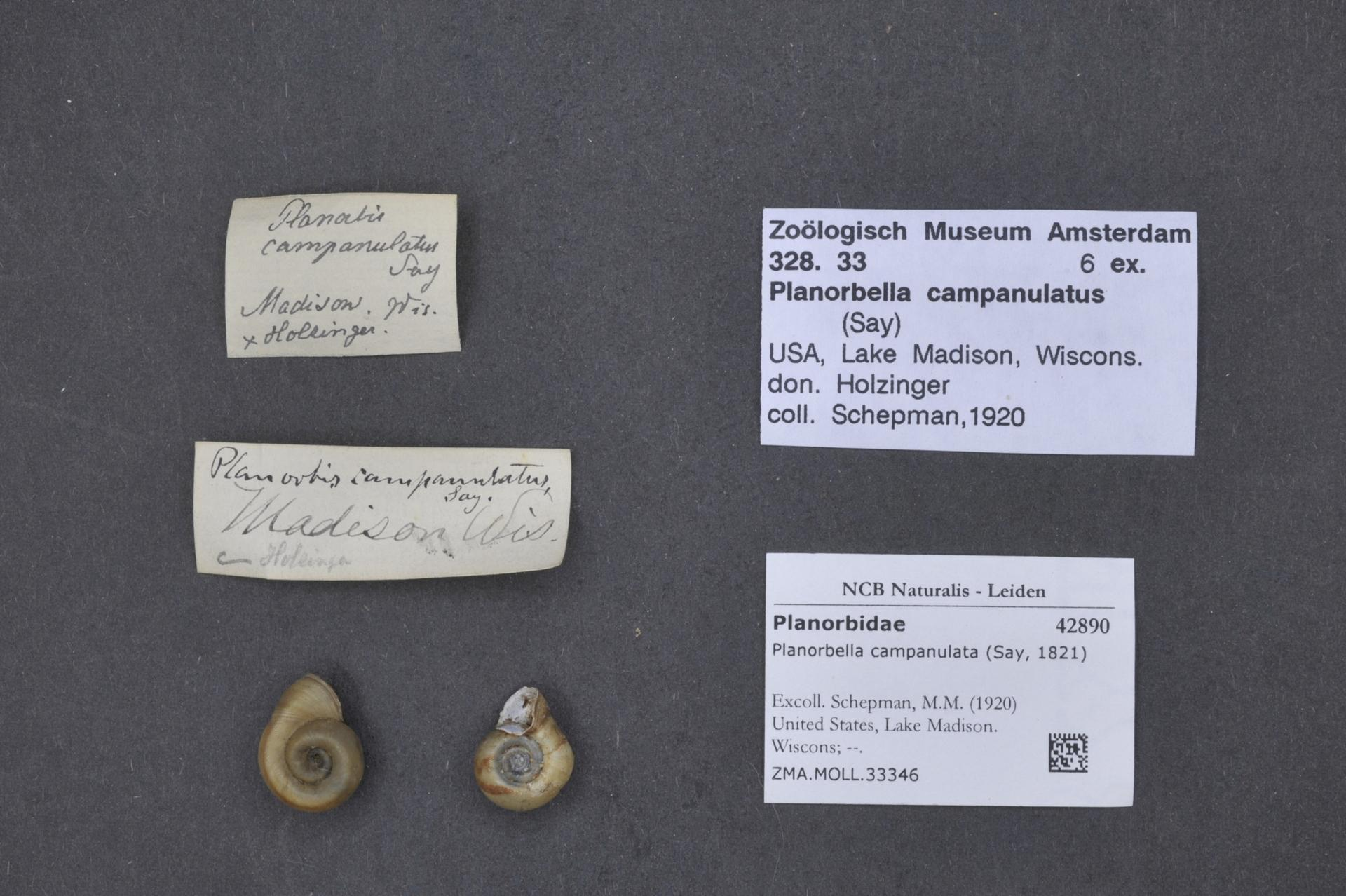

Conservation status
- Secure (NatureServe)

Scientific classification
- Kingdom: Animalia
- Phylum: Mollusca
- Class: Gastropoda
- Superorder: Hygrophila
- Family: Planorbidae
- Genus: Planorbella
- Species: P. campanulata

Binomial name
- Planorbella campanulata (Say, 1821)

= Planorbella campanulata =

Species of gastropod

Planorbella campanulata is a species of gastropods belonging to the family Planorbidae.

The species is found in Northern America.
