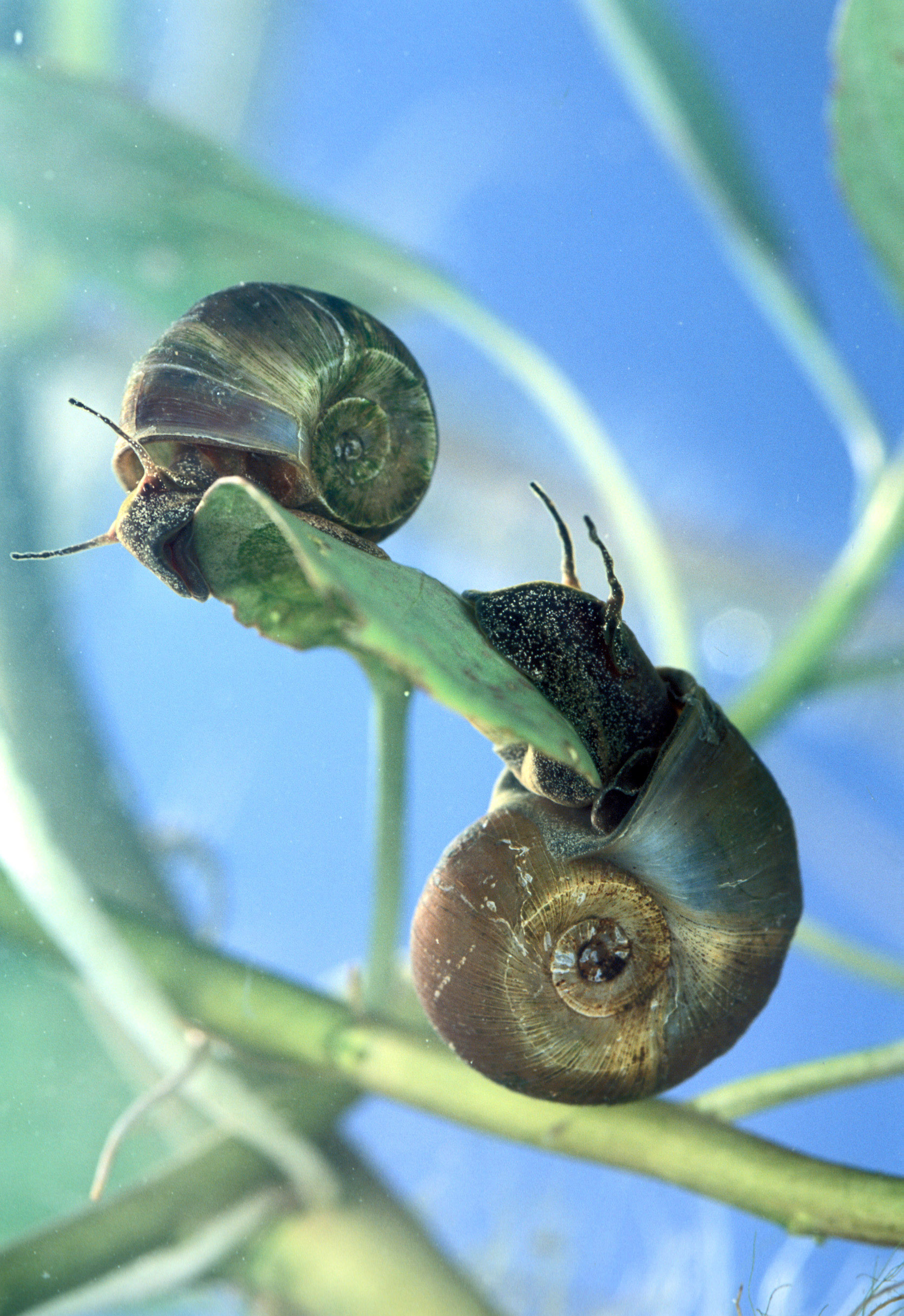
- Planorbella trivolvis

Scientific classification
- Kingdom: Animalia
- Phylum: Mollusca
- Class: Gastropoda
- Superorder: Hygrophila
- Family: Planorbidae
- Subfamily: Planorbinae
- Tribe: Helisomatini
- Genus: Planorbella; Haldeman, 1843

= Planorbella =

Planorbella Temporal range: Miocene–Recent

Genus of gastropods

Planorbella is a genus of freshwater air-breathing snails, aquatic pulmonate gastropod mollusks in the family Planorbidae, the ram's horn snails, or planorbids, which all have sinistral, or left-coiling, shells. The Planorbella genus is not known to be colonial but are very plentiful and occur in large groupings. This genus is commonly found within North America, and is also found within various countries in Europe, including Iceland, Spain, Germany, France, Ukraine, and others. Over time, an increased amount of unintentional releases of the snails has led to Planorbella being found in more non-native areas like Siberia. Some of the earliest fossil records date back to the Miocene.

== Ecology ==
Planorbella are often algae grazers, and in some locations such as oligotrophic sloughs, they may be a dominant element of total ecosystem biomass and hence system integrity. These snails are really important within freshwater ecosystems and are often used within research to study the exposures to toxicants like insecticides and heavy metals. Within freshwater habitats, competition occurs alongside these anthropogenic effects and tadpoles are known for reducing the survival and reproduction of planorbid snails by taking their food source which is periphyton. From competition as well as exposure to pesticides, planorbid snails were unable to produce as many eggs as they would have if they were healthy, which can have an effect on their population levels. One such species, the Magnificent Rams-horn snail (Planorbella magnifica) was classified as endangered in 2023 and has had no specimens in natural habitats since 2004.

These have a variety of predators including turtles, ducks crayfish and leeches. Predation of eggs by some Planaria has also been observed.

== Planorbella and parasite interactions ==
Planorbella are also known to be a vector for a diverse number of parasites, including nematodes and trematodes that can negatively impact the health and lifespan of the snail. Acanthocephalans use Planorbella species as an intermediate host; juveniles reside within the snail to then infect any turtle that preys upon the infected individuals. One of the most notable diseases caused by parasites within Planorbella is Schistosomiasis or swimmers itch and is well studied for its impact on humans.

Species in this genus are sometimes hosts for parasites, constituting a link in the pathway of infection for higher animals. For example, some species of Planorbella host rediae and cercariae stages of the parasite Ribeiroia, prior to ultimate infection of the Rough-skinned Newt.

== Distribution and habitat ==
Planorbidae, the family of Planorbella, have species that live in North America, Europe and Asia. Their dispersal throughout the globe is through migration by young snails attaching themselves to migratory birds. Beetles also show that they can distribute the snails on the wings. Planorbella also migrate locally through flooding of rivers and other water bodies they would inhabit.

The habitat of Planorbella are littoral zones, the shallow end of ponds, and in other freshwater systems typically no more than fifteen feet deep. Few subgroups of Planorbidae may live in deeper bodies of water in Europe and Asia, although the family as a whole is regarded as a shallow freshwater snail species.

== Anatomy and morphology ==
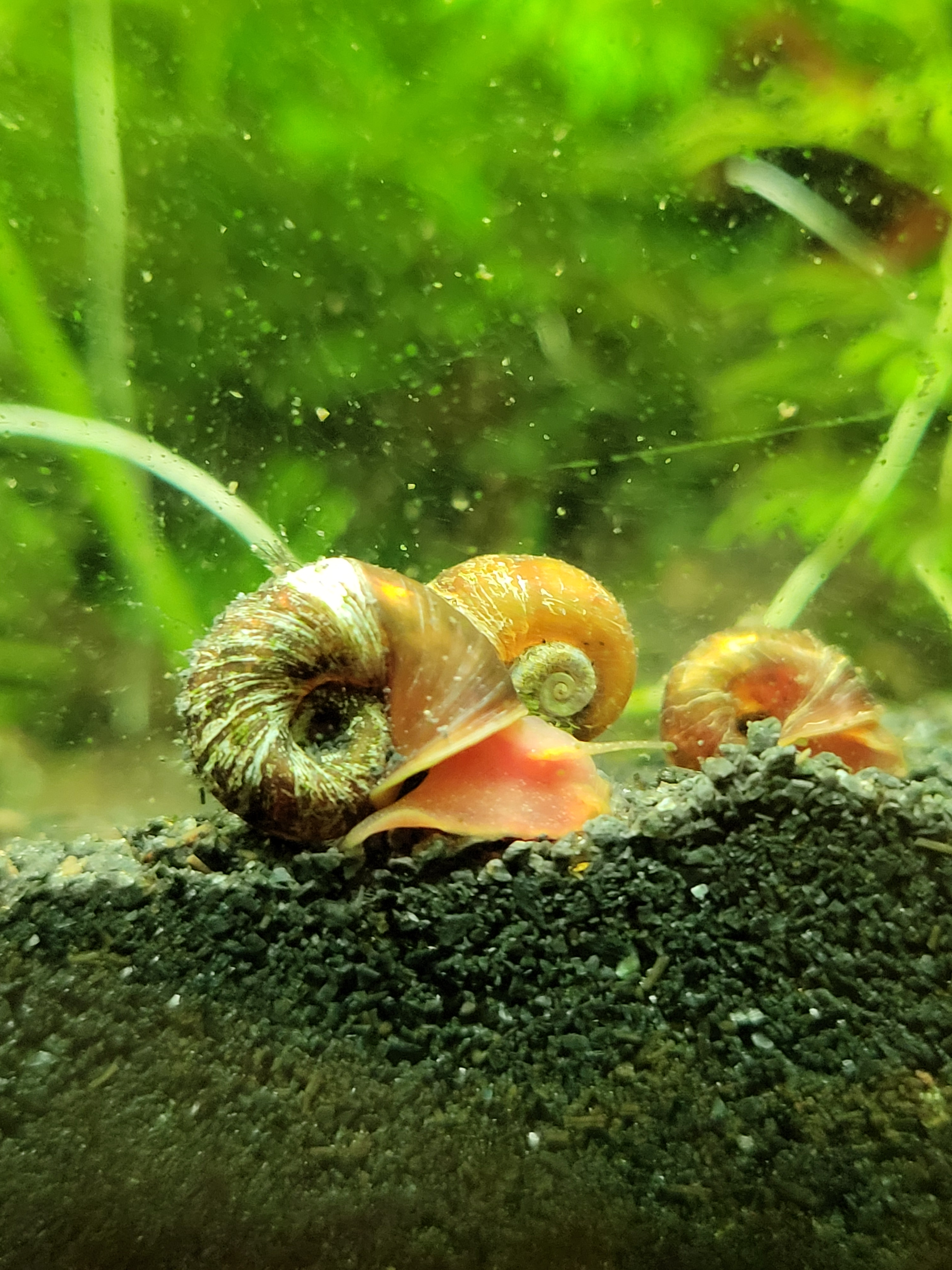
Group of Planorbella from an aquarium. Shells showing the characteristic ramshorn shape.

The average size of an adult planorbid shell is around 10mm in diameter and their apex, the origin of the shell, is usually located in the middle. The shell usually takes on natural colours that range from a light to darker brown. The common name "rams-horn snail" is because the coiling of the shell looks like that of a ram's horn. Extending from the snail's shell, the foot of the snail covers the entire ventral side and then on the dorsal side, the head with tentacles, eyes, and a mouth are located anteriorly. Distinctive traits of their family, Planorbidae, include: the external gills called a pseudobranch, a simple mantle, and the lack of operculum which is a small rigid structure that acts as a barrier between an animal and the outside world.

== Reproduction ==
Planorbid snails, as most other gastropods, are simultaneous hermaphrodites which means they contain both male and female reproductive organs and individuals are both sexes though their entire adult lives. Because of their planar shell shape they are able to sexually reproduce face to face which allows them mate reciprocally (as opposed to genera with high spiraling shells that must mate asymmetrically and are usually limited to one role at a time). Each partner will generally exchange sperm which they can store and use to produce many egg masses. After mating, egg laying often begins after 19 days and can continue for as long as 18 weeks before needing to mate again. Over this period of time they are capable of laying a total of over 5000 eggs. Up to 20 eggs are laid in a gelatinous egg sac (or egg mass) on aquatic vegetation or hard surfaces at a given time. These eggs will hatch into juveniles within 2 weeks. While there may be differences amongst species, Planorbella trivolvis snails reach sexual maturity at around 15 weeks of age and the average lifespan of these snails is around 2 years.

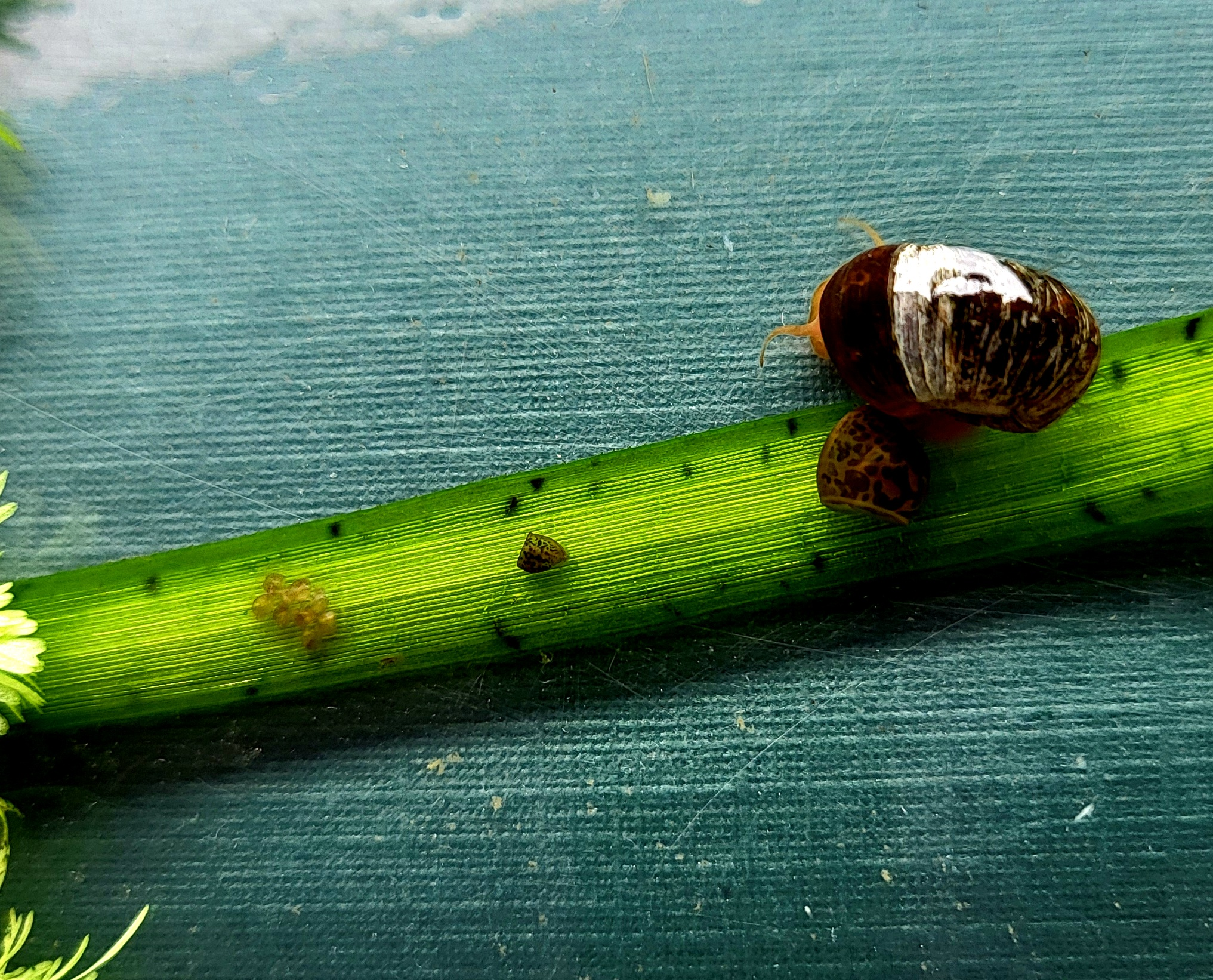
Photo of Planorbella snails from an aquarium, from left to right is an egg case containing developing snails, 2 juvenile snails at different ages and an adult on the far right.

Planorbid snails also have the capacity to reproduce asexually by self-fertilization, however it is not preferred; and for some species, their viability often suffers as a result. Snails who fail to mate may not lay eggs, some choosing not to produce any offspring at all over their lifetimes without mating. If eggs are laid, the egg masses are significantly smaller (containing only one or a few eggs) and are far less likely to hatch.

== Behaviours ==
=== Predator avoidance ===
Mollusks like planorbid snails have slow locomotion and are unable to flee from predators quickly so in order to survive, their behaviour alters when dealing with animals that might eat them. When predators like turtles are around them within freshwater habitats, they often try to hide in substrate by burying themselves or they will stop roaming in areas where they can be easily spotted. Some snails like P. trivolvis will crawl out of the water in order to escape some predators that do not leave the water. Crawling out of the water, while escaping aquatic predators, leaves them more at risk to aerial ones which can increase the transmission rate of certain parasites that could be using the snail as a host.

=== Heavy metal exposure ===
In freshwater habitats, there are heavy metals that can enter these ecosystems through run-off waters or by leaching through the soil. Coal burning power plants can produce heavy metals like aluminum oxide and iron oxide through byproducts such as coal fly ash. Heavy metals are also able to enter through other anthropogenic sources, such as agricultural practices, mining, and industrial processes. Embryos as well as other juvenile planorbid snails had an increased mortality rate under exposures to lead and cadmium, and their development was slowed down. Adult snails were able to tolerate the exposure initially but mortality can occur after a week. Overall, behaviours in the snails, such as their speed and acceleration, can be altered and reproduction declines, leading to lower populations. After adult planorbid snails are exposed to copper, they are less likely to produce offspring that go through a normal development cycle. The juveniles of the exposed adults develop slower, which could mean that the adults were unable to gain enough energy through feeding to pass into the egg production.

=== Parasitism ===
As stated within the Ecology section, Planorbella can be targeted as hosts for parasites. Trematodes often use mollusks as intermediate hosts when they parasitize organisms and through doing so, it can change the chemical signalling pathways of the planorbid snails. One specific chemical that can be altered is Oxylipins which have a role within the functionality of the snails' immune system, physiology, and responding to stress put on the organism. Changes in the profiles of oxylipins within infected snails can help the parasite in transmission to their next host or it is suggested that the snail can be trying to get rid of the trematode from their body. When parasites such as trematodes invade other snail genuses, the scent of the infected snail is altered to make Planorbella more attracted to them, and can make it more likely for the trematodes to transfer from the original host to the planorbid snail.

== Taxonomy ==
The genus Planorbella was considered to be in genus Helisoma under a subgenus level before it was reclassified to a genus level. This was done by Haldeman in 1843. Multiple species previously within Helisoma were moved over to Planorbella, and as such, some are still considered as 'ramshorn snails' which is also the common name for Helisoma. There are still some uncertainties within the family Planorbidae on a species level which led to the confusion of rankings. While important within ecology-based research within ecosystem health and parasite-host interactions, researchers are still learning about the phylogenetic relationships between planorbid species. Using mitochondrial genome sequencing, two species of Planorbella (P. duryi and P. pilsbryi) were confirmed to be monophyletic and helps support the separation of Planorbella from Helisoma.

== Species ==
The 25 (24 extant and 1 extinct) species within the genus Planorbella include:

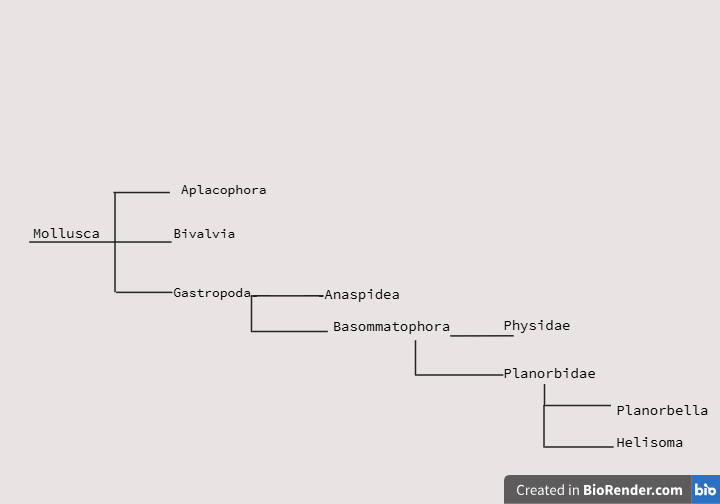
Planorbella Taxonomic Tree

- Planorbella ammon (A. Gould, 1855)
- Planorbella binneyi (Tryon, 1867)
- Planorbella caloderma (Pilsbry, 1923)
- Planorbella campanulata (Say, 1821)
- Planorbella columbiensis (F. C. Baker, 1945)
- Planorbella contrerasi (Pilsbry, 1920)
- Planorbella corpulenta (Say, 1824)
- Planorbella costaricensis (Preston, 1907)
- Planorbella duryi (Wetherby, 1879)
- Planorbella fovealis (Menke, 1830)
- Planorbella magnifica (Pilsbry, 1903)
- †Planorbella multivolvis (Case, 1847)
- Planorbella nigricans (Spix, 1827)
- Planorbella occidentalis (J. G. Cooper, 1870)
- Planorbella oregonensis (Tryon, 1865)
- Planorbella pilsbryi (F. C. Baker, 1926)
- Planorbella pseudotrivolvis (F. C. Baker, 1920)
- Planorbella scalaris (Jay, 1839)
- Planorbella smithii (F. C. Baker, 1912)
- Planorbella subcrenata (P. P. Carpenter, 1857)
- Planorbella tenuis (Dunker, 1850)
- Planorbella traskii (I. Lea, 1856)
- Planorbella trivolvis (Say, 1817)
- Planorbella truncata (Miles, 1861)
- Planorbella wyldi (Tristram, 1862)
