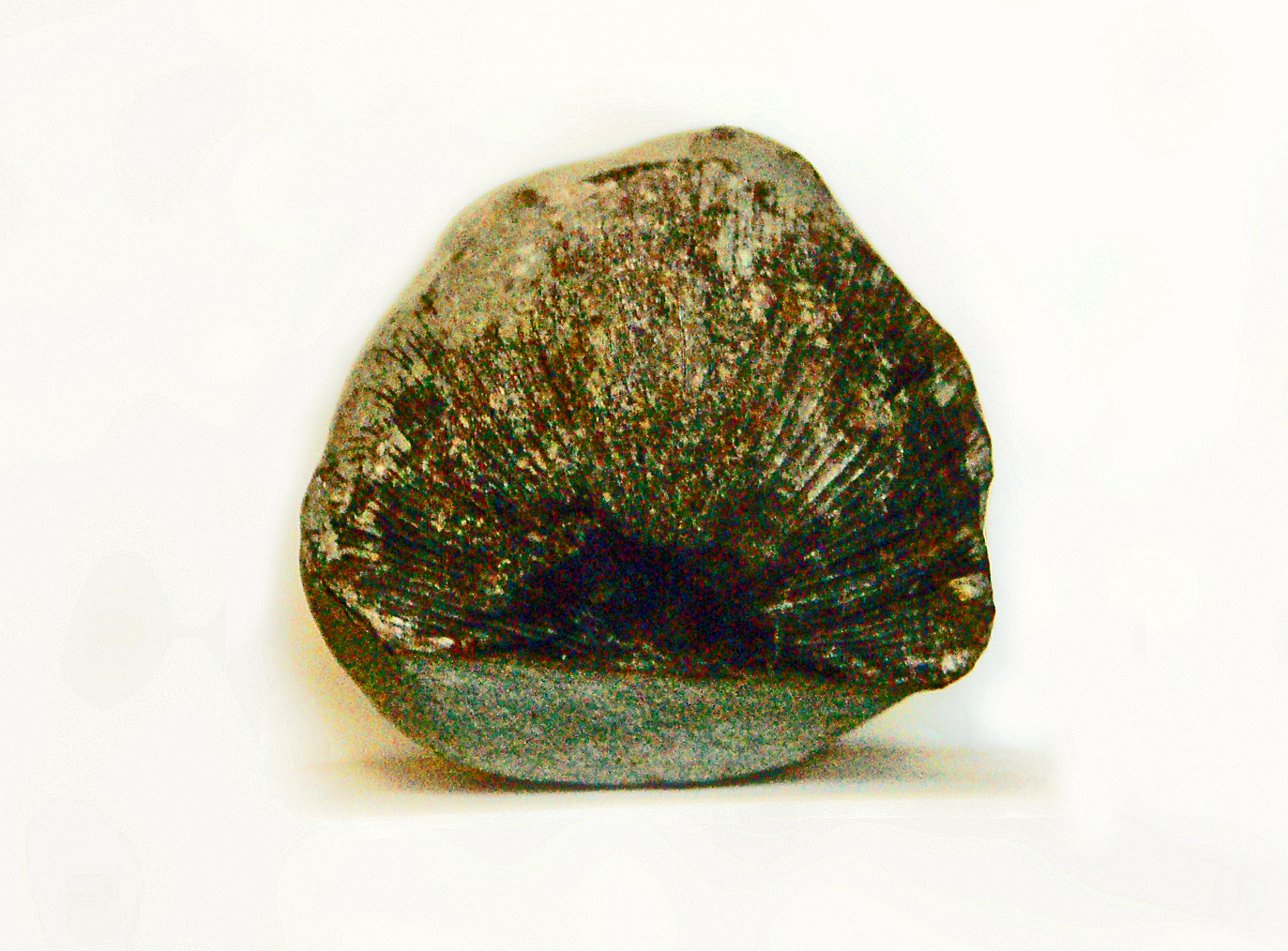
- Strophomena euglypha from Silurian period
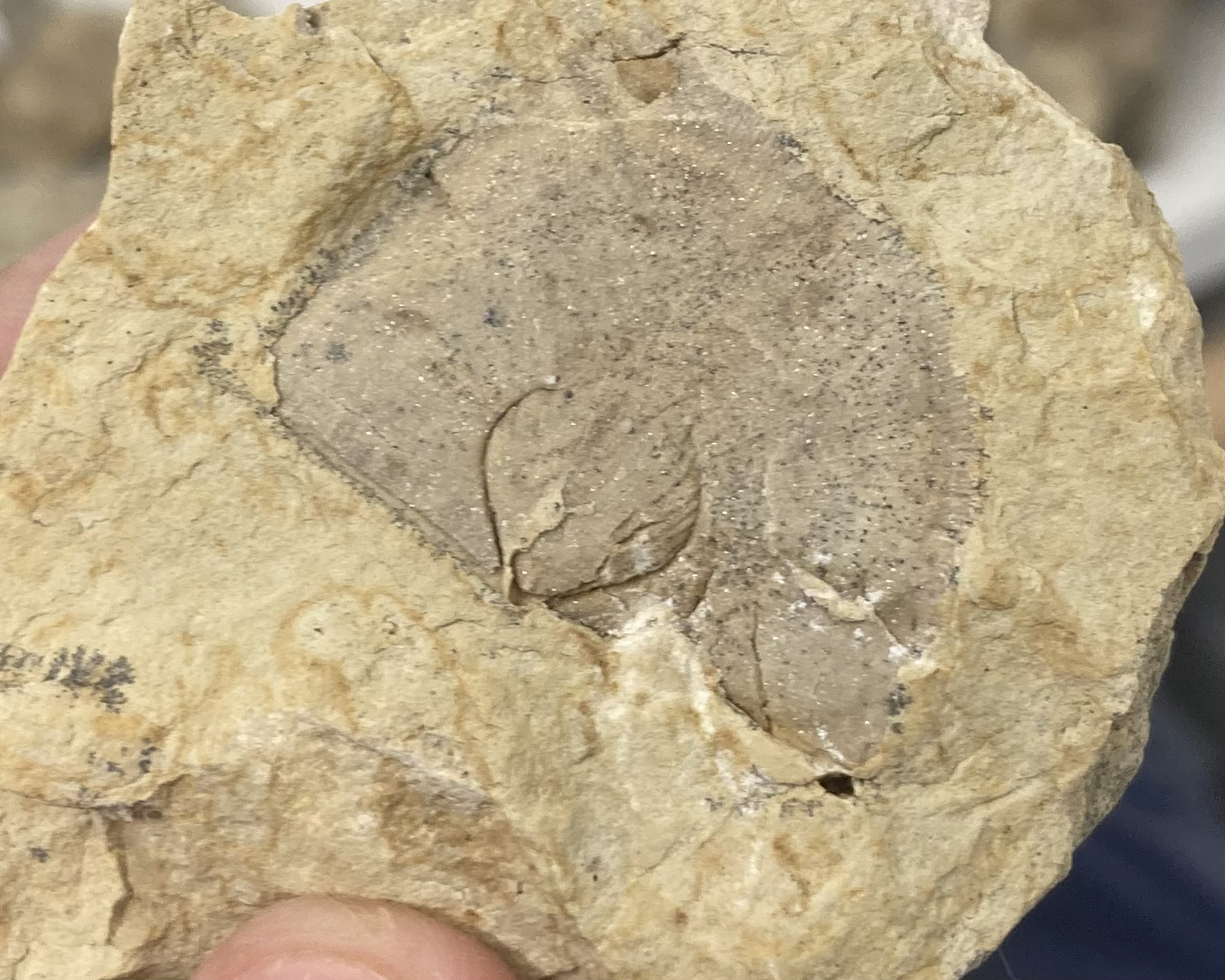
- A Strophomena sp. from Mount Horeb, Wisconsin

Scientific classification
- Kingdom: Animalia
- Phylum: Brachiopoda
- Class: †Strophomenata
- Order: †Strophomenida
- Family: †Strophomenidae
- Genus: †Strophomena; Rafinesque and De Blainville 1824

= Strophomena =

Strophomena Temporal range: Ordovician–Devonian

Genus of brachiopods

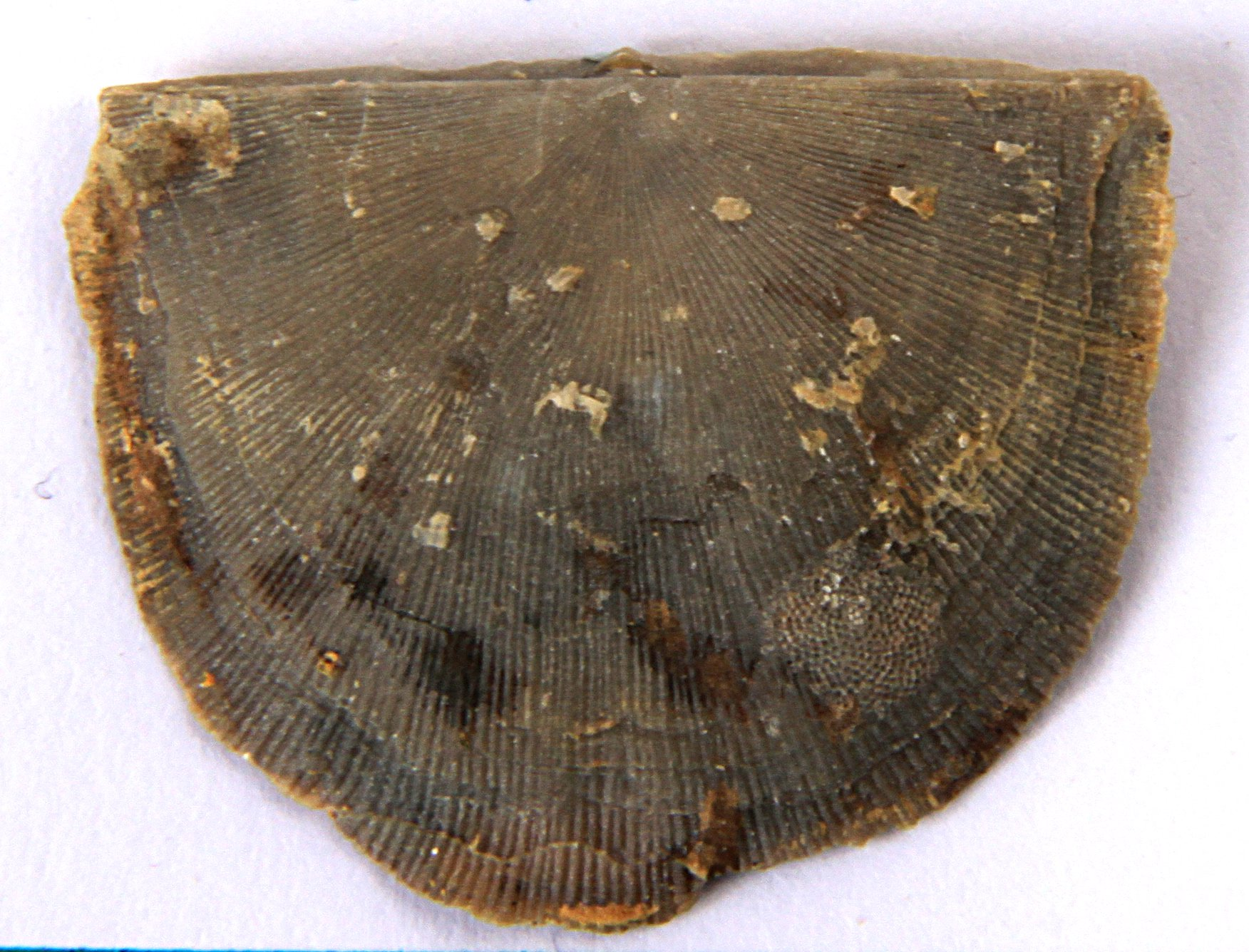
Strophomena costellata from Bromide Formation, Oklahoma, USA

Strophomena is a genus of brachiopods belonging to the family Strophomenidae in the order Strophomenida, named by Rafinesque in 1824. They were stationary epifaunal suspension feeders.

These brachiopods (often known as lamp shells) lived from the Ordovician period to the Devonian period.

== Distribution ==
Devonian of Italy, Silurian to Devonian of Algeria, Morocco; Silurian of Australia, Morocco, Russia, Sweden, United States; Ordovician of Australia, Canada, China, France, Ireland, Kazakhstan, Norway, Portugal, Russia, Spain, Sweden, the United Kingdom, United States; Llandeilo of China; Whiterockian of United States; Dawan of China; Arenig of China.

== Species ==
- Strophomena amoena
- Strophomena billingsi
- Strophomena concordensis
- Strophomena costellata
- Strophomena dignata
- Strophomena extensa
- Strophomena euglypha
- Strophomena filitexta
- Strophomena fluctuosa
- Strophomena hecuba
- Strophomena hirundo
- Strophomena incurvata
- Strophomena lenta
- Strophomena minuta
- Strophomena nutans
- Strophomena orthonurensis
- Strophomena perconcava
- Strophomena planumbona
- Strophomena plattinensis
- Strophomena rhomboidalis
- Strophomena striatissima
- Strophomena vetusta

== See also ==
- List of brachiopod genera
