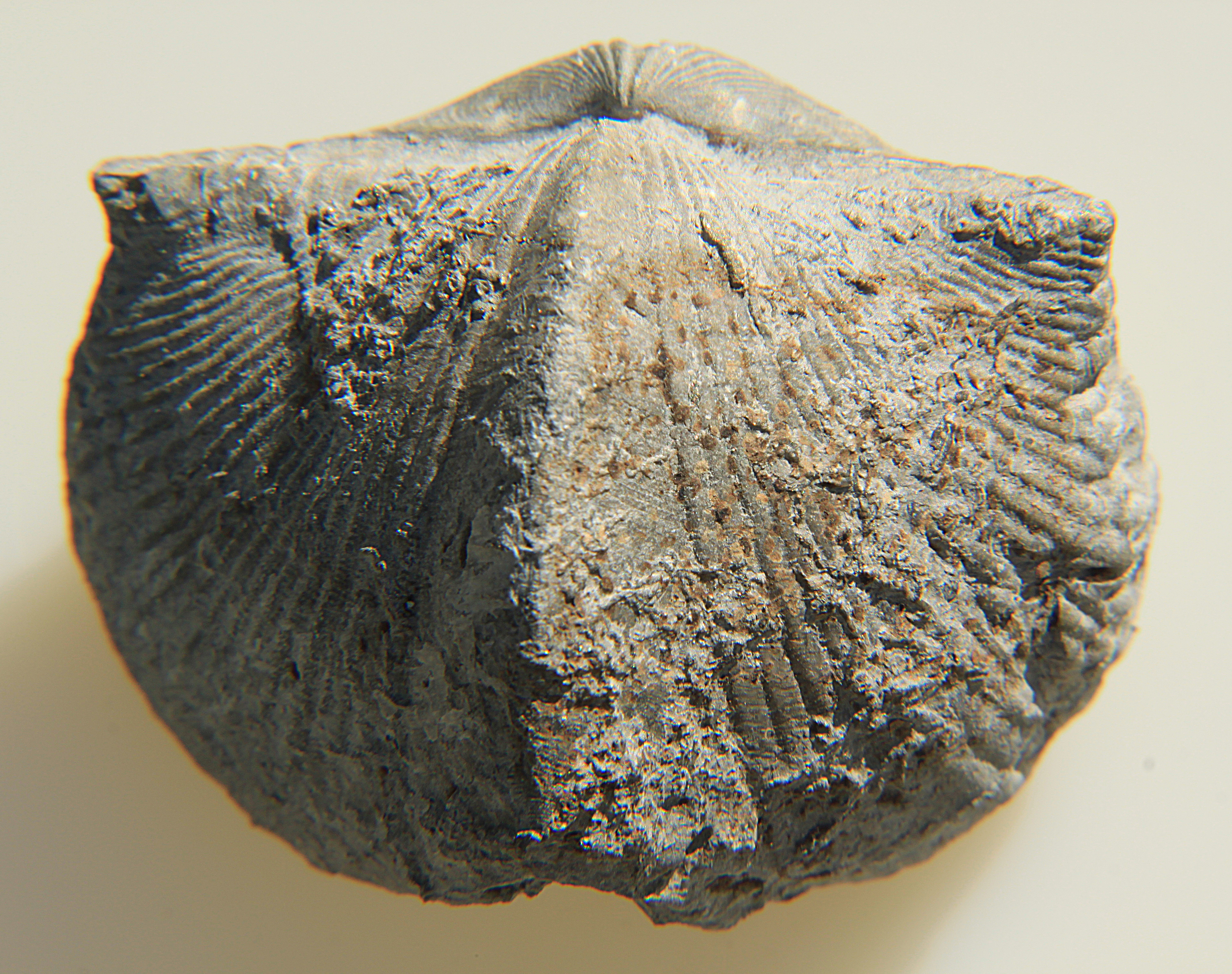
- Paraspirifer bownockeri, 42mm
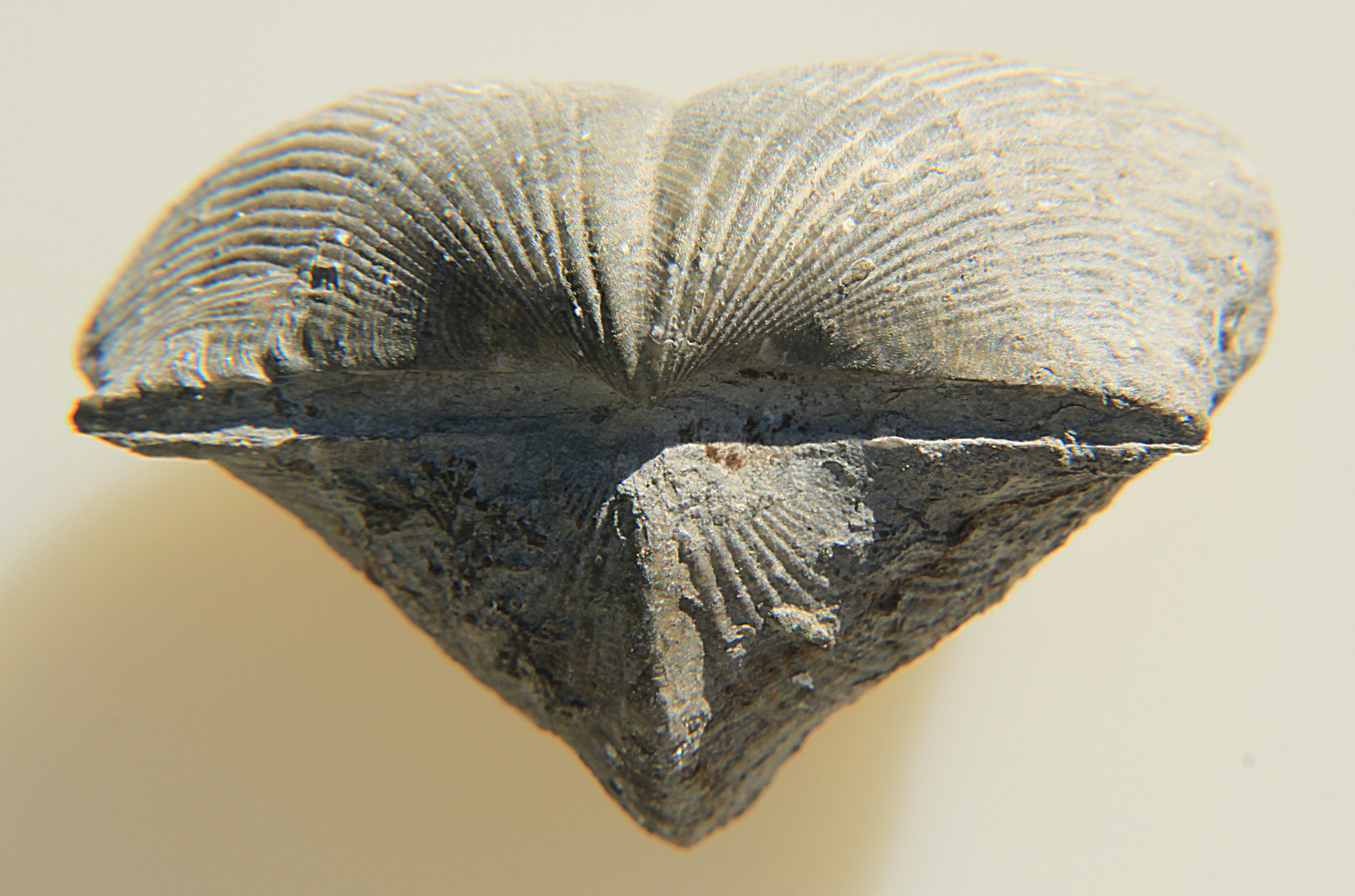

Scientific classification
- Kingdom: Animalia
- Phylum: Brachiopoda
- Class: Rhynchonellata
- Order: †Spiriferida
- Family: †Hysterolitidae
- Subfamily: †Paraspiriferinae
- Genus: †Paraspirifer; Wedekind, 1926

Species
- P. cultrijugatus (Roemer, 1844) (type species) = Spirifer cultrijugatus; P. acuminatus (Conrad, 1839); P. auriculatus (Sandberger, 1856); P. bownockeri Stewart, 1927; p. bucculentus Solle, 1971; P. chillonensis (Quintero & Revilla, 1966) = Histerolites chillonensis; P. curvatissimus Solle, 1971; P. eos Solle, 1971; P. globosa Solle, 1971; P. sandbergeri Solle, 1971

= Paraspirifer =

Paraspirifer Temporal range: Emsian-Givetian

Extinct genus of brachiopods

Paraspirifer is a genus of large brachiopods (up to about 7.5 centimetres or 3.0 inches) that lived during the late Lower and Middle Devonian in what now are Germany, Spain, Morocco and the United States (New York State and Ohio).

== Taxonomy ==
Paraspirifer developed from Brachyspirifer during the early upper Emsian (cancellata-elegans/Dalehe Event).

== Distribution ==
Paraspirifer originated in the lower upper Emsian and became extinct in Europe and Northern Africa at the end of the lower Eifelian. It survived into the Givetian in North America though.

- P. cultrijugatus is known from the Middle Devonian (Eifelian, Leudersdorf, near Üxheim, Eifel Hills, Germany).
- P. acuminatus occurs in the Middle Devonian of the United States (middle part of the Muscatatuck Group, Indiana)
- P. bownockeri is known from the Middle Devonian of the United States (Givetian of the Appalachian Basin: Lower Silica Formation, Western Ohio; Mount Marion Member of the Oatka Creek Formation and Mottville Member of the Skaneateles Formation, both Eastern and Central New York State).

== Ecology ==
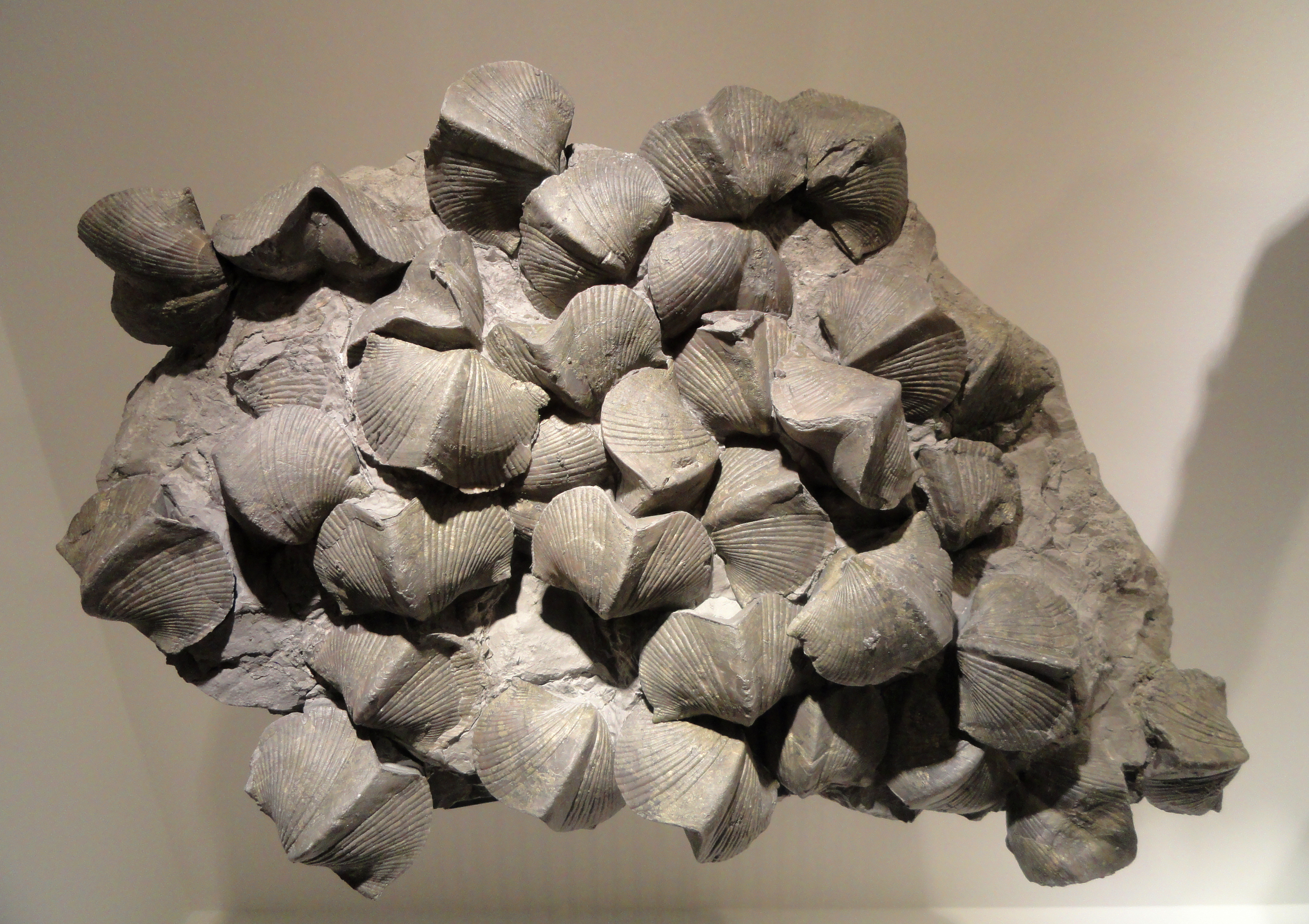
Natural cluster of Paraspirifer bownockeri from the Lower Silica Formation

From the type of deposits that contain Paraspirifer bownockeri it can be deduced that this species inhabited soft clay mudflats. Shells of this species hosted a wide range of epibionts, such as bryozoans, corals, echinoderms, annelid worms and other brachiopods. These epibionts are more numerous on the brachial valve than on the pedunculate valve, because this big brachiopod lay on its pedunculate valve after the degeneration of the stalk.
