= Cytherissa =

Scientific classification
- Kingdom: Animalia
- Phylum: Arthropoda
- Clade: Pancrustacea
- Class: Ostracoda
- Order: Podocopida
- Family: Cytherideidae
- Genus: Cytherissa; Sars, 1925

Genus of crustaceans

Cytherissa is a genus of crustaceans belonging to the family Cytherideidae.

The species of this genus are found in Europe, Russia and Northern America.

Species:

- Cytherissa lacustris (Sars, 1863)
- Cytherissa simplissima Swain
