= List of the prehistoric life of Tennessee =

This list of the prehistoric life of Tennessee contains the various prehistoric life-forms whose fossilized remains have been reported from within the US state of Tennessee.

== Precambrian ==
The Paleobiology Database records no known occurrences of Precambrian fossils in Alabama.

== Paleozoic ==
=== Selected Paleozoic taxa of Tennessee ===
- †Acodus
- †Actinoceras
- †Actinocrinites
- †Agaricocrinus
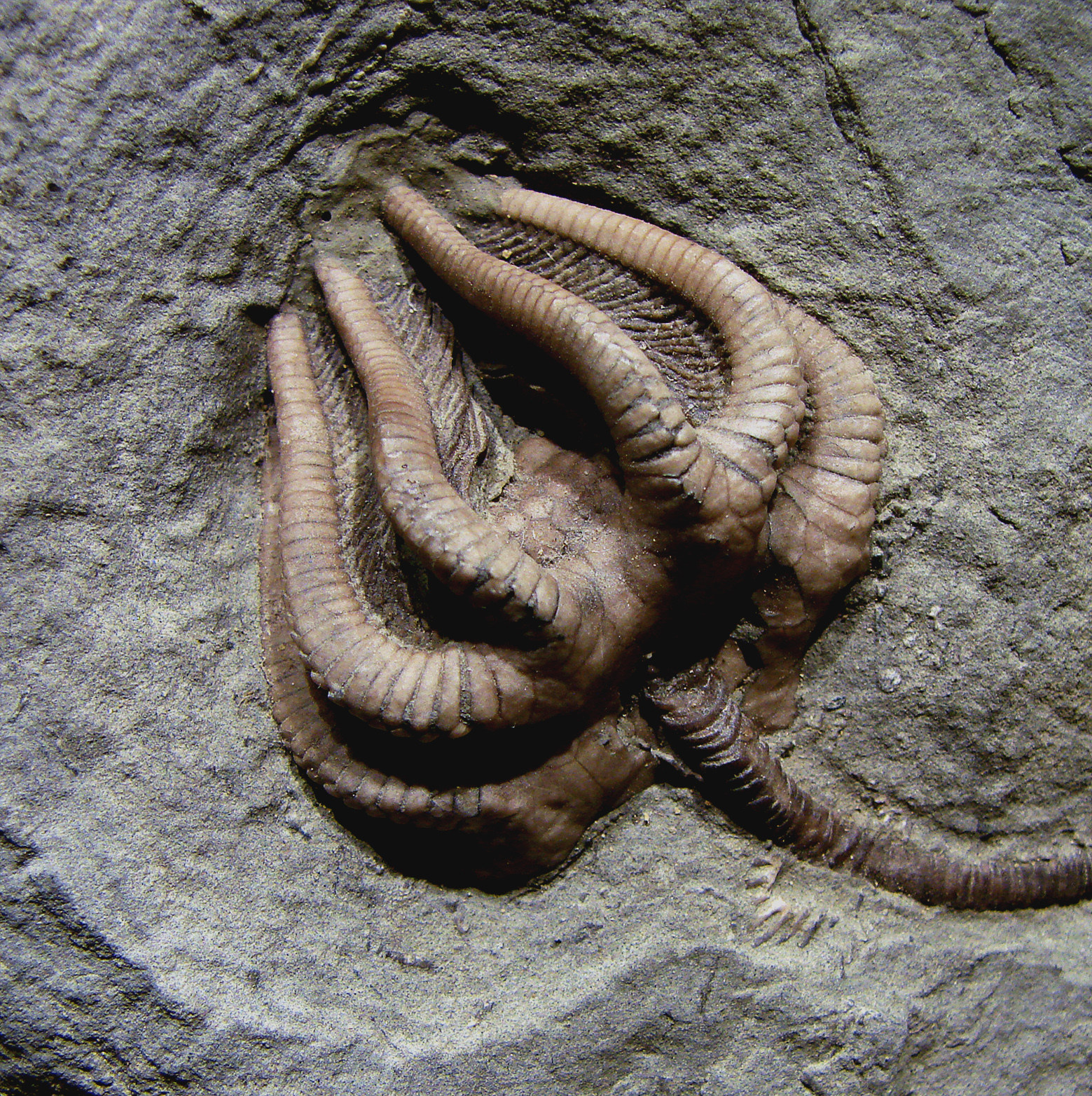
  - Fossilized calyx of the Carboniferous crinoid ("sea lily") Agaricocrinus americanus, or the mushroom crinoid
    †Agaricocrinus americanus
- †Amplexopora
- †Amplexus
- †Ampyx
- †Aphetoceras
- †Atrypa
  - †Atrypa reticularis – report made of unidentified related form or using admittedly obsolete nomenclature
- †Aulopora
- †Bellerophon
- †Bembexia
- †Bimuria
- †Bumastus
- †Calymene
  - †Calymene niagarensis
- †Calyptaulax
- †Camarotoechia
- †Cartersoceras – type locality for genus
- †Ceratopsis
- †Ceraurinus
- †Ceraurus
- †Chasmatopora
- †Cheirurus
- †Chonetes
  - †Chonetes glenparkensis – or unidentified related form
- †Christiania
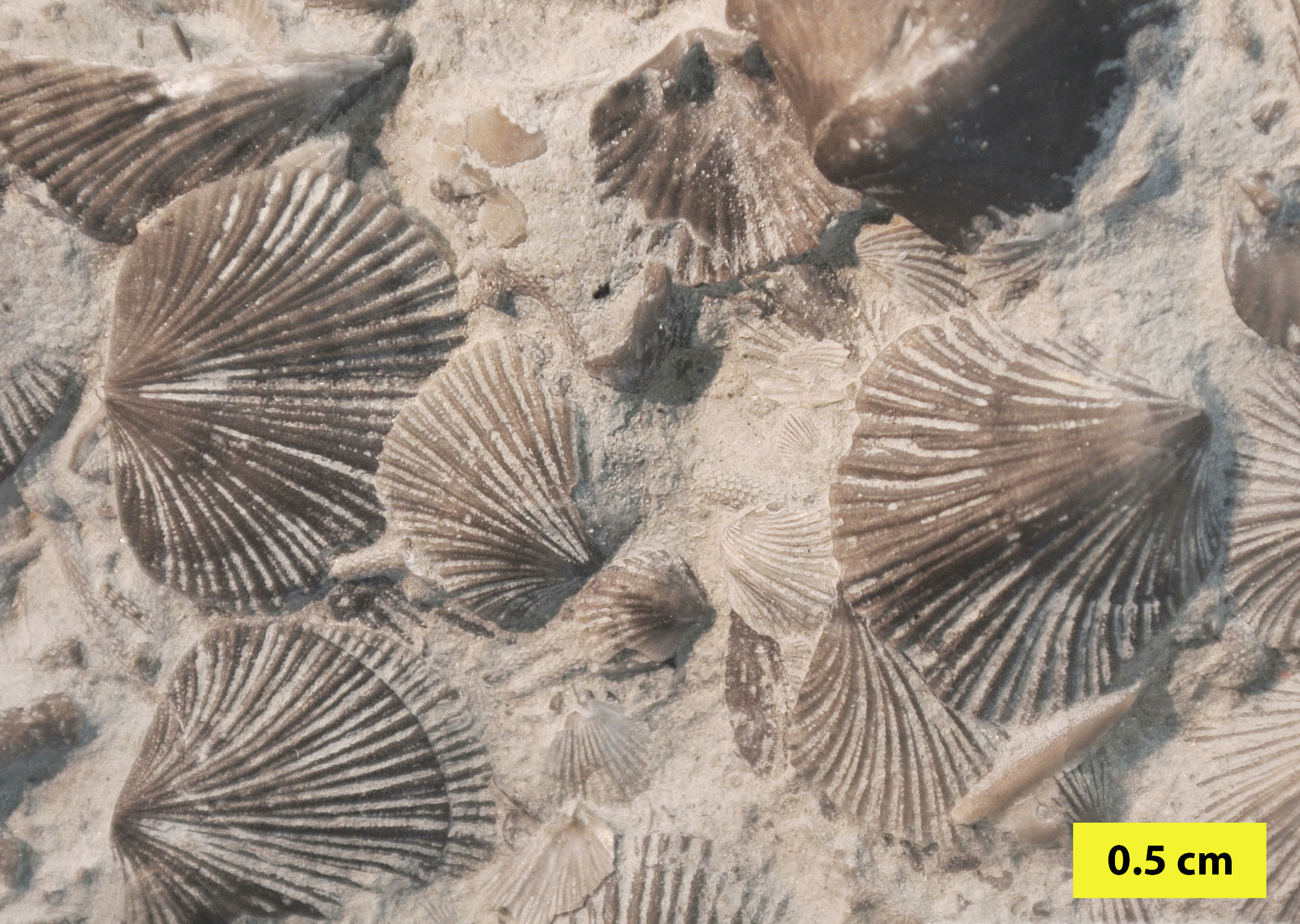
- Assemblage of fossilized shells of the Ordovician brachiopod Cincinnetina
  †Cincinnetina
  - †Cincinnetina meeki
- †Cladochonus
  - †Cladochonus crassus
- †Cleiothyridina
- †Columnaria
  - †Columnaria alveolata
- †Conocardium
- †Constellaria
- †Coolinia
- †Cornulites
  - †Cornulites proprius
- Costellirostra
  - Costellirostra Tennesseensis
- Crania
- †Craniops
- †Crepicephalus
- †Crepipora
- †Cruziana
- †Ctenostoma
- †Cyathocrinites
- †Cyclonema
- †Cyphaspis
- †Cypricardinia
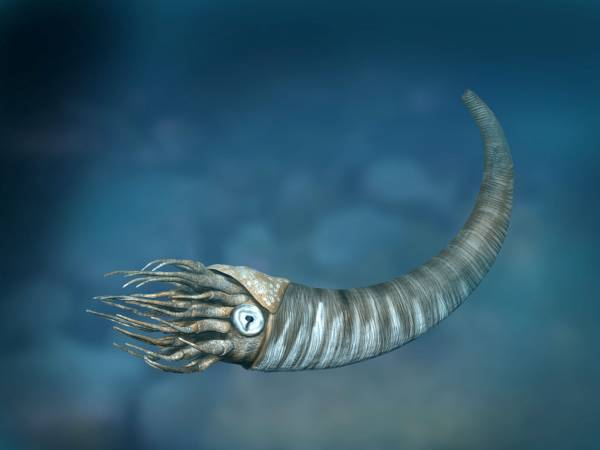
- Restoration of the Cambrian-Middle Devonian nautiloid cephalopod Cyrtoceras
  †Cyrtoceras
- †Cyrtolites
- †Cystodictya
- †Dalmanites
- †Dicoelosia
- †Dimerocrinites
  - †Dimerocrinites carleyi
  - †Dimerocrinites inornatus
  - †Dimerocrinites occidentalis
- †Distomodus
  - †Distomodus staurognathoides
- Dunkleosteus
- †Eatonia
- †Echinosphaerites
- †Eospirifer
  - †Eospirifer radiatus
- †Eretmocrinus
  - †Eretmocrinus magnificus
- '
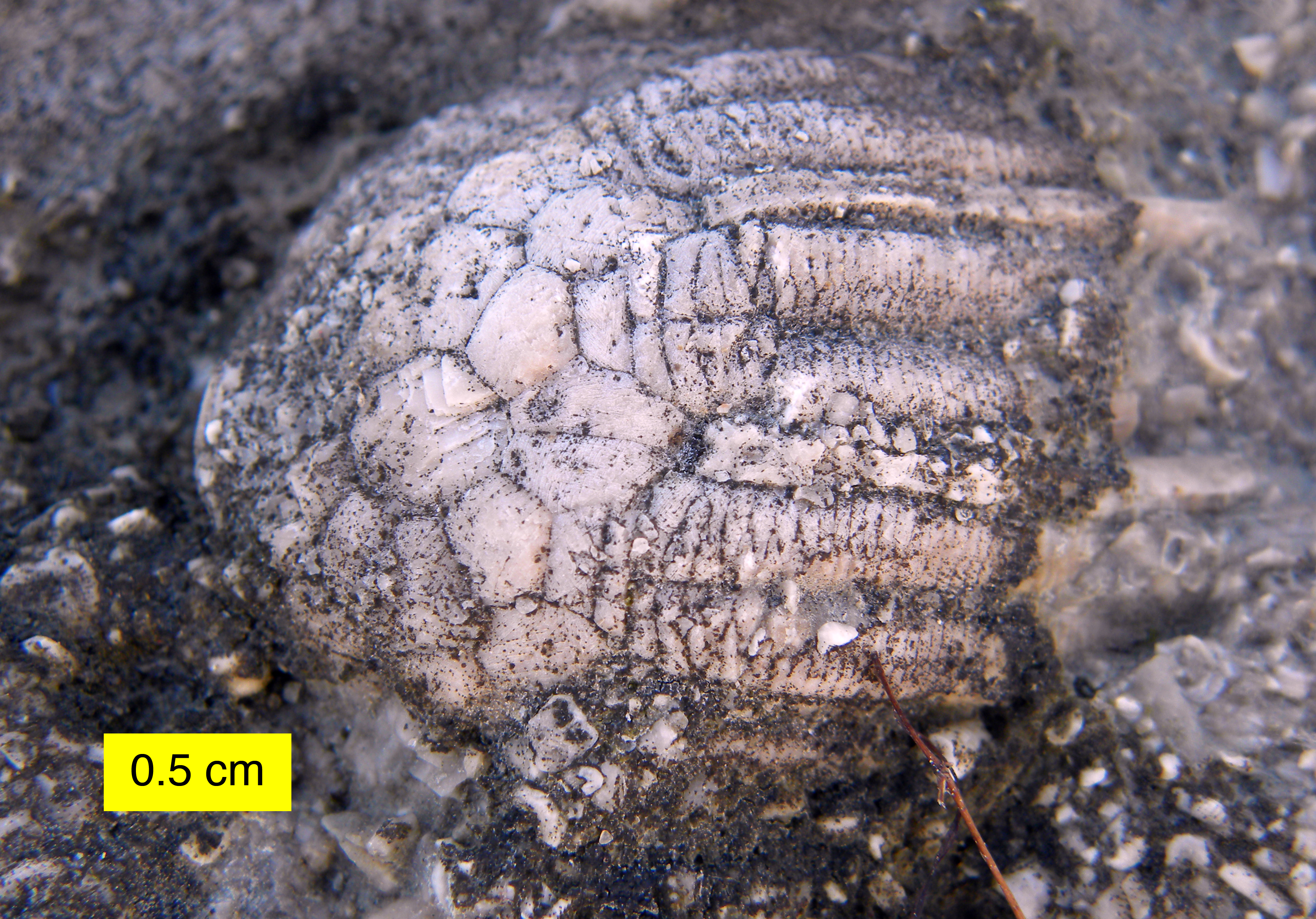
  Fossilized calyx of the Silurian-Middle Devonian crinoid ("sea lily") Eucalyptocrinites
  †Eucalyptocrinites
  - †Eucalyptocrinites caelatus
  - †Eucalyptocrinites crassus
- †Favositella
- †Favosites
  - †Favosites forbesi
  - †Favosites spinigerus
- †Fenestella
- †Fletcheria
- †Flexicalymene
  - †Flexicalymene meeki
  - †Flexicalymene senaria
- †Foerstia
- †Forbesiocrinus
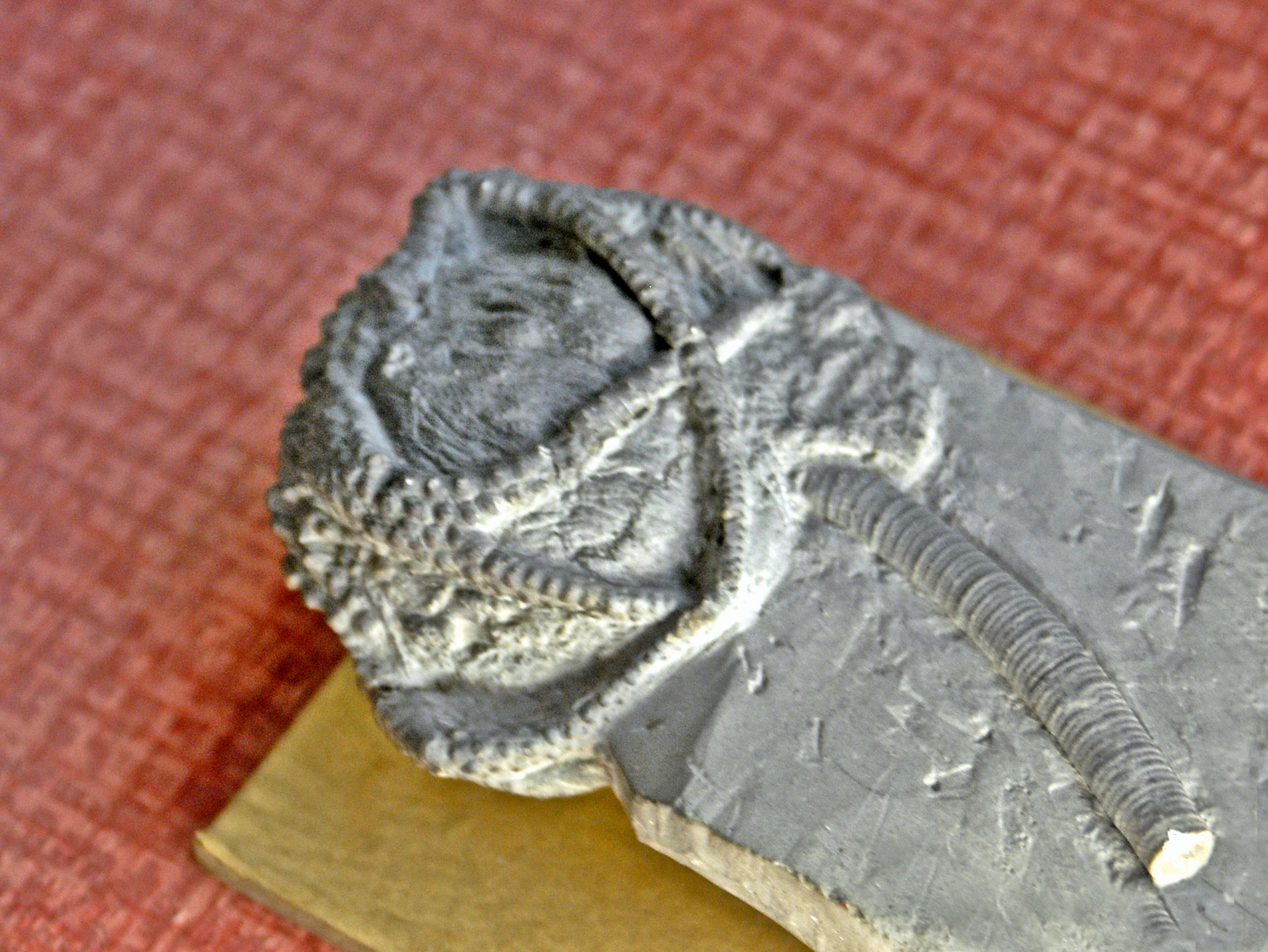
- Fossilized calyx and partial stem of the Devonian-Carboniferous crinoid ("sea lily") Gilbertsocrinus
  †Gilbertsocrinus
- †Girvanella
- †Glyptocrinus
- †Gonioceras
- †Gravicalymene
- †Grewingkia
  - †Grewingkia canadensis
- †Hallopora
- †Hedstroemia
- †Helcionopsis
  - †Helcionopsis striata
- †Hibbertia
- †Hindia
- †Holopea
- †Hyolithes
- †Illaenus
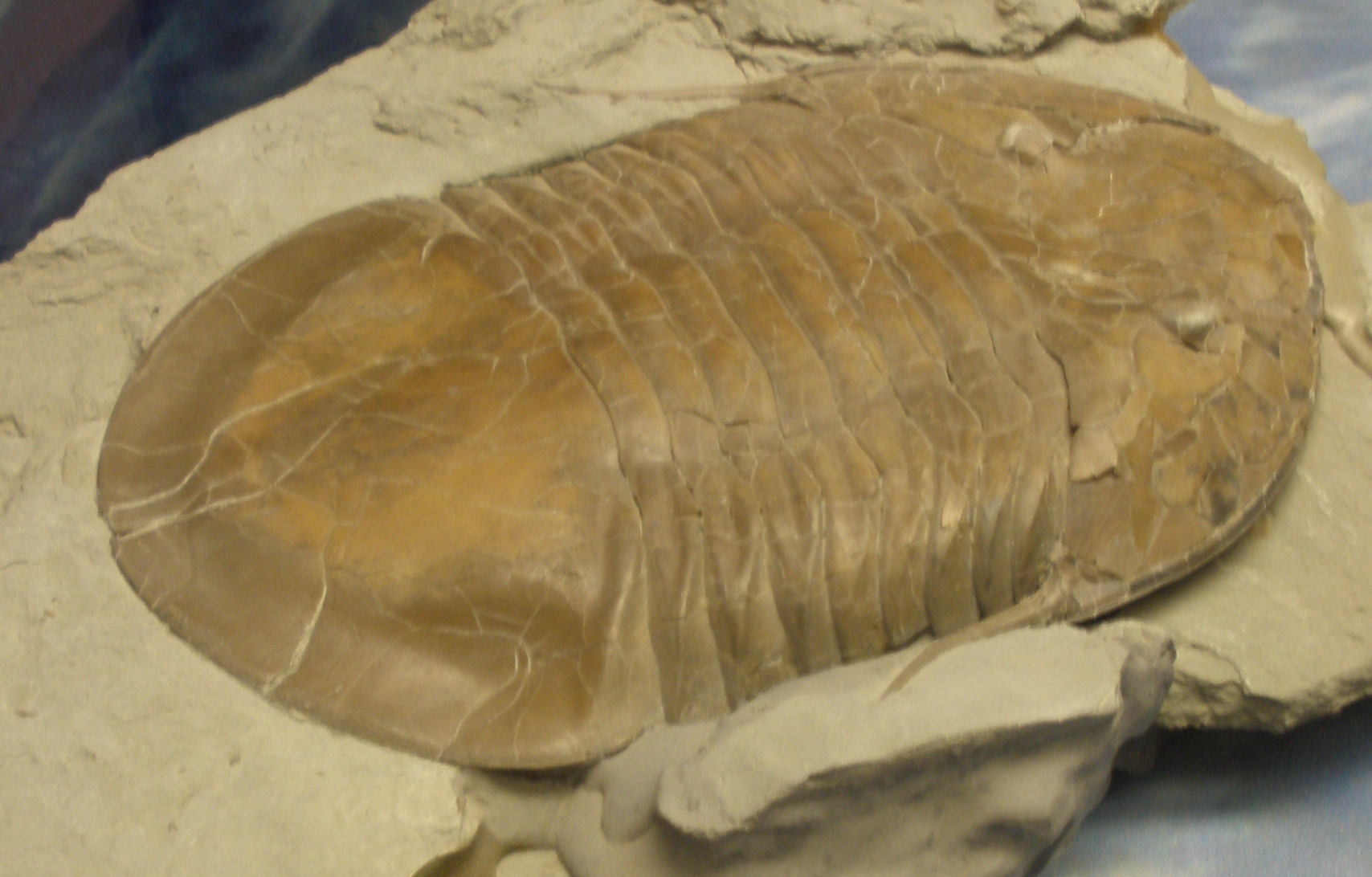
- Fossil of the Middle-Late Ordovician giant trilobite Isotelus.
  †Isotelus
- †Kockelella
- †Krausella
- †Lingulella
- †Lonchodomas
- †Marsupiocrinus
- †Meristella
- †Meristina
- †Monomorphichnus
- †Orthoceras
- †Ozarkodina
  - †Ozarkodina confluens
- †Paciphacops
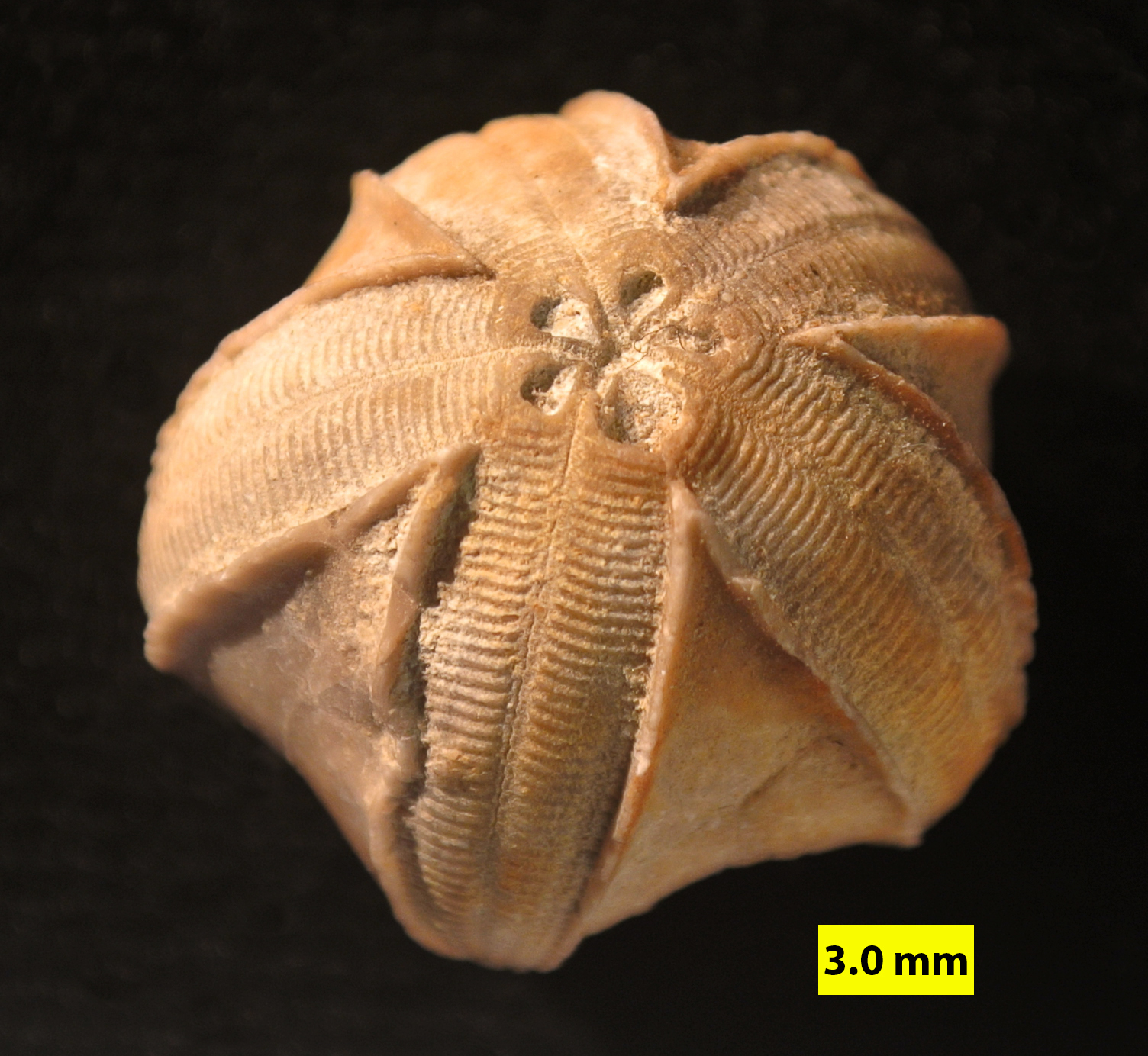
- Fossilized theca of the Carboniferous blastoid echinoderm ("sea bud") Pentremites
  †Pentremites
- †Phragmolites
- †Phycodes
- †Phylloporina
- †Plaesiomys
- †Planolites
- †Platyceras – type locality for genus
- †Platycrinites
- †Platystrophia
  - †Platystrophia acutilirata
  - †Platystrophia cypha
- †Plectoceras
- †Pleurodictyum
- †Plumulites
- †Proetus
- †Protosalvinia
- †Pterotheca
- †Quadratia
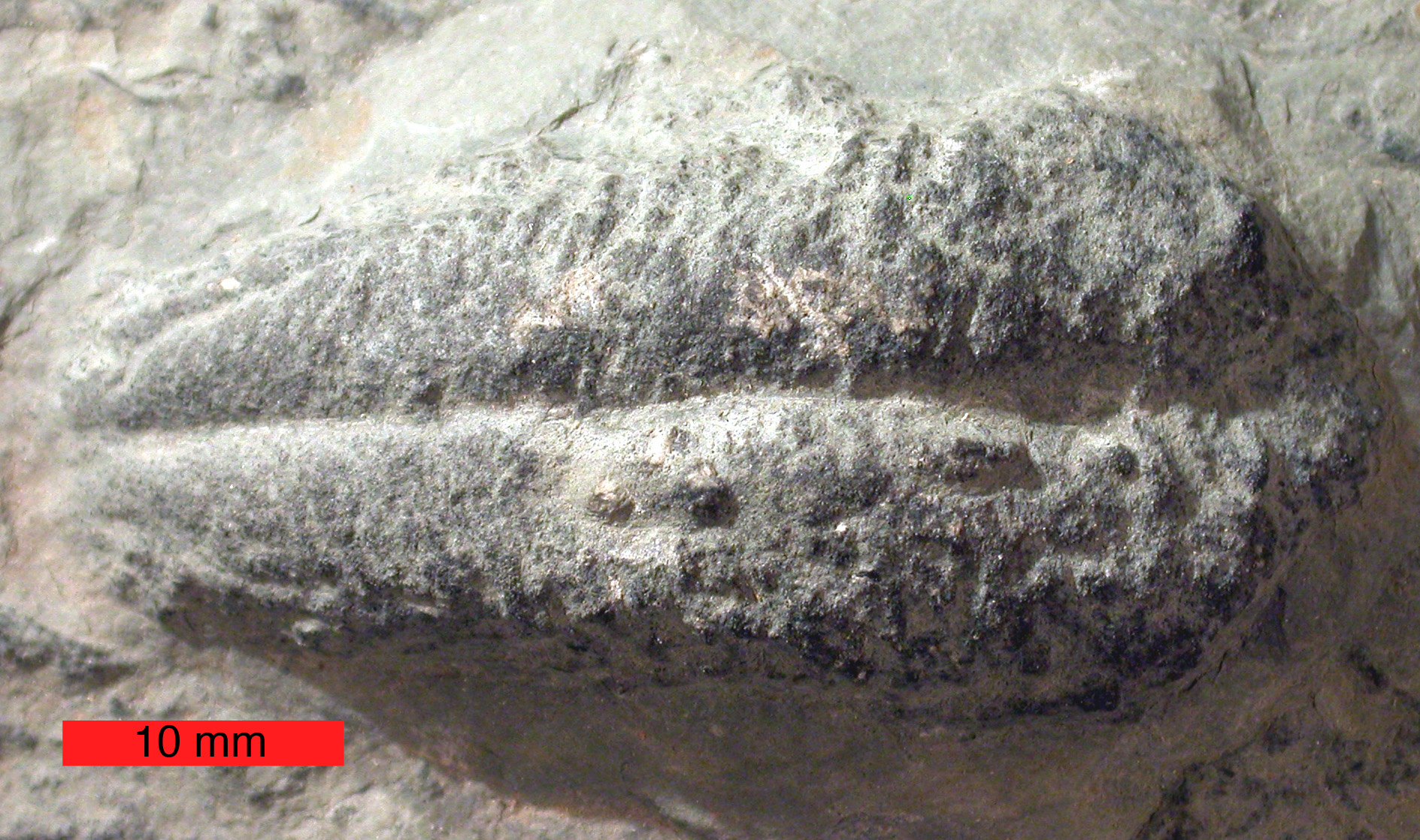
- Fossil of the arthropod burrow ichnogenus Rusophycus
  †Rusophycus
- †Sagenocrinites
- †Salterella
- †Siphonotreta
- †Skenidioides
- †Skolithos
- †Solenopora
  - †Solenopora compacta
- †Sowerbyella
- †Sphaerocodium – tentative report
- †Spirifer
- Spirorbis
- †Spyroceras
- †Stigmatella
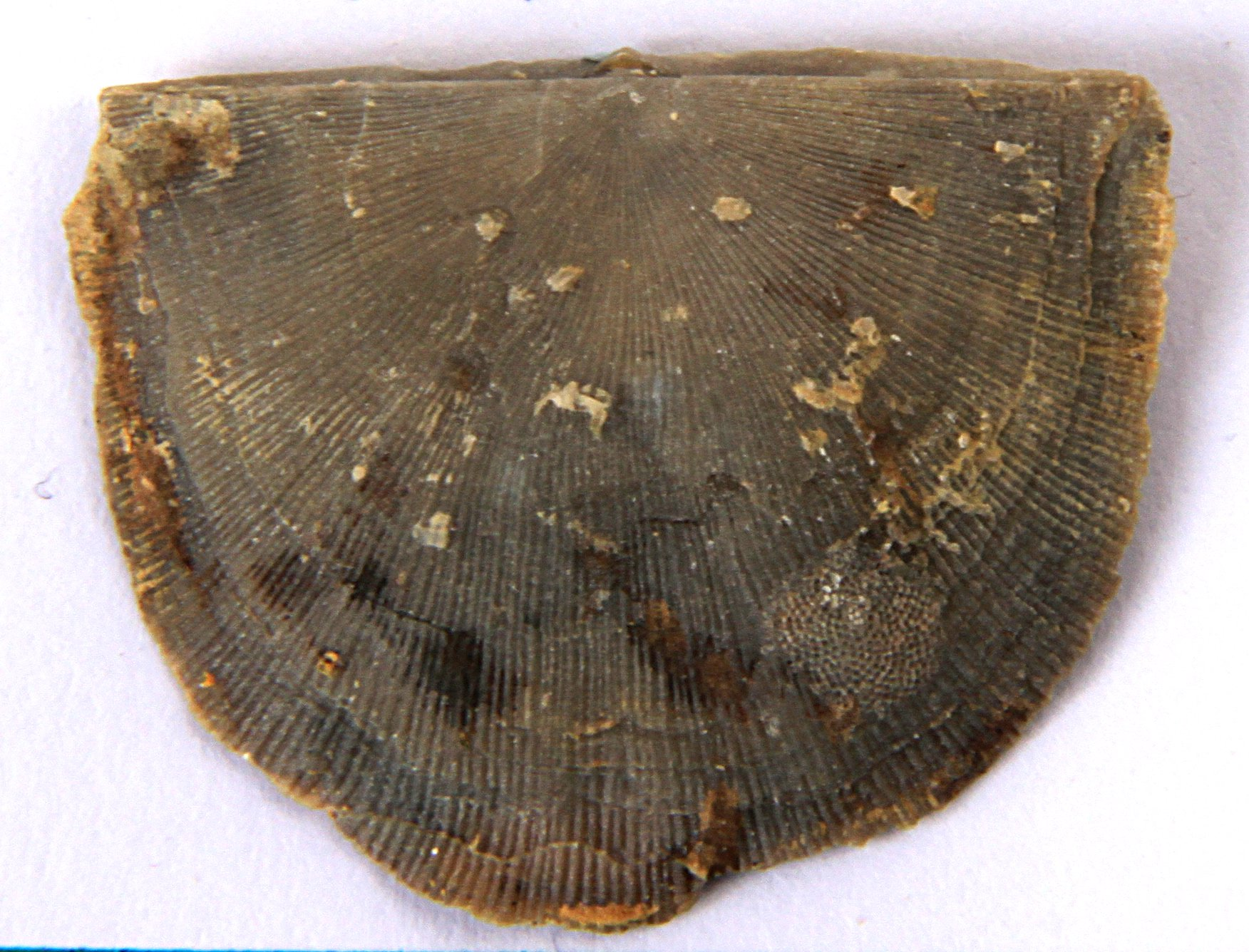
- Fossilized shell of the Ordovician-Silurian brachiopod Strophomena
  †Strophomena
  - †Strophomena concordensis
  - †Strophomena filitexta
  - †Strophomena incurvata
  - †Strophomena neglecta
  - †Strophomena planumbona
- †Subulites
- †Taxocrinus
- †Tentaculites
- †Tetradium
- †Tricrepicephalus
- †Trimerus
- †Westonia
- †Whiteavesia
- †Wurmiella
  - †Wurmiella excavata

== Mesozoic ==
=== Selected Mesozoic taxa of Tennessee ===
- Acirsa
- Acmaea
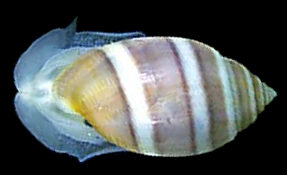
- A living Acteon barrel bubble sea snail
  †Acteon
- †Aenona
- Amauropsis
- †Ampullina
- †Ancilla
- †Anomia
- †Anomoeodus
- †Arca
- Arctica
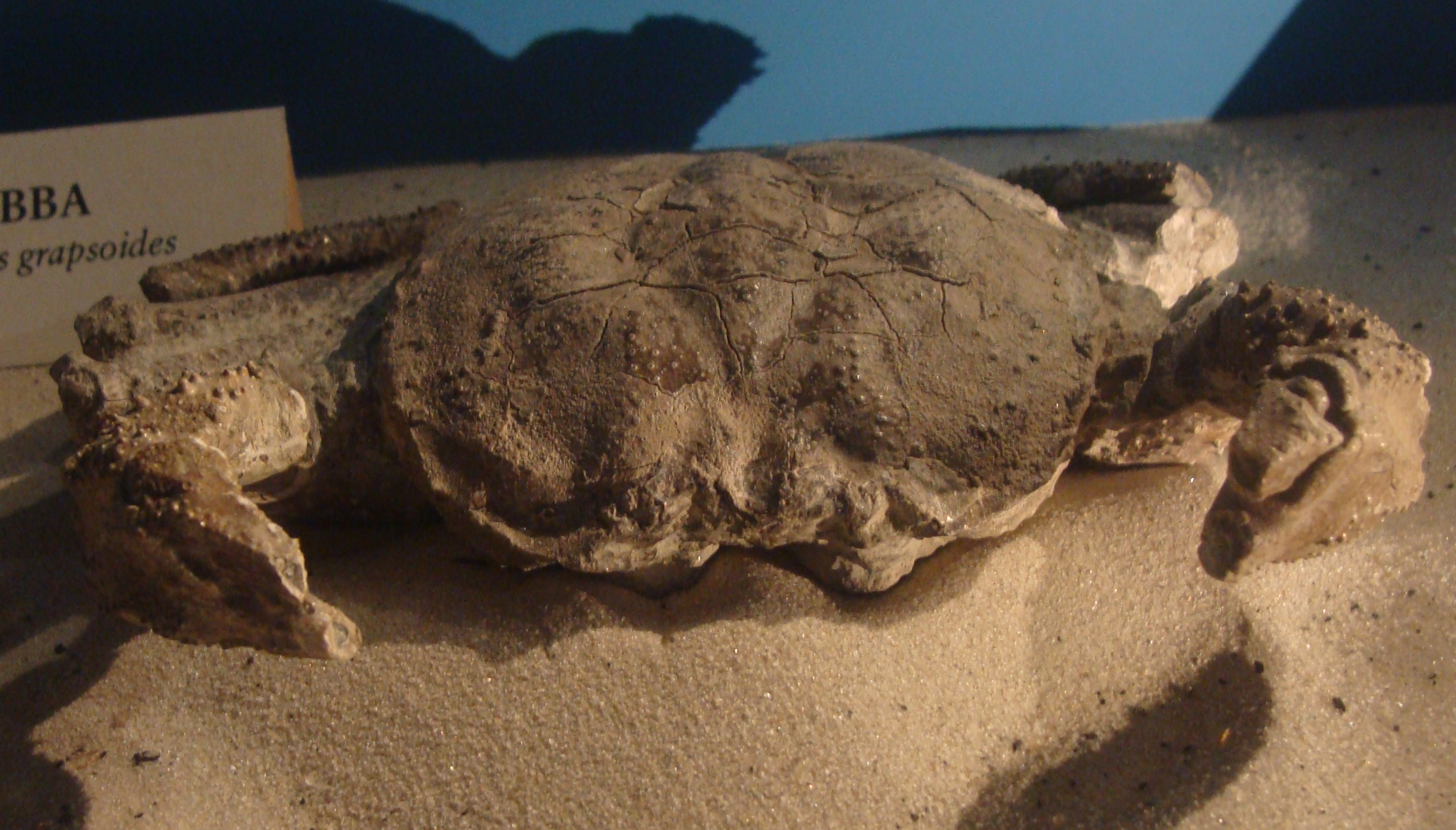
- Fossil of the Late Cretaceous crab Avitelmessus
  †Avitelmessus
  - †Avitelmessus grapsoideus
- †Baculites
  - †Baculites grandis
  - †Baculites ovatus
- Barbatia
- Brachidontes
- Cadulus
- Caestocorbula
  - †Caestocorbula crassiplica
- Callianassa
  - †Callianassa mortoni
- †Calliomphalus
  - †Calliomphalus americanus – type locality for species
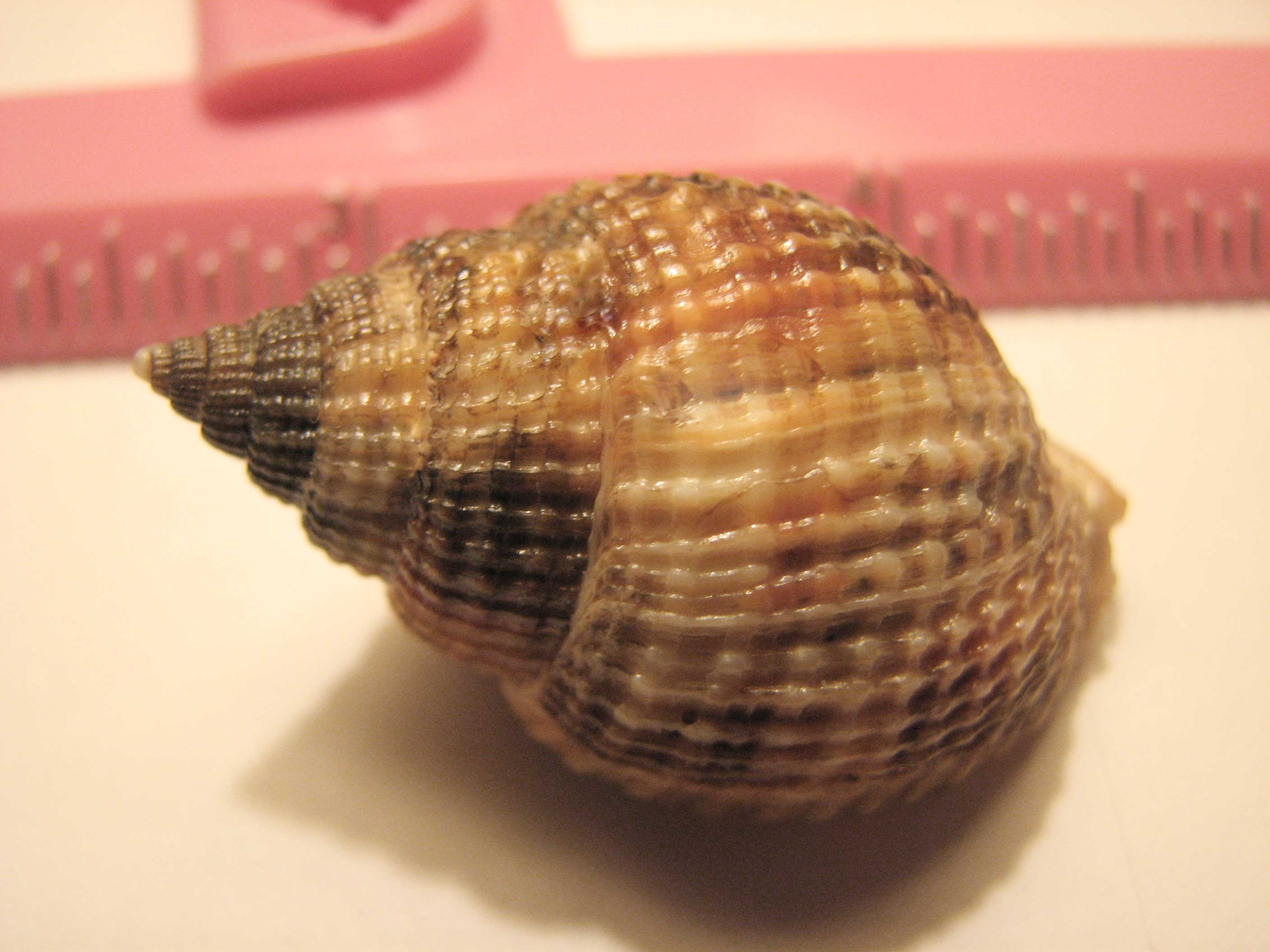
- Shell of a Cancellaria nutmeg sea snail
  Cancellaria
- Capulus
- †Caveola
- Cerithiopsis
- Cerithium
- Charonia
- Chiton
- Clavagella
- Cliona
- †Conorbis
- Corbula
- †Crania – tentative report
- †Crenella
  - †Crenella elegantula
  - †Crenella serica
- Cucullaea
  - †Cucullaea capax
  - †Cucullaea littlei
- Cylichna
  - †Cylichna incisa
- †Dentalium
- †Discoscaphites
  - †Discoscaphites iris
- †Dolicholatirus
- †Ecphora
- Edmontosaurus
  - Edmontosaurus regalis - report made of unidentified related form
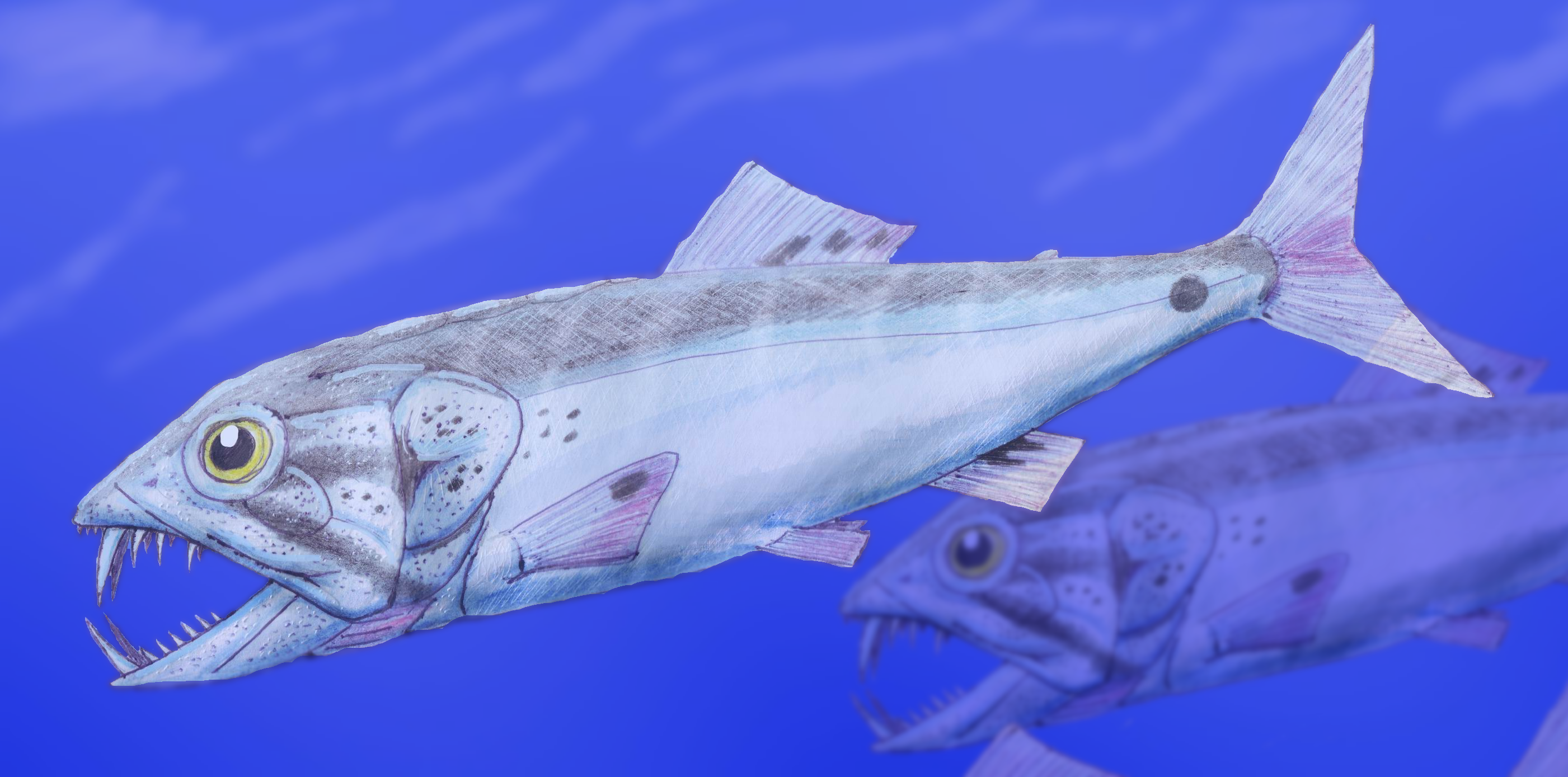
- Restoration of the Early Cretaceous-Eocene bony fish Enchodus, or the "saber-toothed herring"
  †Enchodus
- †Eothoracosaurus
  - †Eothoracosaurus mississippiensis
- †Eulima
- †Euspira
- †Eutrephoceras
- †Exilia
- †Exogyra
  - †Exogyra cancellata
  - †Exogyra costata
- Fasciolaria – tentative report
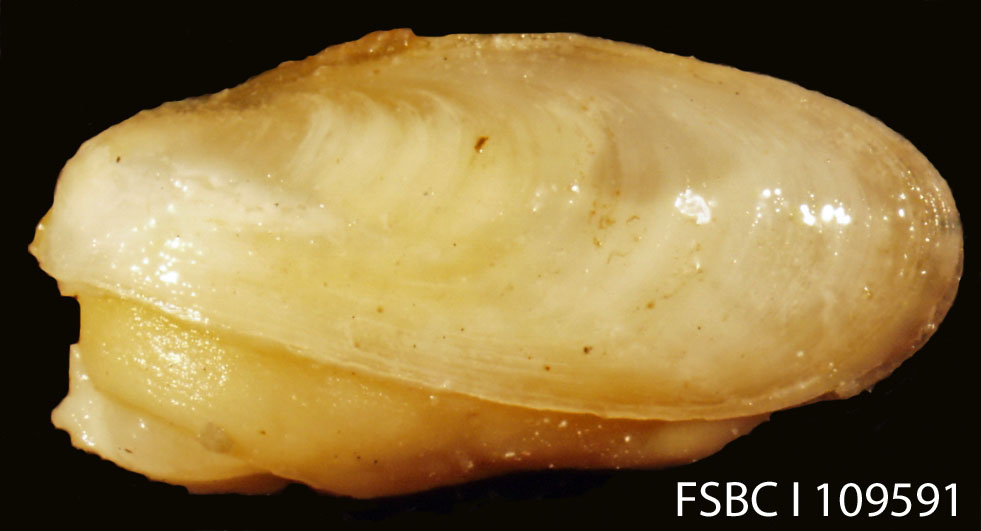
- A Gastrochaena marine bivalve
  Gastrochaena
- †Gegania
- Gemmula
- Glossus
- Glycymeris
- †Hamulus
- †Helicoceras
  - †Helicoceras navarroense
- †Hoploparia
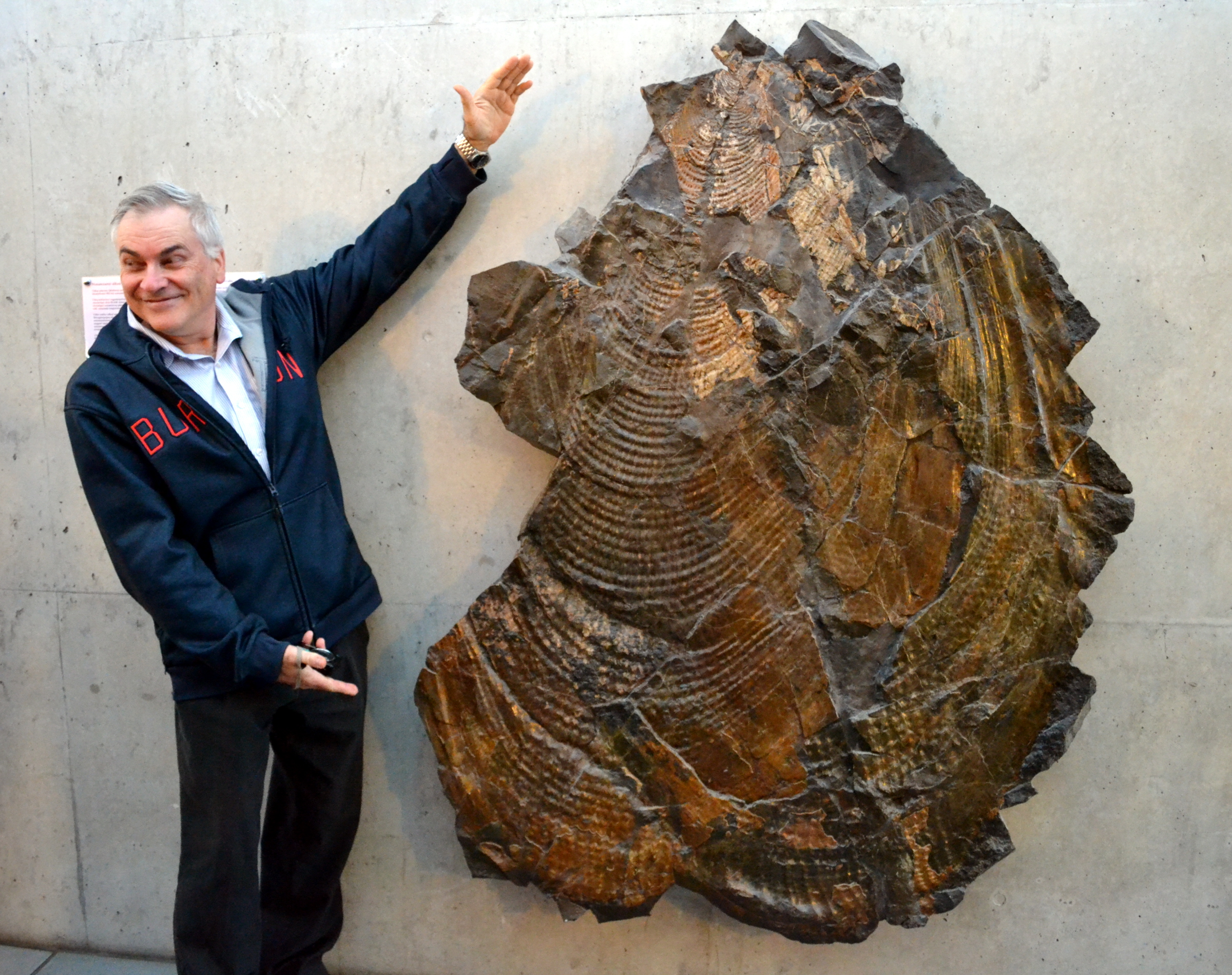
- Fossilized shell of the Early Jurassic-Late Cretaceous marine bivalve Inoceramus with a human indicating its size
  †Inoceramus
  - †Inoceramus proximus
  - †Inoceramus sagensis
- †Ischyrhiza
  - †Ischyrhiza mira
- Latiaxis
- Limatula
- †Linearis
- Lithophaga
- Littorina
- Lopha
  - †Lopha falcata
- †Lucina
- †Mammila
- Martesia
- †Mathilda
- Melanatria
- Membranipora
- Meretrix
- †Metopaster
- Micropora
- †Morea
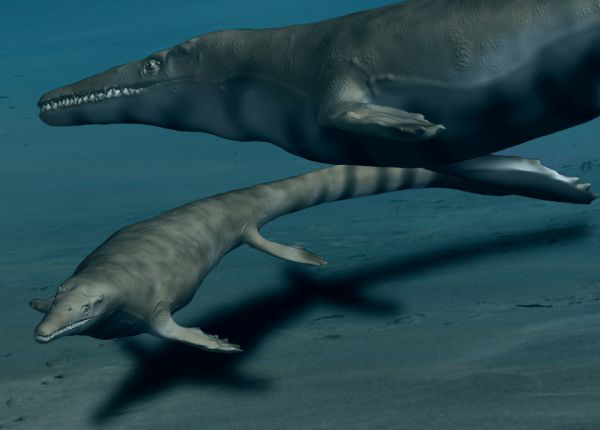
- Life restoration of two of the Late Cretaceous Mosasaurus
  †Mosasaurus
- †Neithea
  - †Neithea quinquecostata
- Nucula
  - †Nucula percrassa
- †Obeliscus
- †Odostomia
  - †Odostomia plicata – type locality for species
- Opalia
- Ostrea
- Panopea
- † Paranomia
- †Pecten
- †Pedalion
- †Peneus
- Pholadomya
  - †Pholadomya occidentalis
- †Plioplatecarpus
  - †Plioplatecarpus depressus
- Polinices
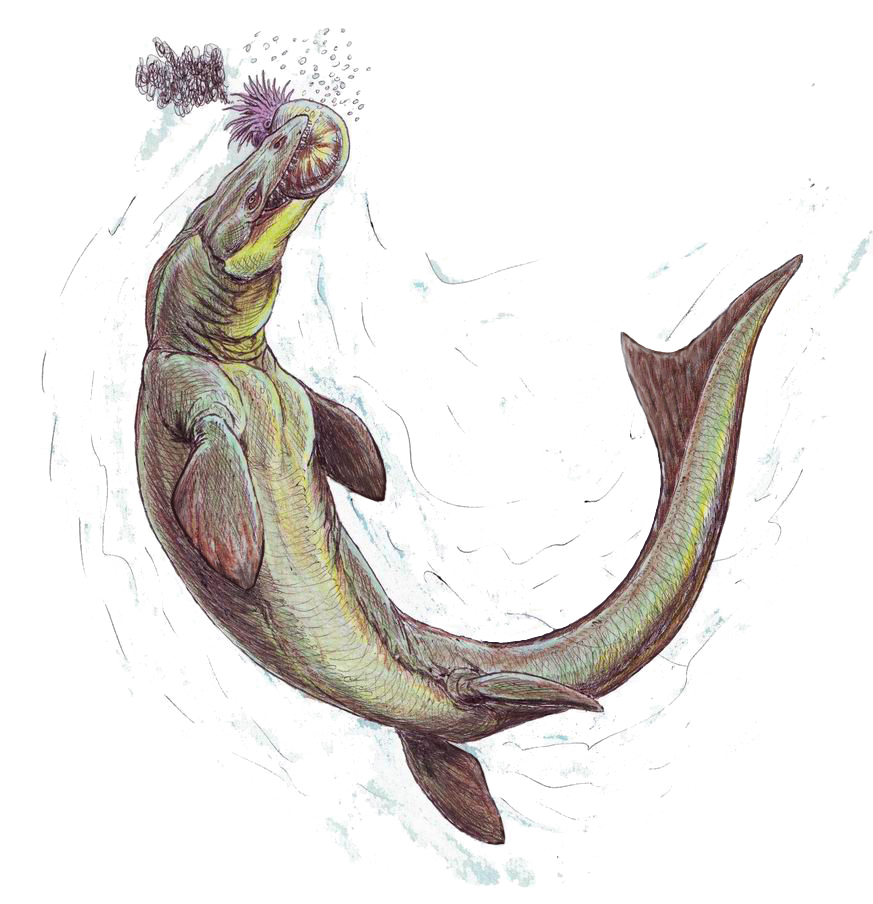
- Life restoration of the Late Cretaceous mosasaur Prognathodon preying upon an ammonoid cephalopod
  †Prognathodon
- †Protocardia
- †Pteria
- †Pterotrigonia
  - †Pterotrigonia angulicostata
  - †Pterotrigonia thoracica
- Pycnodonte
- Ringicula
  - †Ringicula pulchella
- Rissoina
- Rostellaria – tentative report
- †Sargana
- †Saurodon – tentative report
- † Scala
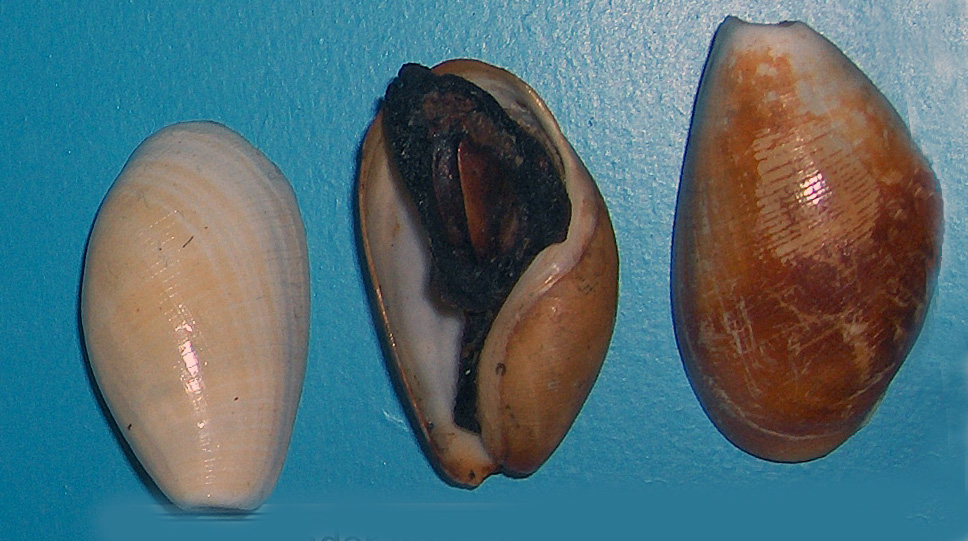
- Shells in multiple views of a Scaphander canoe bubble sea snail
  Scaphander
- †Scaphites
- †Schizobasis
- Seila
- †Seminola
- Serpula
- Serpulorbis
- †Siphonaria
- Teinostoma
- Tellina
- †Tenea
- †Teredo
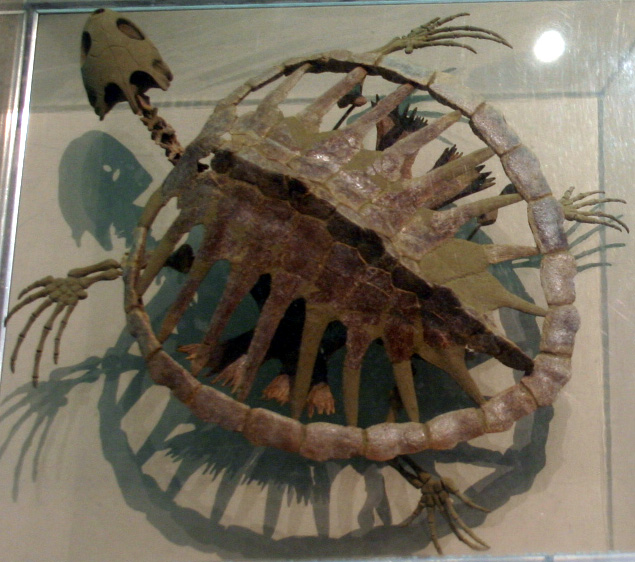
- Mounted fossilized skeleton of the Late Cretaceous sea turtle Toxochelys
  †Toxochelys
  - †Toxochelys latiremis
- Trichotropis
- †Trigonia
- Trochus
- †Tuba
- Turbinella
- †Turricula
- Turris
- Turritella
  - †Turritella bilira
  - †Turritella paravertebroides
  - †Turritella tippana
  - †Turritella trilira
  - †Turritella vertebroides
- Yoldia

== Cenozoic ==
- Aegolius
  - †Aegolius acadicus
  - †Aegolius funereus
- Alligator
- Alnus
- †Ambystoma
- †Androglandula – type locality for genus
  - †Androglandula tennessensis – type locality for species
- †Arctomeles
  - †Arctomeles dimolodontus – type locality for species
- Athleta
  - †Athleta rugatus
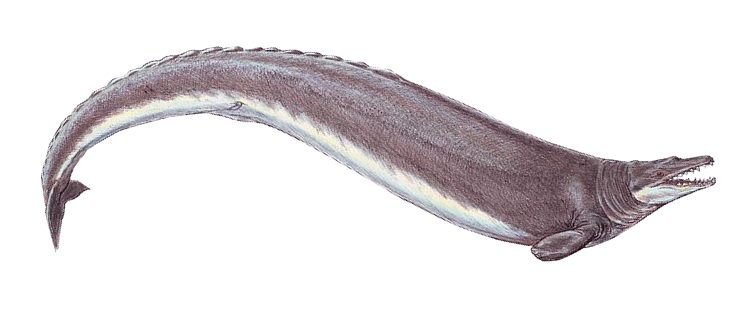
- Life restoration of the Eocene whale Basilosaurus
  †Basilosaurus
  - †Basilosaurus cetoides – or unidentified comparable form
- †Berhamniphyllum – type locality for genus
  - †Berhamniphyllum claibornense – type locality for species
- Betula
- †Blattotermes
  - †Blattotermes wheeleri – type locality for species
- Bonasa
  - †Bonasa umbellus
- Brachidontes – or unidentified comparable form
  - †Brachidontes saffordi
- †Caesalpinia
  - †Caesalpinia claibornensis – type locality for species
- Canis
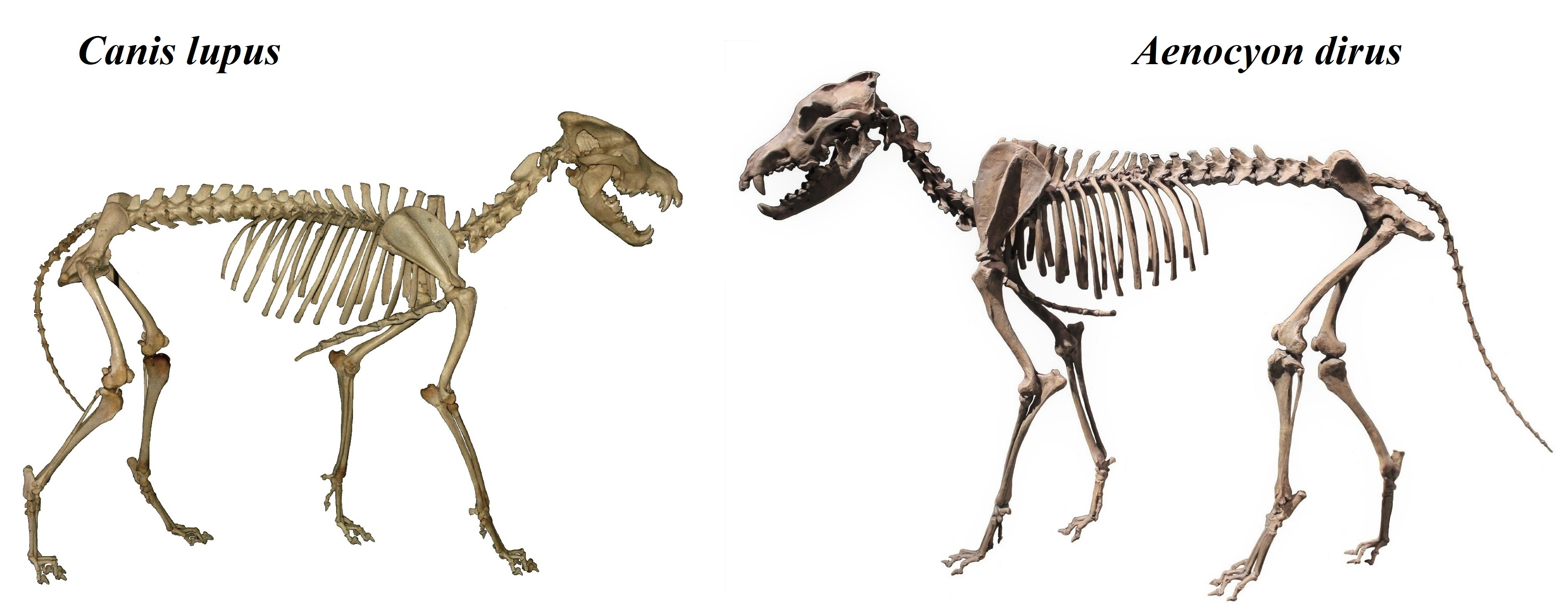
  - Modern mounted skeleton of Canis lupus, the grey wolf, to scale with a fossilized skeleton of the Pleistocene wolf Canis dirus, or dire wolf
    †Canis dirus – tentative report
- Capella
  - †Capella gallinago
- Carduelis
  - †Carduelis pinus
- Carpodacus
  - †Carpodacus purpureus
- Carya
- †Castaneoidea – type locality for genus
  - †Castaneoidea puryearensis – type locality for species
- †Castanopsoidea – type locality for genus
  - †Castanopsoidea columbiana – type locality for species
- Castor
  - †Castor canadensis
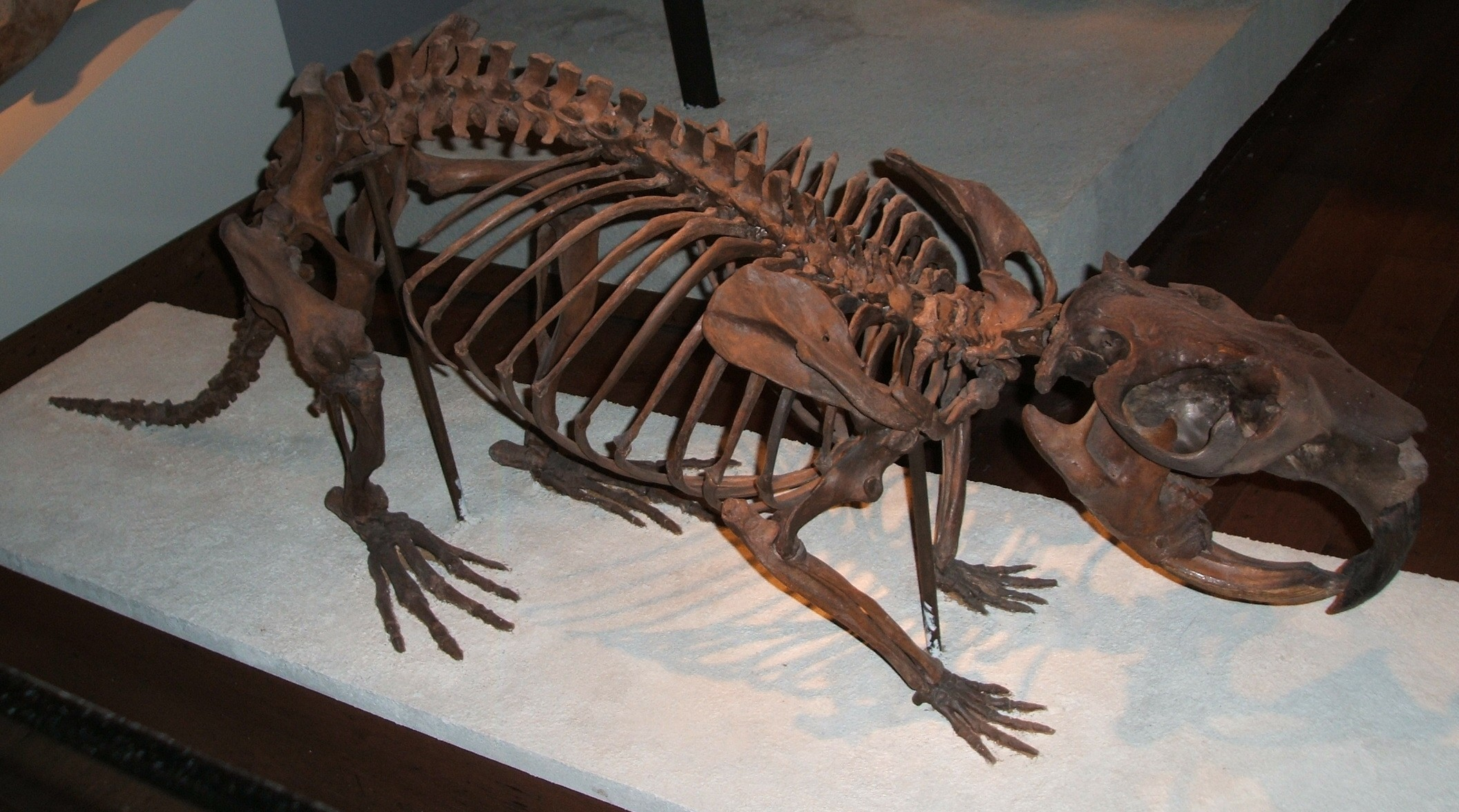
- Mounted fossilized skeleton of the Pliocene-Pleistocene giant beaver Castoroides
  †Castoroides
- Celtis
- Cervus
  - †Cervus elaphus
- Chaetura
  - †Chaetura pelagica
- Chrysemys
- Clethrionomys
  - †Clethrionomys gapperi
- Colaptes
  - †Colaptes auratus
- Coluber
- Corbula
  - †Corbula subcompressa
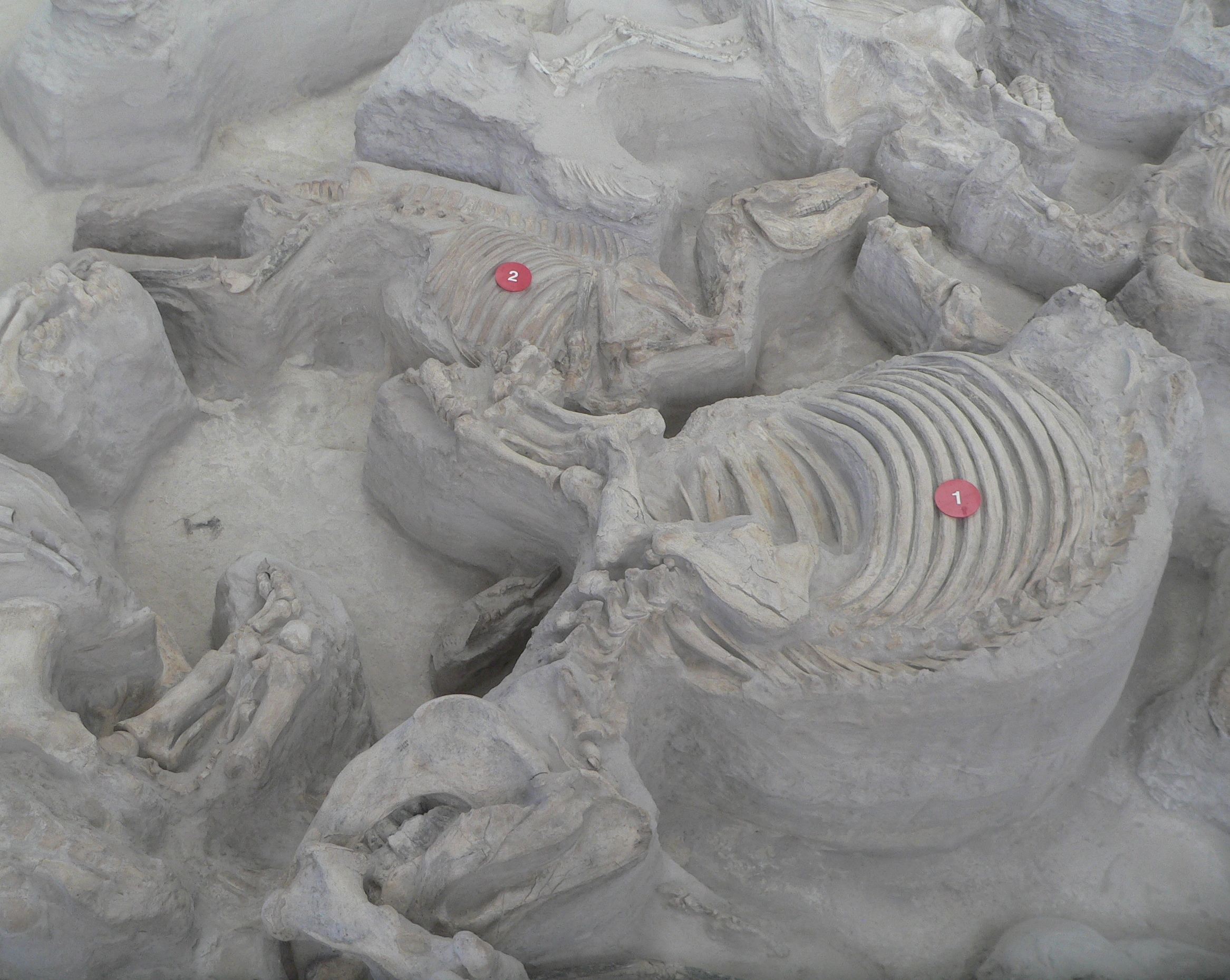
- Fossilized skeleton preserved in situ (upper left, 2) of the Miocene-Pliocene horse Cormohipparion
  †Cormohipparion – or unidentified comparable form
- Coturnicops
  - †Coturnicops noveboracensis
- Crassatella
  - †Crassatella gabbi
- Crotalus
- Cucullaea
  - †Cucullaea saffordi
- Cyanocitta
  - †Cyanocitta cristata
- Desmognathus
- Didelphis
  - †Didelphis virginiana
- †Diplotropis
  - †Diplotropis claybornensis – type locality for species
- †Ectopistes
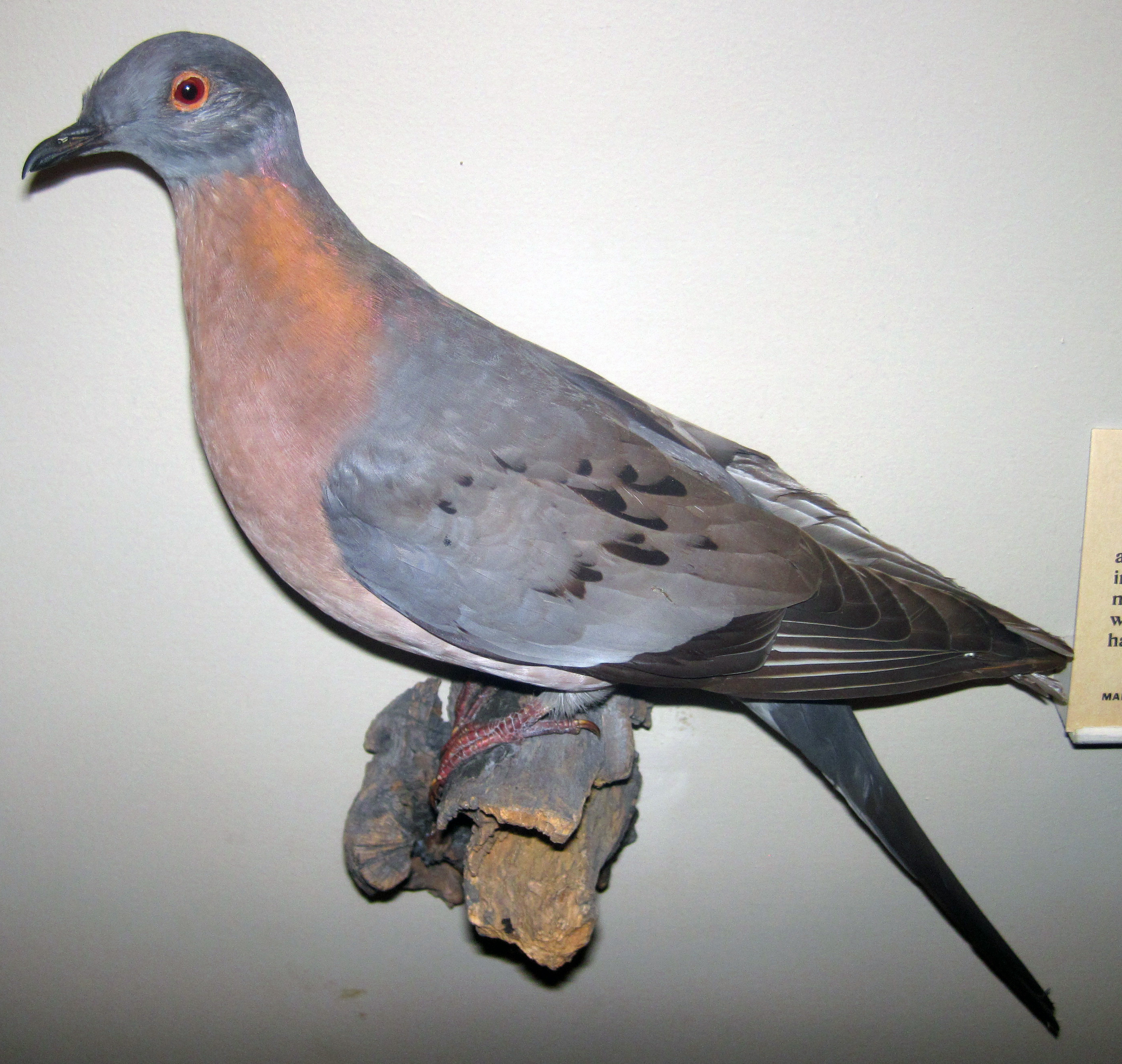
  - Taxidermied male Ectopistes migratorius, or passenger pigeon
    †Ectopistes migratorius
- †Elater
  - †Elater berryi – type locality for species
- †Eoglandulosa – type locality for genus
  - †Eoglandulosa warmanensis – type locality for species
- †Eomimosoidea – type locality for genus
  - †Eomimosoidea plumosa – type locality for species
- Eptesicus
  - †Eptesicus fuscus
- Equus
  - †Equus complicatus
  - †Equus leidyi
- Eremophila
  - †Eremophila alpestris
- Erethizon
  - †Erethizon dorsatum
- Falco
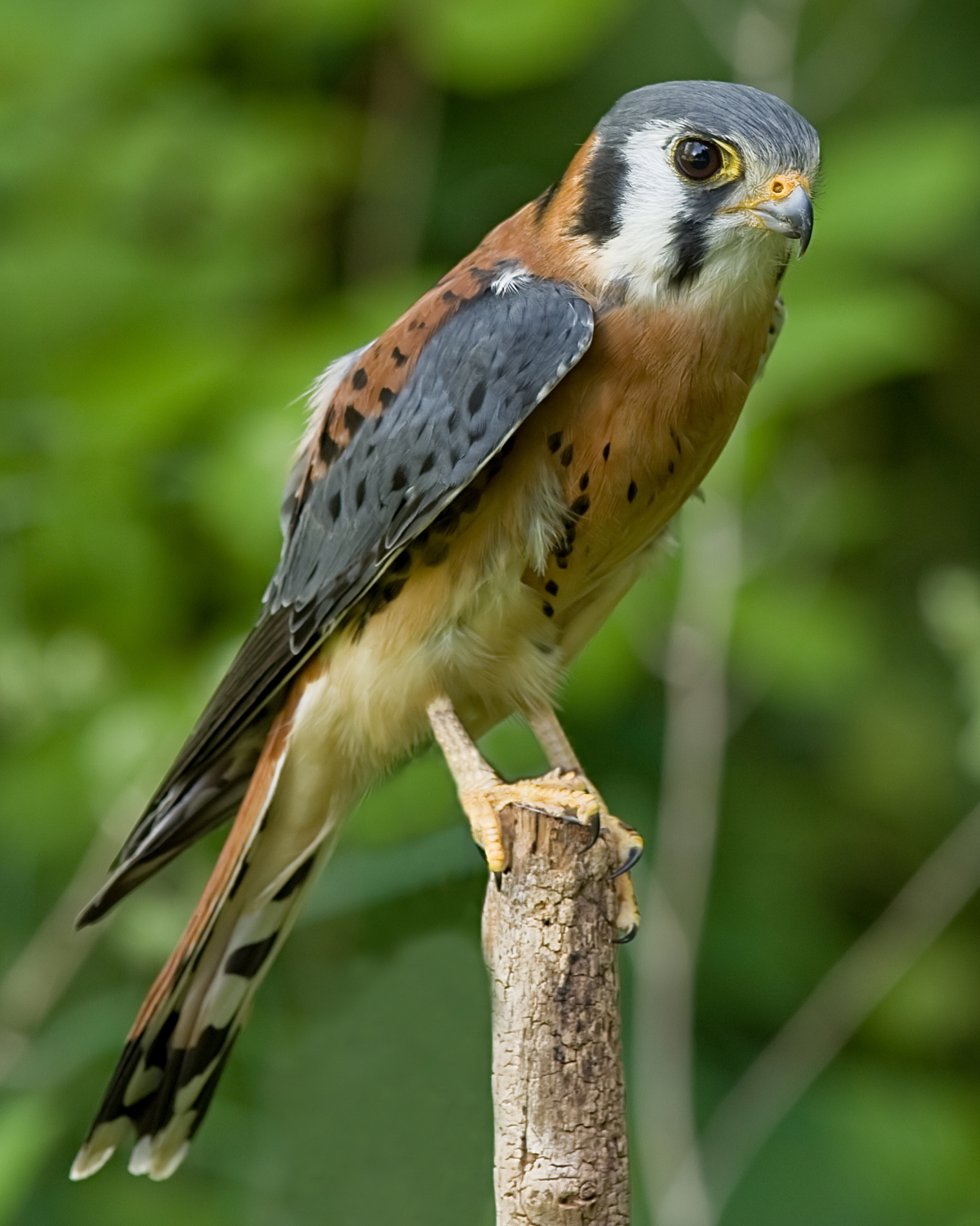
  - A living Falco sparverius, or American kestrel
    †Falco sparverius
- †Folindusia
  - †Folindusia wilcoxiana
- †Formicium – type locality for genus
  - †Formicium berryi – type locality for species
- †Fraxinus
- Geomys
- Glaucomys
  - †Glaucomys sabrinus
- Glycymeris
- Glyptemys
  - †Glyptemys insculpta
- †Hippomaneoidea – type locality for genus
  - †Hippomaneoidea warmanensis – type locality for species
- Hyla
  - †Hyla femoralis
- †Knightiophyllum
  - †Knightiophyllum wilcoxianum
- †Laevibuccinum
  - †Laevibuccinum constrictum
- Lepus
  - †Lepus americanus
- Lontra
  - †Lontra canadensis
- Lynx
  - †Lynx rufus – or unidentified comparable form
- †Machairodus – or unidentified comparable form
- †Mammut
  - †Mammut americanum
- †Mammuthus
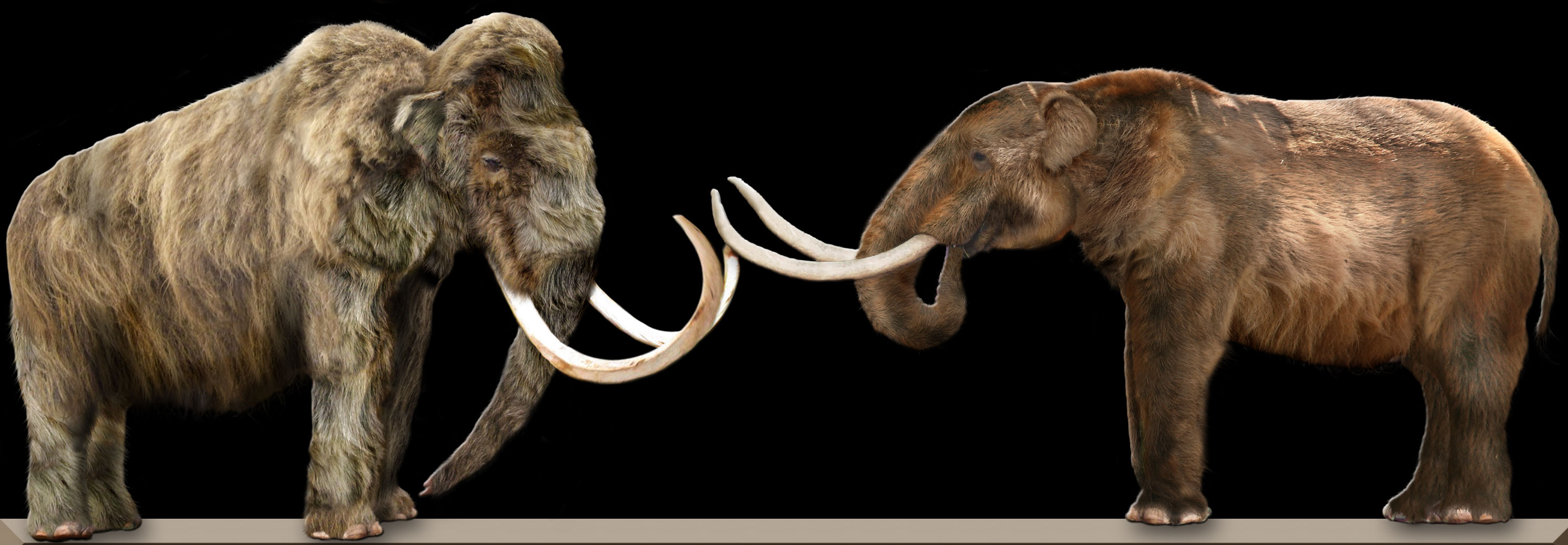
  - Life restorations of a Mammut americanum, or American mastodon (right), and a Mammuthus primigenius, or wooly mammoth (left)
    †Mammuthus primigenius
- Marmota
  - †Marmota monax
- †Mazzalina – or unidentified comparable form
  - †Mazzalina impressa
- †Megatylopus – or unidentified comparable form
- Melanerpes
  - †Melanerpes carolinus
- †Melolonthites
  - †Melolonthites collinsi – type locality for species
- Mephitis
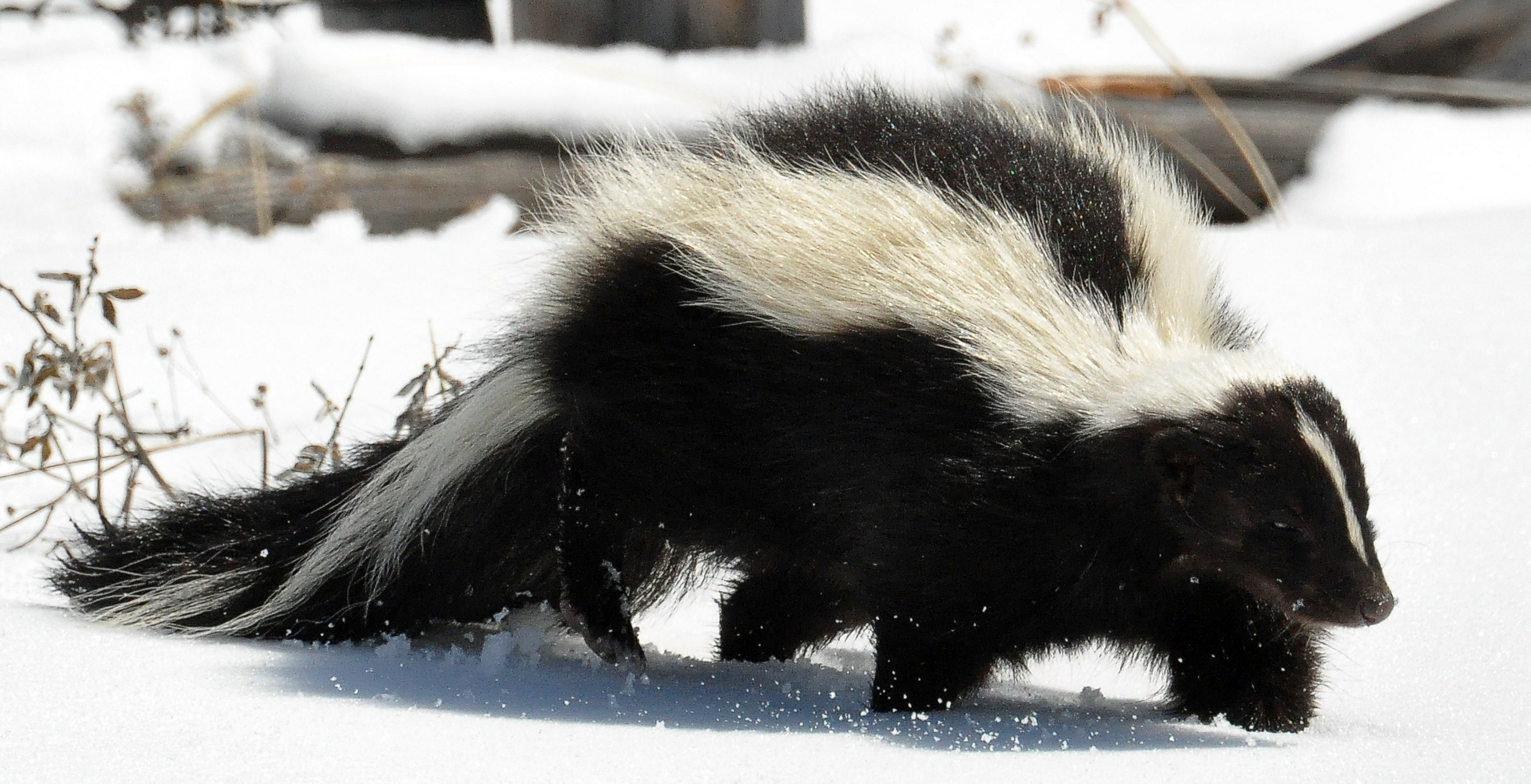
  - A living Mephitis mephitis, or striped skunk
    †Mephitis mephitis
- Mesalia
  - †Mesalia hardemanensis
  - †Mesalia pumila
- Microtus
  - †Microtus pennsylvanicus
  - †Microtus xanthognathus
- †Mylohyus
  - †Mylohyus fossilis
- Natica – report made of unidentified related form or using admittedly obsolete nomenclature
  - †Natica saffordia
- Neotoma
  - †Neotoma floridana
- Notophthalmus
- Nuculana
  - †Nuculana hannahae
  - †Nuculana saffordana
- Odocoileus
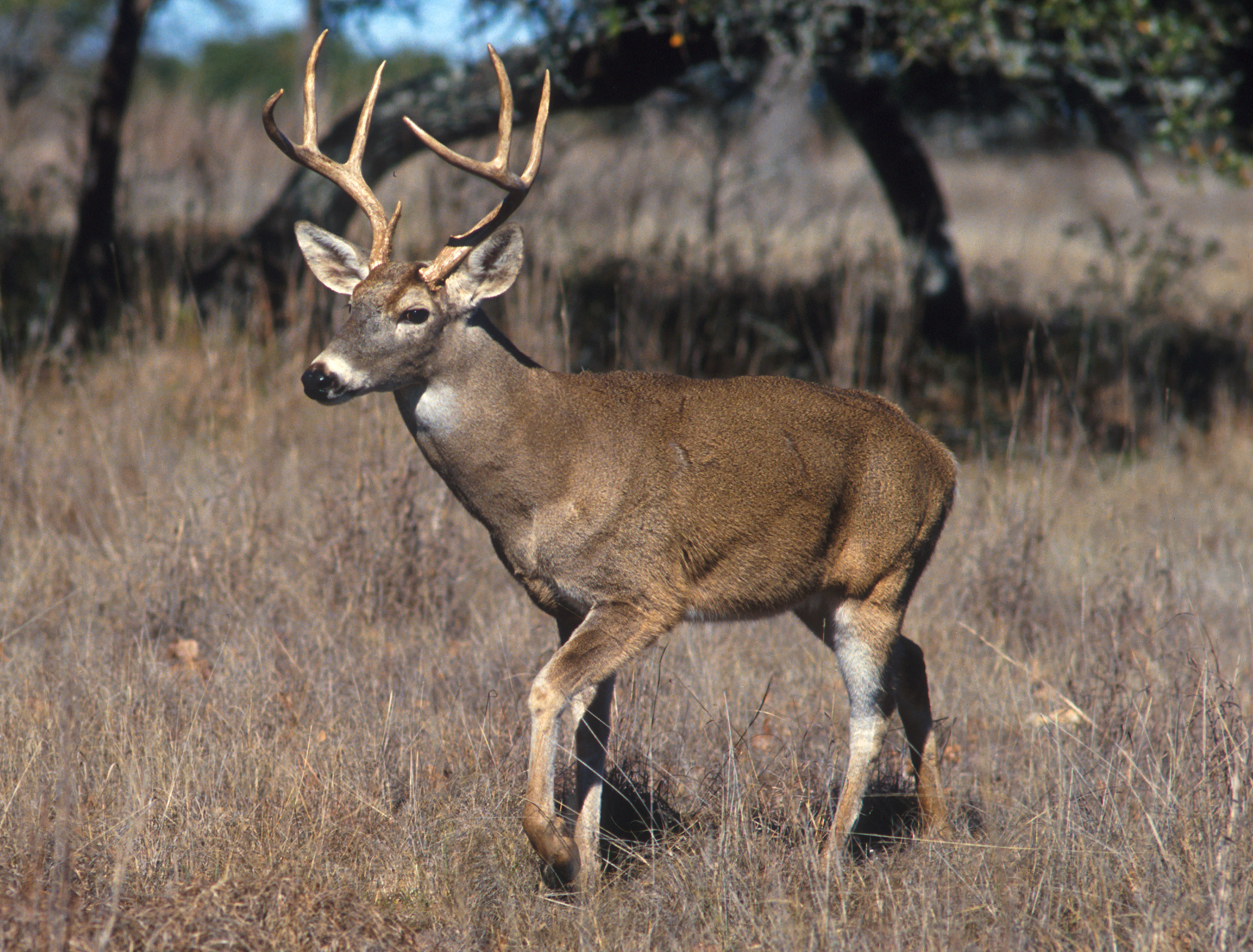
  - A living Odocoileus virginianus, or white-tailed deer
    †Odocoileus virginianus
- Ondatra
  - †Ondatra zibethicus
- Orthoyoldia
  - †Orthoyoldia kindlei
- Ostrea
  - †Ostrea crenulimarginata
  - †Ostrea pulaskensis
- †Otiorhynchites
  - †Otiorhynchites wilcoxianus
- †Ovibovini
- Paleofroeschnerius – type locality for genus
  - †Paleofroeschnerius magnus – type locality for species
- †Paleojulacea – type locality for genus
  - †Paleojulacea laxa – type locality for species
- Panthera
  - †Panthera onca
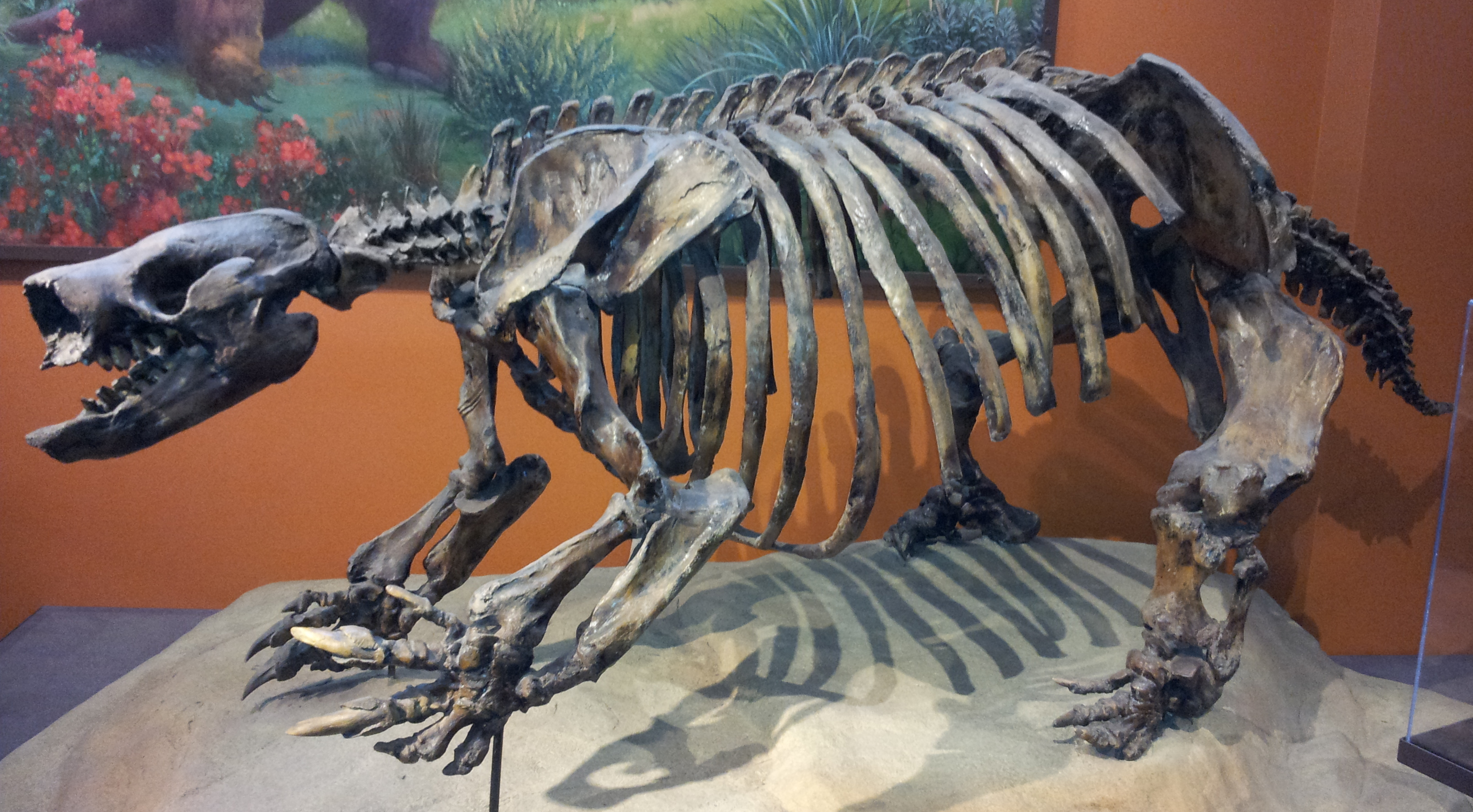
- Fossilized skeleton of the Pliocene-Pleistocene ground sloth Paramylodon
  †Paramylodon
- Pedioecetes
  - †Pedioecetes phasianellus
- Perisoreus
  - †Perisoreus canadensis
- Phenacomys
  - †Phenacomys intermedius
- Pholadomya
  - †Pholadomya mauryi
- Picoides
  - †Picoides villosus
- Pinicola
  - †Pinicola enucleator
- Pinus
- Pipilo
  - †Pipilo erythrophthalmus
- Pitar – tentative report
  - †Pitar ripleyanus
- Pituophis
- Plethodon
- †Plionarctos
- Life restoration of the Miocene-Pliocene red panda Pristinailurus, or Bristol's panda
  †Pristinailurus – type locality for genus
  - †Pristinailurus bristoli – type locality for species
- Procyon
  - †Procyon lotor
- Quercus
- †Regina – or unidentified comparable form
- Salix
- Sayornis
  - †Sayornis phoebe
- Sciurus
  - †Sciurus carolinensis
- Scolopax
  - †Scolopax minor
- Sistrurus – or unidentified comparable form
- Sitta
  - †Sitta canadensis
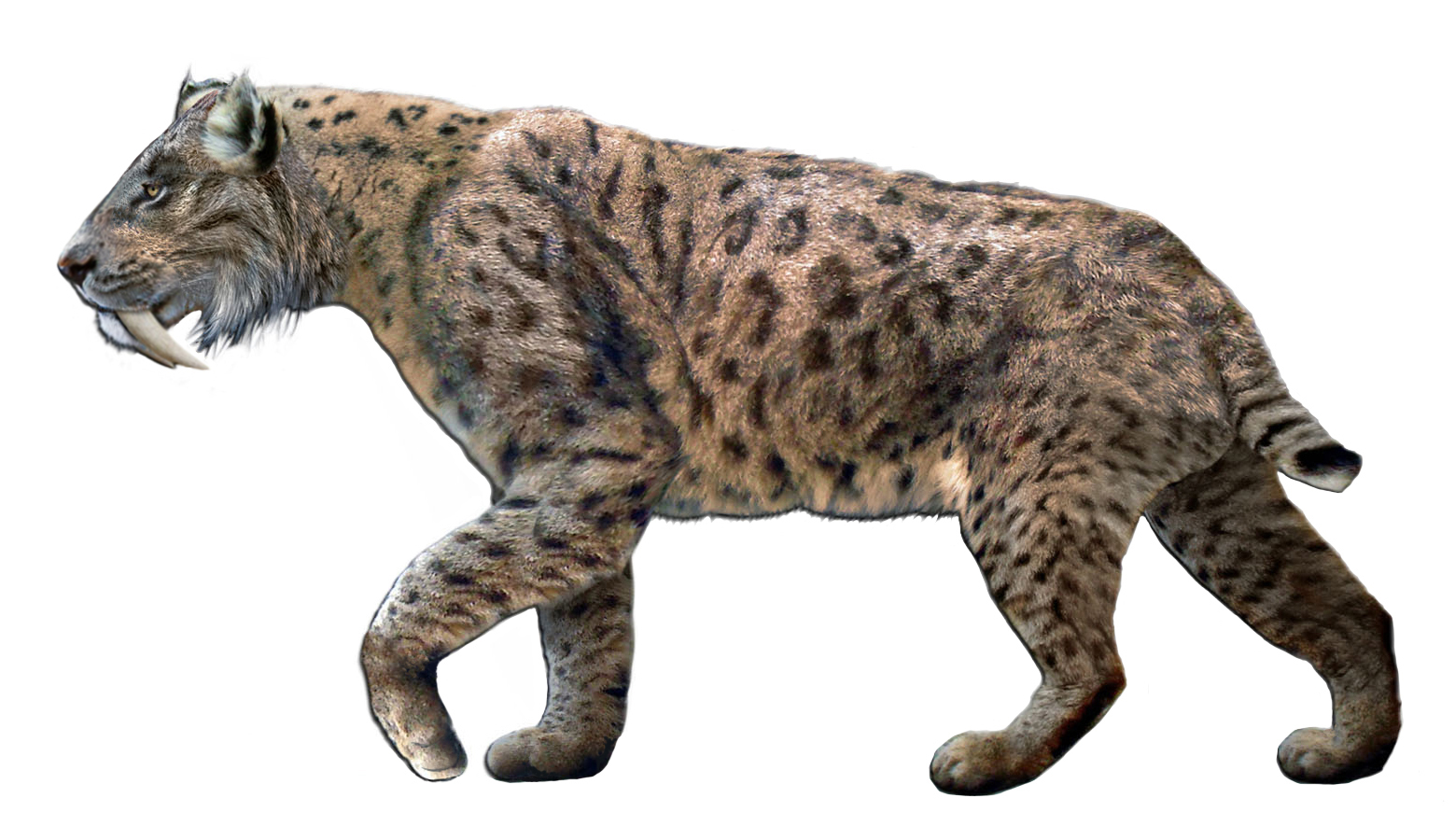
- Life restoration of the Pleistocene-Holocene saber-tooth cat Smilodon
  †Smilodon
  - †Smilodon fatalis
- Sorex
  - †Sorex arcticus
  - †Sorex hoyi
  - †Sorex palustris
- Spermophilus
  - †Spermophilus tridecemlineatus
- Sternotherus
- Strix
  - †Strix varia
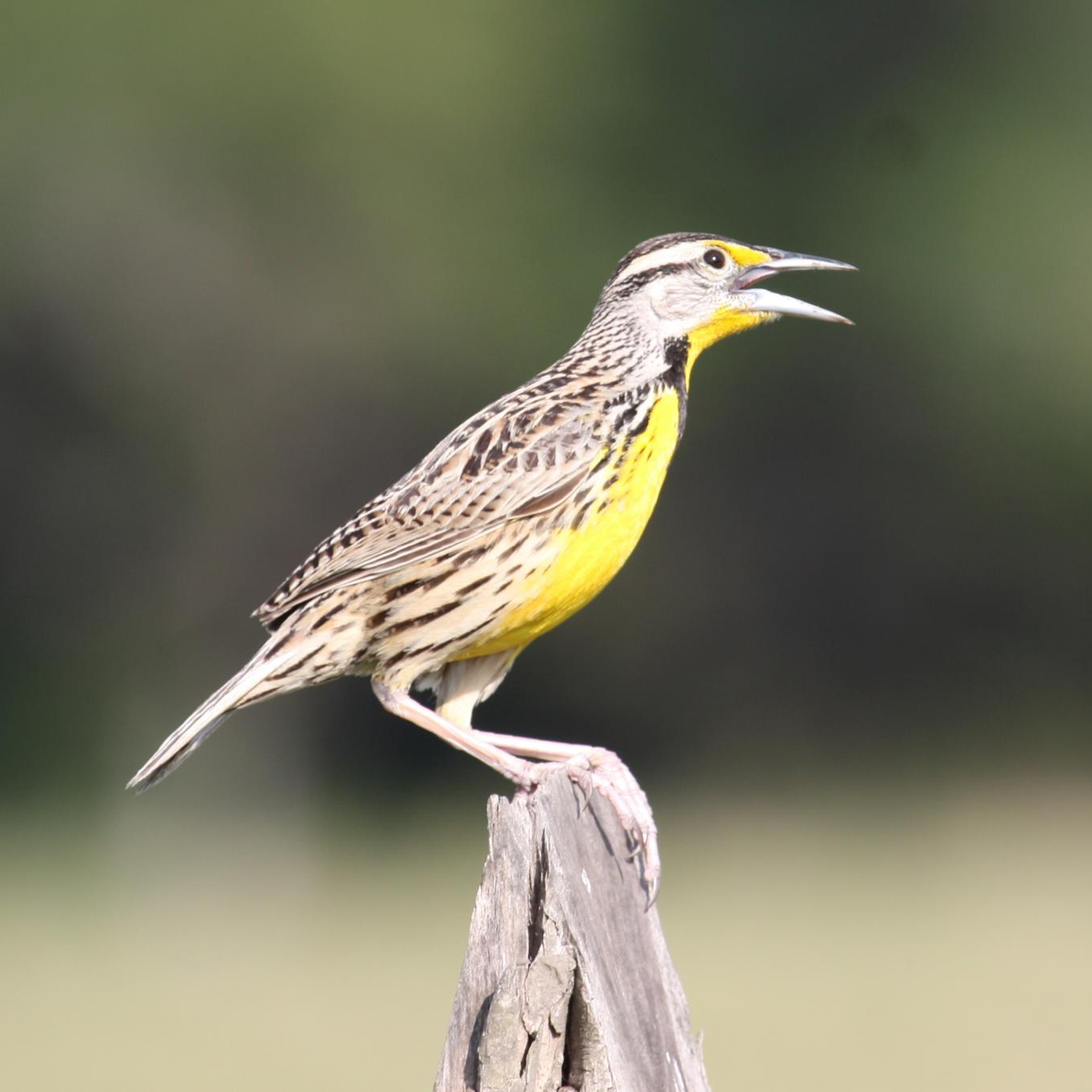
- A living Sturnella magna, or eastern meadowlark
  Sturnella
- Surnia
  - †Surnia ulula
- Sylvilagus
  - †Sylvilagus aquaticus – or unidentified comparable form
  - †Sylvilagus floridanus
- Tamias
  - †Tamias striatus
- Tamiasciurus
  - †Tamiasciurus hudsonicus
- Tapirus
  - †Tapirus haysii
  - †Tapirus polkensis
  - †Tapirus veroensis
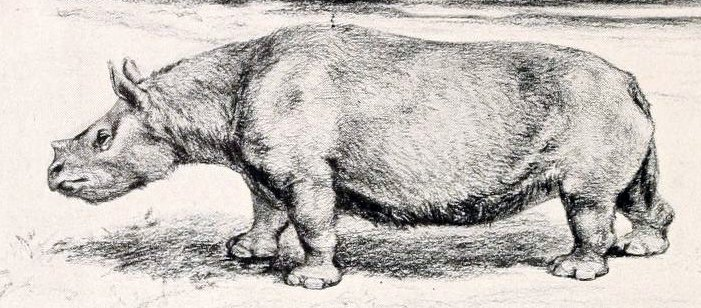
- Restoration of the Miocene-Pliocene rhinoceros Teleoceras
  †Teleoceras
  - †Teleoceras aepysoma – type locality for species
- Tellina
  - †Tellina estellensis
- †Tornatellaea
  - †Tornatellaea quercollis
- Trachemys
- †Trigonobalanoidea – type locality for genus
  - †Trigonobalanoidea americana – type locality for species
- †Tsuga
- Turdus
  - †Turdus migratorius
- Turritella
  - †Turritella saffordi
  - †Turritella tennesseensis
- Tympanuchus
  - †Tympanuchus cupido
- Ulmus
- Ursus
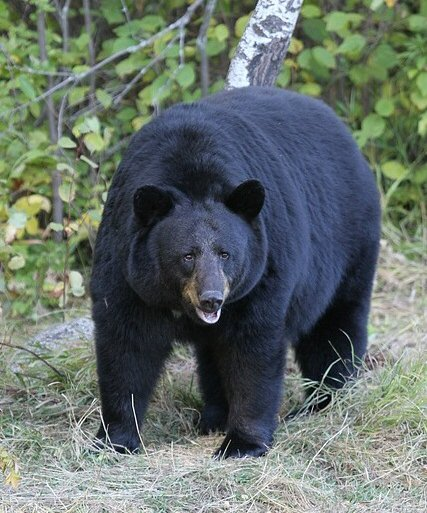
  - A living Ursus americanus, or American black bear
    †Ursus americanus
- Venericardia
  - †Venericardia hijuana
  - †Venericardia mediaplata
- Zonotrichia
  - †Zonotrichia albicollis
