= Rocellaria stimpsonii =

Scientific classification
- Domain: Eukaryota
- Kingdom: Animalia
- Phylum: Mollusca
- Class: Bivalvia
- Order: Gastrochaenida
- Superfamily: Gastrochaenoidea
- Family: Gastrochaenidae
- Genus: Rocellaria
- Species: R. stimpsonii

Binomial name
- Rocellaria stimpsonii Tryon, 1861

Species of bivalve

Rocellaria stimpsonii, with its common name the Stimpson chimney clam, is a species of saltwater clam, a marine bivalve mollusc in the family Gastrochaenidae, that can be found in the Gulf of Mexico.

This small species bores into calcareous surfaces, including the shells of other bivalves. The clam forms a living space which is lined with calcium carbonate and is shaped like a bottle, hence the common name "chimney clam."

== Description ==
The shell of this bivalve grows to a size of 18 mm (0.71 in). The valves are white and translucent; they are also thin and delicate with a large gape at the front end towards the dorsal surface of the animal.
