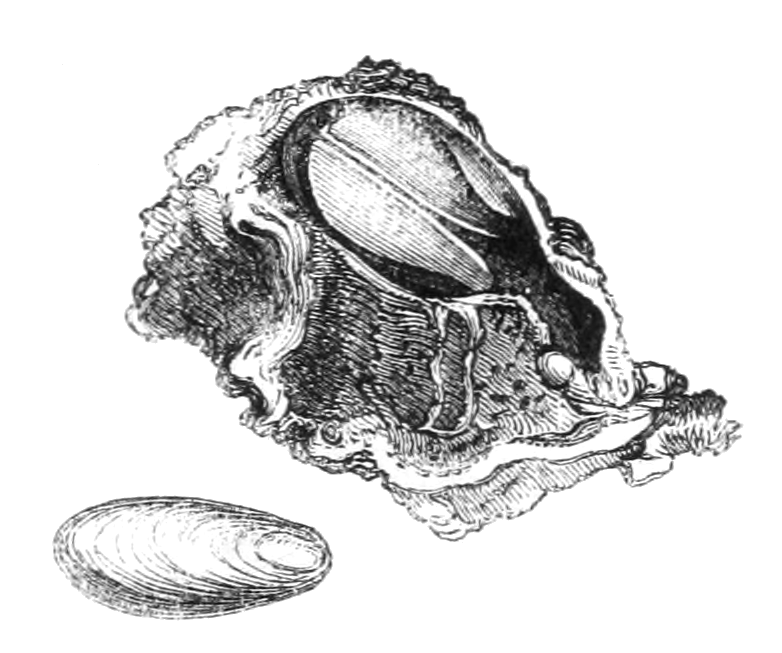
- Rocellaria dubia

Scientific classification
- Domain: Eukaryota
- Kingdom: Animalia
- Phylum: Mollusca
- Class: Bivalvia
- Order: Gastrochaenida
- Superfamily: Gastrochaenoidea
- Family: Gastrochaenidae
- Genus: Rocellaria; Blainville, 1828

Species
- See text

= Rocellaria =

Genus of bivalves

Rocellaria is a genus of saltwater clams, marine bivalve molluscs in the family Gastrochaenidae.

== Species ==
Species within the genus Rocellaria include:

- Rocellaria carcellesi (Z. J. de Castellanos, 1970)
- Rocellaria dubia (Pennant, 1777)
- Rocellaria stimpsonii Tryon, 1861
