= Costellirostra tennesseensis =

Costellirostra tennesseensis Temporal range: Early Devonian 419–393 Ma

Scientific classification
- Domain: Eukaryota
- Kingdom: Animalia
- Phylum: Brachiopoda
- Class: Rhynchonellata
- Order: Rhynchonellida
- Family: †Eatoniidae
- Genus: †Costellirostra
- Species: †C. tennesseensis

Binomial name
- †Costellirostra tennesseensis Dunbar

Extinct species of brachiopod

Costellirostra tennesseensis is an extinct brachiopod from the Early Devonian period. They typically measure no more than 3 cm (1.2 in) in diameter, and are most commonly found in the Ross Formation located in the Vulcan Quarry in Parsons, Tennessee.
