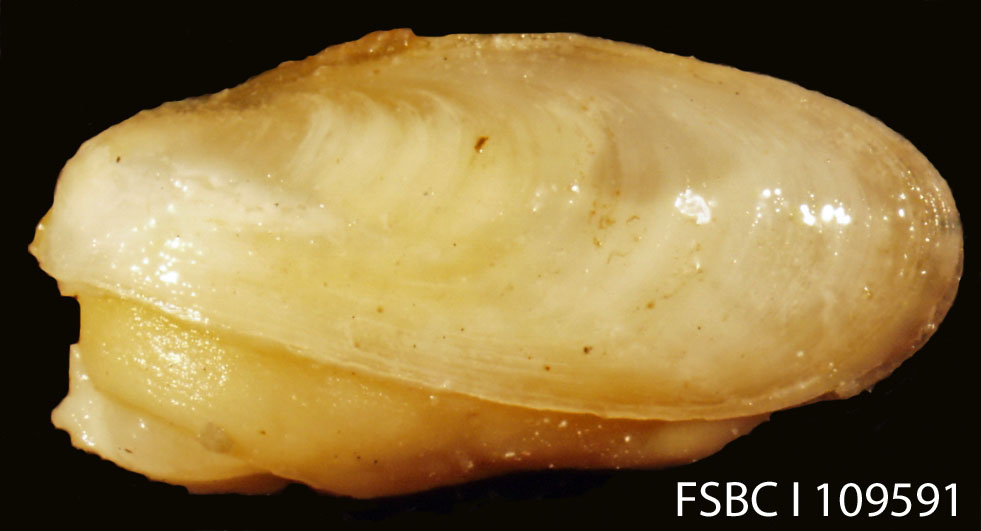
- Gastrochaena cf. ovata

Scientific classification
- Domain: Eukaryota
- Kingdom: Animalia
- Phylum: Mollusca
- Class: Bivalvia
- Order: Gastrochaenida
- Family: Gastrochaenidae
- Genus: Gastrochaena (Spengler, 1783)

Species
- See text

Synonyms
- Chaena Philipsson, 1788; Gastrochena; Gastrochoena

= Gastrochaena =

Genus of bivalves

Gastrochaena is a genus of saltwater clams, marine bivalve molluscs in the family Gastrochaenidae. The type species of this genus is Gastrochaena cuneiformis.

== Species ==
Species in the genus Gastrochaena include:

- Gastrochaena brevis G.B. Sowerby I, 1834
- Gastrochaena carteri Nielsen, 1986
- Gastrochaena cuneiformis Spengler, 1783
- Gastrochaena denticulata Deshayes, 1855
- Gastrochaena difficilis Deshayes, 1855
- Gastrochaena frondosa Cotton, 1934
- Gastrochaena humilis Deshayes, 1855
- Gastrochaena kanaka Dall, Bartsch & Rehder, 1938
- Gastrochaena macroschisma Deshayes, 1855
- Gastrochaena ovata Sowerby I, 1834
- Gastrochaena philippinensis Deshayes, 1855
- Gastrochaena spathulata Deshayes, 1855
