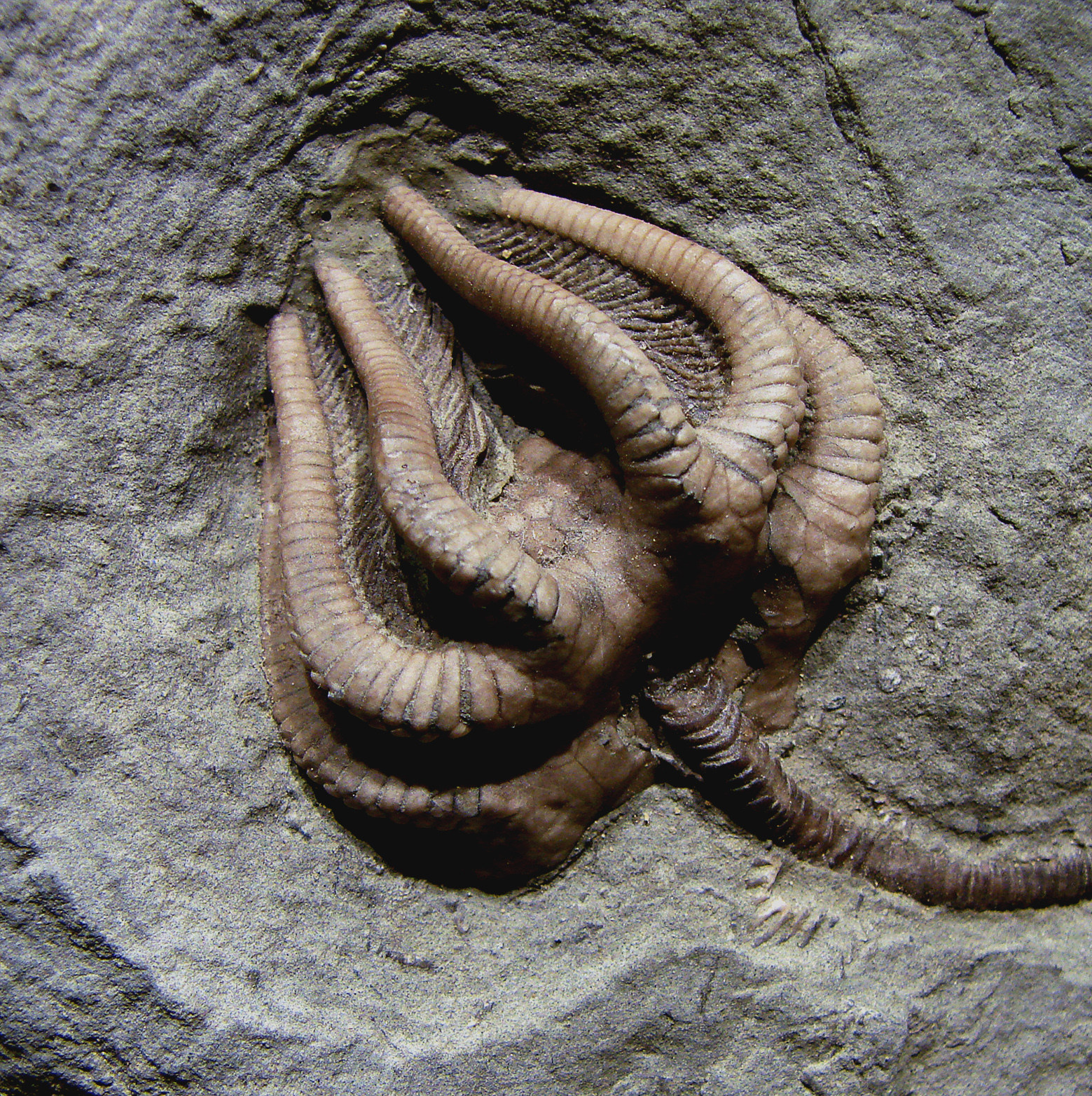
- Calyx with arms and pinnules

Scientific classification
- Kingdom: Animalia
- Phylum: Echinodermata
- Class: Crinoidea
- Order: †Monobathrida
- Family: †Coelocrinidae
- Genus: †Agaricocrinus
- Species: †A. americanus

Binomial name
- †Agaricocrinus americanus

= Agaricocrinus americanus =

Agaricocrinus americanus Temporal range: Lower Mississippian, 345 Ma

Species of echinoderm

Agaricocrinus americanus, also known as the mushroom crinoid or American crinoid, is a species of extinct crinoid. Its fossils can be found in the U.S. states of Indiana, Tennessee and Kentucky. They date back to the Lower Mississippian, about 345 million years ago.

== Fossil beds ==
One of the locations from which Agaricocrinus americanus is known is the Edwardsville Formation, in the vicinity of Crawfordsville, Montgomery County, Indiana, in the United States. In this fossil-rich bed have been found the fossils of sixty species of crinoid, distributed among more than forty genera. It is thought that the various species had different length stalks so that they could capture plankton drifting past at various heights above the substrate. The fossil beds were formed at a time when the seabed was much higher than it is today. It is believed that the crinoids were buried in sediment from nearby deltas during storms. The resulting siltstone deposits are soft enough for the fossils to be extracted in three-dimensional relief.

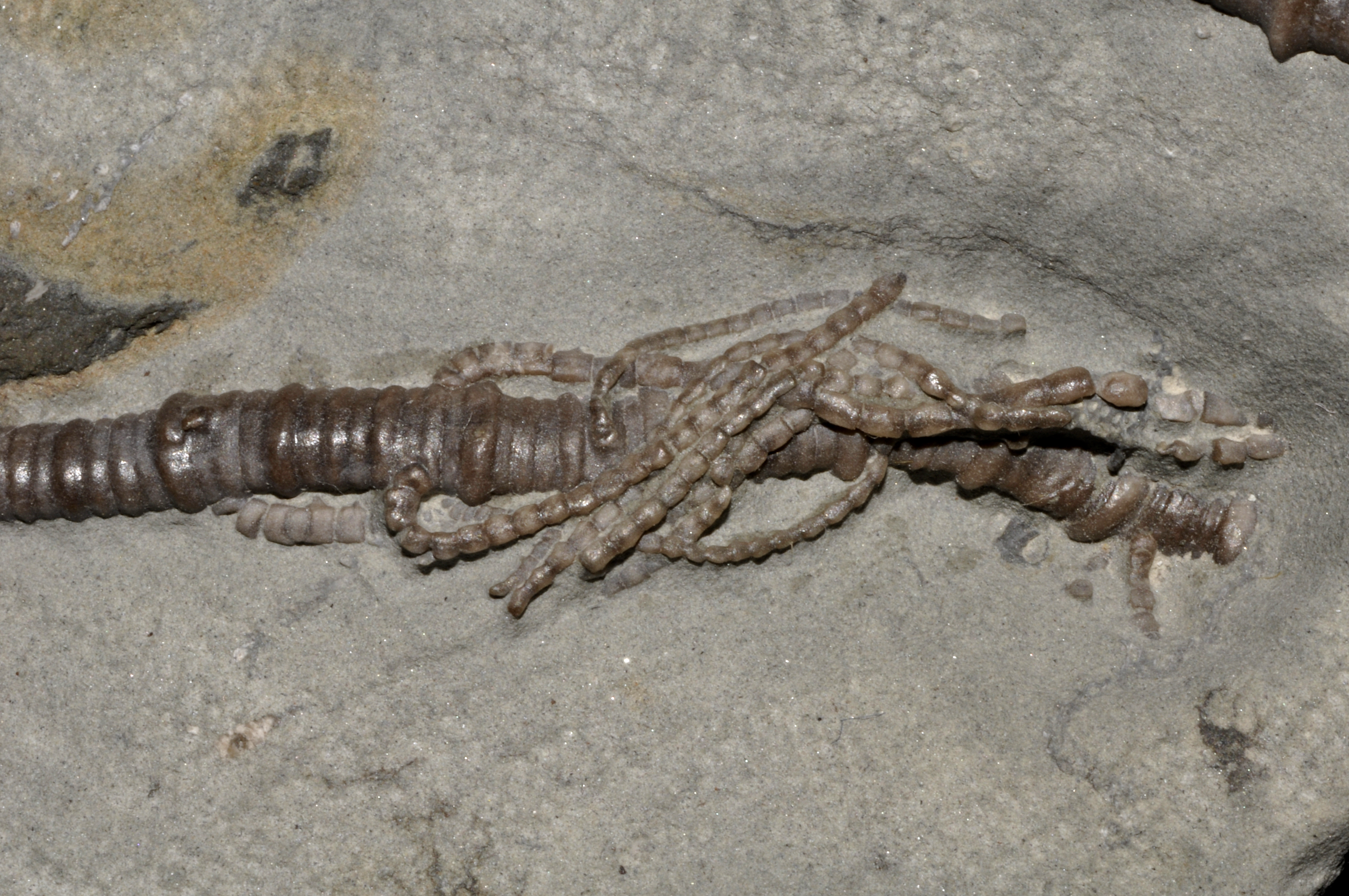
Stalk and detached arms

Other fossils of this species have been found in similar sedimentary rocks in Whites Creek in Davidson County, Tennessee, from Osagean rocks in Kentucky, and more recently from the Fort Payne Formation near the boundary between Tennessee and Kentucky. Certain morphological differences have been found between various specimens from these different locations and new finds have often been claimed as new species. David Meyer and William Ausich studied the genus Agaricocrinus in 1997 and proposed that A. arcula, A. dissimilis, A. elegans, A. podagricus, A. ponderosus, A. profundus and A. tugurium should be brought into synonymy with Agaricocrinus americanus. A closely related but less common species is Agaricocrinus crassus.

== Description ==
Like extant crinoids, Agaricocrinus americanus was anchored to a hard surface by a holdfast out of which grew an articulated stalk. On top of this was a calyx with a number of feather-like arms. Each arm bore short branches known as pinnules and from these cirri were extended which sifted plankton from the water flowing past.
