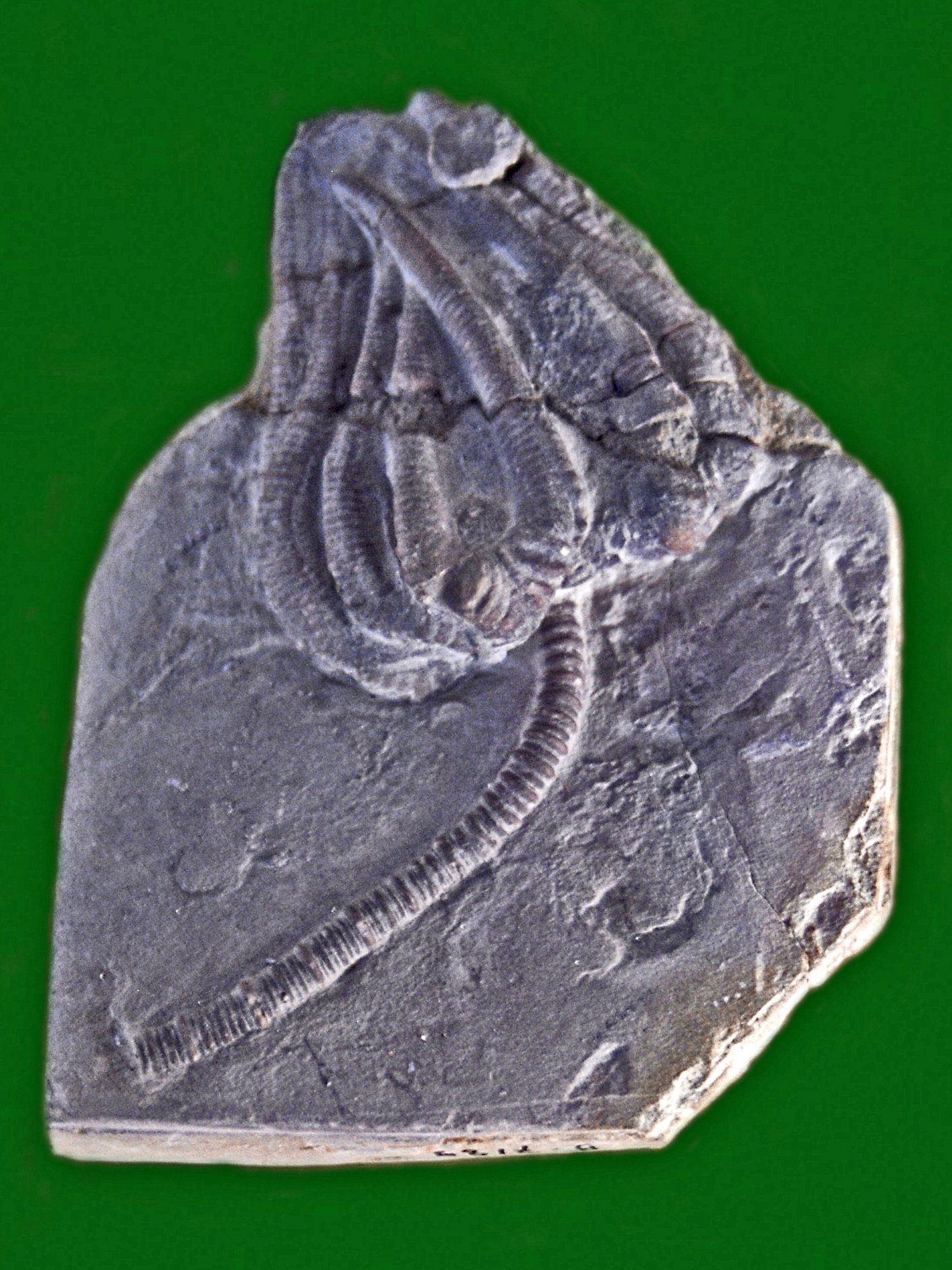
- Fossil specimen of Agaricocrinus splendens from United States, on display at Galerie de paléontologie et d'anatomie comparée in Paris

Scientific classification
- Kingdom: Animalia
- Phylum: Echinodermata
- Class: Crinoidea
- Order: †Monobathrida
- Family: †Coelocrinidae
- Genus: †Agaricocrinus; Austin, 1851

= Agaricocrinus =

Agaricocrinus Temporal range: Carboniferous

Genus of echinoderms

Agaricocrinus is a genus of extinct crinoids, belonging to the family Coelocrinidae.

These stationary upper-level epifaunal suspension feeders lived in the Carboniferous period and in the Osagean age of United States, from 353.8 to 345.0 Ma.

== Selected species ==
- Agaricocrinus americanus Roemer
- Agaricocrinus splendens Miller and Gurley

== Description ==
Like extant crinoids, Agaricocrinus species was anchored to a hard surface by a holdfast out of which grew an articulated stalk. On top of this was a calyx with a number of feather-like arms. Each arm bore short branches known as pinnules and from these cirri were extended which sifted plankton from the water flowing past.
