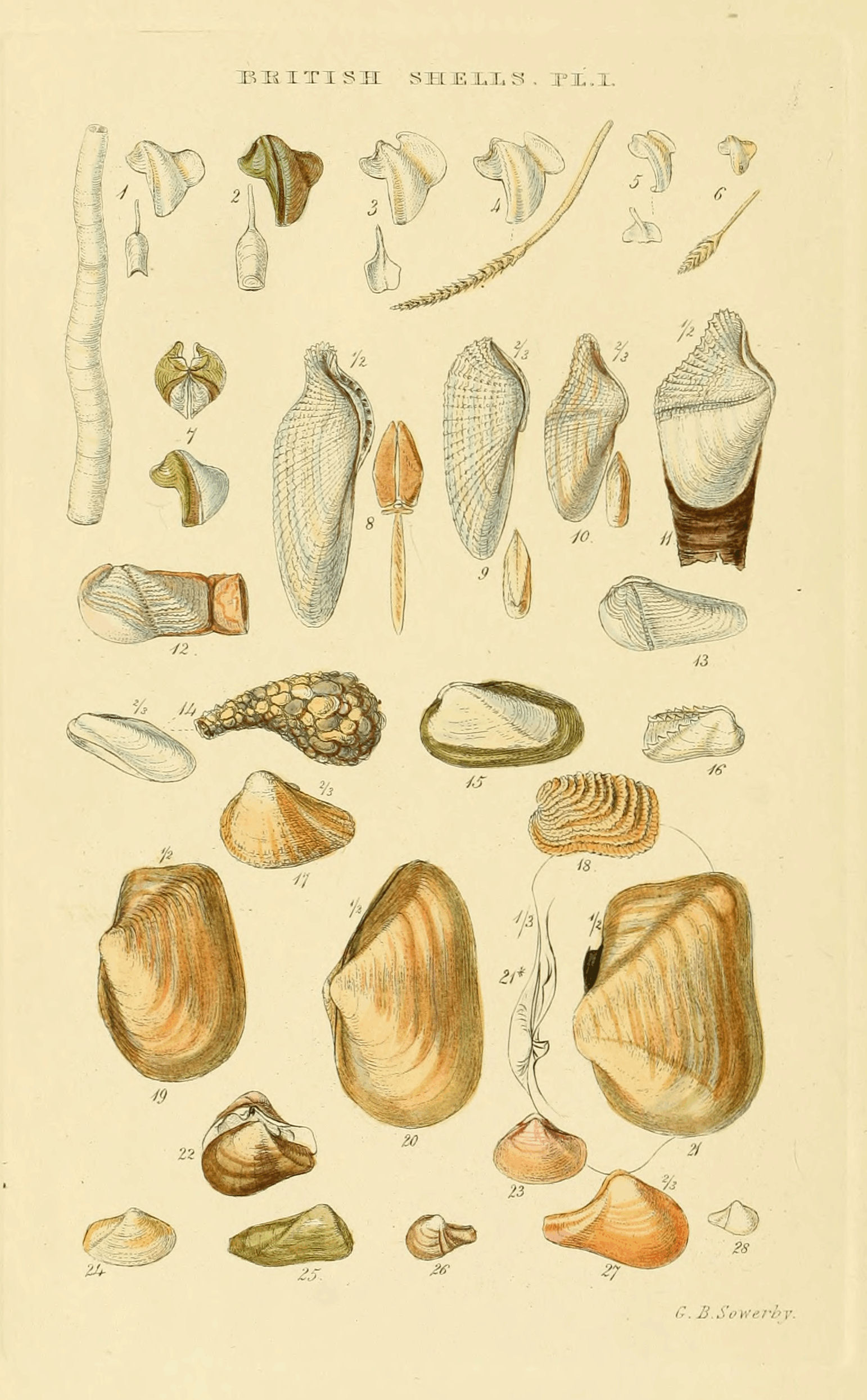
- Rocellaria dubia figure 14

Scientific classification
- Kingdom: Animalia
- Phylum: Mollusca
- Class: Bivalvia
- Subterclass: Euheterodonta
- Superorder: Imparidentia
- Order: Gastrochaenida; Lange de Morretes, 1949
- Superfamily: Gastrochaenoidea; Gray, 1840
- Family: Gastrochaenidae; Gray, 1840

Genera
- See text

= Gastrochaenidae =

Family of bivalves

Gastrochaenidae is a taxonomic family of saltwater clams, marine bivalve molluscs in the order Gastrochaenida.

== Genera ==
Genera within the family Gastrochaenidae include:

- Cucurbitula Gould, 1861
- Dufoichaena Jousseaume in Lamy, 1925
- Eufistulana Eames, 1951
- Gastrochaena Spengler, 1783
- Lamychaena Freneix, 1979
- Rocellaria Blainville, 1828
- Spengleria Tryon, 1861
- Spenglerichaena Carter, 2011
