= Melbourne Formation =

Geologic formation in Australia

- Stratigraphic range: Silurian (Ludlow) 426.7–422.7 Ma
- Type: Formation
- Unit of: Dargile Group
- Underlies: Humevale Formation (Kilmore & Upper Plenty); Ivor Sandstone (Heathcote)
- Overlies: Yan Yean Formation
- Thickness: 300 metres (980 ft) (Christmas Hills); 330 metres (1,080 ft) (Heathcote); 800 metres (2,600 ft) (Upper Plenty)

Lithology
- Primary: Shale, mudstone, siltstone
- Other: Sandstone, coquina

Location
- Coordinates: 37.8°S 145.0°E
- Approximate paleocoordinates: 2.1°S 174.9°E
- Region: Victoria
- Country: Australia
- Extent: Lachlan Orogen

Type section
- Named for: Melbourne
- Named by: Schleiger
- Year defined: 1974
- Melbourne Formation (Australia) Melbourne Formation (Victoria)

The Melbourne Formation is a geologic formation in Victoria, Australia. It preserves fossils dating back to the Ludlow series of the Silurian period.

== Stratigraphy & thickness ==
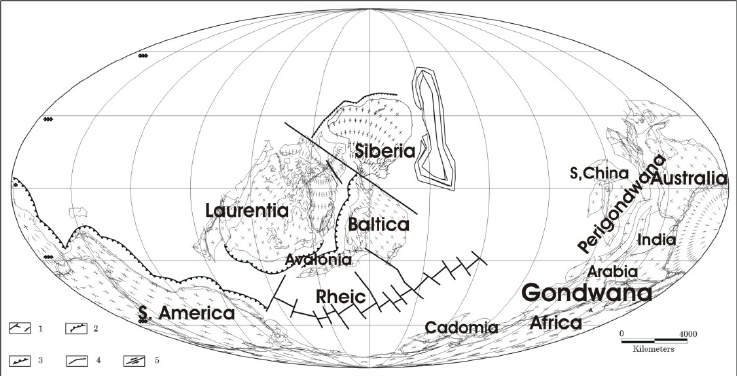
Paleogeography of the Early Silurian, 435 Ma

The Melbourne Formation, part of the Murrindindi Supergroup, is conformably overlain by the Humevale Formation and overlies the Yan Yean and Anderson Creek Formations. The formation comprises mainly thin-bedded siltstone and sandstones. Most beds show undisturbed Bouma sequences. It is found in extensive exposures across the eastern and central areas of the Darraweit Guim Province, and the thickness varies across this region, measuring 300 metres (980 ft) in Chriastmas Hills, 330 metres (1,080 ft) in Heathcote, and 800 metres (2,600 ft) in Upper Plenty.

== Lithology ==
The lithological composition consists of thin (1–30 cm (0.39–11.81 in) inter-bedded mudstone, siltstone and graded or laminated sandstone, with cross-bedding and ripple marks. Shelly coquinal sandstone, well sorted and up to 50 cm (20 in) in thickness, occurs in the Melbourne city area, but is better developed at Brunswick in association with basal lag breccias which contain 10 cm (3.9 in) thick mud rip-up clasts, a capping siltstone rich in starfish, and a distinctive trilobite assemblage.

In the Kilmore area, thicker siltstone contains distinctive, 5 cm (2.0 in) nodular or lenticular concentrations of skeletal fragments, deduced to be infilled burrows. Is with the Yan Yean Formation, the lithology of the Heathcote area is much more diverse lithologically than further south, including a massive sandstone-conglomerate.

== Biostratigraphy and correlation ==
Assemblages of graptolites from the majority of localities in the Melbourne Formation can be confidently be assigned to the early Ludlow nilssoni Biozone. At PL299 (F31, Kilmore), a little above the base of the unit, S. incipiens and S. chimaera appear, occasionally appearing at the top of the sequence. Elsewhere in the world, S. chimaera occur in the top half nilssoni Biozone, to which the biota of the Melbourne Formation can be correlated to. There is no trace of L. progenitor in the sequence, which in other areas of the world is a Biozone of its own, in between the nilssoni and scanicus Biozones. Regardless, the L. progenitor Biozone should be the equivalent to the upper nilssoni Biozone of the Melbourne Formation. B. bohemicus specimens from PL1623 (F10, Upper Plenty), in the upper strata, showcase a slight morphologic trend toward B. bohemicus tenuis, an indicator species of the scanius Biozone, featuring a slightly flared aperture to the sicula.

A trilobite assemblage, notably abundant, appears throughout the Melbourne Formation, and is mainly characterised by Cromus and Maurotarion. This biota includes M. euryceps, C. simpliciculus, C. spryi, Raphiophorus jikaensis, Sthenarocalymene kilmorensis, Trimerus harrisoni, Ananaspis woiwurrungi, and Kettneraspis hollowayi. These species are mostly endemic to the formation, with the exception of dubious records of M. euryceps and S. kilmorensis from the Yan Yean Formation.

The Melbourne Formation correlates with the uppermost beds of the Yea Formation, indicated via correlation of the overlying Rices Hill Sandstone Member with the Clonbinane Member, and the lower beds of the Yea Formation with the Yan Yean Formation.

== Paleobiota ==
Color key: Taxon / Reclassified taxon / Taxon falsely reported as present / Dubious taxon or junior synonym / Ichnotaxon / Ootaxon / Morphotaxon

Notes
Uncertain or tentative taxa are in small text
~~crossed out~~ taxa are discredited.

=== Brachiopoda ===
Brachiopods of the Melbourne Formation
Genus	Species	Clade	Image
Jonesea (Formerly Aegiria)	A. thomasi	Strophomenida, Aegiromenidae	
Strophochonetes	S. melbournensis	Productida, Strophochonetidae	

=== Chelicerata ===
Cheliceratans of the Melbourne Formation
Genus	Species	Clade	Image
Pterygotidae indet. (Formerly Pterygotus australis)	sp. indet.	Eurypterida, Pterygotidae	

=== Graptolithina ===
Graptolites of the Melbourne Formation
Genus	Species	Clade	Image
Bohemograptus	B. (Egregiograptus) tsegelnuki	Graptoloidea, Glyptograptidae	
Monograptus	M. ludensis yarraensis	Graptoloidea, Glyptograptidae	Fossil of the related M. priodon. Scale bar 1 mm.
Monograptus	M. uncinatus praeprognatus	Graptoloidea, Glyptograptidae	Fossil of the related M. priodon. Scale bar 1 mm.
Pristiograptus	P. jolimontensis	Graptoloidea, Glyptograptidae	
Pristiograptus	P. cf. welchae	Graptoloidea, Glyptograptidae	
Saetograptus	S. colonus heathcotensis	Graptoloidea, Glyptograptidae	

=== Trilobita ===
Trilobites of the Melbourne Formation
Genus	Species	Clade	Image
Ananaspis	"A." woiwurrungi	Phacopida, Phacopidae	Fossil of the related A. stokesii.
Arcticalymene	A. australis	Phacopida, Calymenidae	
Cromus	C. melbournensis	Phacopida, Encrinuridae	
Cromus	C. simpliciculus	Phacopida, Encrinuridae	
Cromus	C. spiyi	Phacopida, Encrinuridae	
Cromus	C. sp.	Phacopida, Encrinuridae	
Kettneraspis	K. hollowayi	Odontopleurida, Odontopleuridae	
Maurotarion	M. euryceps	Proetida, Aulacopleuridae	
Orygmatos	O. yanyeani	Phacopida, Phacopidae	
Raphiophorus	R. jikaensis	Asaphida, Raphiophoridae	
Sthenarocalymene	S. kilmorensis	Phacopida, Calymenidae	
Trimerus	T. haarrisoni	Phacopida, Homalonotidae	Reconstruction of the related T. delphinocephalus.
Acidaspidinae indet.	sp. indet.	Odontopleurida, Odontopleuridae	

=== Ichnotaxa ===
Ichnotaxa of the Melbourne Formation
Genus	Species	Notes	Image
Aulichnites	A. parkerensis	Gently curved trail with convex relief possessing a median furrow and bilobate upper surface. 0.4–0.5 cm (0.16–0.20 in) wide and 14 cm (5.5 in) long.	
Chondrites	C. intricatus	A system of tree-like branching burrows. The downward penetrating pattern is parallel or oblique to stratification and usually does not interpenetrate, preserved in concave or convex epirelief. Burrow sizes remain consistent throughout a given system, but vary between differing systems, with burrow diameters ranging between 0.1–0.2 cm (0.039–0.079 in) at angles from 25° to 50°.	Trace fossil of the related C. bollensis.
Gyrochorte	G. sp. cf. G. comosa	Horizontal, curved or straight burrows preserved in epirelief on the surface of fine-grained sandstones, with obliquely aligned, biserally arranged, transverse plaits which are separated via a median furrow, 0.3–0.4 cm (0.12–0.16 in).	
Helminthoidichnites	H. tenuis	Horizontal, curved, smooth, unbranched burrows preserved as negative epirelief on the surfaces of asymmetric ripple marks. Burrows often cross-cut each other, but it is quite rare for the same burrow to cross its previous path. Diameters of burrows are constantly around 0.1–0.2 cm (0.039–0.079 in)	
Helminthopsis	H. hieroglyphica	Irregularly meandering, unbranched, unlined, horizontal burrows which do not touch or cross themselves, preserved as smooth convex epirelief on bedding surfaces. They are recognized for their alternating winding and box-like hieroglyphic meanders and more or less straight courses. Burrows are 0.1–0.2 cm (0.039–0.079 in) in diameter and 10 cm (3.9 in).	Trace fossil of the related Helminthopsis sp.
Laevicyclus	L. mongraensis	Short, vertical or near-vertical, burrow groups of a cylindrical form preserved in convex epirelief within bedding planes of fine-grained sandstone. Individual burrows center around a central shaft. Burrows measure 0.4–0.6 cm (0.16–0.24 in) and approximately 0.5 cm (0.20 in) tall, central shaft about 0.1–0.2 cm (0.039–0.079 in) in diameter.	
Lorenzinia	?L. isp.	Smooth and simple epichnial ridges, arranged in a single plane which radiates from an oval central area. The ridges are quite similar in distribution, shape and fillings; each ridge measuring approximately 0.3–0.4 cm (0.12–0.16 in) in diameter and over 5 cm (2.0 in) long.	
Nereites	N. biserialis	Winding to meandering horizontal traces which consist of medial back-filled trails, each enveloped by two lobate zones of pustules (reworked sediment). Individual pustules are impressed with a degree of variance, and the diameters also vary, ranging from round to avoid or chevron-like in part. In some cases, adjacent pustules partially overlap. The trail measures between 5–8 cm (2.0–3.1 in) wide.	Trace fossil of the related N. irregularis.
Planolites	P. annularius	Straight to curved, horizontal, unlined, unbranched, cylindrical burrows which span 0.3 cm (0.12 in) wide by 0.2–0.3 cm (0.079–0.118 in). It is preserved in convex epirelief on the sole of fine-grained sandstone beds. Burrow surfaces are covered in annulations, both 0.3 cm (0.12 in) in thickness and width.	Trace ossil of the related P. sp.
Teichichnus	T. rectus	Unbranched and smooth straight to slightly curved burrows, which are parallel or slightly oblique to stratification. Burrows measure to 0.3–0.5 cm (0.12–0.20 in) wide, 0.5–1.5 cm (0.20–0.59 in) high, and 1–2.5 cm (0.39–0.98 in) long.	Trace fossil of T. sp.

== See also ==
- Tumblagooda Sandstone, Silurian geologic formation in Western Australia
- Yea Flora Fossil Site, Silurian fossil site in Victoria
