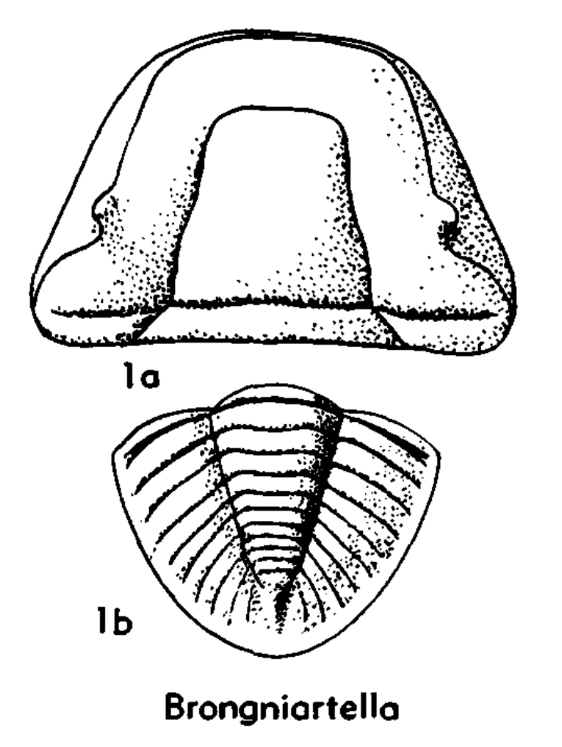
- Cephalon (1a) and pygidium (1b) of Brongniartella bisulcata

Scientific classification
- Kingdom: Animalia
- Phylum: Arthropoda
- Clade: †Artiopoda
- Class: †Trilobita
- Order: †Phacopida
- Family: †Homalonotidae
- Genus: †Brongniartella; Reed, 1918

Type species
- Brongniartella bisulcata M'Coy, 1851

Species
- Brongniartella (sensu stricto): B. bisulcata; "Brongniartella" group: at least 7 species, see text

= Brongniartella (trilobite) =

Brongniartella Temporal range: Late Ordovician–Wenlock

Extinct genus of trilobites

Brongniartella is an extinct genus of homalonotid trilobite. It is of interest as it is a potential ancestor to the homalonotid trilobites Trimerus and Platycoryphe.

== Description ==
Like other trilobites, Brongniartella is composed of three parts: a cephalon, a multisegmented thorax, and a pygidium.

The cephalon is semicircular or semielliptical and lacks a border. The glabella is well-defined and urn-shaped or tapering forward, and generally lacks furrows. The axial furrows strongly converge in front of the occipital ring. The facial sutures are gonatoparian as they intersect the margin of the cephalon near the genal angles. The rostral suture is a wide curve on the upper side of the cephalon that is near or on the anterior margin.

The 13-segmented thorax has a wide but indistinct axis, with extremely shallow axial furrows and the axis and pleurae being almost undistinguishable from the general concavity of the body. The axial furrows of the thorax form a continuous depression, but each axial ring is also independently separated from the corresponding pleura by a shallow, transverse, oblique furrow corresponding to the one crossing the occipital ring from the base of the glabella. The base of each pleura between this transverse furrow and the pleural furrow is slightly swollen, and there is a peg-like interior projection on the posterior margin of each thoracic segment that fits into a corresponding notch of the succeeding thoracic segment.

The pygidium is rounded and parabolic with a well-defined axis that ends in front of the posterior margin and a slightly indistinct, narrow posterior border. The pygidial ribs do not extend to the lateral margin of the pygidium. It is composed of 9-12 segments, and some forms bear a postaxial ridge.

== Species and interrelationships ==
Brongniartella is traditionally considered to belong to the Eohomalonotinae, though some workers have assigned it to the Homalonotinae. Congreve and Lieberman 2008 performed a cladistic analysis of Ordovician homalonotids and found that Brongniartella was paraphyletic and the basal-most species of Homalonotinae, giving rise to the genera Trimerus and Platycoryphe. They proposed redefining the genus to only include the type species B. bisulcata and moving all other species to the paraphyletic "Brongniartella" group.

Parsimony analysis of Congreve and Leiderman 2008:

- - Neseuretus vaningeni
  - - Homalonotinae
      - - - Trimerus delphinocephalus
          - - Platycoryphe dyaulax
            - - - Platycoryphe dentata
                - Platycoryphe christyi
              - Platycoryphe vulcani
        - Brongniartella trentonensis
      - Brongniartella bisulcata
    - Colpocoryphinae
      - - Plaesiacomia exul
        - - Plaesiacomia vacuvertis
          - Plaesiacomia oehlerti
      - - Colpocoryphe arago
        - Colpocoryphe rouaulti
  - Eohomalonotinae
    - - Calymenella boisselli
      - Calymenella alcantarae
    - Eohomalonotus sduzyi

Brongniartella (sensu stricto) after Congreve and Lieberman, 2008

- Type species B. bisulcata M'Coy, 1851 - Caradoc of England

"Brongniartella" group

- B. benderi Wolfart et al., 1968 - Silurian of Jordan
- B. caradociana Dean, 1961 - Caradoc of England
- B. edgelli Salter, 1865 - Caradoc of England
  - B. sp. aff. edgelli (Salter, 1865) - Silurian of Jordan
- B. minor Salter, 1852 - Caradoc of England
  - B. minor subcarinata Dean, 1961 - Caradoc of England
- B. pamiricus Balashova, 1966 - Wenlock of Kazakhstan
- B. platynota Dalman, 1828
  - B. platynota marocana Destombes, 1966 - Katian of Morocco
  - B. sp. aff. platynota (Salter, 1865) - Silurian of Jordan
- B. trentonensis Simpson, 1890 - Caradoc of Pennsylvania, USA
