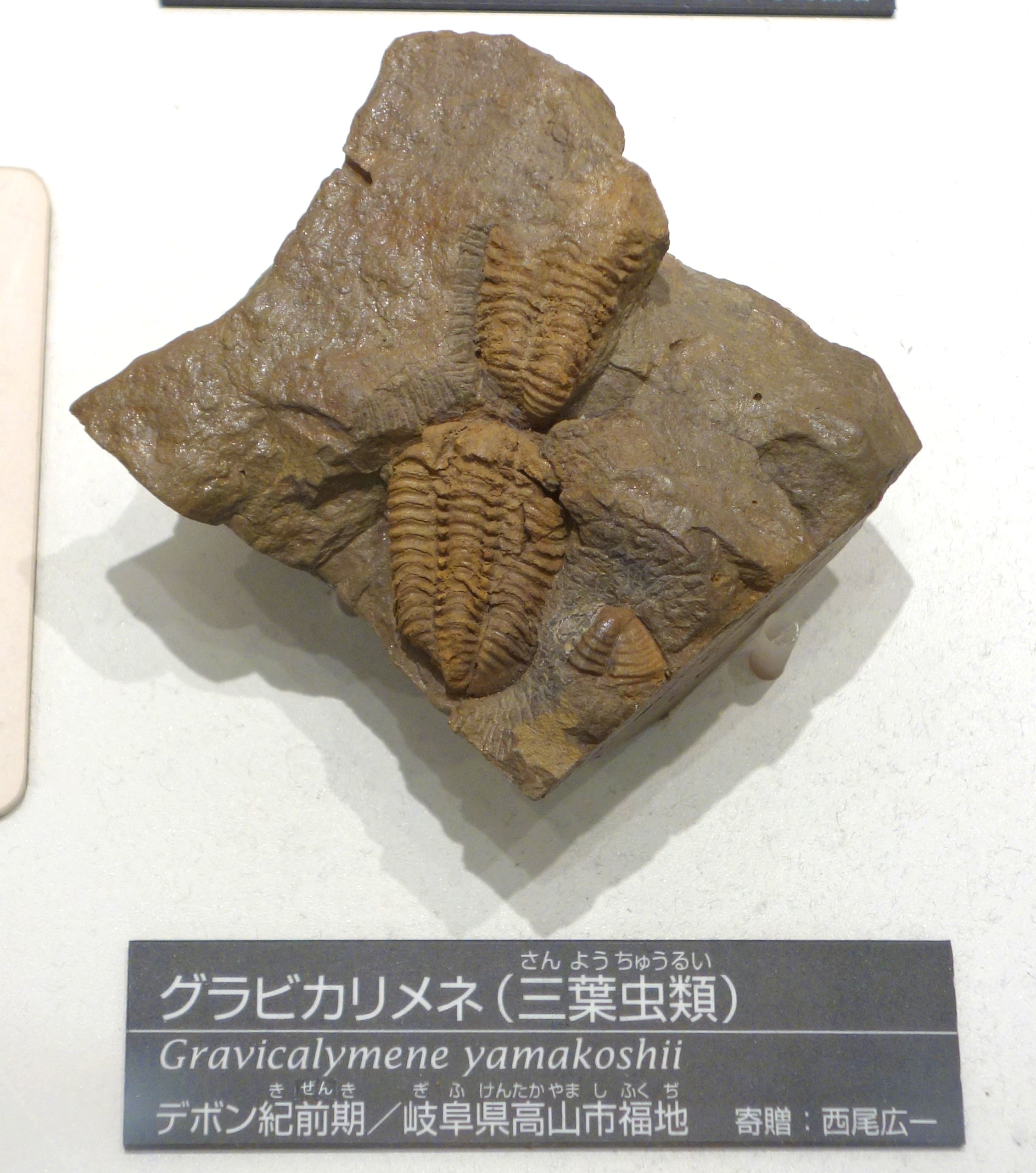
- Gravicalymene yamakoshii Kobayashi & Hamada, 1977. From the Devonian of Japan.

Scientific classification
- Kingdom: Animalia
- Phylum: Arthropoda
- Clade: †Artiopoda
- Class: †Trilobita
- Order: †Phacopida
- Family: †Calymenidae
- Genus: †Gravicalymene; Shirley, 1936

Species
- See text

= Gravicalymene =

Gravicalymene Temporal range: Middle Ordovician–Early Devonian

Extinct genus of trilobites

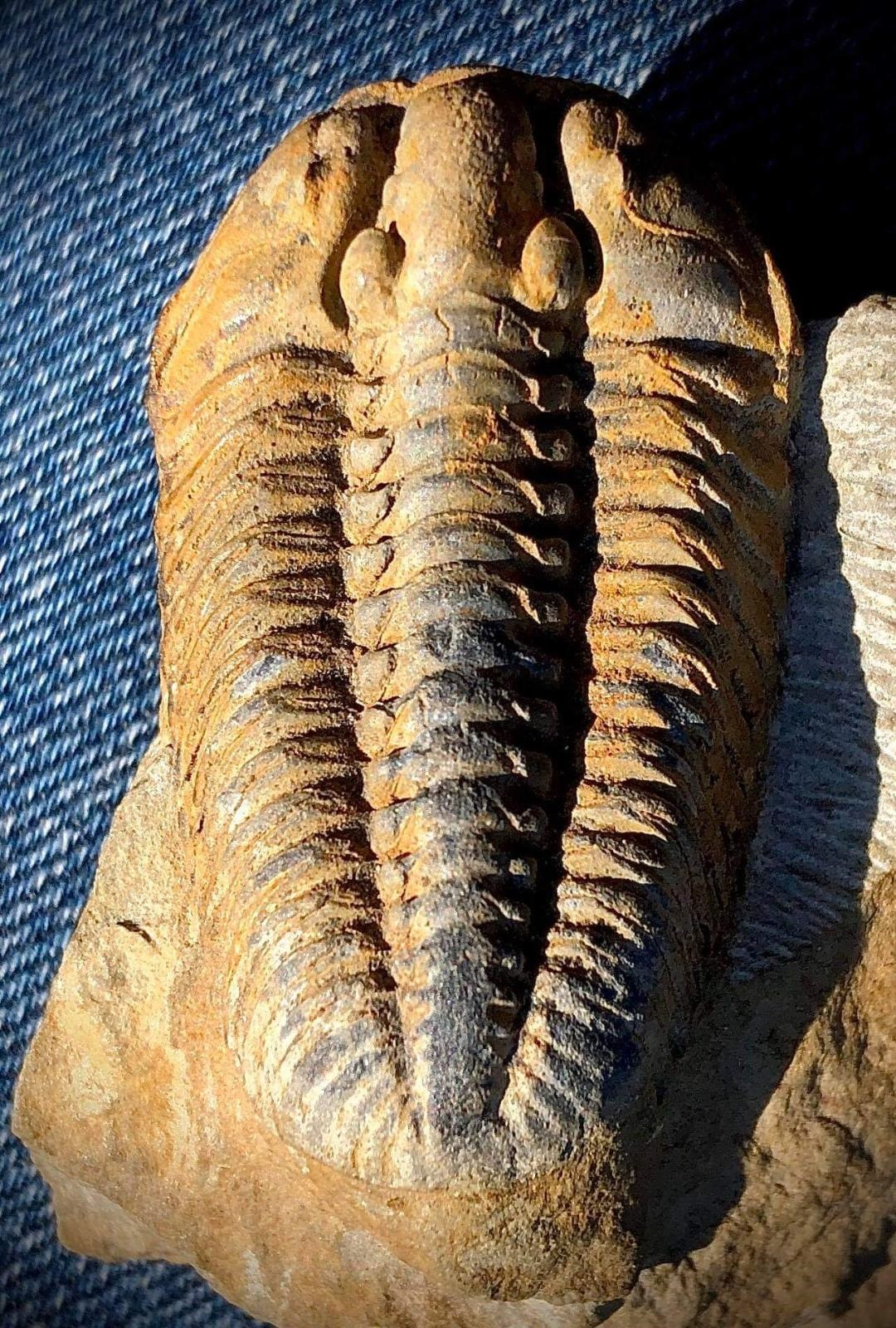
Gravicalymene arcuata Price, 1982, Rawtheyan Stage, Dolhir Formation, Cynwyd Forest, near Corwen, Wales.

Gravicalymene is a genus of trilobites belonging to the order Phacopida, suborder Calymenina and family Calymenidae. Species included in this genus have previously been allocated to Calymene Brongniart 1822,Flexicalymene Shirley, 1936. and Sthenarocalymene Siveter 1977.

Rarest within the genus is the Middle Ordovician species Gravicalymene magnotuberculata, which is also amongst the rarest of all Calymenidae and regionally confined to two exposures in New York State. G. magnotuberculata is noted for its extremely pustulose exoskeleton, bell-shaped glabella and lack of complete articulated specimens.

== Type species ==
- Gravicalymene convolva Shirley 1936, by original designation. Found only in the Birdshill Limestone (Pusgillian or lowest Cautleyan Stage) at Birdshill Quarry, near Llandeilo, South Wales.

=== Other species ===
Some known species and locations include:

- Gravicalymene arcuata Price, 1982. Rawtheyan Stage, Dolhir Formation, Cynwyd Forest Quarry, Denbighshire, North Wales, UK.
- Gravicalymene pontillis Price, 1982. From the upper Cautleyan and lower Rawtheyan of the Berwyn Range and near Conway, North Wales.
- Gravicalymene quadrata (King, 1923), from the Rawtheyan Zone 7 at Craig-Fawr Llanfyllyn and the Meifod area. (see Price, 1982). Transferred to Sthenarocalymene sp. nov. by Siveter (1977, p. 386).
- Gravicalymene praecox Bancroft, 1949, from the Smeathen Wood Beds (Harnagian Stage, Reuscholithus reuschi Biozone) near Horderley, Wistanstow, Shropshire, England.
- Gravicalymene jugifera Dean, 1962, from the pusgillian and lowermost Cautleyan in Northern England.
- Gravicalymene inflata Dean, 1963. The only known specimen is from the Onnian Stage, Onnia gracilis Zone, in the north bank of the River Onny, 100 yards east of its junction with Batch Gutter (on the A489 Horderley road, 1 km from its junction with the A49 near Wistanstow, Shropshire).
- Gravicalymene capitovata Siveter, 1977 From the Middle Ordovician of the Oslo Region, Norway.
- Gravicalymene quadrilobata Chatterton 1971. Its type locality is Chatterton Loc. C, Spirifer yassensis Lst, near Yass, NSW, which is in an early Devonian (Emsian) marine limestone in the Taemas Formation of Australia.
- Gravicalymene yamakoshii Kobayashi & Hamada, 1977. From the Devonian of Japan.
- Gravicalymene abbreviata (Foerste, 1910), southwestern Ohio, southeastern Indiana, and northern Kentucky.
- Gravicalymene bakeri (Smith & Ebach, 2020), from Late Ordovician shales of the Gordon Group in northern Tasmania. Named after Doctor Who actor Tom Baker.
- Gravicalymene hagani Ross and Barnes, 1967, Lexington Limestone, Salvisa Bed of the Lexington Limestone, 21 feet below base of Clays Ferry Formation. Section 30B (Perryville South), North America. Also Iran.
- Gravicalymene magnotuberculata (Ruedemann, 1926), from 2 localized bedding planes in the Denley Limestone, Trenton Group (Middle Ordovician), Herkimer County, New York State, United States.
- Gravicalymene truncatus Ross, 1979. Only found at its type locality, USGS 7984-CO, along Moffett Road, 0.5 miles west of Kenton, which is in an Edenian offshore ramp packstone/mudstone in the Kope Formation of Kentucky, USA.
