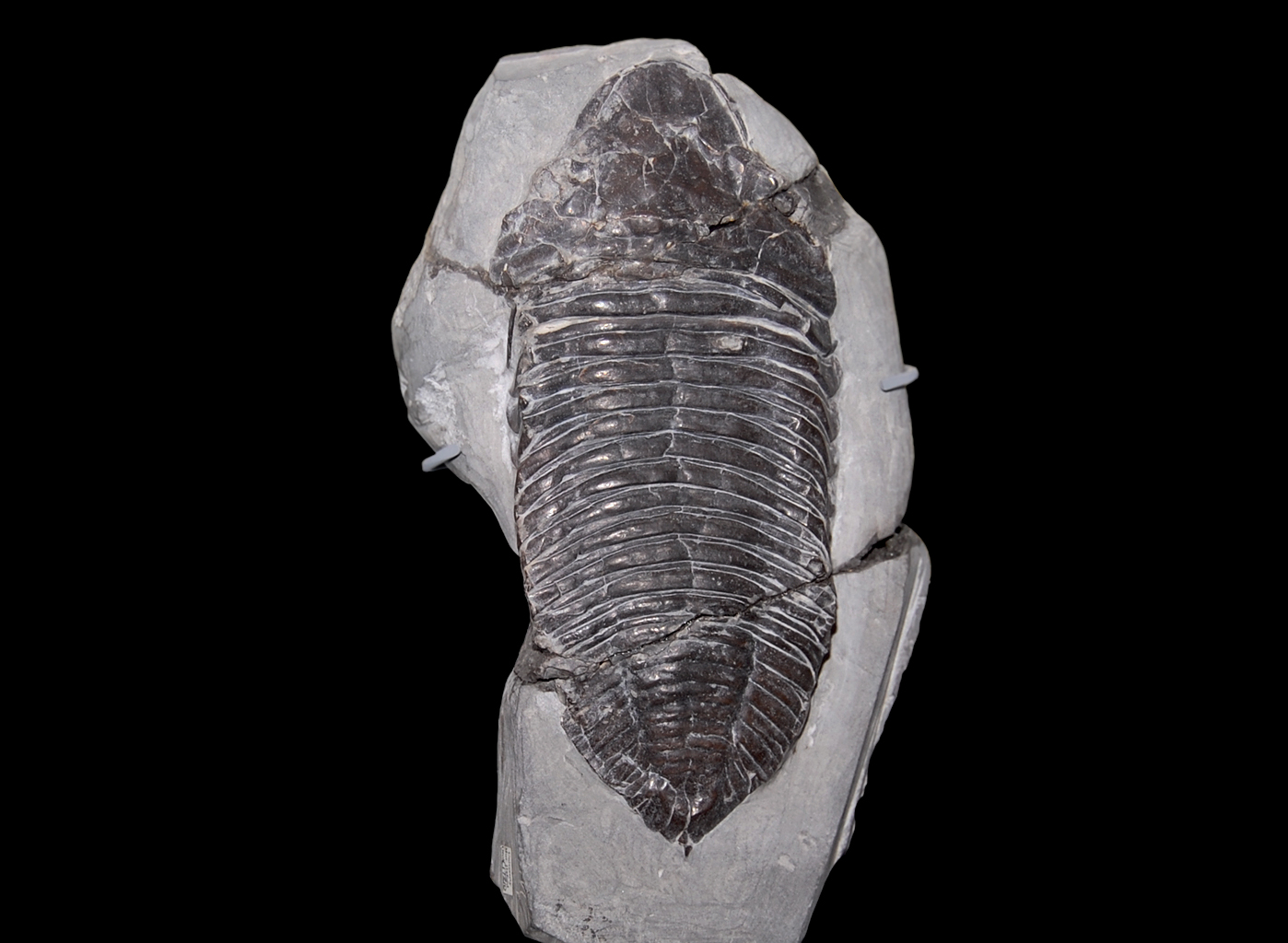
- Fossil of Trimerus (Trimerus) delphinocephalus from the Rochester Shale of North America, housed at the Oxford University Natural History Museum.
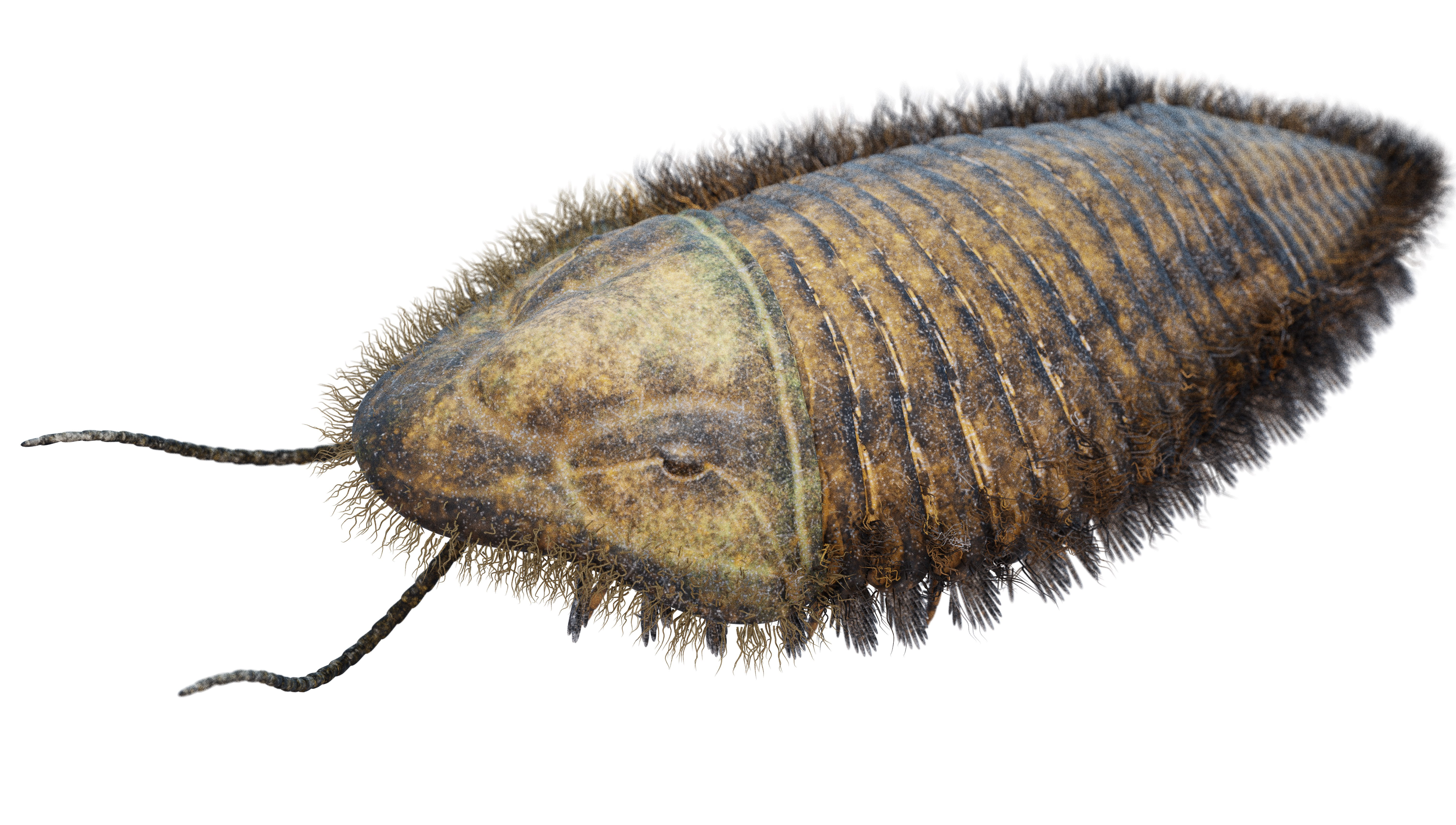
- Reconstruction of Trimerus (Trimerus) delphinocephalus from the Rochester Shale of North America.

Scientific classification
- Domain: Eukaryota
- Kingdom: Animalia
- Phylum: Arthropoda
- Class: †Trilobita
- Order: †Phacopida
- Family: †Homalonotidae
- Genus: †Trimerus; Green, 1832

Type species
- Trimerus delphinocephalus Green, 1832

Other species
- See text

= Trimerus =

Trimerus Temporal range: Llandovery–Lochkovian

Extinct genus of trilobites

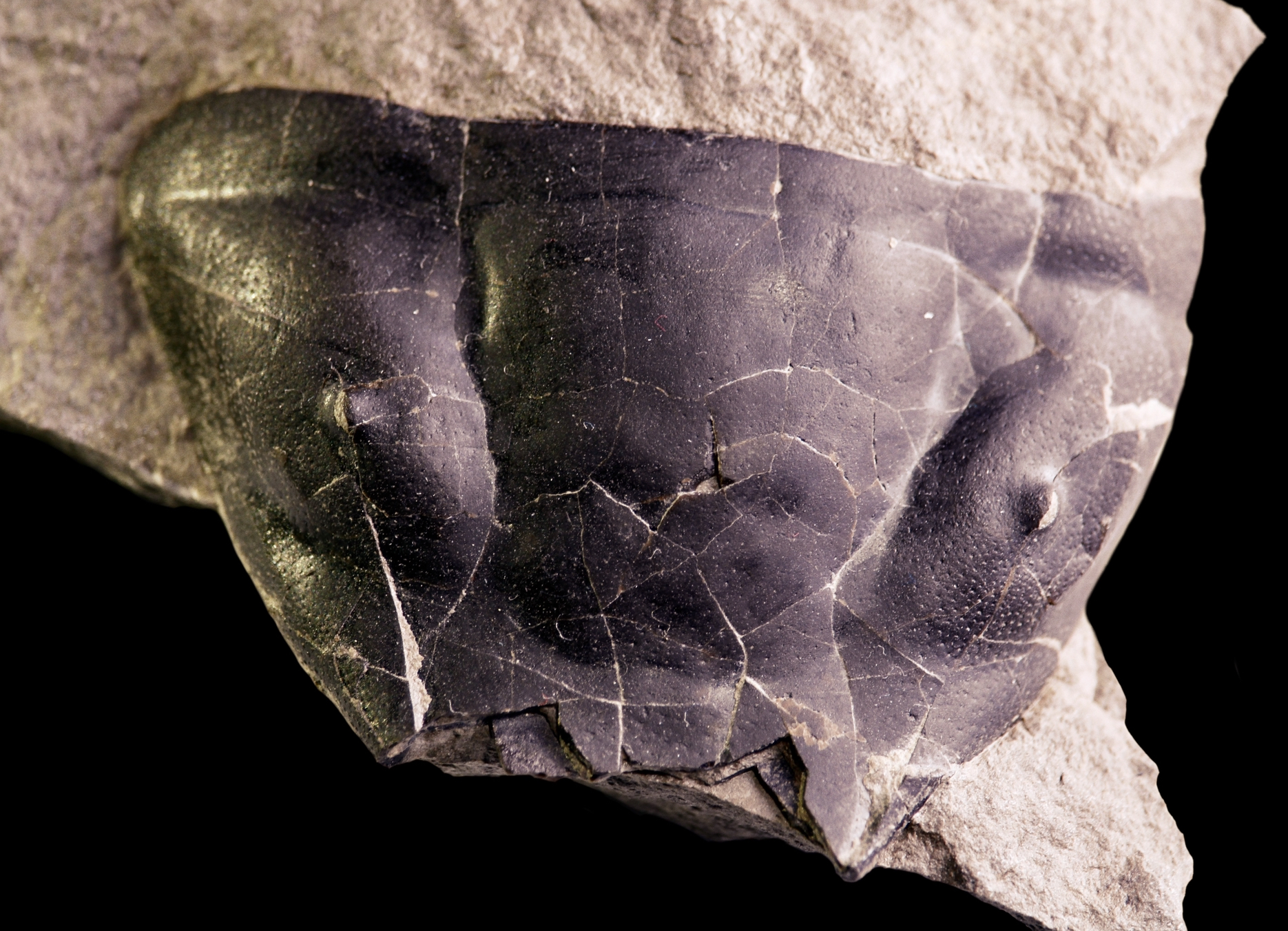
An isolated fossil cephalon from the trilobite Trimerus (Trimerus) delphinocephalus, missing some of the anterior portion. Collected from the Rochester Shale in Canada. Pores for setae are visible marginally.

Trimerus is an extinct genus of trilobite in the family Homalonotidae. Trimerus is one of North America's largest trilobites, reaching over 20 cm (7.9 in) in length. It had a thorax composed of 13 segments with weak trilobation, a large subtriangular head terminating in an expanded rostral plate, a two-pronged hypostome, and a triangular pygidium. It is known from all continents except for Antarctica. Its tiny compound eyes and the shovel-like anterior of the head suggests a burrowing lifestyle, and an exoskeleton marked with many small pores which, in life, probably housed hair-like sensory setae in life, allowed the trilobite to feel which portions of its body were covered with sediment.

== Species ==
In his description of new Homalonotid species from Australia and New Zealand, Andrew Sandford divided Trimerus species into multiple subgenera to better categorize distinct populations. A number of species previously assigned to other genera were included, and a number of species previously assigned to Trimerus were excluded, variously reassigned to the trilobite genera Dipleura (Dipleura dekayi has been frequently included within Trimerus), Digonus, Burmeisteria, and Wenndorfia. The following list is therefore provisional, and other sources may differ. A handful of species also remain undescribed.

Trimerus (Trimerus)
This group is known only from the Silurian (Wenlock to Ludlow).

- Type species Trimerus (Trimerus) delphinocephalus Green, 1832 (USA, Canada, UK)
  - †T. (Trimerus) johannis Salter, 1865 (UK)
  - †T. (Trimerus) cylindricus Salter, 1865 (UK)
  - †T. (Trimerus) harrisoni McCoy, 1876
  - †T. (Trimerus) vomer Chapman, 1912
  - †T. (Trimerus) flexuosus Benedetto and Martel (in Baldis et al., 1976) (Argentina)

Trimerus (Edgillia)
This group is known from the Late Silurian to the Early Devonian. Named after E. D. Gill, for his contributions to Australian paleontology, including naming a number of Homalonotid trilobites.

- Type species †T. (Edgillia) kinglakensis Gill, 1949 (Australia)
  - †T. (Edgillia) vanuxemi Hall, 1859 (USA)
  - †T. (Edgillia?) major Whitfield, 1885 (USA)
  - †T. (Edgillia) mongolicus Tchernycheva, 1937 (Mongolia)
  - †T. (Edgillia) grandis Benedetto and Martel (in Baldis et al., 1976) (Argentina)
  - †T. (Edgillia) jelli Sandford, 2005 (Australia)

Trimerus (Ramiotis)
This group is known only from the Silurian. Named for Otis Rami, the son of the author.

- Type species †T. (Ramiotis) rickardsi Sandford, 2005 (Australia)
  - †T. (Ramiotis) permutus Tomczykowa, 1978 (nom. nov. for T. lobatus Tomczykowa, 1975) (Poland)
  - †T. (Ramiotis) dyaulax Thomas, 1977 (Saudi Arabia)
  - †T. (Ramiotis) salteri Morris, 1988 (nom. nov. for Homalonotus (Koenigia) ludensis Salter, 1865) (UK)
  - †T. (Ramiotis) iani Sandford, 2005 (Australia)
  - †T. (Ramiotis) otisi Sandford, 2005 (Australia)
  - †T. (Ramiotis) thomasi Sandford, 2005 (Australia)
  - †T. (Ramiotis) tomczykowae Sandford, 2005 (Australia)

The following species have not been assigned to a subgenus.

- †T.? acuminatus Tromelin and Lebesconte, 1856
- †T.? lehiri Barrois, 1886
- †T. perceensis Clarke, 1913
- †T. swartzi Ohern and Maynard, 1913
- †T. stelmophorus Busch and Swartz, 1985
