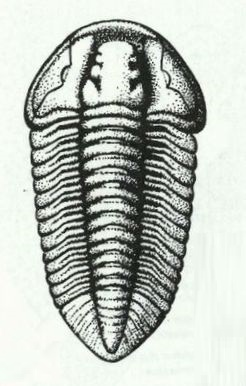
- Flexicalymene caractaci (Salter, 1865) from the Caradoc Series of Shropshire, England.

Scientific classification
- Kingdom: Animalia
- Phylum: Arthropoda
- Clade: †Artiopoda
- Class: †Trilobita
- Order: †Phacopida
- Family: †Calymenidae
- Genus: †Flexicalymene; Shirly, 1936

Species
- See text

= Flexicalymene =

Flexicalymene Temporal range: Middle Ordovician–Early Silurian

Genus of trilobites (fossil)

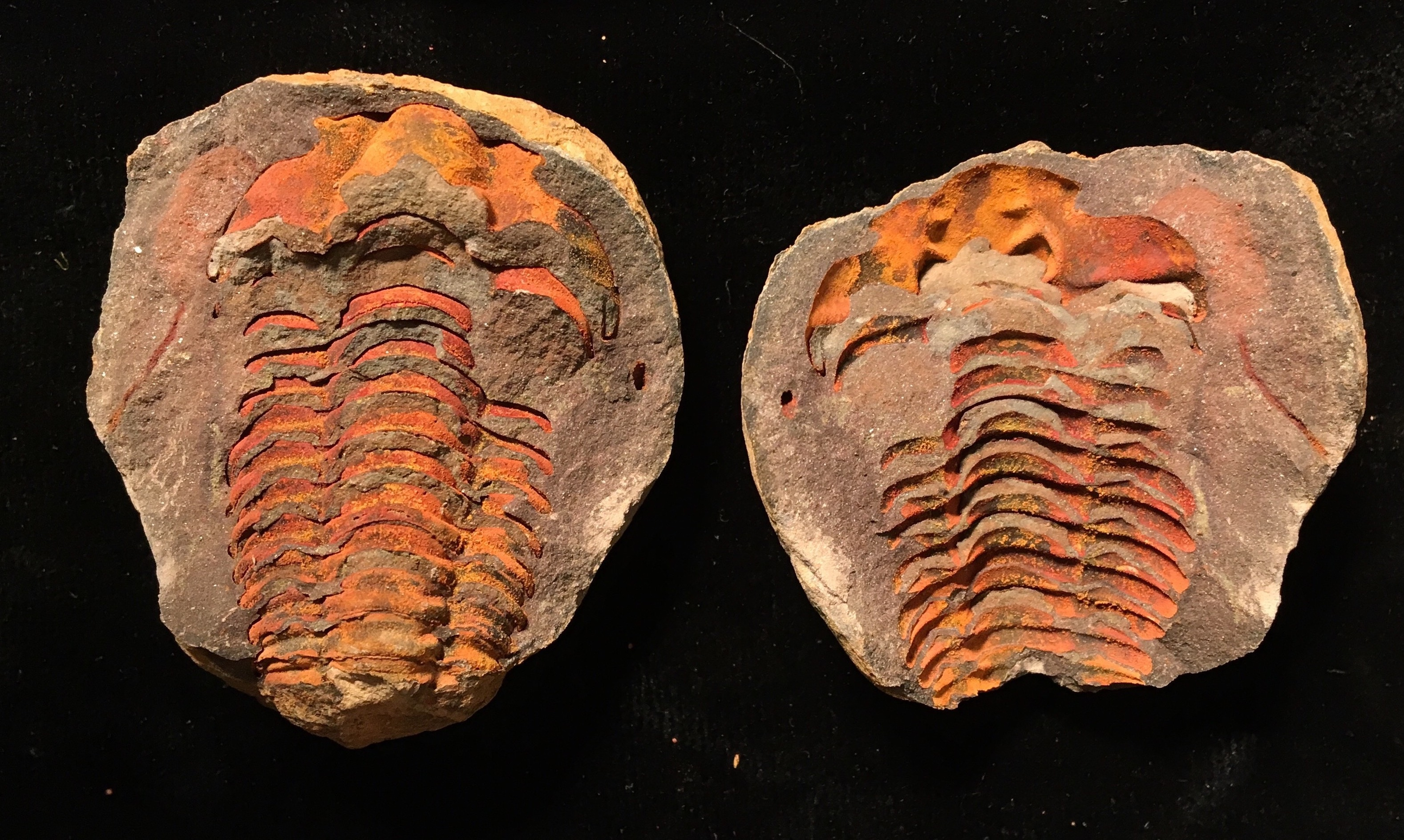
Flexicalymene from Morocco

Flexicalymene is a genus of phacopid trilobites that belongs to the family Calymenidae. They are used as an index fossil in the Ordovician. Ohio and North America are particularly known for being rich with Flexicalymene fossils.

Flexicalymene specimens can be mistaken for Calymene, Gravicalymene, Diacalymene and a few other Calymenina genera.

== Diagnosis ==
"Glabella parabolic to bell-shaped in outline, with three or four lateral lobes and furrows. Lacks buttress(es) from fixed cheek to lateral glabellar lobe(s). Does not have preglabellar field. No distinct crescentic area outside lateral lobe l p. Facial sutures gonatoparian (exceptionally, can be proparian in Flexicalymene). Genal spines absent. Hypostome without discrete protuberance on anterior lobe of median body." (Siveter, 1976, p. 353)

== Species ==
- Flexicalymene caractaci (Salter, 1865) is the type species of the genus. By original designation and by monotypy, Calymene blumenbachii var. Caractaci Salter, 1865 from the Marshbrookian, Dalmanella unguis Biozone (Caradoc Series) of Marshwood Quarry, near Marshbrook, Shropshire, England.
- Flexicalymene cambrensis (Salter, 1865), from the Lower Llandeilo Group of Llan Mill, near Narberth, Dyfed, Wales.
- Flexicalymene acantha Bancroft, 1949, from the Harnage Shale Formation (Harnagian Stage), near Horderley, Shropshire, England.
- Flexicalymene incerta Barrande, 1852, Found only at Lower part of wooded slope above railroad facing Přeštínská Railway Station (Ordovician of Czech Republic). Assigned by Dean (1963).
- Flexicalymene planimarginata (Reed, 1906), from the Lower Longvillian (Caradoc Series) of Ynys Galed, 4 km west of Dolbenmaen, Gwynedd, Wales.
- Flexicalymene cavei Price, 1974, from a Cautleyan marine limestone in the Sholeshook Formation of Moldin, near Llanddowror, Carmarthenshire, Wales.
- Flexicalymene shirleyi Tripp, 1954. From mudstone in the Ardwell Group, Balclatchie Formation (Caradoc Series) of Craighead Quarry near Girvan, Ayrshire, Scotland.
- Flexicalymene scotica Lamont, (1949, p. 315, P1. 18, figs. 6, 7), uppermost Ordovician (Hirnantian), Girvan, Ayrshire, Scotland.
- Flexicalymene verecunda Dean, 1979. From limestone/shale on unsurfaced road leading from Lourdes to Clam Bank Cove in the Long Point Group (Ordovician) and Winterhouse Formation, Port au Port Peninsula, southwestern Newfoundland, Canada.
- Flexicalymene croneisi Roy, 1941. Upper Ordovician, Baffin Island (Ontario).
- Flexicalymene meeki Foerste, 1910. From the Ordovician of Ontario and Quebec in Canada and, Indiana, Kentucky, Michigan, Ohio and Tennessee in the USA.
- Flexicalymene retrorsa Foerste, 1910. Type locality is half a mile above the mouth of Silver creek, east of Dunlapsville, Late Ordovician (Richmondian) Waynesville Formation of Indiana. The species is also recorded from Quebec, Canada and Ohio, Kentucky USA.
- Flexicalymene granulosa (Ohio, Kentucky and Quebec).
- Flexicalymene senaria Conrad, 1841. From the Ordovician of Canada (Ontario, Quebec, Québec), Sweden, United States (Illinois, Iowa, Michigan, Minnesota, Missouri, New York, Tennessee and Virginia.
- Flexicalymene ouzregui Ordovician, Morocco.
- Flexicalymene tazarensis Ordovician, Morocco.

== Gallery ==
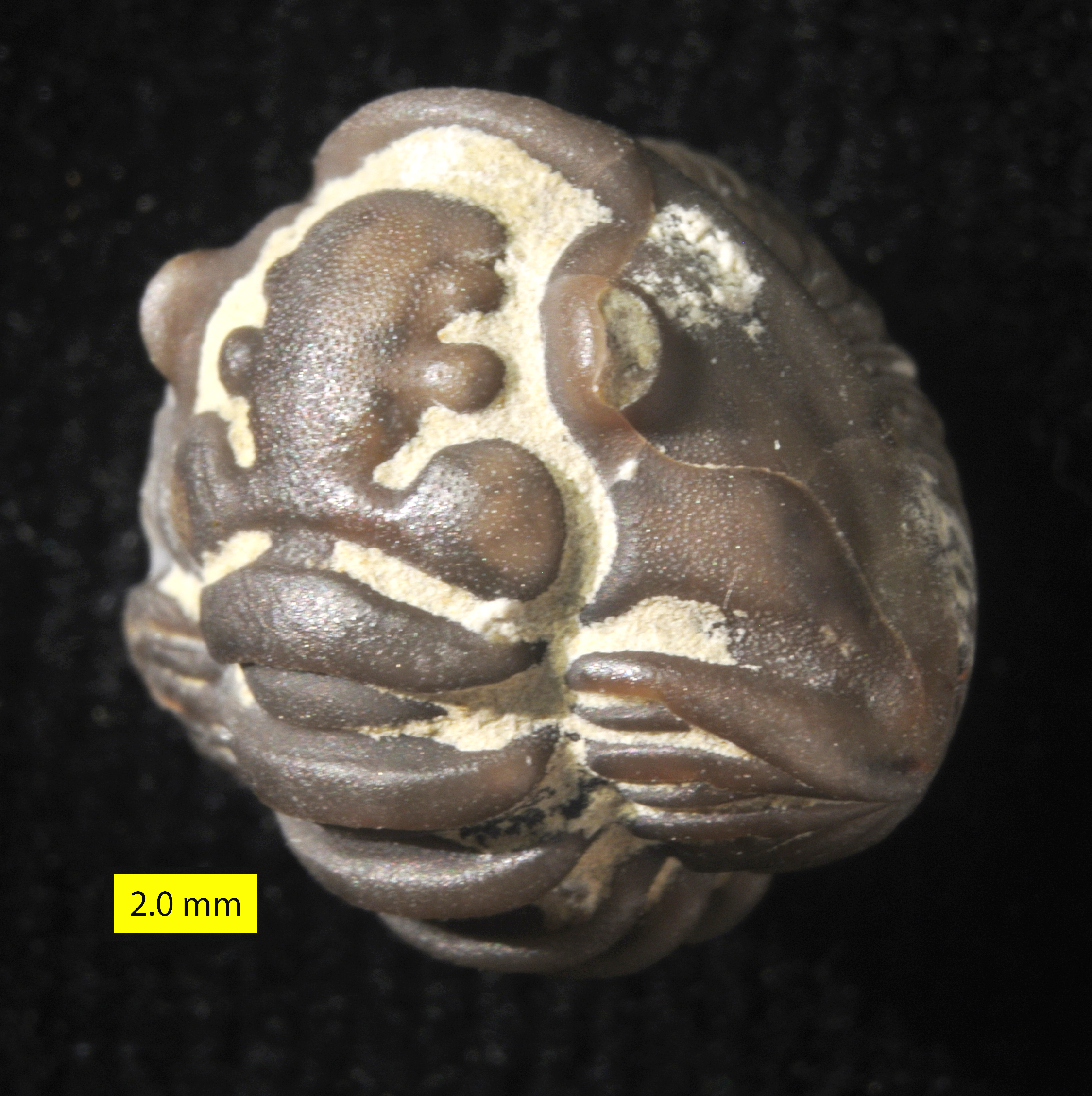
Flexicalymene meeki; Waynesville Formation; Upper Ordovician; Caesar Creek, Ohio.

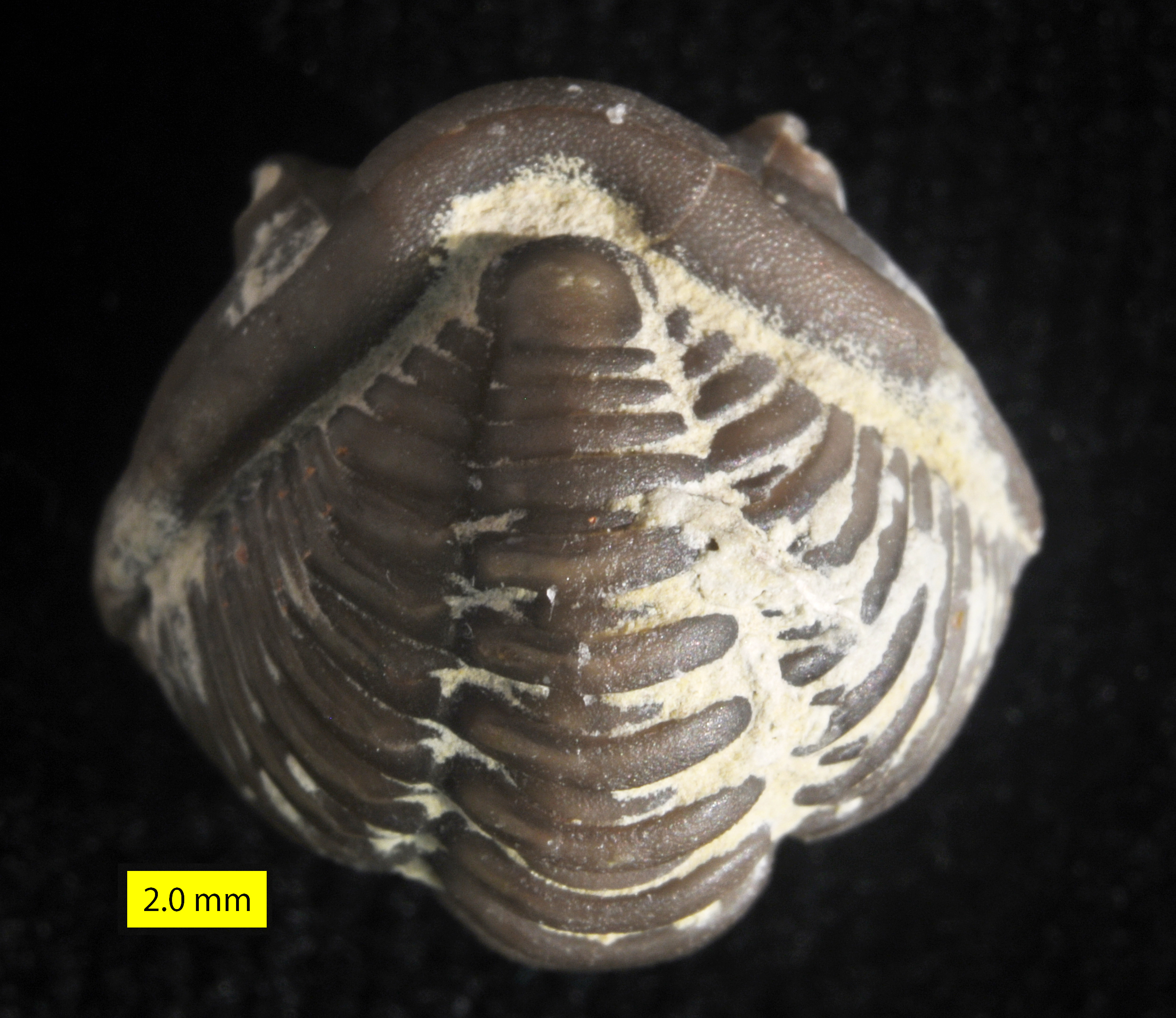
Flexicalymene meeki; Waynesville Formation; Upper Ordovician; Caesar Creek, Ohio.

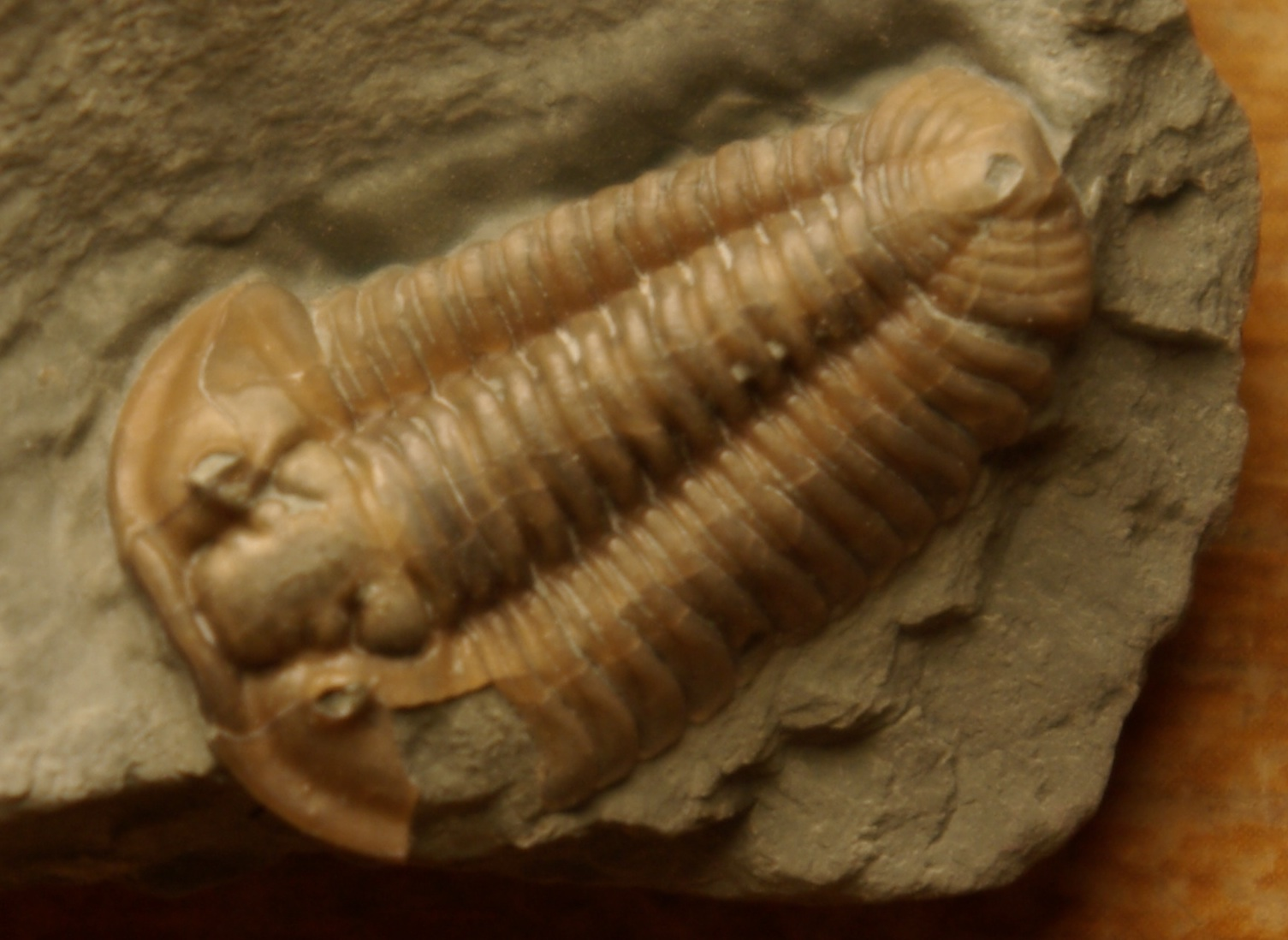
F. meeki

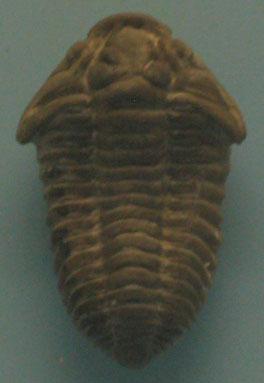
Flexicalymene species on display at State Museum of Pennsylvania. Specimen is approximately 3 cm long

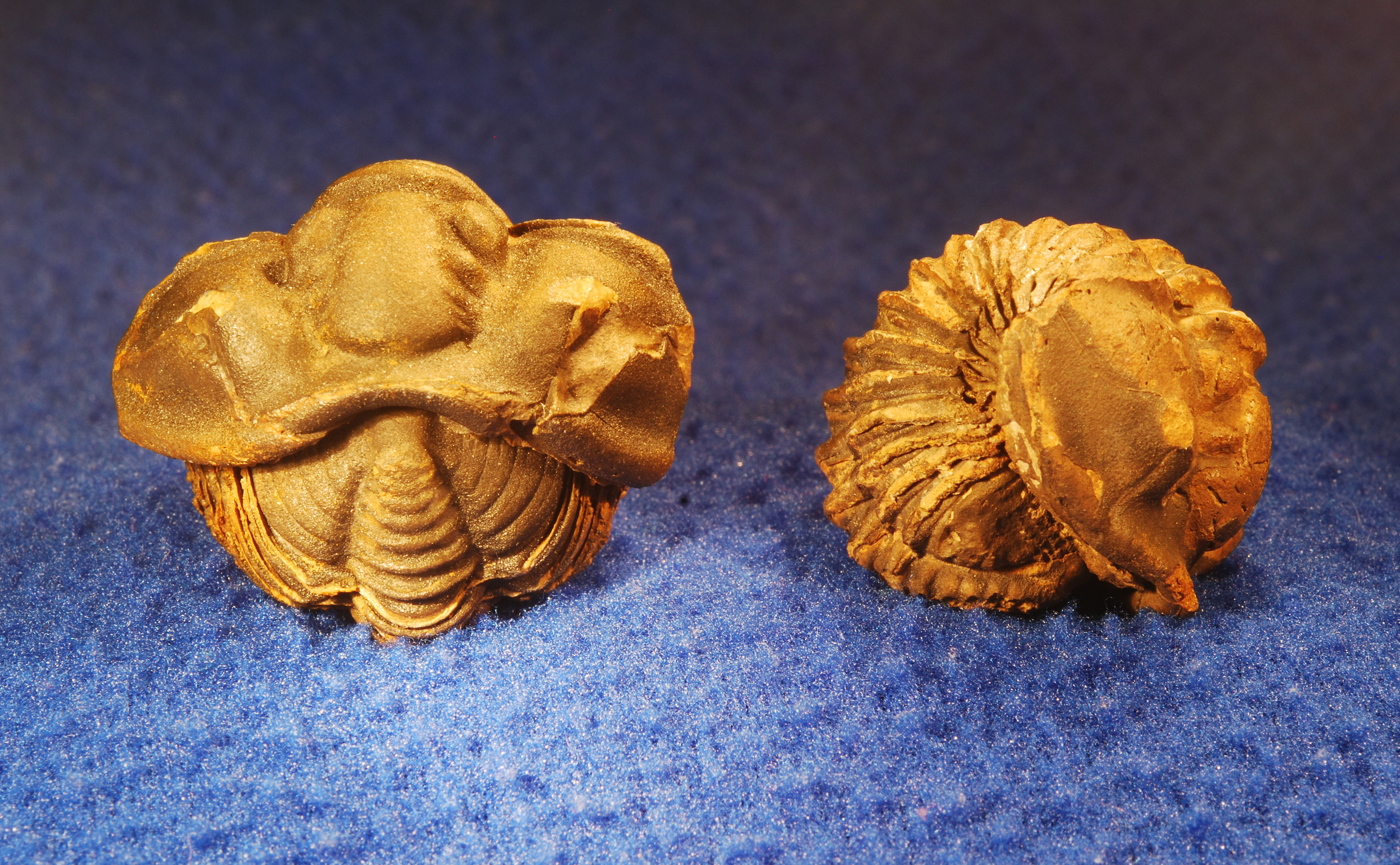
Rolled F. ouzregui; Erfoud, Morocco

F. meeki with an encrusting bryozoan of the genus Parvohallopora from the Waynesville Formation, Indiana, US.
