= Cynwyd Forest Quarry =

Protected area in Clwyd, Wales

Cynwyd Forest Quarry Chwarel Coedwig Cynwyd (Welsh)
- Site of Special Scientific Interest
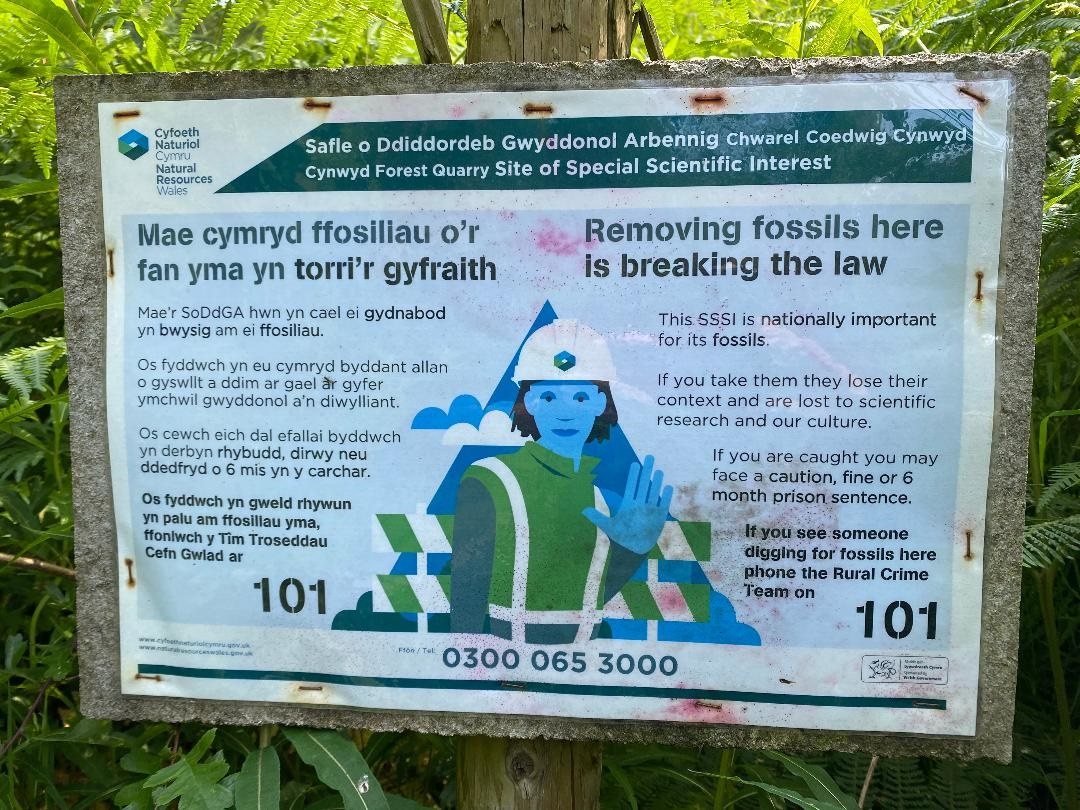

- Location within Denbighshire
- Location of Cynwyd Forest Quarry; Chwarel Coedwig Cynwyd (Welsh).
- Area of search: Denbighshire
- Grid reference: SJ 09135 39969
- Coordinates: 52.94938°N 3.3538238°W
- Interest: Geology/Palaeontology
- Area: 0.18 ha (0.44 acres)
- Notification date: 16 May 1983

Cynwyd Forest Quarry (Welsh: Chwarel Coedwig Cynwyd) is a Site of Special Scientific Interest (SSSI) located aside a track within the Cynwyd Forest near Corwen, Denbighshire, North Wales.

Sometimes referred to in literature as 'Bwlch y Gaseg' and in very close proximity to the area of the same name. It was described by Rushton et al. (2000) and exposes Late Ordovician micaceous siltstones and mudstones of the Dolhir Formation (Ashgill Series, Rawtheyan Stage) which yields a rich shelly (brachiopod) fauna. Trilobites are represented by several genera although the fauna is dominated by Gravicalymene arcuata Price, 1982. Bivalves, bryozoans and various Echinodermata (Crinoids and Cystoids) are also present. Examples of most of the fossils listed below are illustrated and briefly described (or remarked upon) in "Fossils of the Upper Ordovician" by Harper and Owen (Eds.).

== Fossils include ==
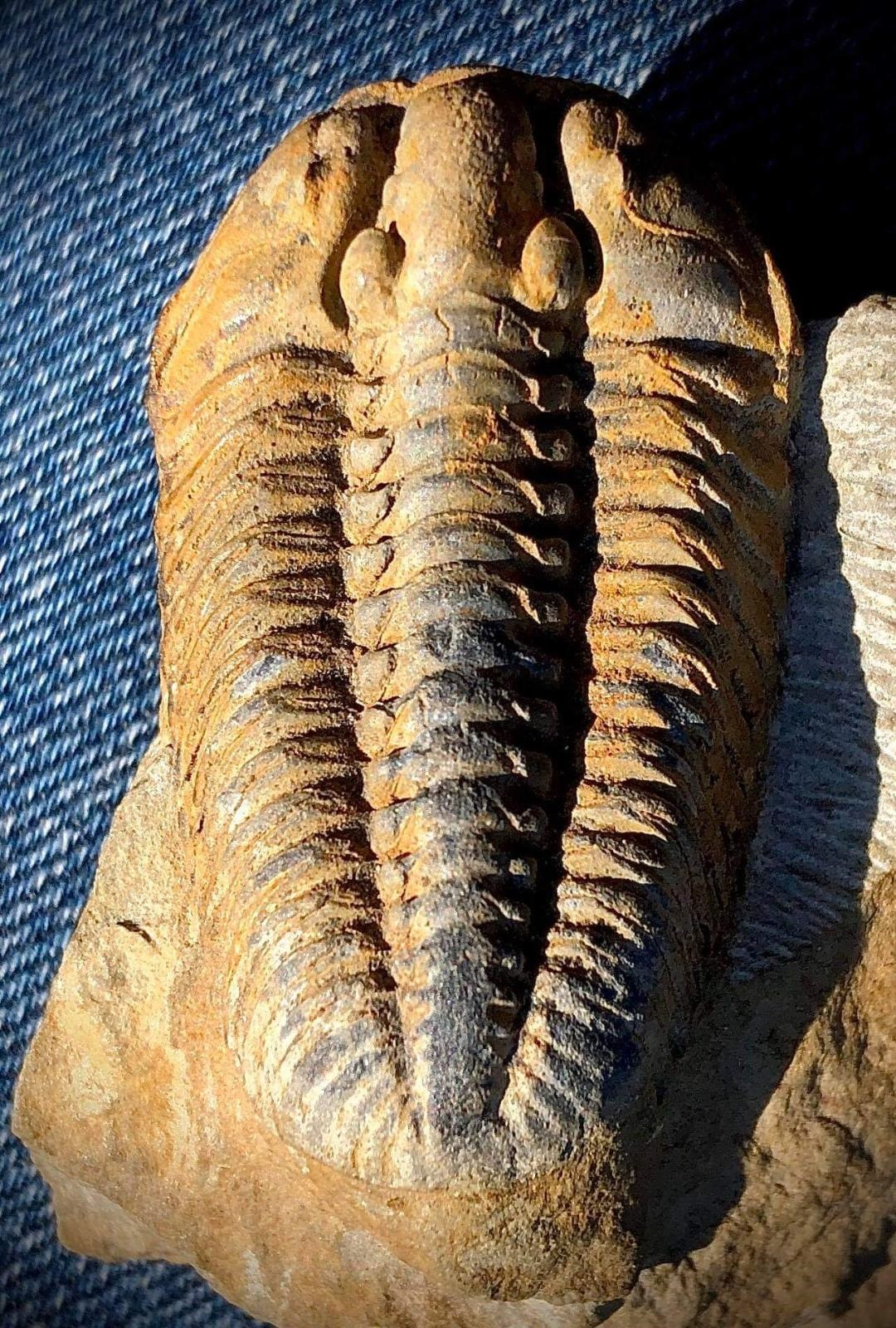
Gravicalymene arcuata Price, 1982.

Bryozoa:

- Pinnatoporella carinata (Etheridge)
- Phylloporina sp.
- Graptodictya sp.

Brachiopoda:

- Leptaena sp.

Cephalopoda:

- Zitteloceras costatum Teichert.

Trilobita:

- Gravicalymene arcuata Price
- Illaenus (Parillaenus) davisii (Salter)
- Remopleurides cf. nicholsoni Reed
- Pseudospaerexochus cf. conformis (Angelin)
- Pseudospaerexochus octolobatus (McCoy)
- Calyptaulax sp.
- Tretaspis sp.

Crinoidea:

- Cupulocorona rugosa Donovan and Paul

Cystoidea

- Regulaecystis inconstans Paul
- Dendrocystoides sp.

== Gallery ==
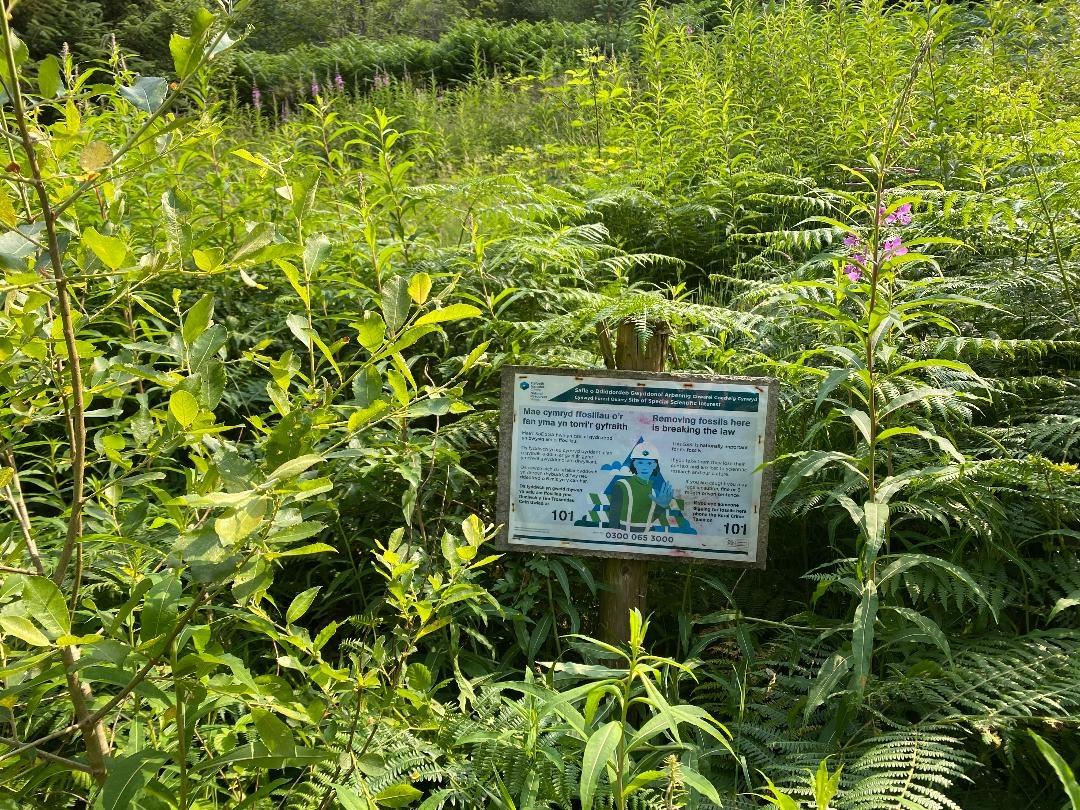
Cynwyd Forest Quarry - photo taken July 20, 2021.

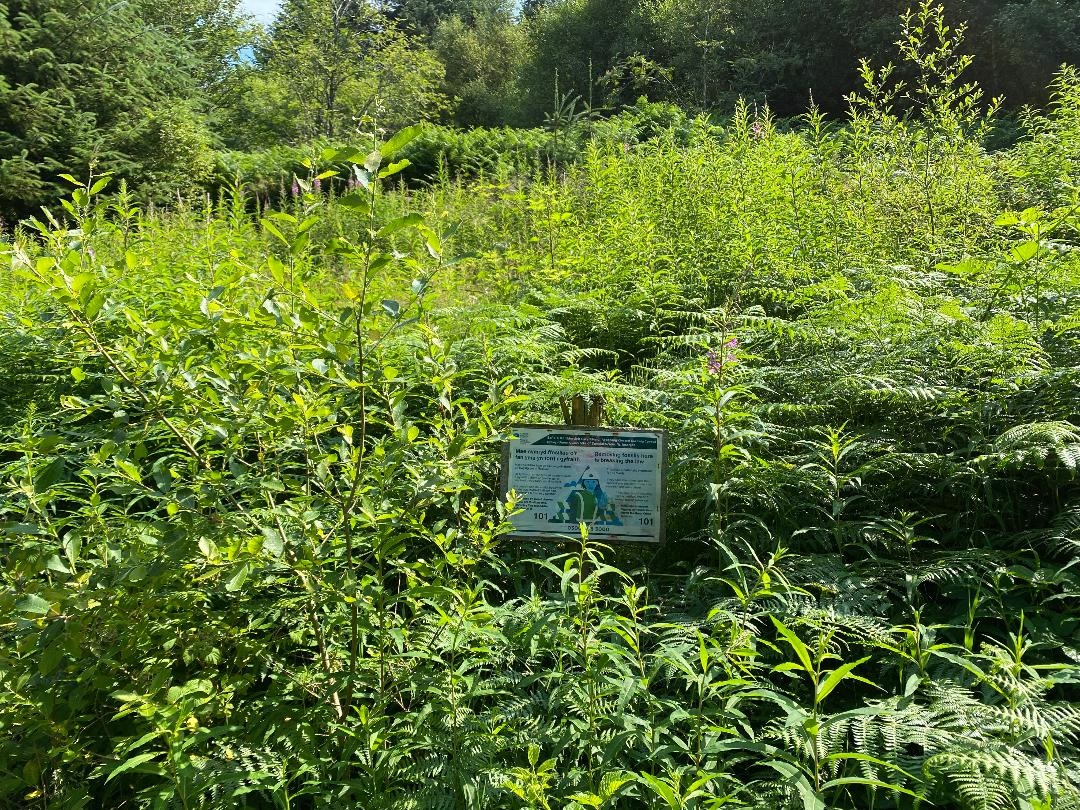
Cynwyd Forest Quarry, 20-July-2021.

== See also ==
- List of Sites of Special Scientific Interest in Clwyd
