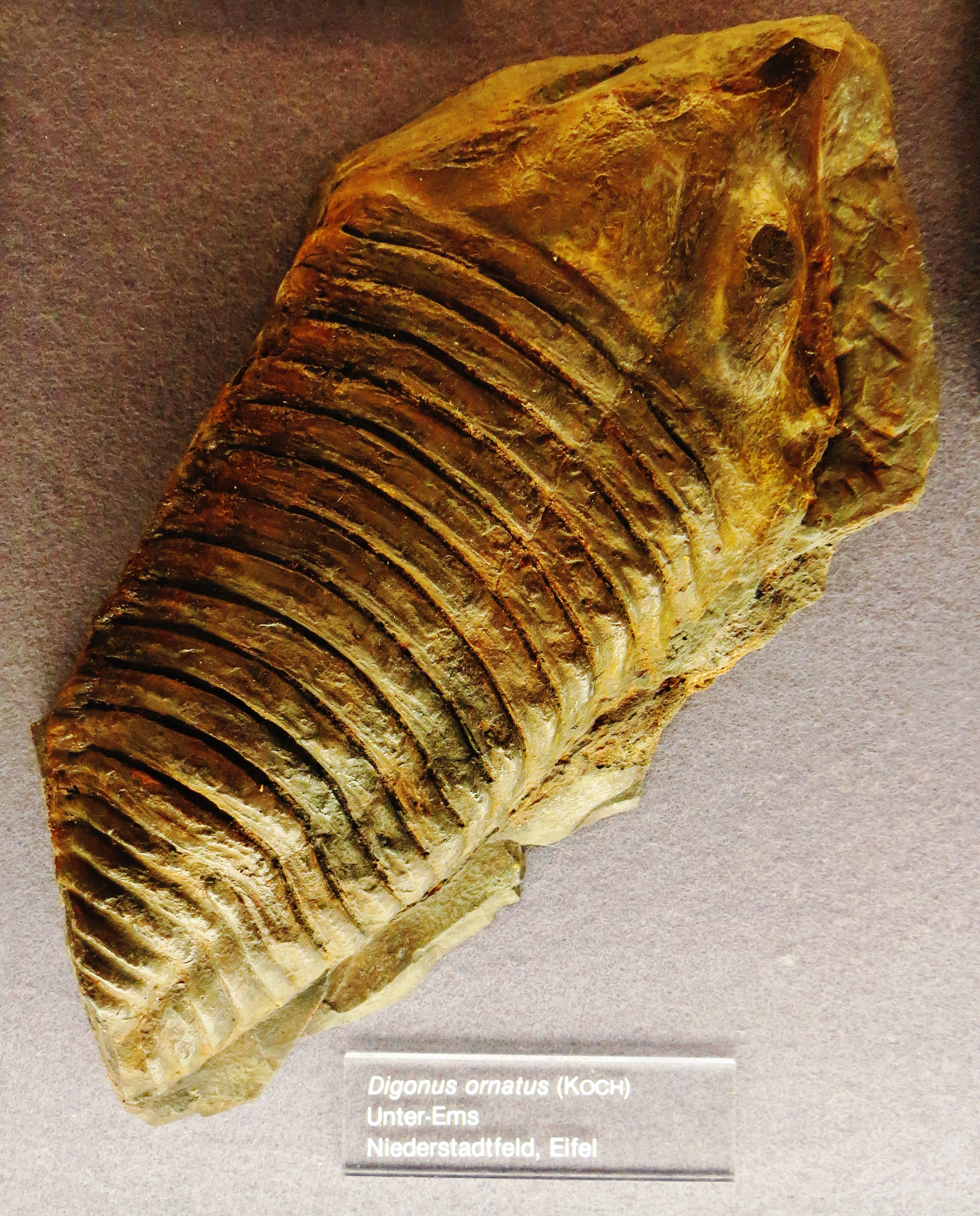
- Digonus ornatus

Scientific classification
- Domain: Eukaryota
- Kingdom: Animalia
- Phylum: Arthropoda
- Class: †Trilobita
- Order: †Phacopida
- Family: †Homalonotidae
- Genus: †Digonus; Gurich, 1909

= Digonus =

Digonus Temporal range: Lower Devonian

Genus of trilobites

Digonus is a genus of trilobites in the order Phacopida, that existed during the lower Devonian in what is now Germany. It was described by Gurich in 1909, and the type species is Digonus gigas, which was originally described under the genus Homalonotus by Roemer in 1843. It also contains the species Digonus accraensis and Digonus noticus (both of which were formerly placed in Burmeisteria), Digonus vialai, and Digonus zemmourensis. The type locality was in the Harz mountains.
