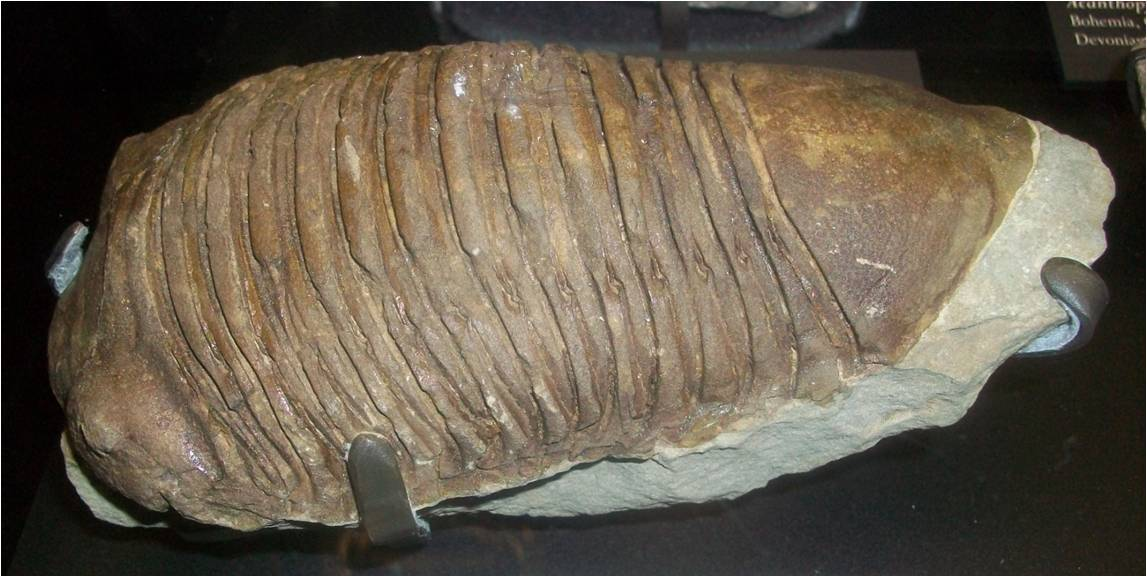
- Homalonotus

Scientific classification
- Kingdom: Animalia
- Phylum: Arthropoda
- Clade: †Artiopoda
- Class: †Trilobita
- Order: †Phacopida
- Suborder: †Calymenina
- Family: †Homalonotidae; Chapman, 1890

= Homalonotidae =

Homalonotidae Temporal range: Ordovician–Middle Devonian

Extinct family of trilobites

Homalonotidae is a family of trilobites that lived from the Ordovician to the Devonian. They are characterised by a shovel-like cephalon (head), and are closely related to the family Calymenidae.

It contains the following genera:

- Arduennella
- Brongniartella
- Burmeisterella
- Burmeisteria
- Digonus
- Dipleura
- Eohomalonotus
- Homalonotus
- Huemacaspis
- Iberocoryphe
- Kerfornella
- Leiostegina
- Parahomalonotus
- Plaesiacomia
- Platycoryphe
- Scabrella
- Trimerus

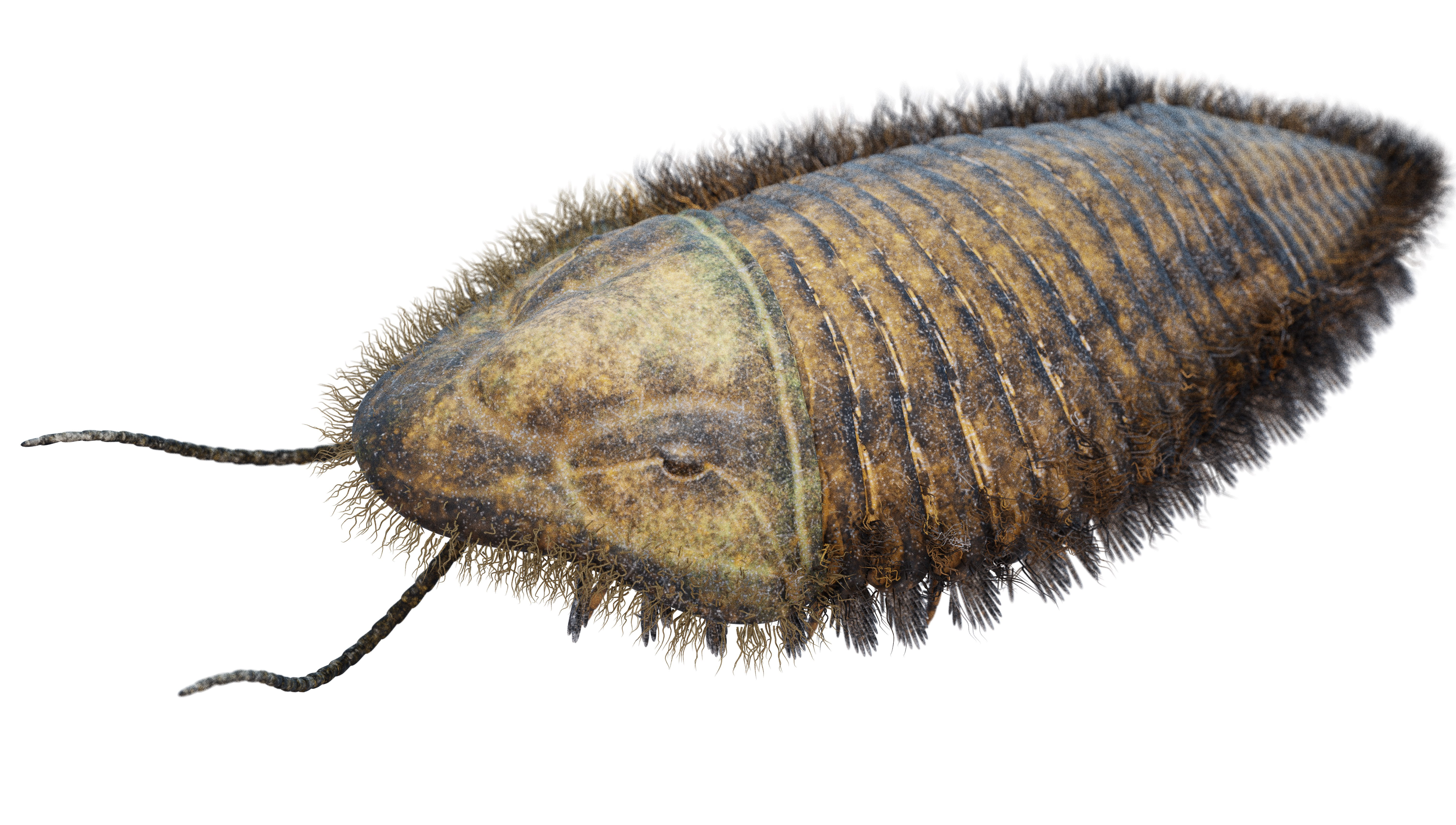
Reconstruction of Trimerus delphinocephalus, the exoskeleton of which was probably fringed with many sensory hairs called Setae.
