= Apocalymene =

Apocalymene Temporal range: Late Silurian–Early Devonian

Scientific classification
- Domain: Eukaryota
- Kingdom: Animalia
- Phylum: Arthropoda
- Class: †Trilobita
- Order: †Phacopida
- Family: †Calymenidae
- Genus: †Apocalymene; Chatterton & Campbell, 1980

Extinct genus of trilobites

Apocalymene is a genus of trilobite in the order Phacopida, which existed in what is now Australia. It was described by Chatterton & Campbell in 1980, and the type species is Apocalymene copinsensis.
