= Calymenesum =

Scientific classification
- Domain: Eukaryota
- Kingdom: Animalia
- Phylum: Arthropoda
- Class: †Trilobita
- Order: †Phacopida
- Family: †Calymenidae
- Genus: †Calymenesum; Kobayashi, 1951

Trilobite in the order Phacopida

Calymenesum is a trilobite in the order Phacopida that existed in what is now China during the middle Ordovician. It was described by Kobayashi in 1951, and the type species is Calymenesum tingi, originally described under the genus Calymene by Sun in 1931. The species was described from the Shistzupu Formation in Guizhou, China.
