= Burmeisterella =

Scientific classification
- Domain: Eukaryota
- Kingdom: Animalia
- Phylum: Arthropoda
- Class: †Trilobita
- Order: †Phacopida
- Family: †Homalonotidae
- Genus: †Burmeisterella (Reed, 1918)

Extinct genus of trilobites

Burmeisterella is a genus of trilobites in the order Phacopida. It was described by Reed in 1918.

== Species ==
- Burmeisterella annata (Burmeister, 1843)
- Burmeisterella armata
  - Burmeisterella armata armata (Burmeister, 1843)
  - Burmeisterella armata westrami (Dohm, 1909)
- Burmeisterella braziliensis Da Gloria Pipes De Carvalho, 2005
- Burmeisterella delattrei (Pillet & Waterlot, 1983) (= Burmeisterella vixarmata Wenndorf, 1990 according to Van Viersen & Taghon, 2020)
- Burmeisterella neoelongata Basse, 2007 (replacement name for elongatus Salter, 1865)
- Burmeisterella quadrispinosa Wenndorf, 1990
- Burmeisterella subarmata (Koch, 1883)
