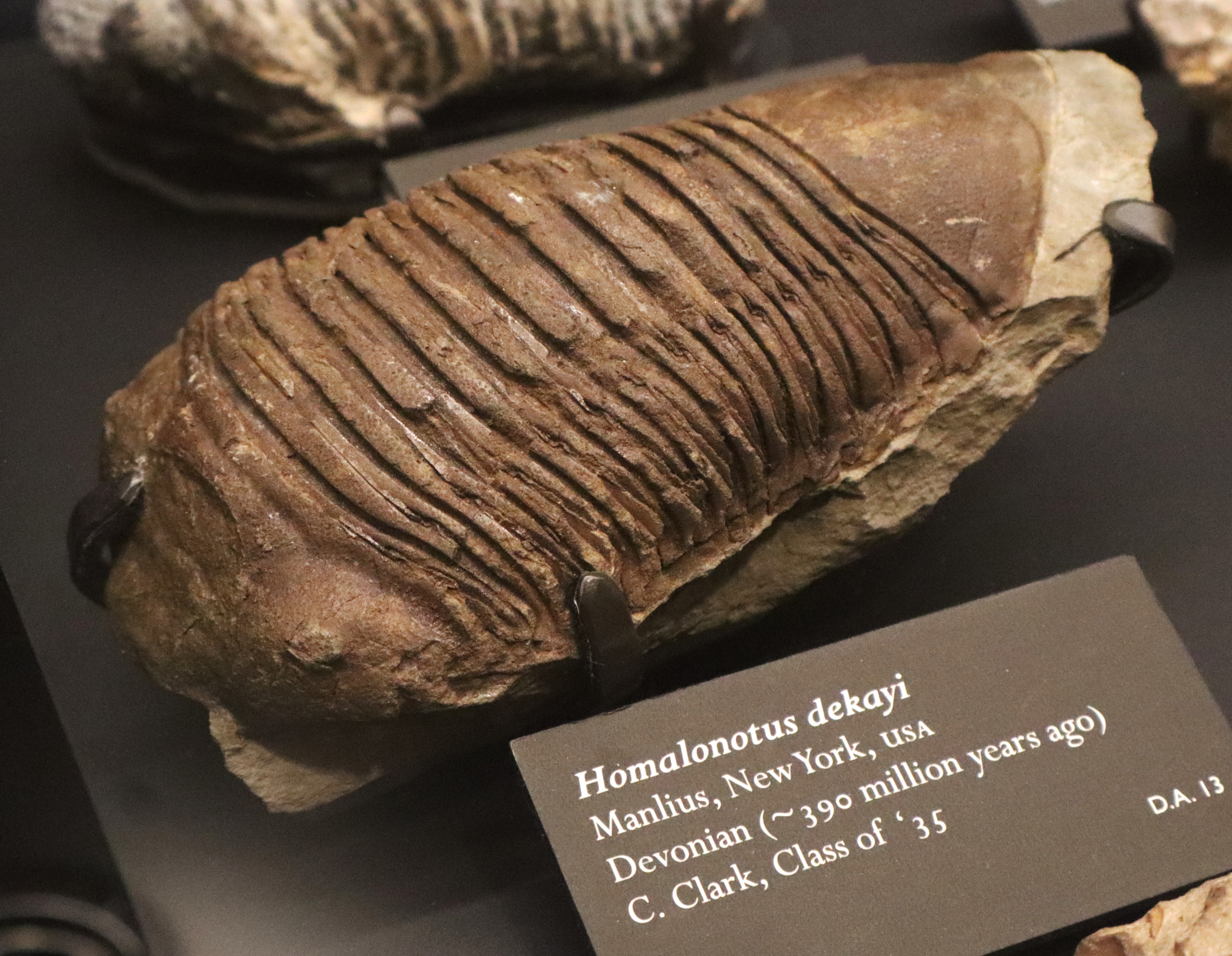
- H. dekayi, Beneski Museum of Natural History

Scientific classification
- Kingdom: Animalia
- Phylum: Arthropoda
- Clade: †Artiopoda
- Class: †Trilobita
- Order: †Phacopida
- Family: †Homalonotidae
- Genus: †Homalonotus; König, 1825, non Homalonotus Agassiz, 1846 = Homalinotus Schoenherr 1826, a beetle of uncertain affiliation

Species
- H. armatus; H. dekayi; H. delphinocephalus; H. expansus; H. platynotus; H. rhinotropis; H. roemeri

= Homalonotus =

Homalonotus Temporal range: Late Ordovician-Middle Devonian ~460–383 Ma

Homalonotus is an extinct genus of trilobites in the order Phacopida. It contains several species, including H. armatus and H. roemeri. It is closely related to other trilobites such as Arduennella and Dipleura..

== Distribution ==
Fossils of Homalonotus have been found in:

Ordovician

France, and the United Kingdom

Silurian

Canada (Nova Scotia), Poland, Sweden (Gotland, Västergötland), the United Kingdom, and the United States (New York)

Devonian

Algeria, Bolivia, Brazil, Uruguay, Colombia (Floresta Formation, Altiplano Cundiboyacense), France, Morocco, New Zealand, Poland, and Ukraine
