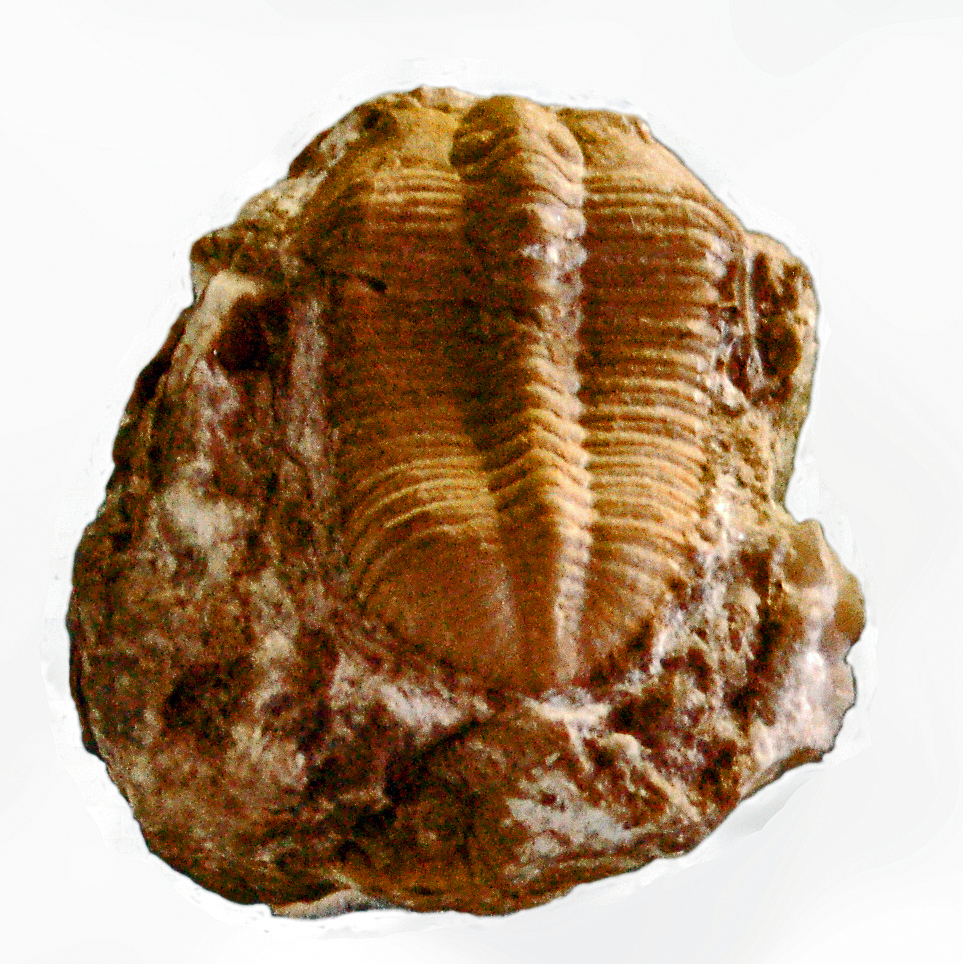
- Metacalymene baylei from Beroun, Dlauhà, Prague Basin Czech Republic at the National Museum (Prague)

Scientific classification
- Domain: Eukaryota
- Kingdom: Animalia
- Phylum: Arthropoda
- Class: †Trilobita
- Order: †Phacopida
- Family: †Calymenidae
- Genus: †Metacalymene; Kegel, 1927

= Metacalymene =

Metacalymene Temporal range: Ludfordian–Pridoli

Genus of trilobites

Metacalymene is a genus of trilobites in the order Phacopida, family Calymenidae. This genus is considered monotypic, containing only the type species:

- Metacalymene baylei Barrande, 1846.

These trilobites were nektobenthic detritivore. They lived in the Silurian period in the Ludlow epoch, from 422.9 ± 1.5 to 418.7 ± 2.8 million years ago.

== Distribution ==
Silurian of the Czech Republic.
