= Vietnamia =

Vietnamia Temporal range: Late Ordovician

Scientific classification
- Domain: Eukaryota
- Kingdom: Animalia
- Phylum: Arthropoda
- Class: †Trilobita
- Order: †Phacopida
- Family: †Calymenidae
- Genus: †Vietnamia; Kobayashi, 1960

Fossil genus of trilobites

Vietnamia is a genus of trilobites. A new species, V. yushanensis, was described from the late Ordovician of China by Dong-Chan Lee in 2011. It is also found in the U.A.E.
