= Cromus =

Scientific classification
- Domain: Eukaryota
- Kingdom: Animalia
- Phylum: Arthropoda
- Class: †Trilobita
- Order: †Phacopida
- Family: †Encrinuridae
- Genus: †Cromus; Barrande, 1852

Species
- C. intercostatus; C. canorus

Genus of trilobites

Cromus is a genus of phacopid trilobites in the family Encrinuridae, that existed during the upper Silurian in what is now the Czech Republic. The genus was described by Barrande in 1852, and the type species is C. intercostatus. It also contains the species C. canorus.

The type specimen was described from the Kopanina Formation.
