= Burmeisteria =

Scientific classification
- Domain: Eukaryota
- Kingdom: Animalia
- Phylum: Arthropoda
- Class: †Trilobita
- Order: †Phacopida
- Family: †Homalonotidae
- Genus: †Burmeisteria; Salter, 1865

Genus of trilobites

Burmeisteria is a genus of trilobites in the order Phacopida (family Homalonotidae) that existed during the lower Devonian in what is now South Africa. It was described by Salter in 1865, and the type species is Burmeisteria herschelii, which was originally described under the genus Homalonotus by Murchison in 1839. It also contains the species B. accraensis, B. acuminata, and B. noticus. The type locality was the Bokkeveld Group.
