= Calymenella =

Calymenella Temporal range: Upper Ordovician–Wenlock

Scientific classification
- Domain: Eukaryota
- Kingdom: Animalia
- Phylum: Arthropoda
- Class: †Trilobita
- Order: †Phacopida
- Family: †Calymenidae
- Genus: †Calymenella; Bergeron, 1890

Genus of trilobites

Calymenella is a genus of trilobites in the order Phacopida, which existed in what is now France during the upper Ordovician. It was described by Bergeron in 1890, and the type species is Calymenella boisseli. The species was described from the Glauzy Formation in the Montagne Noire mountain range.
