= Arduennella =

Scientific classification
- Domain: Eukaryota
- Kingdom: Animalia
- Phylum: Arthropoda
- Class: †Trilobita
- Order: †Phacopida
- Family: †Homalonotidae
- Genus: †Arduennella; Wenndorf, 1990

Arduennella is a Devonian homalonotid genus of trilobite in the order Phacopida, which existed in what is now Belgium, Germany, Morocco and Romania. It was described by Wenndorf in 1990, and the type species is Arduennella maillieuxi, which was originally described as Homalonotus maillieuxi by Asselberghs in 1923.
