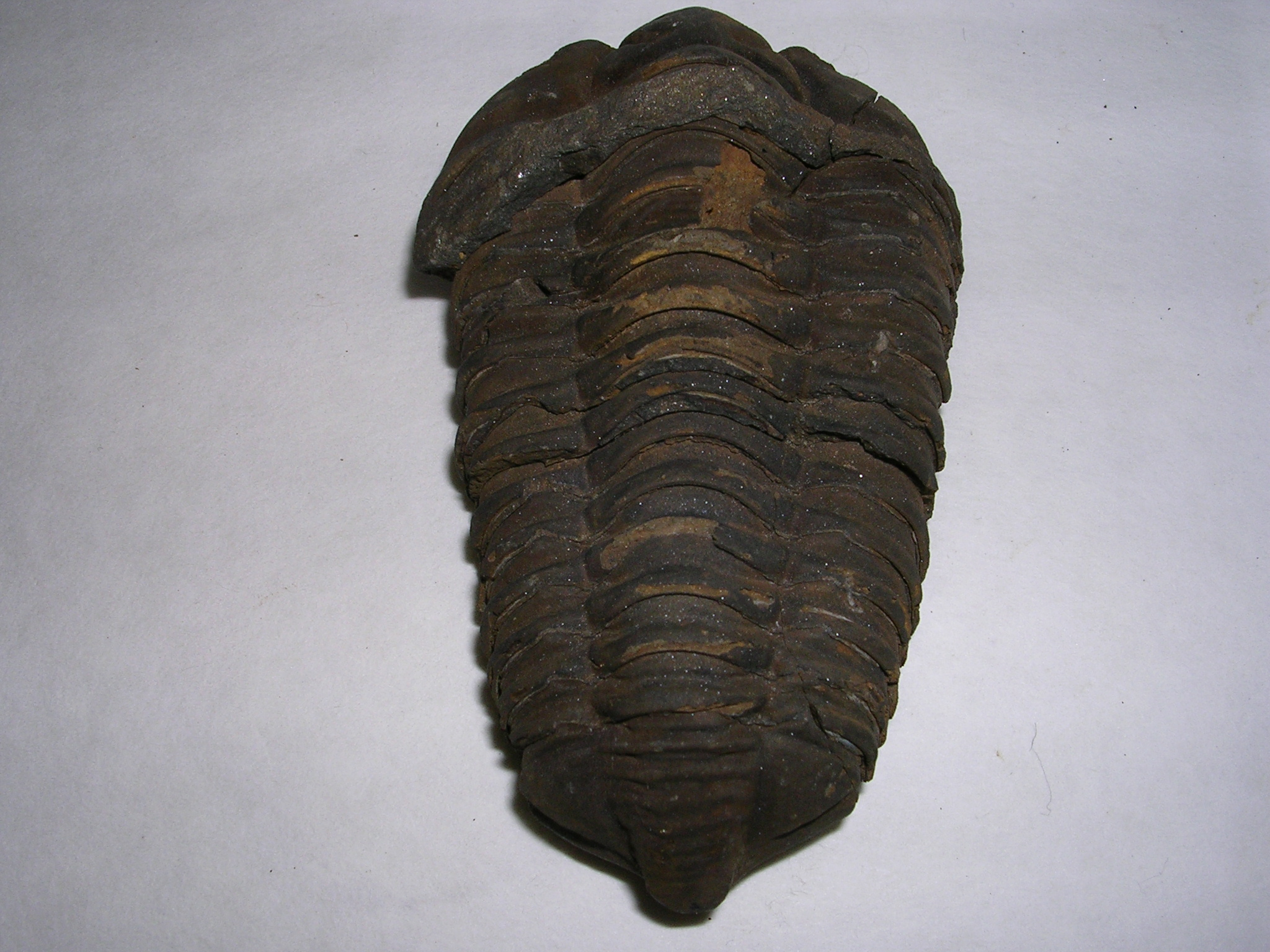
- Colpocoryphe grandis (Calymenidae)

Scientific classification
- Kingdom: Animalia
- Phylum: Arthropoda
- Clade: †Artiopoda
- Class: †Trilobita
- Order: †Phacopida
- Suborder: †Calymenina

Families
- Bathycheilidae; Bavarillidae; Calymenidae; Homalonotidae; Pharostomatidae

= Calymenina =

Calymenina Temporal range: Ordovician–Middle Devonian

Suborder of Trilobites

Calymenina is a suborder of the trilobite order Phacopida.
