= Arcticalymene =

Arcticalymene Temporal range: Early Ludlow-Late Wenlock

Scientific classification
- Kingdom: Animalia
- Phylum: Arthropoda
- Clade: †Artiopoda
- Class: †Trilobita
- Order: †Phacopida
- Family: †Calymenidae
- Genus: †Arcticalymene; Adrain and Edgecombe, 1997

Type species
- Arcticalymene viciousi Adrain and Edgecombe, 1997

Species
- A. australis Sandford, 2000; A. cooki Adrain and Edgecombe, 1997; A. jonesi Adrain and Edgecombe, 1997; A. matlocki Adrain and Edgecombe, 1997; A. rotteni Adrain and Edgecombe, 1997; A. viciousi Adrain and Edgecombe, 1997

Extinct genus of trilobites

Arcticalymene is a genus of trilobites found in Silurian-aged marine strata of Arctic Canada and Central Victoria, Australia.

== Species ==
The Canadian species are named after each of the Sex Pistols: A. cooki (Paul Cook), A. jonesi (Steve Jones), A. matlocki (Glen Matlock), A. rotteni (Johnny Rotten) and A. viciousi (Sid Vicious), all named by Adrain and Edgecombe in 1997.

== See also ==
- List of organisms named after famous people (born 1950–1974)
