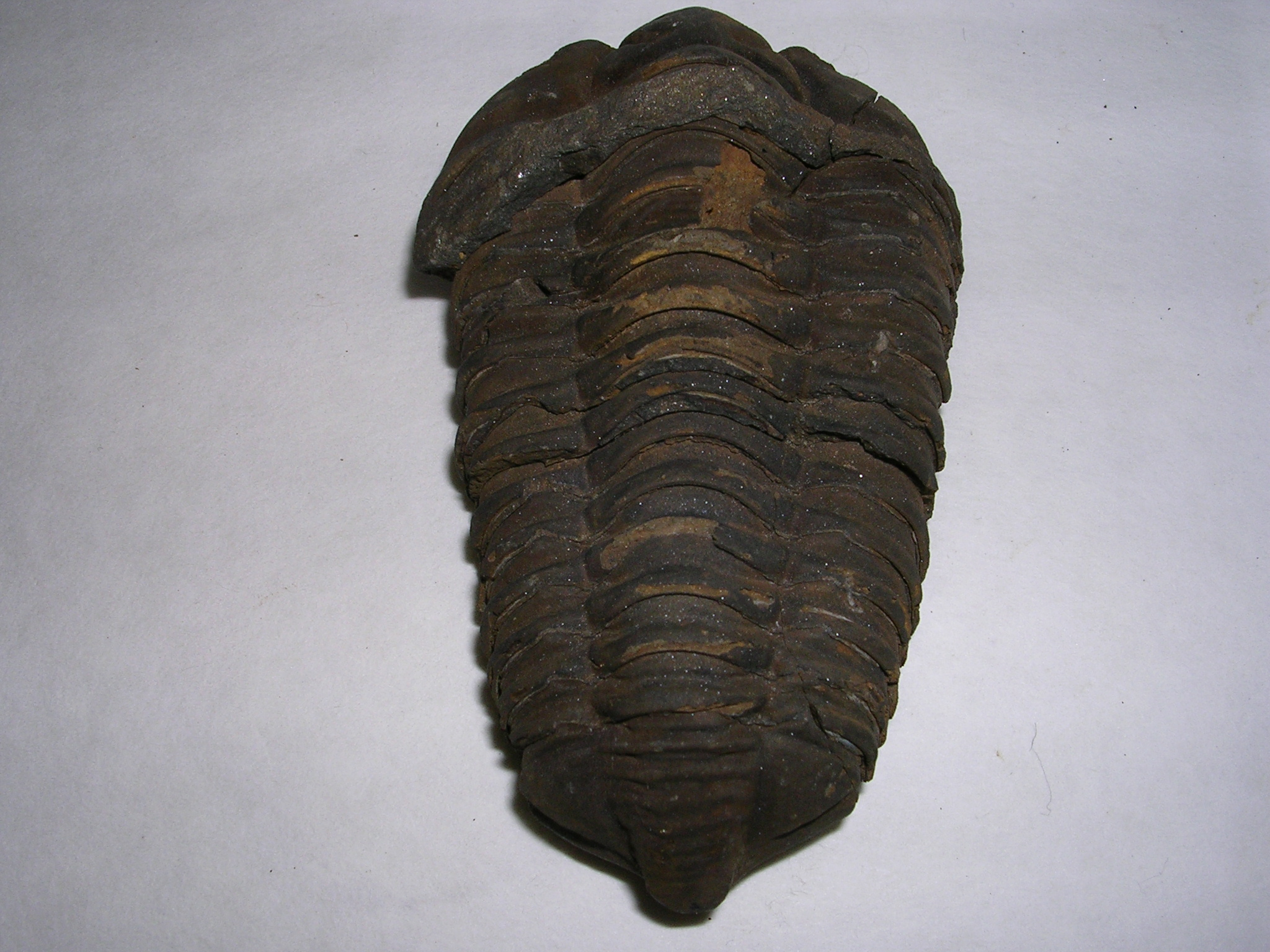
- Colpocoryphe grandis

Scientific classification
- Domain: Eukaryota
- Kingdom: Animalia
- Phylum: Arthropoda
- Class: †Trilobita
- Order: †Phacopida
- Family: †Calymenidae
- Genus: †Colpocoryphe; Novak & Perner, 1918

Species
- †Colpocoryphe grandis †Colpocoryphe rouaulti †Colpocoryphe bohemica

= Colpocoryphe =

Colpocoryphe Temporal range: Early Ordovician–Middle Ordovician

Genus of trilobites

Colpocoryphe is a genus of trilobites in the family Calymenidae.

== Morphology ==
- Convex Cephalon
- Trapezoidal glabellae, frequently distinctly furrowed and surelevated compared to the axis.
- Dorsal furrows slightly convergent forwardly with almost linear anterior parts.

Broad dorsal furrows, deep and not well defined.
3, rather 4, well defined lateral furrows

- Librigenæ without lateral area or lateral furrow.
- Preglabellar field very short, downward oriented.
- Inflated occipital ring with smooth lateral ends.
- Occipital furrow broad and deep.
- Eye ridges rather weak.
- Anterior cephalic notch marked, with frequently parallel edges.
- Thorax : Strongly convex axis.
- Triangular Pygidium
- Convex axis, with segmentation well defined.
- 6 - 8 axial rings.
- Pleurae with deep border furrows.
- Axis extending nearly to posterior margin (large posterior terminal piece), connected to

it by short postaxial ridge.

- Pleural fields behind articulating half-ribs nearly smooth, with 2 - 3 very indistinct ribs.

Wide border distinctly set off by marked change in convexity.
