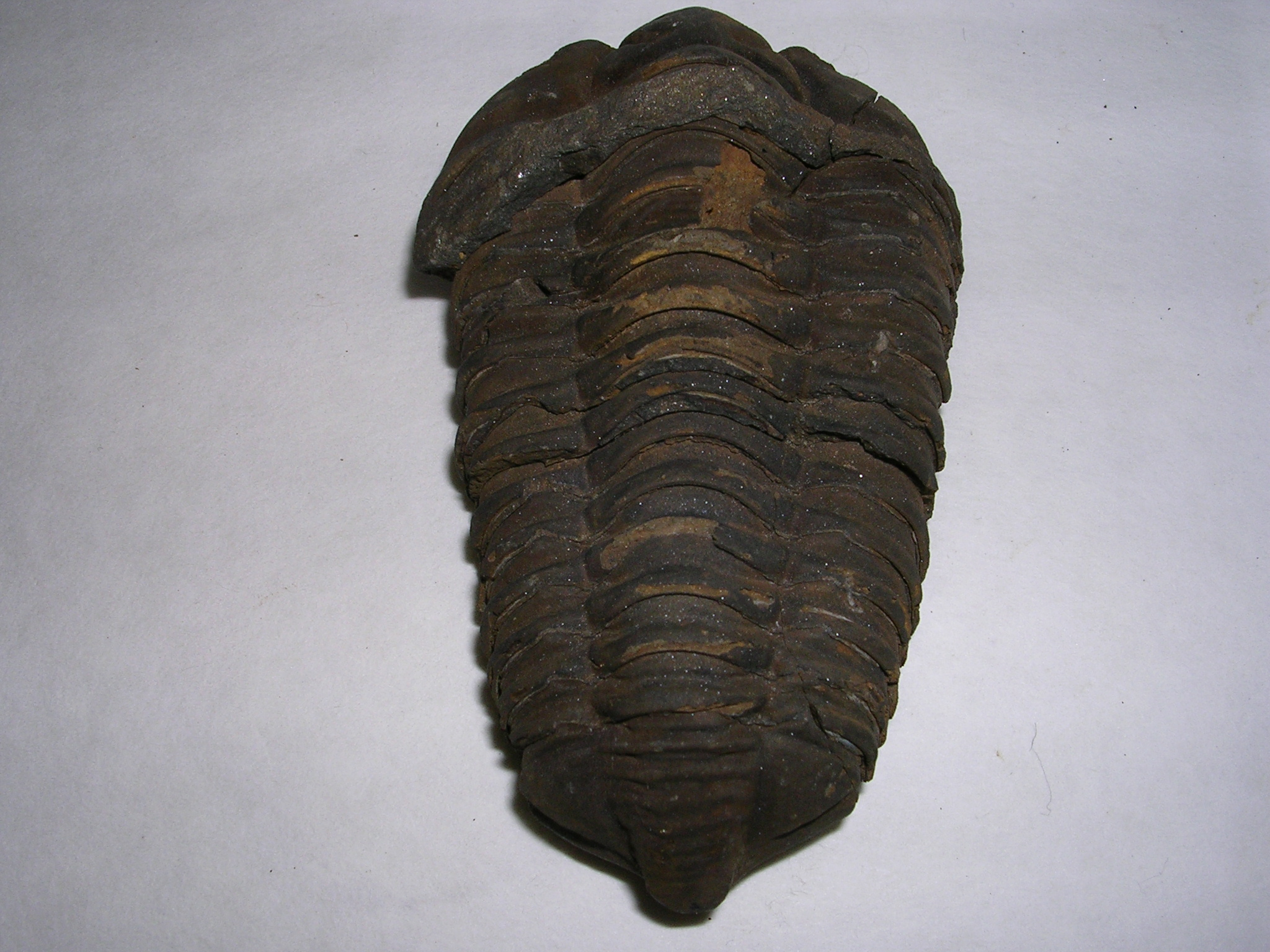
- Colpocoryphe grandis

Scientific classification
- Kingdom: Animalia
- Phylum: Arthropoda
- Clade: †Artiopoda
- Class: †Trilobita
- Order: †Phacopida
- Suborder: †Calymenina
- Family: †Calymenidae; Milne-Edwards, 1840

= Calymenidae =

Extinct family of trilobites

Calymenidae is a family of trilobites, containing the following genera:

- Alcymene
- Apocalymene
- Arcticalymene
- Calymene
- Calymenella
- Calymenesum
- Colpocoryphe
- Dekalymene
- Diacalymene
- Flexicalymene
- Gravicalymene
- Limbocalymene
- Linguocalymene
- Liocalymene
- Metacalymene
- Neseuretinus
- Neseuretus
- Nipponocalymene
- Onnicalymene
- Papillicalymene
- Paracalymene
- Platycalymene
- Pradoella
- Protocalymene
- Reacalymene
- Reedocalymene
- Salterocoryphe
- Sarrabesia
- Spathacalymene
- Sthenarocalymene
- Tapinocalymene
- Thelecalymene
- Vietnamia
