= Dolhir Formation =

Geologic formation in Wales

- Stratigraphic range: Ashgill Series
- Type: Formation
- Underlies: Mudstones of the Fron Frys Formation.
- Overlies: Unconformable on various Caradoc Formations.
- Thickness: 490 metres. Lateral variations, 320 - 490 metres.

Location
- Region: Wales
- Country: United Kingdom
- Extent: Not defined

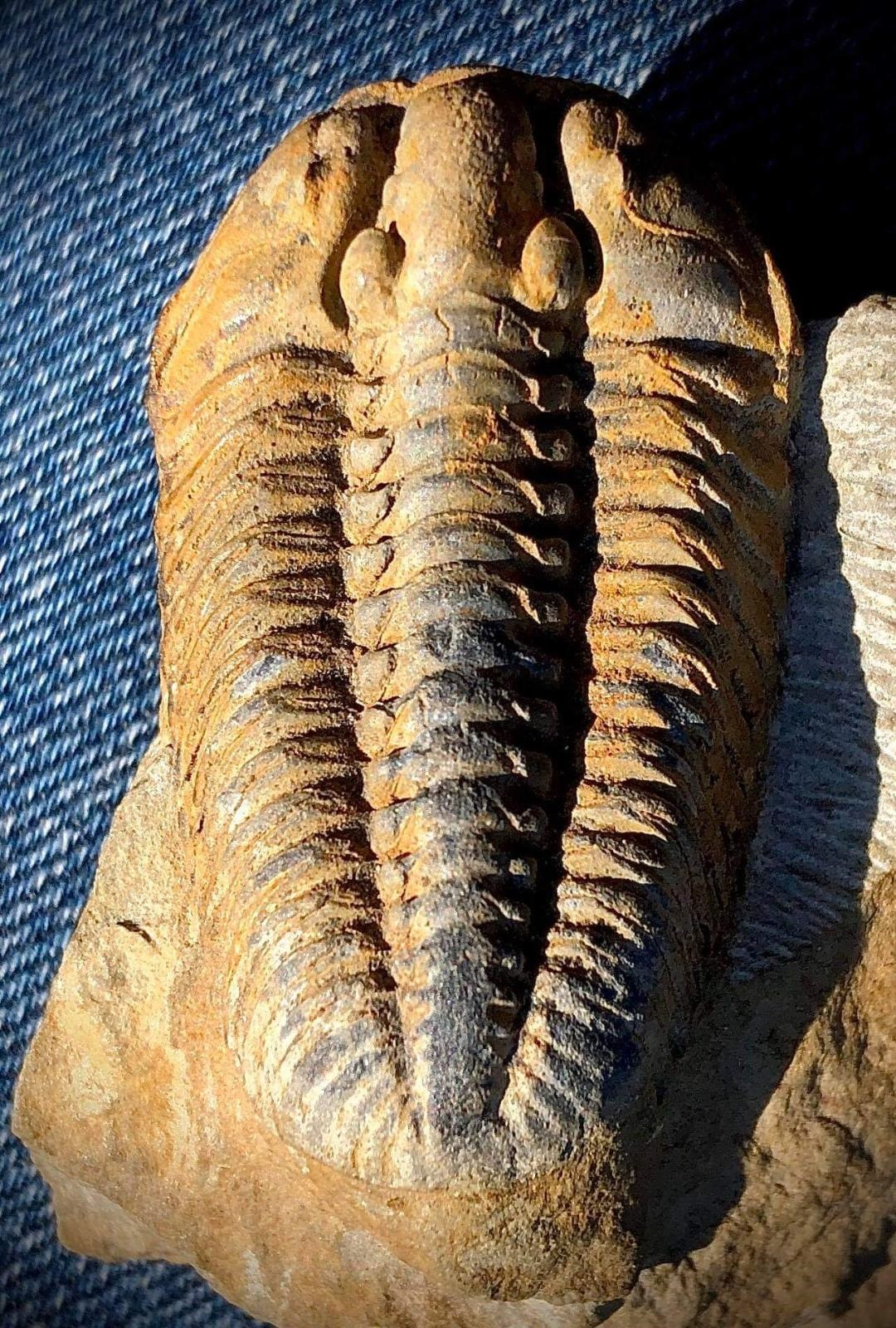
Gravicalymene arcuata Price, 1982, Rawtheyan Stage, Dolhir Formation, Cynwyd Forest, near Corwen, Wales

The Dolhir Formation is a geologic formation in Wales. It preserves fossils dated to the Ordovician period.

== See also ==
- List of fossiliferous stratigraphic units in Wales
