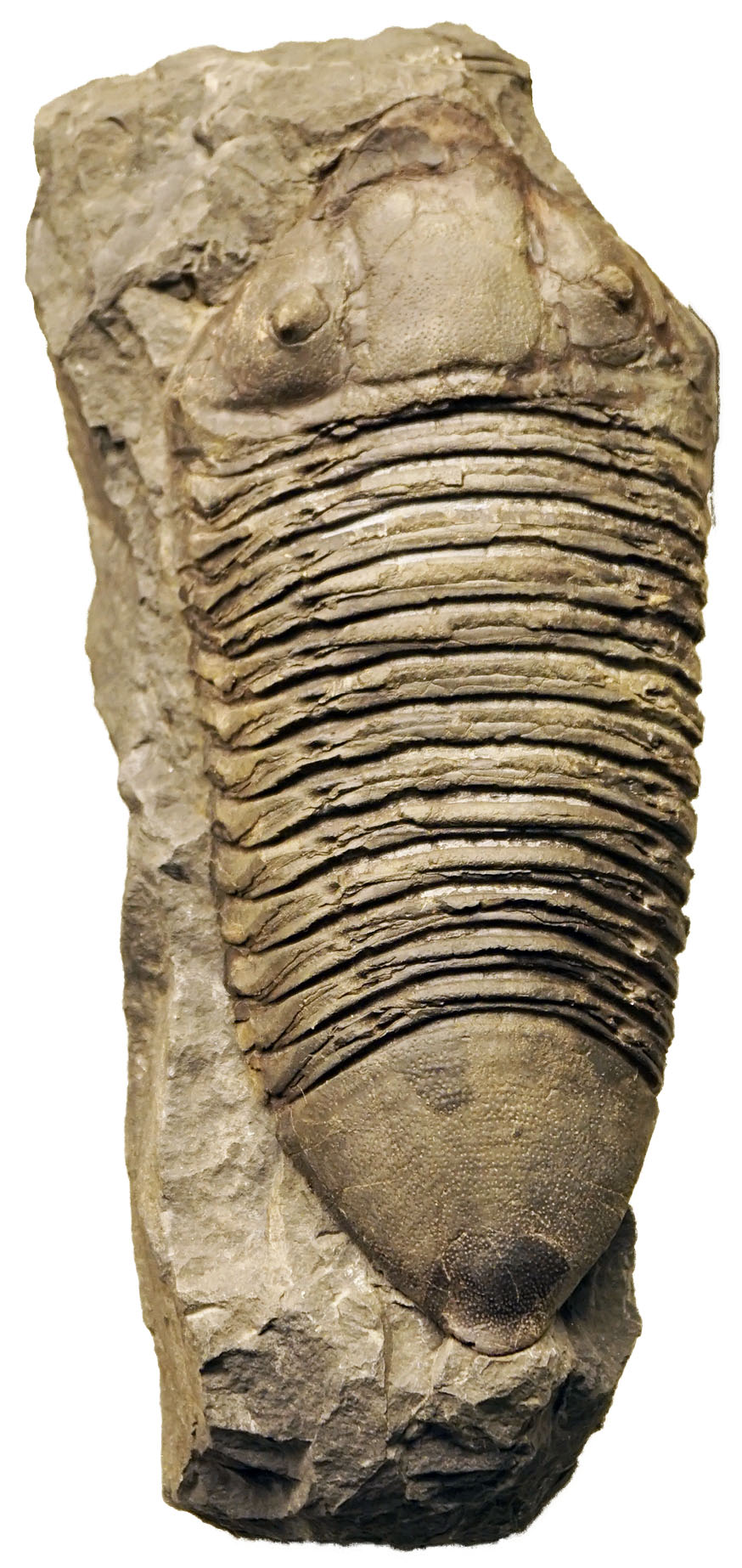
- Fossil of D. dekayi from United States, on display at Galerie de paléontologie et d'anatomie comparée in Paris

Scientific classification
- Domain: Eukaryota
- Kingdom: Animalia
- Phylum: Arthropoda
- Class: †Trilobita
- Order: †Phacopida
- Family: †Homalonotidae
- Genus: †Dipleura; Green, 1832

Type species
- Dipleura dekayi

= Dipleura =

Dipleura Temporal range: Late Ordovician-Mid Devonian ~460–383 Ma

Genus of trilobites

Dipleura is a genus of trilobites in the order Phacopida. It was described by Green in 1832, and the type species is Dipleura dekayi. The type locality was in the Hamilton Group in New York.

These fast-moving low-level epifaunal carnivores lived during the middle Devonian and Ordovician periods from 460.9 to 383.7 Ma.

== Distribution ==
Fossils of this genus have been found in the Devonian of France, Libya and United States, as well as in the Ordovician of United States. Also in the Emsian-Givetian Floresta Formation of the Altiplano Cundiboyacense, Colombia, fossils of Dipleura have been found.
