= List of the Paleozoic life of Ohio =

This list of the Paleozoic life of Ohio contains the various prehistoric life-forms whose fossilized remains have been reported from within the US state of Ohio and are between 538.8 and 252.17 million years of age.

== A ==
- †Abylea – type locality for genus
  - †Abylea minuta – type locality for species
- †Acacocrinus
  - †Acacocrinus anebos
- †Acanthatia
- †Acanthoclema
  - †Acanthoclema lineatum
  - †Acanthoclema ohioensis
  - †Acanthoclema sulcatum
- †Acanthonema
  - †Acanthonema holopiforme
  - †Acanthonema newberryi
- †Acanthopecten
  - †Acanthopecten bellosum – type locality for species
  - †Acanthopecten carboniferus
- †Acanthotriletes
  - †Acanthotriletes aculeolatus
- †Achatella
- †Acidaspis
  - †Acidaspis cincinnatiensis
- †Acleistoceras – tentative report
- †Acmaeoblatta – type locality for genus
  - †Acmaeoblatta lanceolata – type locality for species
- †Acriora
  - †Acriora petala
- †Acteonina
  - †Acteonina hanseni – type locality for species
- †Actinodesma
  - †Actinodesma erectum
- †Actinopteria
  - †Actinopteria boydi
- †Acutichiton – type locality for genus
  - †Acutichiton pyrmidalus – type locality for species
- †Adamanterpeton – type locality for genus
  - †Adamanterpeton ohioensis – type locality for species
- †Aechmina
  - †Aechmina richmondensis
- †Aethaspis
- †Agelacrinites
  - †Agelacrinites southworthi – or unidentified comparable form
- †Agnesia
  - †Agnesia prosseri
- †Alaionema
  - †Alaionema crenulatum
- †Alaskozygopleura
  - †Alaskozygopleura gracillium
- †Alatisporites
  - †Alatisporites trialatus
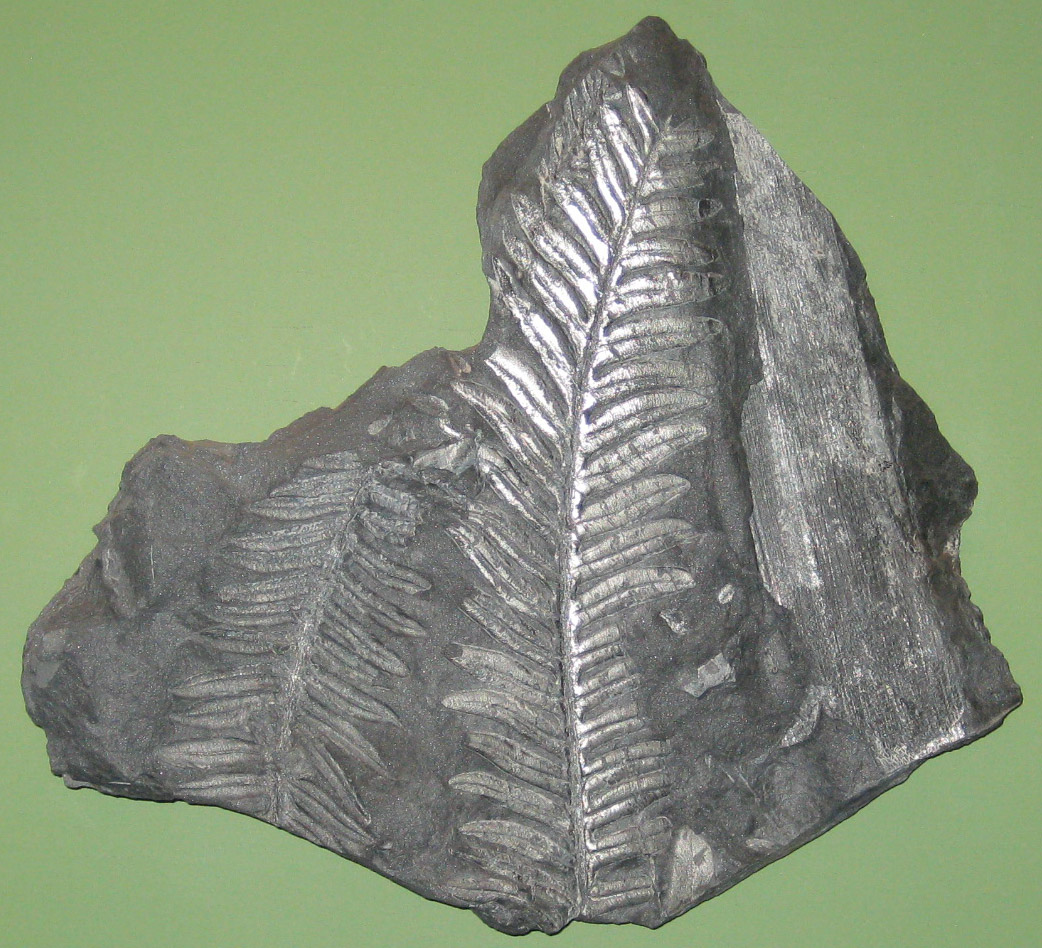
- Fossilized fronds of the Carboniferous-Early Cretaceous seed fern Alethopteris
  †Alethopteris
- †Allocryptaspis
- †Alloiopteris
  - †Alloiopteris erosa
- †Allonema
- †Allonychia
- †Allorisma
  - †Allorisma costatum
- †Alveolites
  - †Alveolites labechii
- †Ambedus – type locality for genus
  - †Ambedus pusilus – type locality for species
- †Ambocoelia
  - †Ambocoelia norwoodi
  - †Ambocoelia umbonata
- †Ambonychia
  - †Ambonychia alata
  - †Ambonychia cultrata
  - †Ambonychia richmondensis
  - †Ambonychia suberecta
- †Ambozone
  - †Ambozone peoriensis – or unidentified comparable form
- †Ametroblatta
  - †Ametroblatta strigosa – type locality for species
- †Ameura
  - †Ameura missouriensis
- †Ammonidium
  - †Ammonidium hamatum
- †Amphilichas
- †Amphiscapha
  - †Amphiscapha catilloides
  - †Amphiscapha reedsi
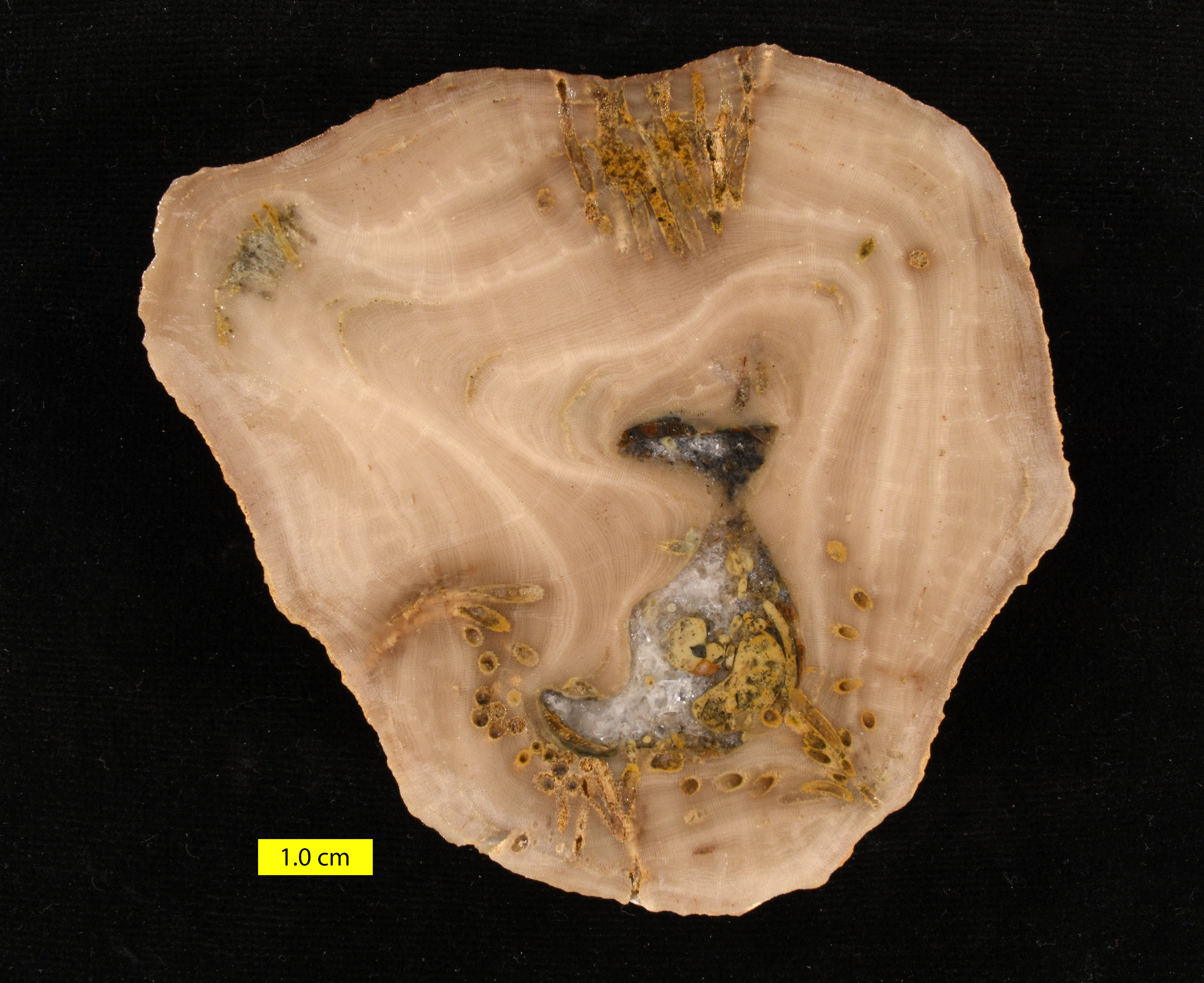
- Ordovician-Permian bryozoan Amplexopora
  †Amplexopora
  - †Amplexopora pustulosa
  - †Amplexopora robusta
- †Anaptychus – tentative report
  - †Anaptychus emersoni
- †Anartiocystis
  - †Anartiocystis foerstei
- †Anaspyroceras
- †Ancienta
  - †Ancienta ohioensis
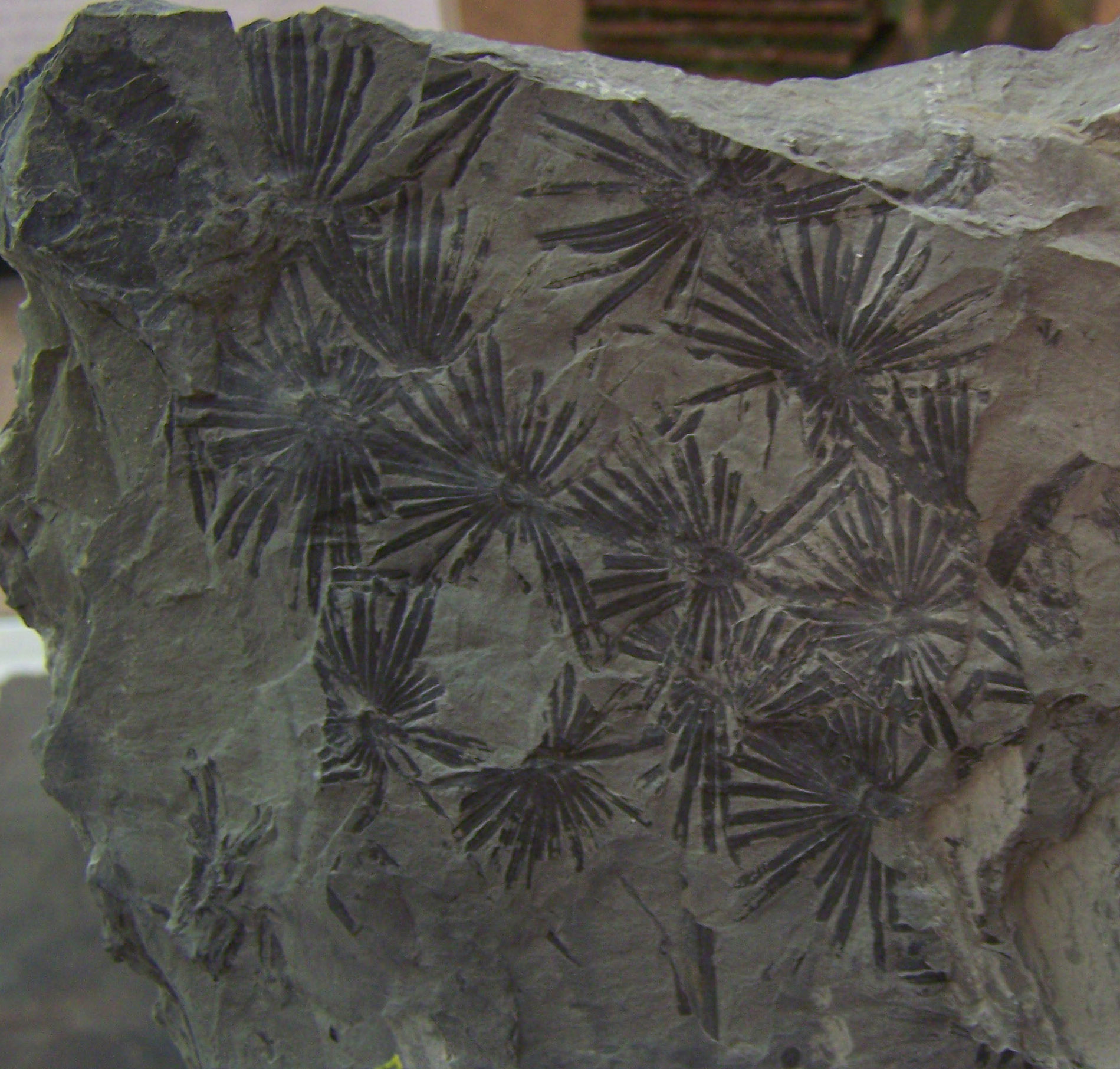
- Fossil of the Carboniferous horsetail relative Annularia
  †Annularia
  - †Annularia asteris
  - †Annularia radiata
  - †Annularia sphenophylloides
  - †Annularia stellata
- †Anomalocrinus
- †Anomalodonta
  - †Anomalodonta costata
- †Anomalotoechus
  - †Anomalotoechus tuberatus
- †Anostylostroma
  - †Anostylostroma columnare
  - †Anostylostroma laxum
- †Anozyga – type locality for genus
  - †Anozyga bulla – type locality for species
- †Anthracodromeus
  - †Anthracodromeus longipes – type locality for species
- †Anthracopupa – type locality for genus
  - †Anthracopupa ohioensis – type locality for species
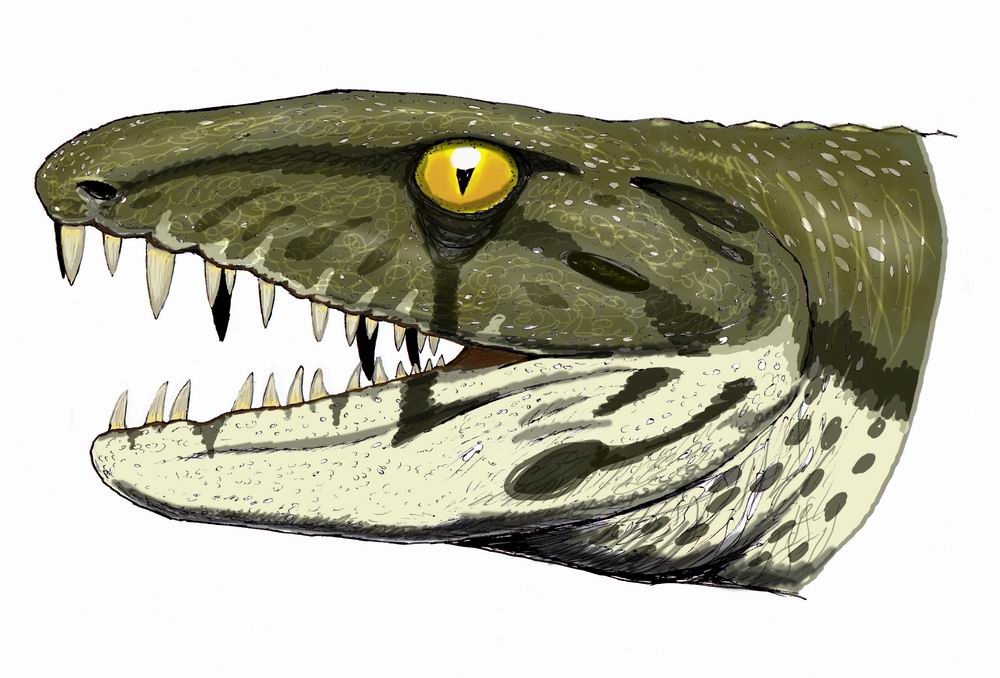
- Restoration of the face of the Carboniferous reptiliomorph Anthracosaurus
  †Anthracosaurus
  - †Anthracosaurus lancifer – type locality for species
- †Antiquaster
  - †Antiquaster magrumi
- †Antiquatonia
  - †Antiquatonia costata
  - †Antiquatonia portlockianus
- †Aparchites
  - †Aparchites minutissimus
  - †Aparchites oblongus
- †Aphelakardia
  - †Aphelakardia alternistriata
- †Aphlebia
- †Apiculatasporites
  - †Apiculatasporites acueatus
  - †Apiculatasporites latigranifer
  - †Apiculatasporites saetiger
  - †Apiculatasporites setulosus
- †Arabellites
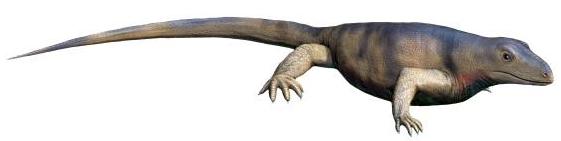
- Life restoration of the Carboniferous synapsid (mammal precursor) Archaeothyris
  †Archaeothyris
- †Archegogryllus – type locality for genus
  - †Archegogryllus priscus – type locality for species
- †Archinacella
  - †Archinacella rugatina
- †Arcochiton – type locality for genus
  - †Arcochiton raymondi – type locality for species
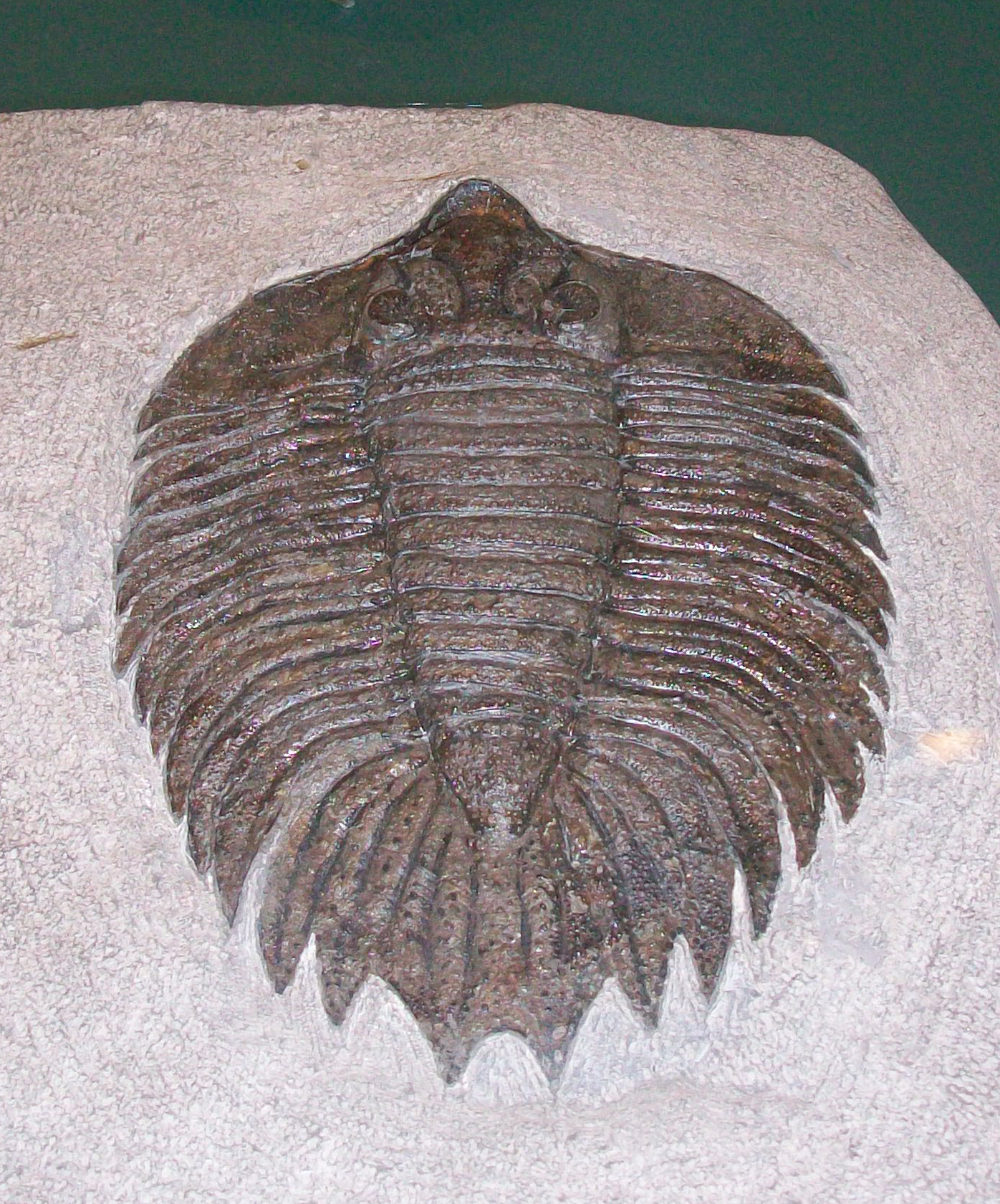
- Fossil of the Silurian trilobite Arctinurus
  †Arctinurus
- †Arjamannia
  - †Arjamannia inexpectans
- †Armenoceras
- †Arthraria
  - †Arthraria biclavata
- †Arthroacantha
  - †Arthroacantha carpenteri
- †Arthropitys
- Arthropoma
  - †Arthropoma shafferi
- †Arthrostylus
- †Artisia
- †Ascodictyon
  - †Ascodictyon fusiforme
- †Asolanus
  - †Asolanus camptotaenia
  - †Asolanus sigillarioides
- †Aspidopora
  - †Aspidopora newberryi
- †Astartella
  - †Astartella clinata – type locality for species
  - †Astartella concentrica
  - †Astartella varica
  - †Astartella vera
- †Asterotheca
- †Atactoblatta – type locality for genus
  - †Atactoblatta anomala – type locality for species
- †Atactoechus
  - †Atactoechus typicus – or unidentified comparable form
- †Atactopora
- †Atactoporella
- †Ateleocystites
- †Athyris
  - †Athyris vittata
- †Atraktoprion
- †Atrypa
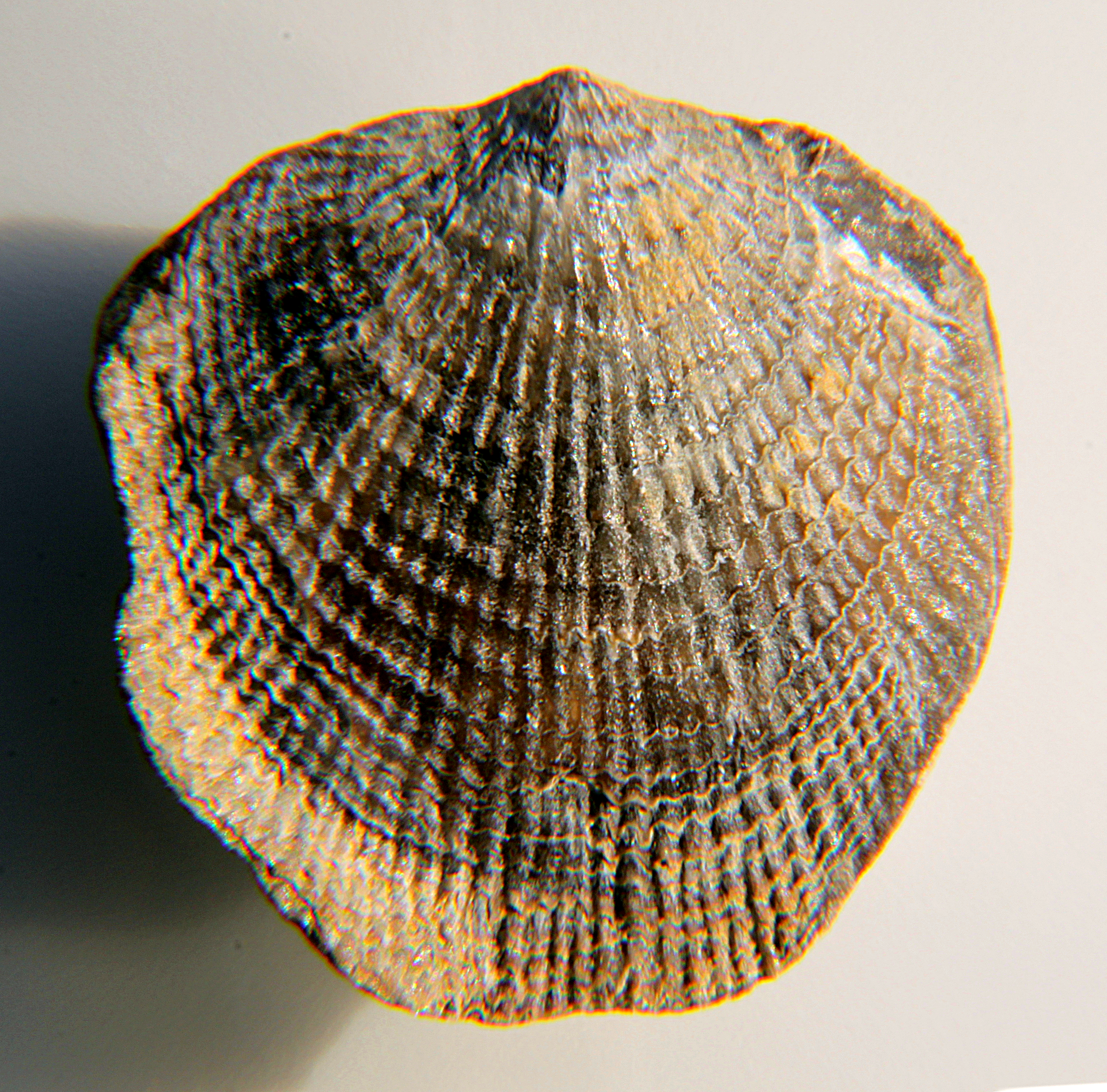
  - Fossilized shell of the Silurian-Late Devonian brachiopod Atrypa reticularis
    †Atrypa reticularis
  - †Atrypa reticularus – report made of unidentified related form or using admittedly obsolete nomenclature
- †Augustoceras
- †Aulacella
- †Aulacera
  - †Aulacera nodulosa
- †Aulocystis
  - †Aulocystis auloporoidea
  - †Aulocystis auloporoides
  - †Aulocystis flabellata
  - †Aulocystis jacksoni
  - †Aulocystis lucasensis
- †Aulopora
  - †Aulopora microbuccinata
  - †Aulopora serpens
- †Austinella
  - †Austinella scovellei
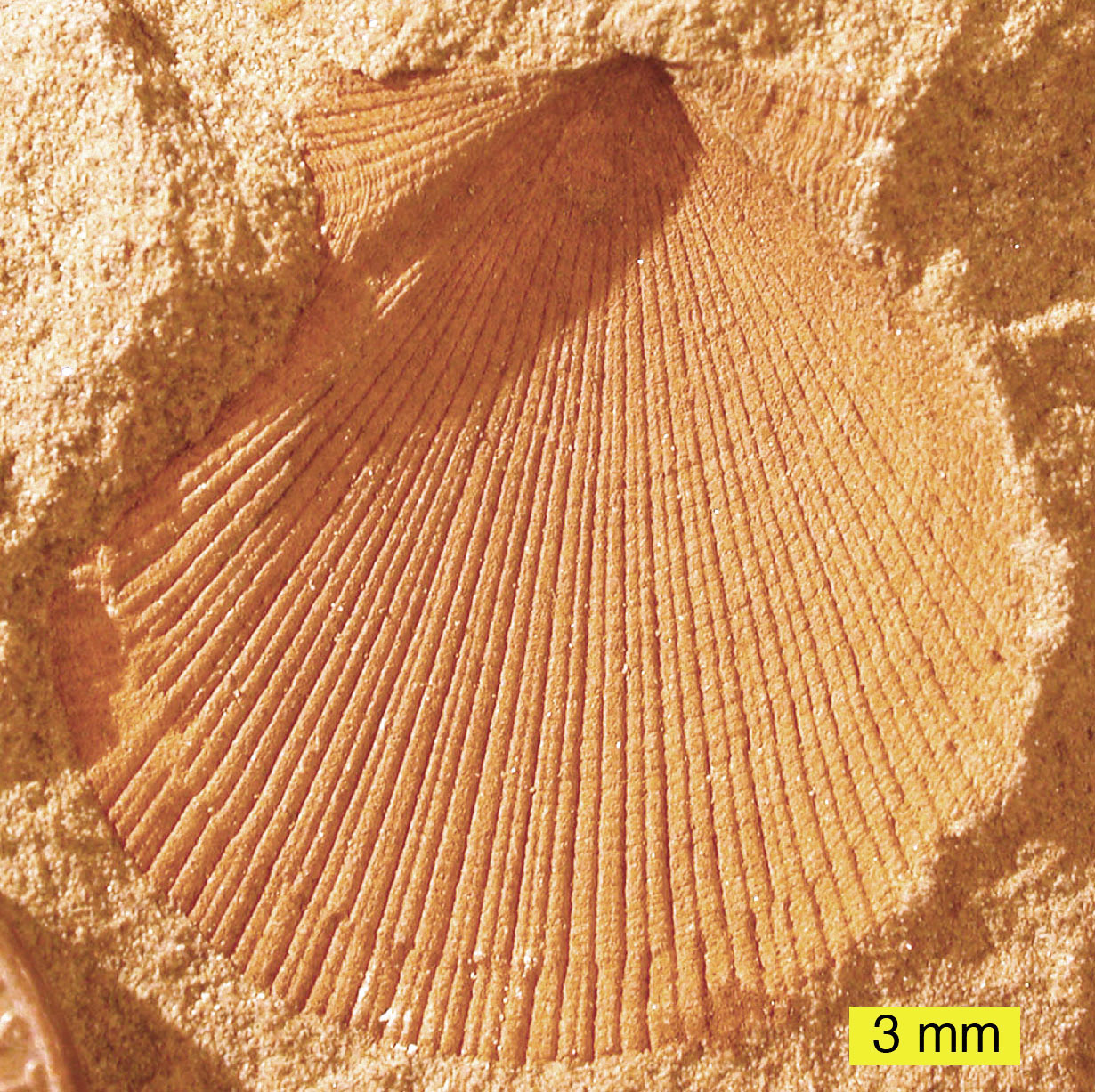
- Mold fossil found near Wooster of a shell of the Early Devonian-Late Triassic bivalve Aviculopecten
  †Aviculopecten
  - †Aviculopecten appalachianus – type locality for species
  - †Aviculopecten columbianus – type locality for species
  - †Aviculopecten coxanus
  - †Aviculopecten fasciculatus
  - †Aviculopecten occidentalis
  - †Aviculopecten princeps
  - †Aviculopecten winchelli
- †Aviculopinna
  - †Aviculopinna peracuta

== B ==
- †Bactrites – tentative report
  - †Bactrites arkonensis – or unidentified comparable form
- Bairdia
  - †Bairdia devonica
- †Balbiniconcha
  - †Balbiniconcha hebe
- †Baldwinonus
  - †Baldwinonus dunkardensis
- †Barathrisphaeridium
  - †Barathrisphaeridium chagrinense
  - †Barathrisphaeridium pumilispinosum
- †Barbclabornia
  - †Barbclabornia luedersensis
- †Barychilina
- †Batostoma
  - †Batostoma varians
- †Batostomella
  - †Batostomella gracilis
  - †Batostomella striata
- †Baylea
  - †Baylea giffordi – or unidentified comparable form
  - †Baylea inclinata – type locality for species
- †Beatricea
  - †Beatricea undulata
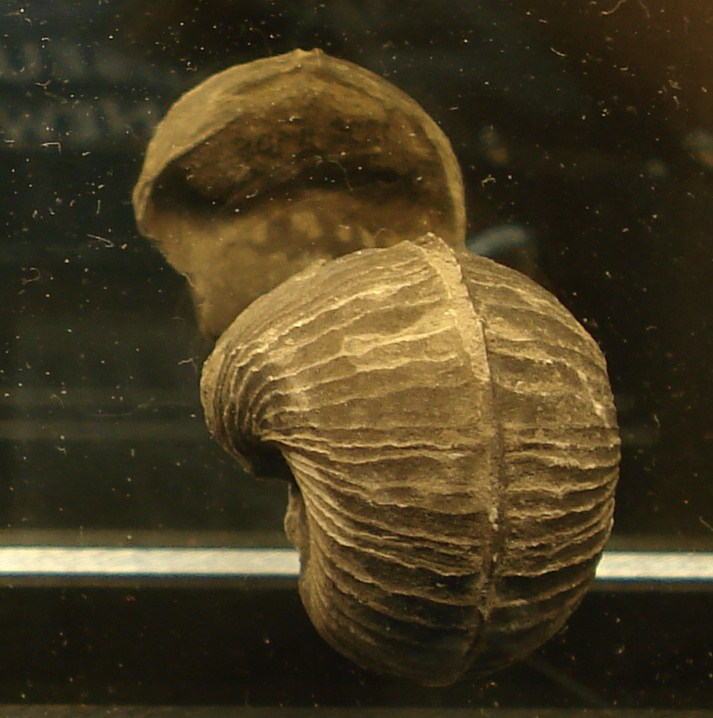
- Fossilized shell of the Silurian-Early Triassic mollusc Bellerophon
  †Bellerophon
  - †Bellerophon hyalina
  - †Bellerophon jeffersonensis
  - †Bellerophon newberryi
  - †Bellerophon pelops
  - †Bellerophon spergensis
  - †Bellerophon stevensianus
  - †Bellerophon stummi – type locality for species
  - †Bellerophon whittleseyi – type locality for species
- †Belodella
- †Beloitoceras
  - †Beloitoceras amoenum
- †Bembexia
  - †Bembexia adjutor – type locality for species
  - †Bembexia insolita
- Berenicea
- †Bethanyphyllum
  - †Bethanyphyllum robustum
- †Bicarina
  - †Bicarina petilitornata
- †Bickmorites
- †Bikocrinus
  - †Bikocrinus baios
- †Billingsastraea
  - †Billingsastraea longicarinata
- †Billingsastrea
  - †Billingsastrea longicarinata
- †Blattinopsis
  - †Blattinopsis americana – type locality for species
  - †Blattinopsis anthracina – type locality for species
  - †Blattinopsis latipennis – type locality for species
- †Bodmania
- †Bollia
  - †Bollia persulcata
  - †Bollia regularis
- †Botryllopora
  - †Botryllopora socialis
- †Botryocrinus
  - †Botryocrinus neimani
- †Bowmanites
  - †Bowmanites incurvata
  - †Bowmanites magna
- †Brachiospongia
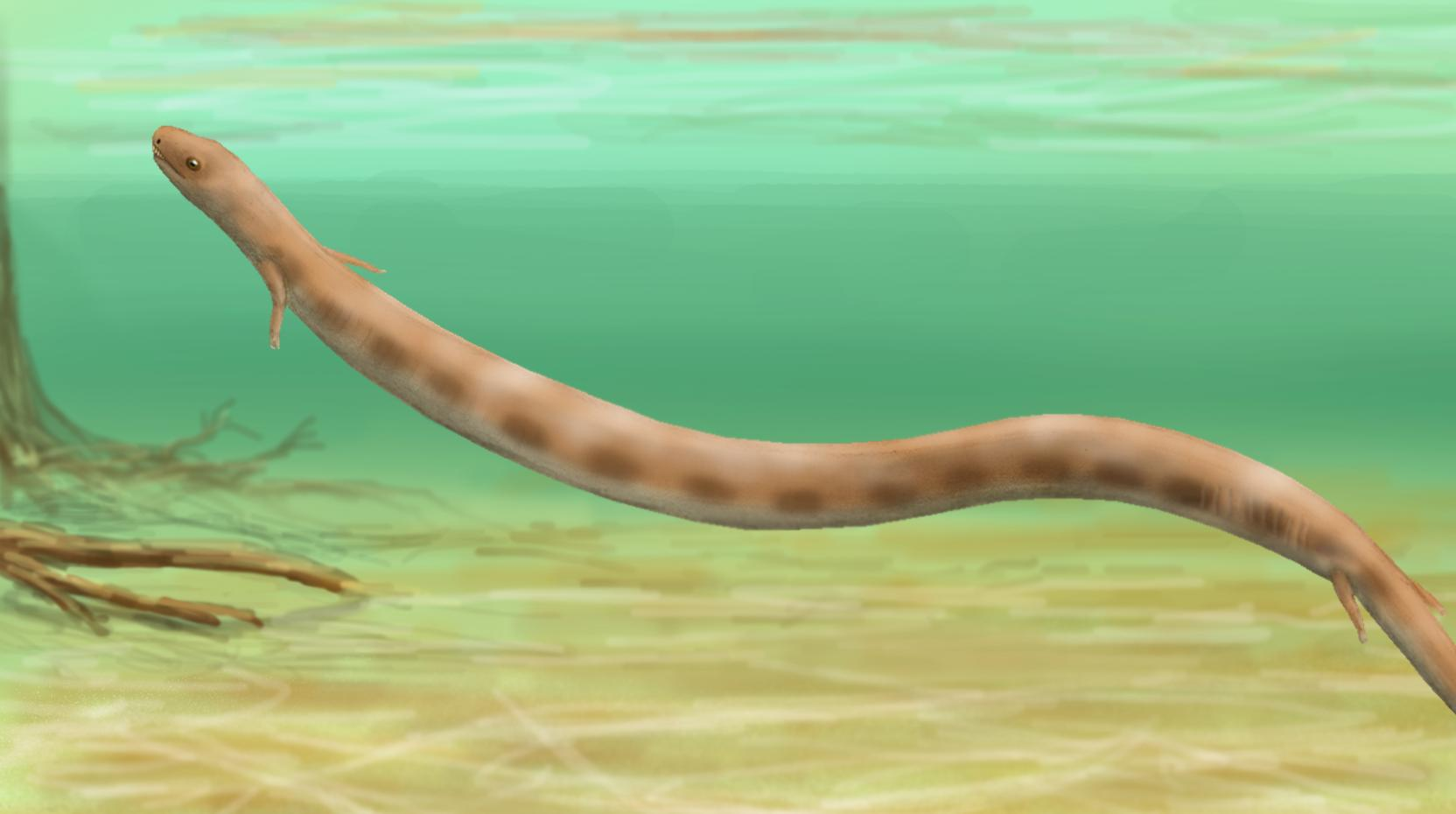
- Life restoration of the Carboniferous amphibian Brachydectes
  †Brachydectes – type locality for genus
  - †Brachydectes newberryi – type locality for species
- †Brockocystis
  - †Brockocystis nodosaria
- †Broiliellus
  - †Broiliellus hektotopos – type locality for species
- †Bucanella
- †Bucania
  - †Bucania crassa
- †Bucanopsis
- †Buthotrephis
  - †Buthotrephis gracilis
- †Byssonychia
  - †Byssonychia grandis
  - †Byssonychia radiata
- Bythocypris
  - †Bythocypris cylindrica
  - †Bythocypris punctatus
- †Bythopora
  - †Bythopora delicatula
  - †Bythopora striata

== C ==
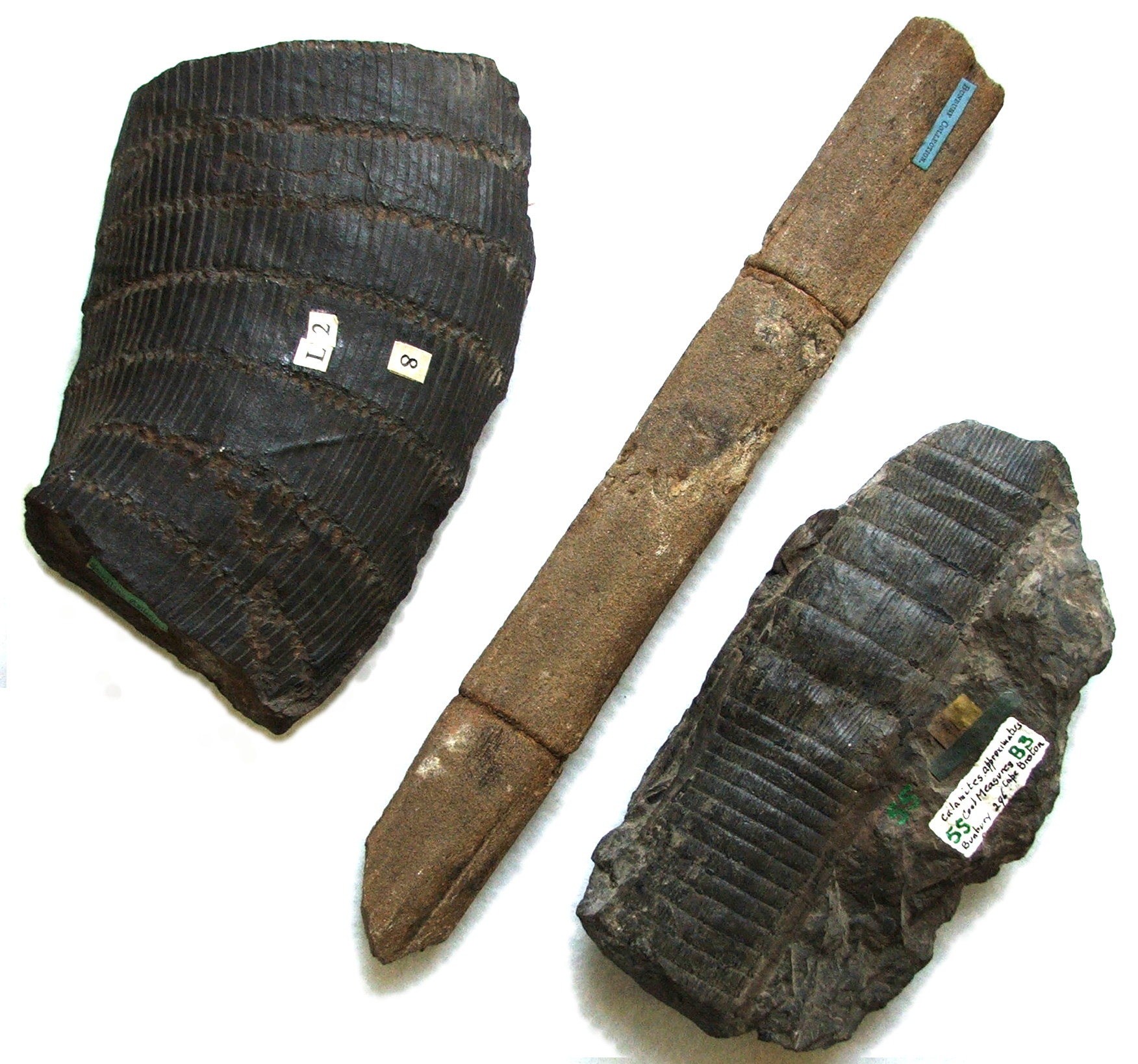
- Fossilized stems from the Carboniferous-Permian horsetail relative Calamites
  †Calamites
  - †Calamites carinatus
  - †Calamites cisti
  - †Calamites citiifromis
  - †Calamites sachsi
  - †Calamites schützeiformis
  - †Calamites suckowi
  - †Calamites suckowii
  - †Calamites undulatus
- †Calamospora
  - †Calamospora breviradiata
  - †Calamospora hartungiana
  - †Calamospora straminea
- †Calamostachys
  - †Calamostachys bisporangiata – type locality for species
  - †Calamostachys germanica
  - †Calamostachys interculata – type locality for species
  - †Calamostachys longibracteata – type locality for species
  - †Calamostachys minuta – type locality for species
  - †Calamostachys recurvata – type locality for species
  - †Calamostachys tuberculata
- †Calapoecia
- †Calceocrinus
  - †Calceocrinus incertus
- †Callipleura
  - †Callipleura nobilis – or unidentified comparable form
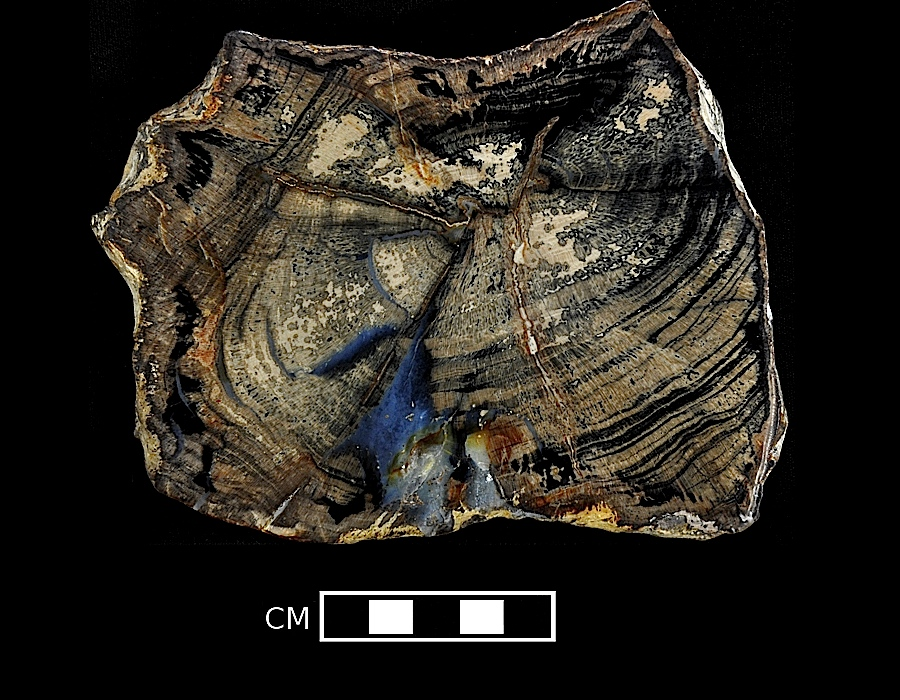
- A polished round of the permineralised Late Devonian-Carboniferous wood Callixylon
  †Callixylon
  - †Callixylon clevelandensis
  - †Callixylon newberryi
- †Calloporella
- †Calostylis – tentative report
  - †Calostylis lindstroemi
- †Calvibembexia
  - †Calvibembexia sulcomarginata
- †Camarotoechia
  - †Camarotoechia semiplicata
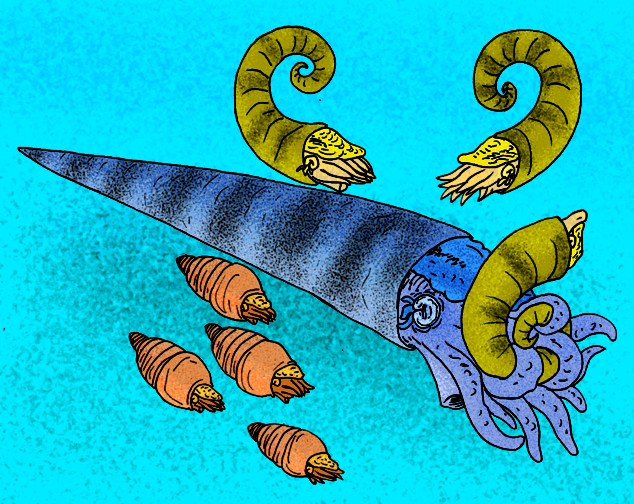
- Restoration of the Middle Ordovician-Silurian nautiloid cephalopod Cameroceras feeding on an Aphetoceras, while a quartet of Cyclostomiceras swim by
  †Cameroceras
- †Cardiocarpon
- †Cardiomorpha
  - †Cardiomorpha missouriensis
- †Carneyella
  - †Carneyella foerstei
- †Caryocrinites
- †Catazone
  - †Catazone eversolensis – type locality for species
- †Catazyga
  - †Catazyga headi
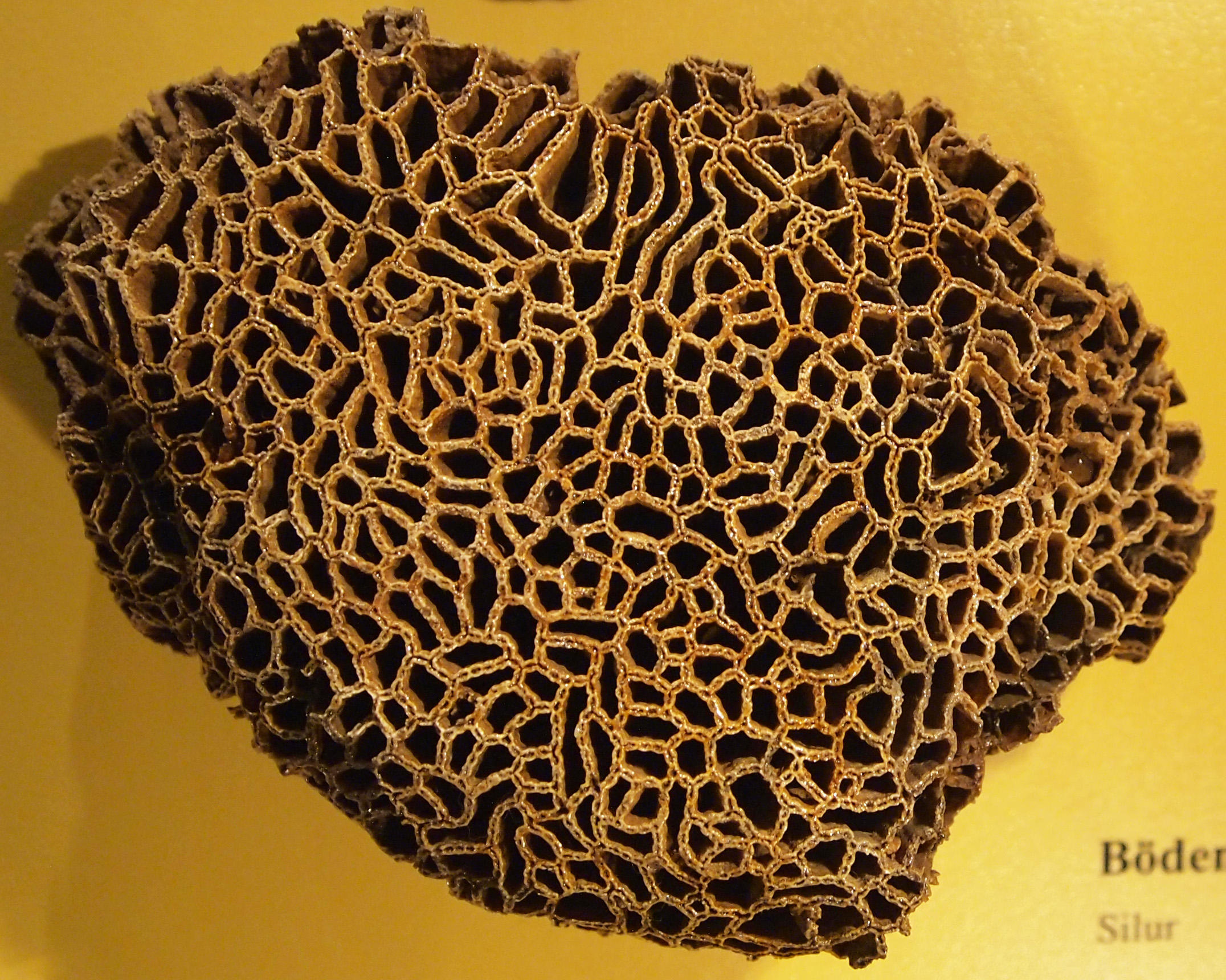
- Fossil of the Ordovician-Silurian tabulate coral Catenipora
  †Catenipora
  - †Catenipora favositomima
  - †Catenipora favositomina
  - †Catenipora gotlandica
- †Caulopteris
  - †Caulopteris antiqua
  - †Caulopteris peregrina
- †Cayugaea
  - †Cayugaea intermittens
  - †Cayugaea transitorius – tentative report
- †Centroceras
- †Centrorhynchus (= Sartenaerus)
- †Ceramoporella
  - †Ceramoporella granulosa
  - †Ceramoporella ohioensis
- †Ceratocephala
- †Ceratoikiscum
  - †Ceratoikiscum bujugum
  - †Ceratoikiscum spinosiarcuatum
- †Ceratoikiscump
  - †Ceratoikiscump erittacanthinum
  - †Ceratoikiscump lanistellare
- †Ceratopsis
  - †Ceratopsis chambersi
  - †Ceratopsis oculifera
- †Ceraurinus
  - †Ceraurinus icarus
- †Ceraurus
- †Chaenomya
  - †Chaenomya leavenworthensis
- †Chagrinia
- †Chagrinichnites
- †Charactoceras
- †Chasmatopora
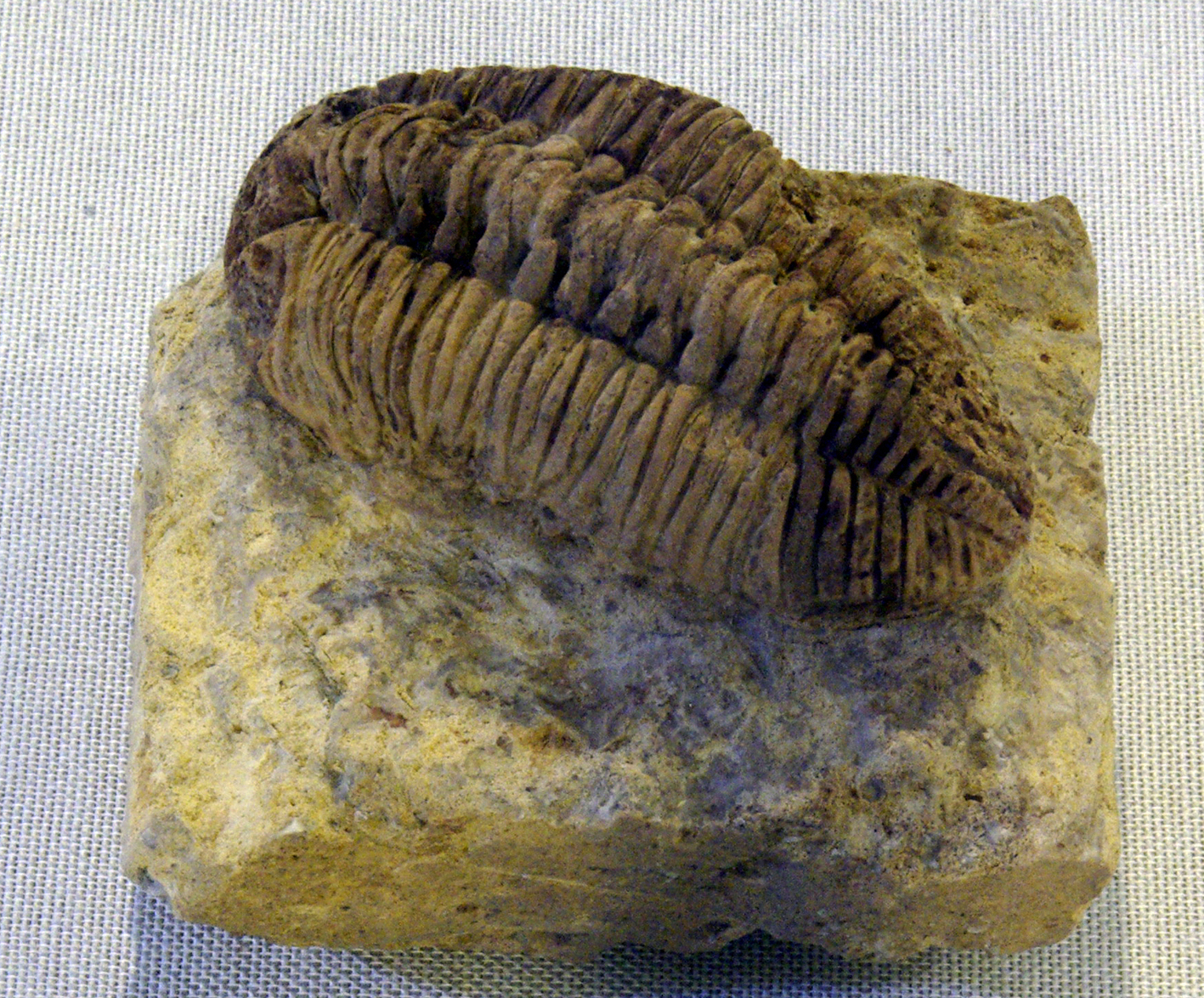
- Fossil of the Late Ordovician trilobite Chasmops
  †Chasmops
- †Chaunograptus
- †Chiloporella
- †Chlidochirus
  - †Chlidochirus springeri
- †Chondrites
- †Chonetes
  - †Chonetes aurora – tentative report
  - †Chonetes deflectus
  - †Chonetes minutus
  - †Chonetes mucronatus – tentative report
- †Chonetina
  - †Chonetina choteauensis
- †Chonetinella
  - †Chonetinella flemingi
  - †Chonetinella verneuilana
  - †Chonetinella verneuiliana
- †Cincinnaticrinus
- †Cincinnatidiscus
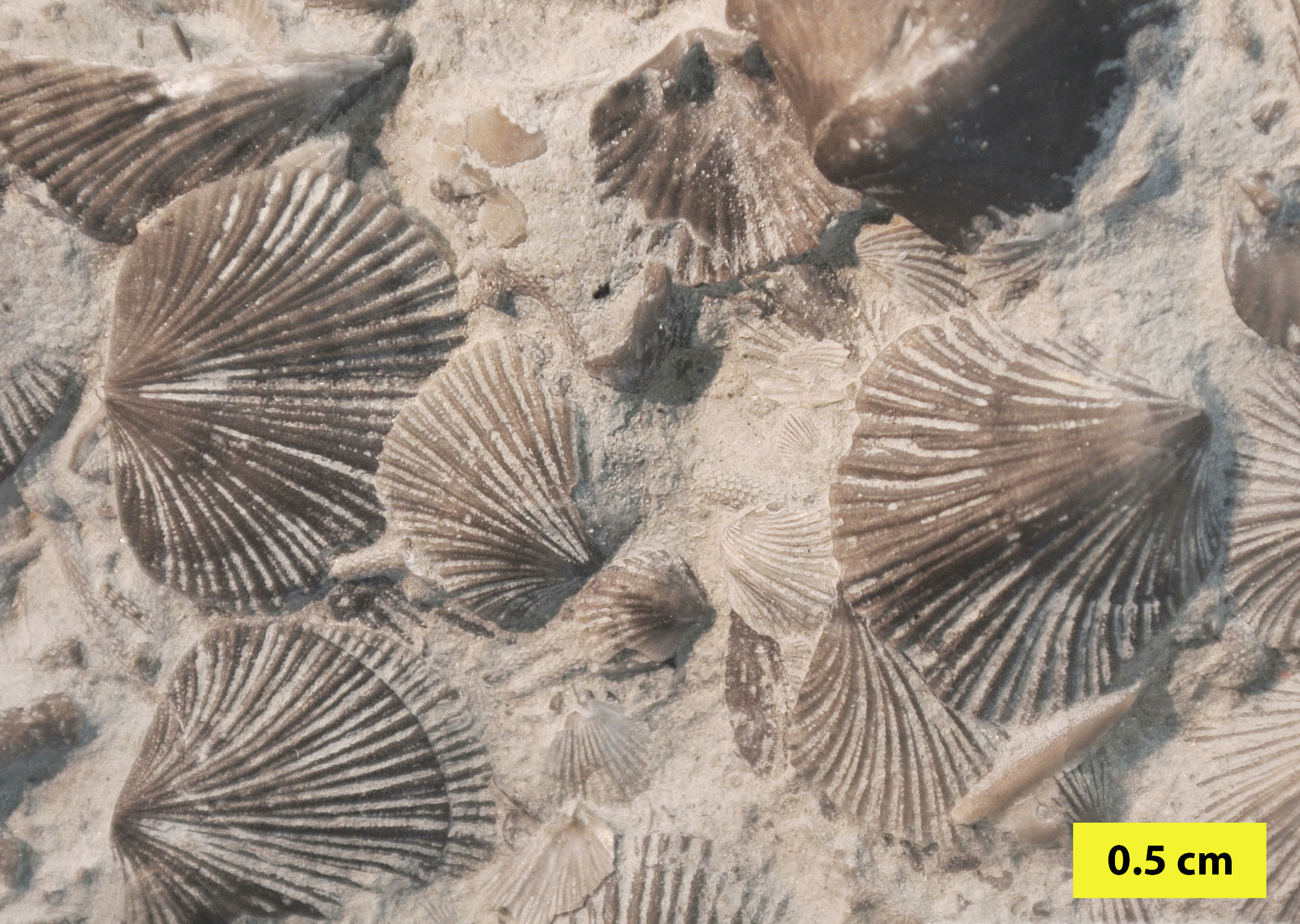
- Assemblage of fossilized shells found in southern Ohio of the Ordovician brachiopod Cincinnetina
  †Cincinnetina
  - †Cincinnetina meeki
  - †Cincinnetina multisecta
- †Cirratriradites
  - †Cirratriradites annulatus
- †Cladochonus
- †Cladopora
  - †Cladopora bifurcata
  - †Cladopora crassa
  - †Cladopora lucasensis
  - †Cladopora minuitissima
  - †Cladopora roemeri
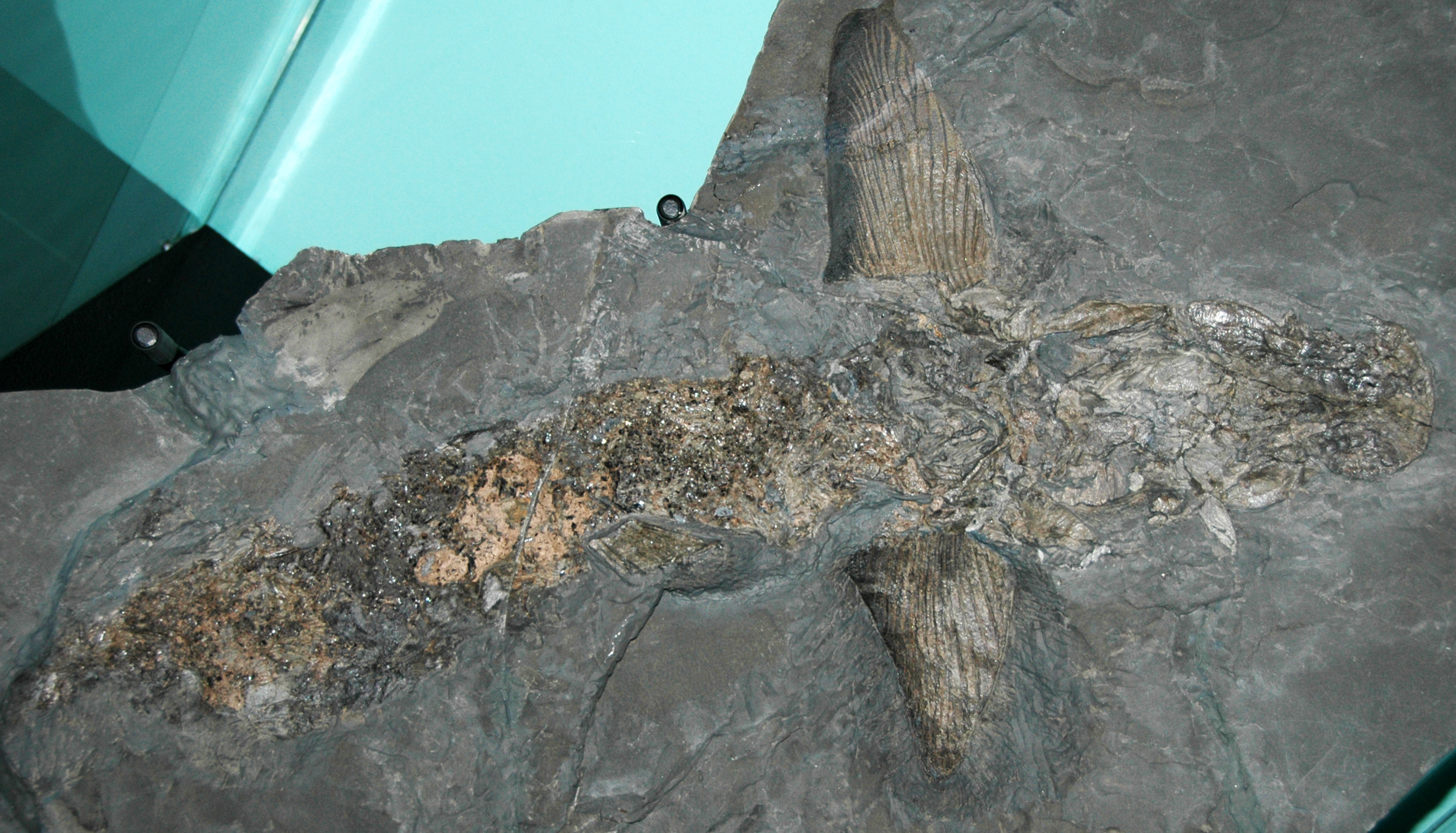
- Fossil found in Ohio of the Late Devonian shark Cladoselache
  †Cladoselache
  - †Cladoselache clarki
- †Clarkesvillia
- †Clathrodictyon
  - †Clathrodictyon confertum
- †Clathrospira
- †Claudeonychia – type locality for genus
  - †Claudeonychia babini – type locality for species
- †Cleionychia
- †Clemetaocrinus
  - †Clemetaocrinus ohioensis
- †Clevelandodendron
  - †Clevelandodendron ohioensis
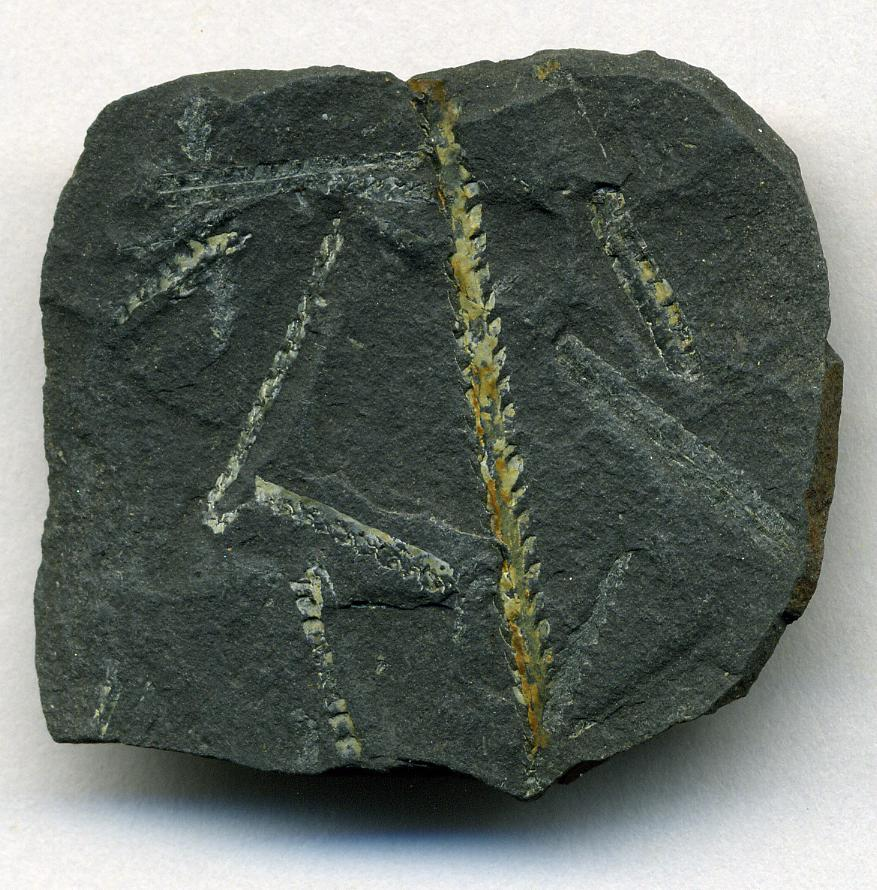
- Assemblage of fossils of the Cambrian graptolite Climacograptus
  †Climacograptus
- †Clinopistha
  - †Clinopistha radiata
- †Coelocaulus
  - †Coelocaulus desiderata
  - †Coelocaulus strebloceras – tentative report
- †Coeloclema
  - †Coeloclema oweni
- †Coenites
- †Coleolus
  - †Coleolus iowensis
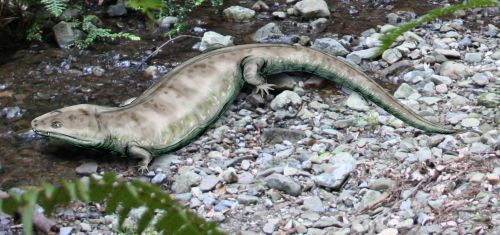
- Life restoration of the Carboniferous tetrapodomorph Colosteus
  †Colosteus
  - †Colosteus scutellatus – type locality for species
- †Columnaria
  - †Columnaria calicina
- †Comasphaeridium
  - †Comasphaeridium caesariatum
- †Composita
  - †Composita subtilita
- †Compsocrinus
  - †Compsocrinus harrisi
- †Conchidium
- †Conradidium
  - †Conradidium firmamentum
- †Constellaria
- †Conularia
  - †Conularia formosa
- †Convolutispora
  - †Convolutispora mellita
- †Cordaianthus
- †Cordaites
  - †Cordaites principalis – or unidentified comparable form
- †Cornellites
  - †Cornellites flabellum
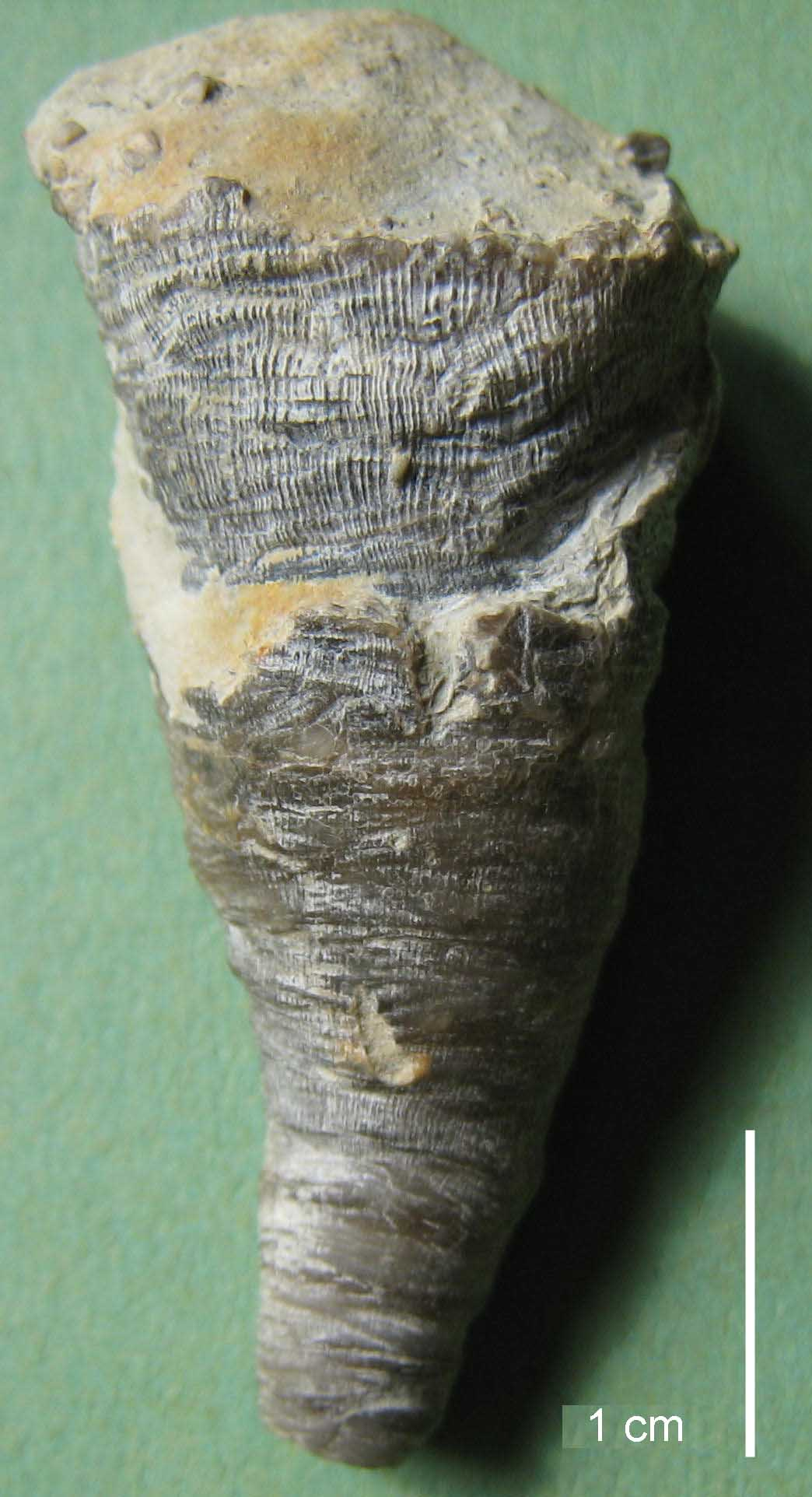
- Fossil of the Middle Ordovician-Carboniferous horn coral Cornulites
  †Cornulites
  - †Cornulites flexuosus
- †Corocrinus
  - †Corocrinus noduosus
- †Corynotrypa
  - †Corynotrypa delicatula
  - †Corynotrypa inflata
- †Corythoecia
  - †Corythoecia dichoptera
- †Costatulites
  - †Costatulites richmondensis
- †Cranaena
  - †Cranaena romingeri
- Craniella
  - †Craniella hamiltonae
- †Crassisphaeridium
  - †Crassisphaeridium inusitatum
- †Crassispora
  - †Crassispora kosankei
- †Crenistriella
  - †Crenistriella rotalinea
- †Crenulazona
  - †Crenulazona angulata
- †Crepipora
- †Crurithyris
  - †Crurithyris planoconvexa
- †Cryptolithus
  - †Cryptolithus tesselata
- †Ctenacanthus
  - †Ctenacanthus compressus
- †Ctenerpeton
  - †Ctenerpeton remex – type locality for species
- †Ctenobolbina
  - †Ctenobolbina ciliata
  - †Ctenobolbina duryi
  - †Ctenobolbina hammeli
- †Ctenodonta
  - †Ctenodonta madisonensis
  - †Ctenodonta recurva
- †Ctenospondylus
  - †Ctenospondylus ninevehensis
- †Cuffeyella
  - †Cuffeyella arachnoidea
- †Cunctocrinus
  - †Cunctocrinus fortunatus – type locality for species
- †Cuneamya
  - †Cuneamya elliptica
  - †Cuneamya miamiensis
  - †Cuneamya scapha
- †Cupularostrum
  - †Cupularostrum prolificum
- †Cupulocrinus
- †Cycloconcha
- †Cyclocystoides
- †Cyclogranisporites
  - †Cyclogranisporites microgranus
  - †Cyclogranisporites minutus
  - †Cyclogranisporites obliquus
  - †Cyclogranisporites orbicularis
- †Cyclonema
  - †Cyclonema bilix
  - †Cyclonema gyronemoides
  - †Cyclonema humerosum
  - †Cyclonema minuta
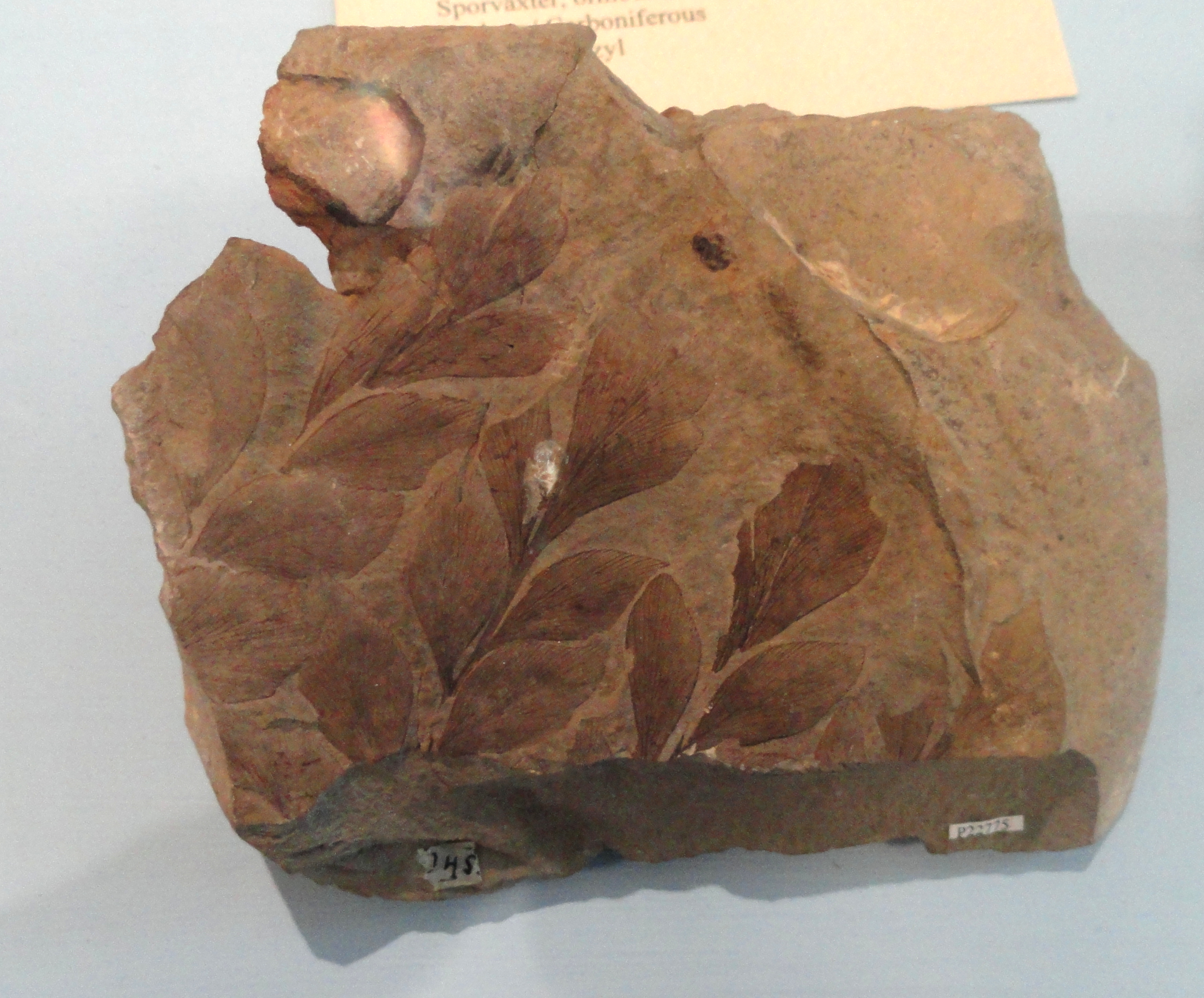
- Fossilized foliage from the Carboniferous seed fern Cyclopteris
  †Cyclopteris
  - †Cyclopteris orbicularis
  - †Cyclopteris trichomanoides
- †Cyclora
  - †Cyclora depressa
  - †Cyclora hoffmani
  - †Cyclora parvula
  - †Cyclora pulcella
- †Cyclozyga
  - †Cyclozyga attenuata – type locality for species
  - †Cyclozyga mirabilis
- †Cylindrocoelia
- †Cylindrophyllum
  - †Cylindrophyllum delicatulum
  - †Cylindrophyllum delicatum
  - †Cylindrophyllum profundum
- †Cymatiosphaera
  - †Cymatiosphaera acinosa
  - †Cymatiosphaera adaiochorata
  - †Cymatiosphaera brevicrista
  - †Cymatiosphaera daioariochora
  - †Cymatiosphaera labyrinthica
  - †Cymatiosphaera parvicarina
  - †Cymatiosphaera rhacoamba
  - †Cymatiosphaera velicarina
- †Cymatonota
  - †Cymatonota constricta
  - †Cymatonota cylindrica
  - †Cymatonota parallela
  - †Cymatonota recta
  - †Cymatonota semistriata
- †Cymatospira
  - †Cymatospira alternodosa – type locality for species
  - †Cymatospira montfortianus
- †Cyperites
- †Cyphotrypa
  - †Cyphotrypa clarksvillensis
- †Cypricardinia
  - †Cypricardinia indenta
- Cypridina
  - †Cypridina herzeri
- †Cyrtentactinia
  - †Cyrtentactinia cibdelosphaera
  - †Cyrtentactinia primotica
- †Cyrtina
  - †Cyrtina alpenensis
  - †Cyrtina hamiltonensis
  - †Cyrtina umbonata
- †Cyrtocerina
- †Cyrtodonta
  - †Cyrtodonta halli
- †Cyrtodontula
- †Cyrtolites
  - †Cyrtolites claysferryensis
  - †Cyrtolites inornatum
  - †Cyrtolites ornatus
  - †Cyrtolites retrorsus
- †Cyrtospira
  - †Cyrtospira directus
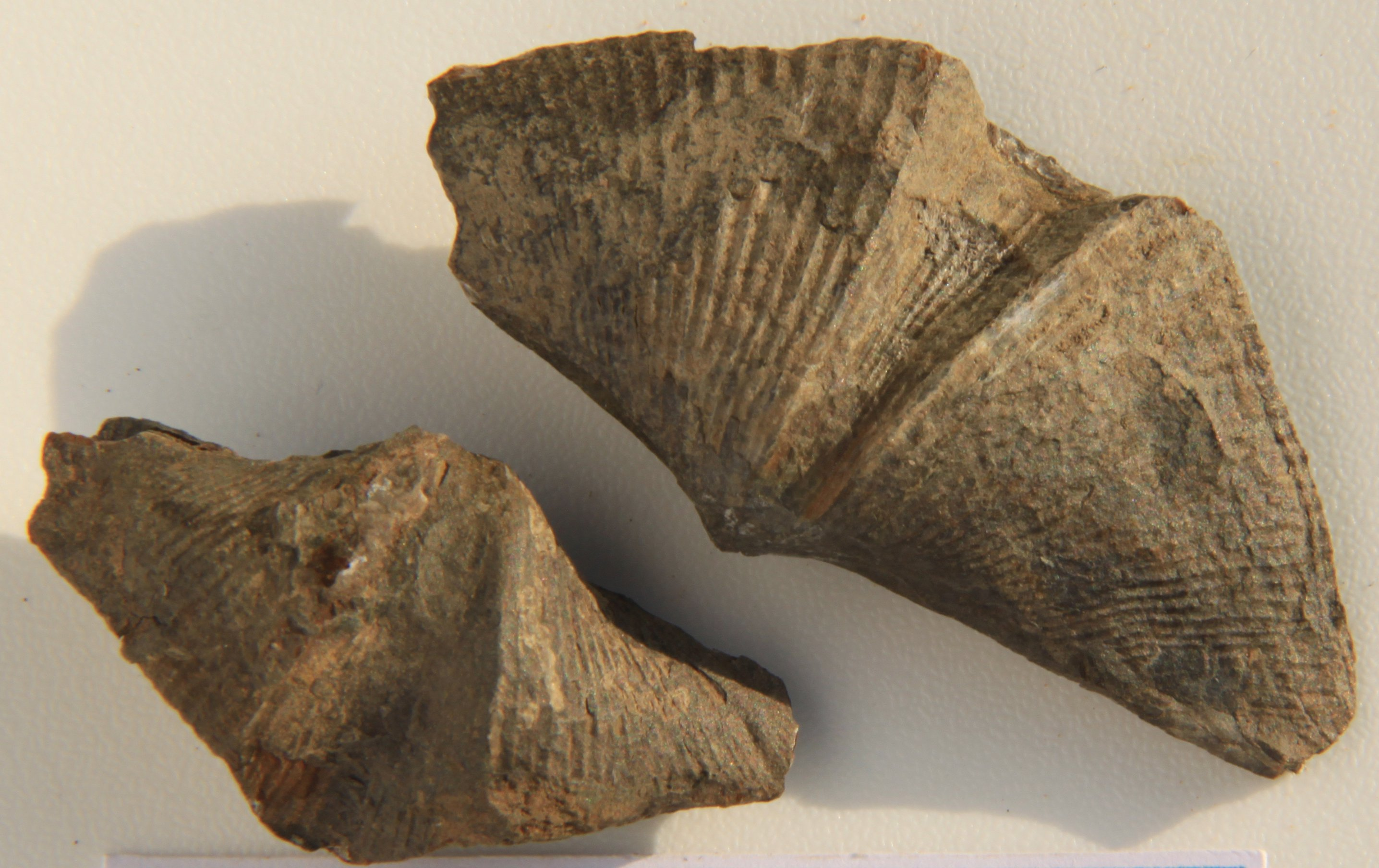
- Fossilized shells of the Middle-Late Devonian brachiopod Cyrtospirifer
  †Cyrtospirifer
- †Cystaster
- †Cystiphylloides
  - †Cystiphylloides americanum
- †Cystodictya
  - †Cystodictya hamiltonensis
  - †Cystodictya incisurata
- Cythere
  - †Cythere ohioensis
- Cytherella
  - †Cytherella unioniformis

== D ==
- †Dalmanella
- †Danaeites
  - †Danaeites emersonii
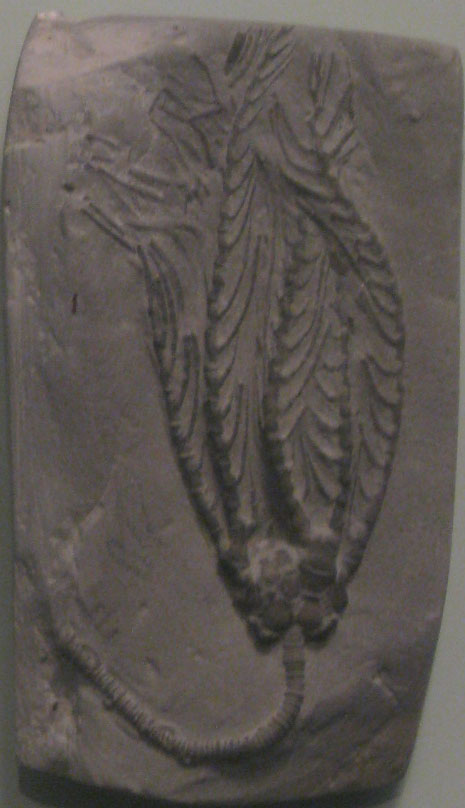
- Fossilized calyx of the Carboniferous crinoid ("sea lily") Decadocrinus
  †Decadocrinus
  - †Decadocrinus hughwingi
  - †Decadocrinus stewartae
  - †Decadocrinus wrightae
- †Deceptrix
  - †Deceptrix albertina
- †Dechenella
  - †Dechenella alpenensis
  - †Dechenella lucasensis
- †Dekayella
- †Dekayia
- †Deltodus
- †Deltoidospora
  - †Deltoidospora levis
  - †Deltoidospora priddyi
- †Denayella
  - †Denayella rotalia
- †Dendrocrinus
  - †Dendrocrinus daytonensis
- †Derbyia
  - †Derbyia crassa
- †Dermatostroma
  - †Dermatostroma scabrum
- †Desmoinesia
  - †Desmoinesia muricatina
- †Devonalosia
  - †Devonalosia wrightorum
- †Devonochonetes
  - †Devonochonetes coronatus
  - †Devonochonetes fragilis
  - †Devonochonetes scitulus
- †Devonorhineoderma
  - †Devonorhineoderma hyphantes
- †Diaphorochroa
  - †Diaphorochroa ganglia
- †Dicalamophyllum
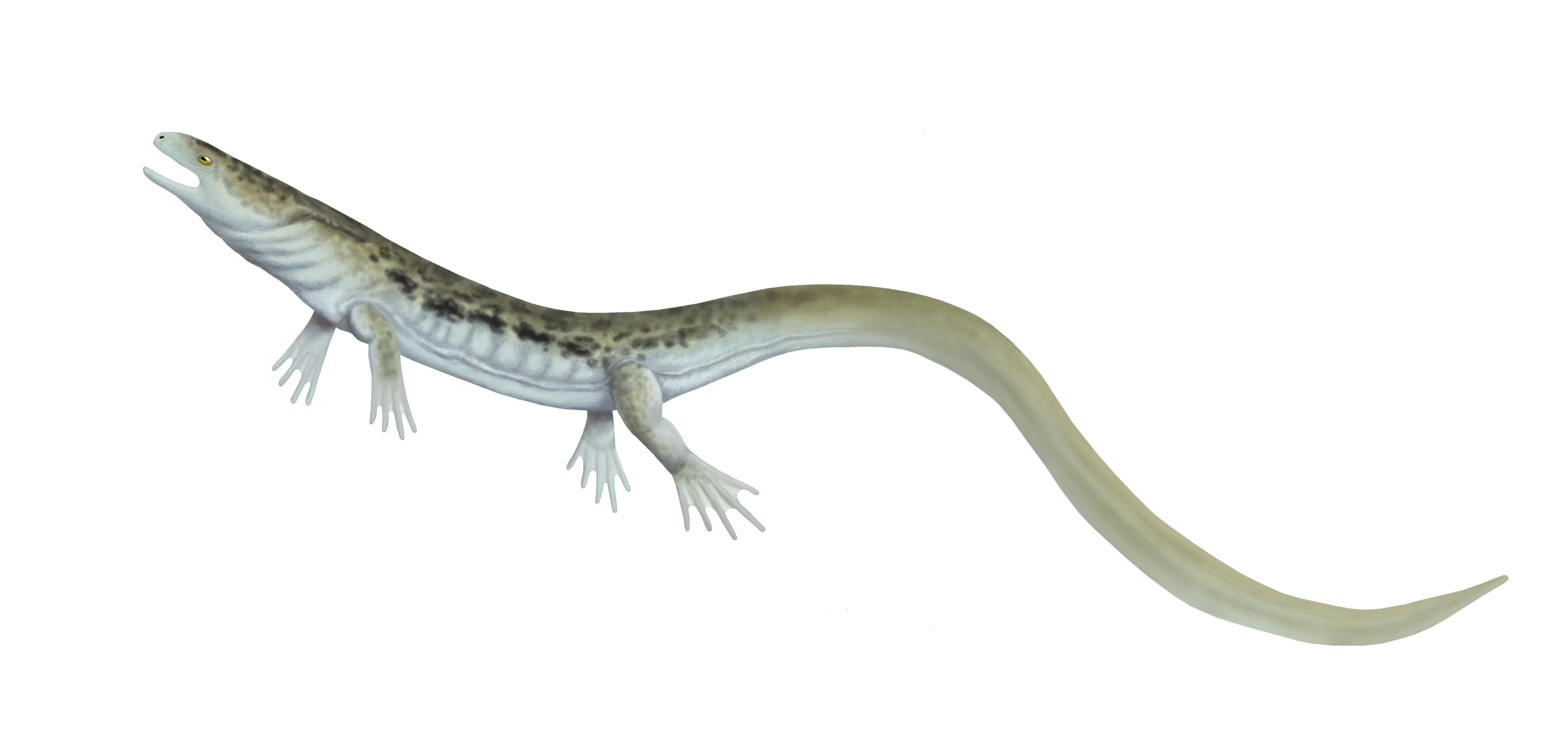
- Life restoration of the Carboniferous amphibian Diceratosaurus
  †Diceratosaurus
  - †Diceratosaurus brevirostris – type locality for species
- †Dicranopora
  - †Dicranopora emacerata
- †Dictyoclostus
  - †Dictyoclostus semireticulatus
- †Dictyonema
- †Dictyotomaria
  - †Dictyotomaria capillaria
  - †Dictyotomaria scitula – or unidentified comparable form
- †Diestoceras
  - †Diestoceras eos
  - †Diestoceras indianense
  - †Diestoceras shideleri
- †Diexallophasis
  - †Diexallophasis absona
  - †Diexallophasis cuspidis
- †Dinichthys
  - †Dinichthys herzeri
- †Dinophyllum
  - †Dinophyllum semilunum
  - †Dinophyllum stokesi
- †Dinorthis
  - †Dinorthis carleyi
- †Diphyphyllum
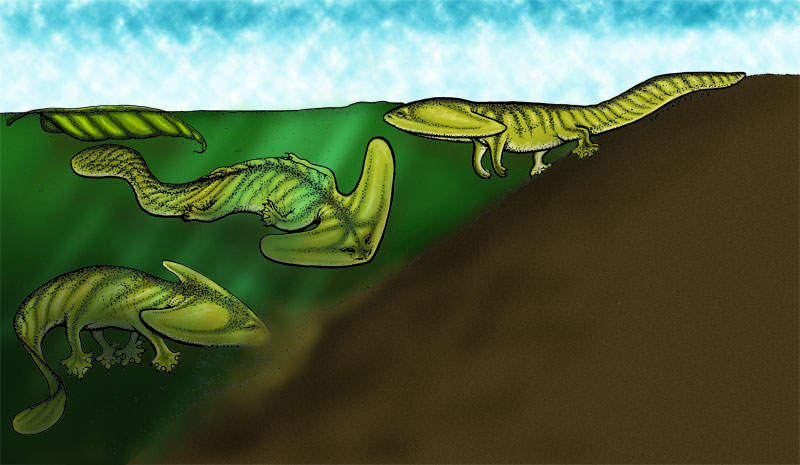
- Life restoration of a swimming group of the Permian amphibian Diploceraspis
  †Diploceraspis
- †Diplograptus
  - †Diplograptus recurrens
- Discina
- †Discotrypa
- †Dithyrocaris
  - †Dithyrocaris neptuni – or unidentified comparable form
- †Ditomopyge
  - †Ditomopyge decurtata
  - †Ditomopyge scitula
- †Divietipellis
  - †Divietipellis robusta
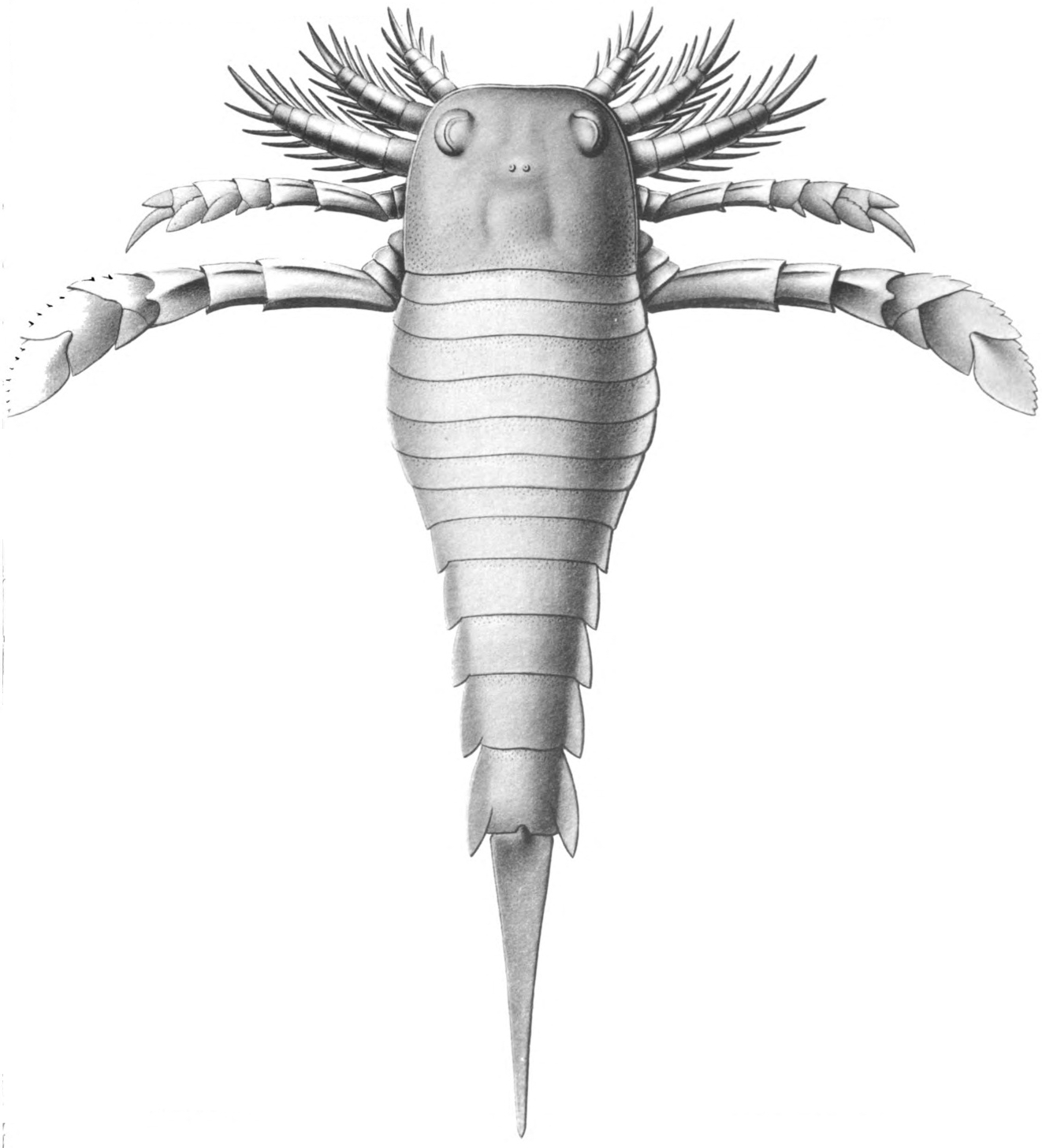
- Life restoration of the Silurian eurypterid ("sea scorpion") Dolichopterus
  †Dolichopterus
  - †Dolichopterus asperatus
- †Donaldiella
- †Donaldina
  - †Donaldina bellilineata – or unidentified comparable form
  - †Donaldina pygmaea – tentative report
  - †Donaldina robusta – type locality for species
  - †Donaldina stevensana – type locality for species
- †Dorsennidium
  - †Dorsennidium patulum
- †Doryblatta – type locality for genus
  - †Doryblatta longipennis – type locality for species
- †Douvillina
  - †Douvillina distans
- †Drepanella
  - †Drepanella richardsoni
- †Drepanoistodus
- †Drymocrinus
  - †Drymocrinus geniculatus
- †Dunbarella
  - †Dunbarella knighti – or unidentified comparable form
  - †Dunbarella striata
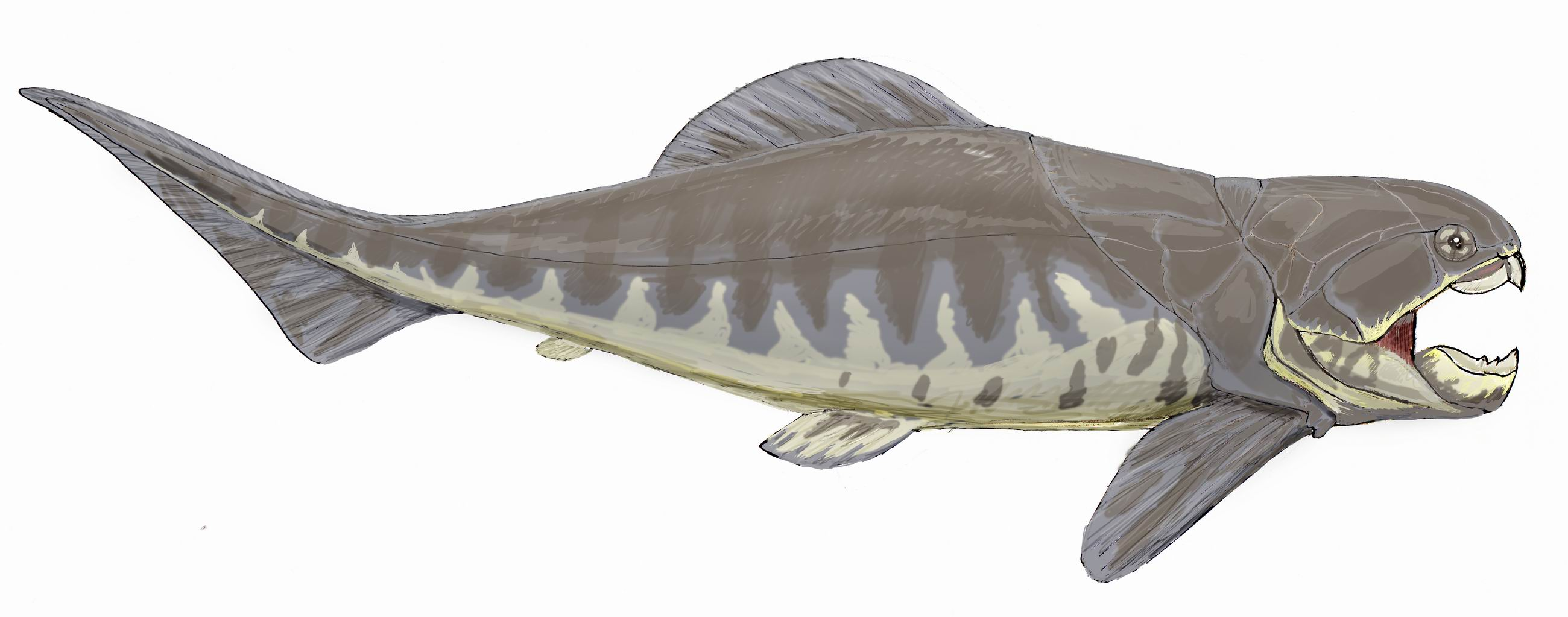
- Life restoration of the Late Devonian placoderm fish Dunkleosteus
  †Dunkleosteus
  - †Dunkleosteus raveri – type locality for species
- †Dvorakia
- †Dystactocrinus
  - †Dystactocrinus constrictus
- †Dystactospongia

== E ==
- †Ecclimadictyon
- †Ecdyceras
  - †Ecdyceras foerstei
- †Echinocaris
  - †Echinocaris multinodosa
  - †Echinocaris multispinosis
  - †Echinocaris ohioensis – type locality for species
  - †Echinocaris pulchra – type locality for species
  - †Echinocaris punctata
  - †Echinocaris sublevis
- †Echinocoelia
- †Echinoconchus
  - †Echinoconchus punctatus
- †Echinolichas
  - †Echinolichas lucasensis
- †Ecmelostoiba
  - †Ecmelostoiba asymmetrica
  - †Ecmelostoiba leptoderma
- †Economolopsis
  - †Economolopsis anodontoides
- †Ectenocrinus
  - †Ectenocrinus simplex
- †Ecthymabrachion
  - †Ecthymabrachion camptos
- †Edmondia
  - †Edmondia aspenwallensis
  - †Edmondia aspinwallensis
  - †Edmondia nebrascensis
  - †Edmondia nodulifera – type locality for species
- †Edon
  - †Edon oblonga
- †Elasmonema
  - †Elasmonema bellatula
  - †Elasmonema clarki
  - †Elasmonema corrugata – type locality for species
  - †Elasmonema imitator
  - †Elasmonema lichas
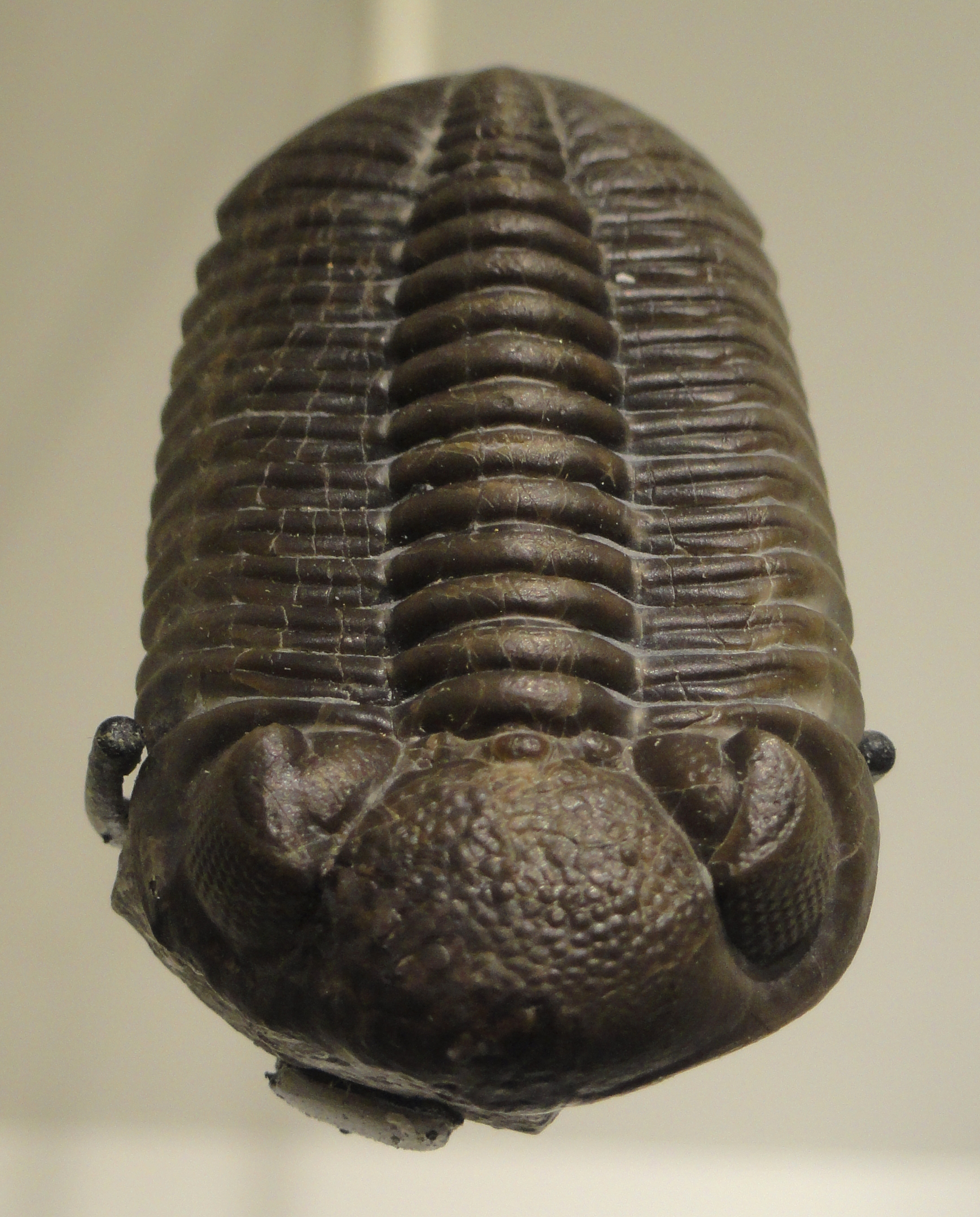
- Fossil found near Sylvania of the Middle-Late Devonian trilobite Eldredgeops
  †Eldredgeops
  - †Eldredgeops rana
- †Elegantilites – tentative report
- †Elektoriskos
  - †Elektoriskos apodasmios
  - †Elektoriskos arcetotricus
  - †Elektoriskos lasios
- †Eliasopora
  - †Eliasopora stellatum
- †Elita
- †Elpe
  - †Elpe cincinnatiensis
  - †Elpe irregularis
  - †Elpe ulrichi
- †Elrodoceras
- †Emmonsia
  - †Emmonsia arbuscula
  - †Emmonsia radiciformis
- †Endelocrinus
  - †Endelocrinus kieri – type locality for species
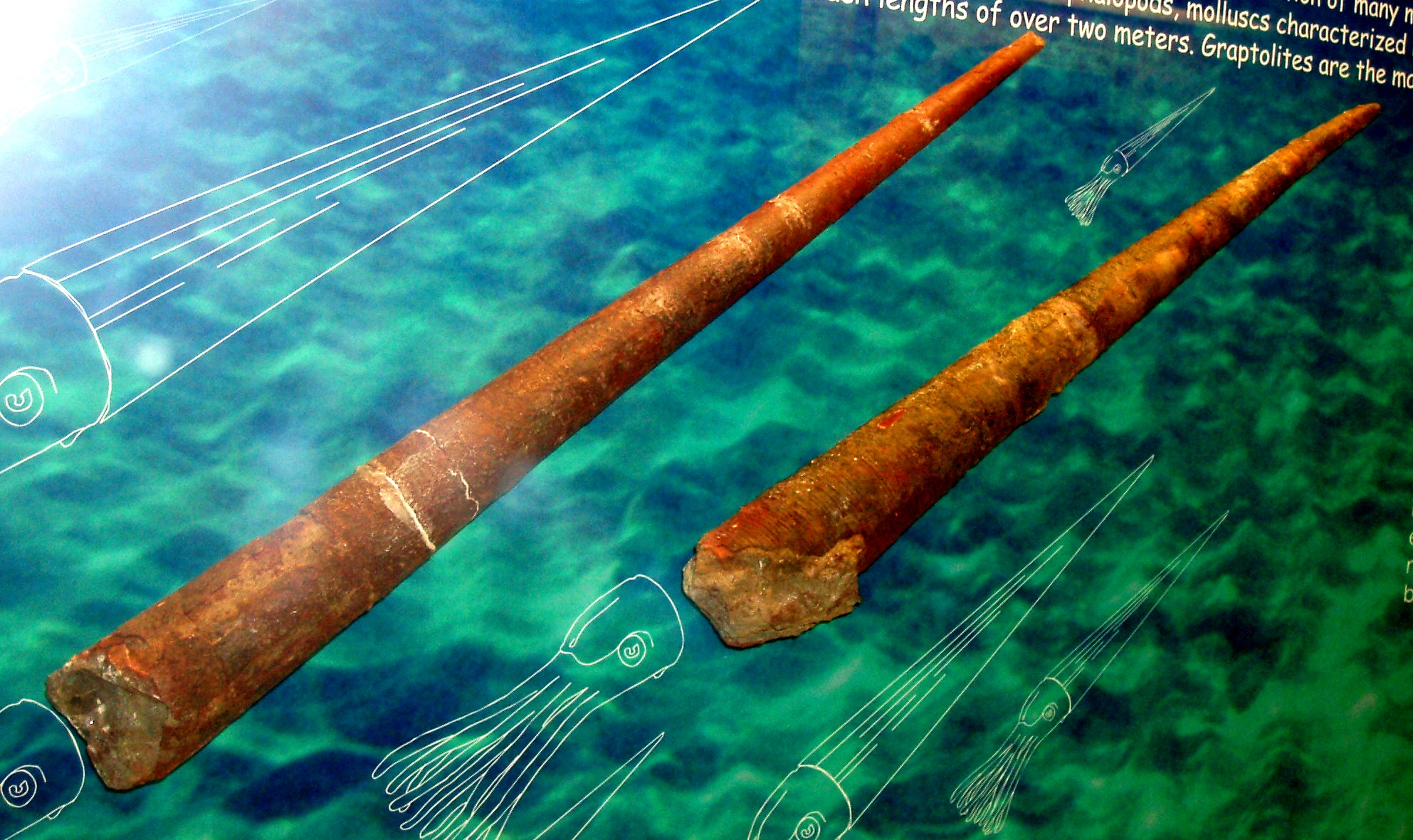
- Fossilized shells and restored appearances of the Middle-Late Ordovician nautiloid cephalopod Endoceras
  †Endoceras
- †Endosporites
  - †Endosporites globiformis
  - †Endosporites plicatus
  - †Endosporites zonalis
- †Endothyra
  - †Endothyra kennethi
- †Endothyranella
  - †Endothyranella inflata
  - †Endothyranella intermissa
  - †Endothyranella minuta – or unidentified comparable form
  - †Endothyranella nitida – or unidentified comparable form
  - †Endothyranella stormi – or unidentified comparable form
- †Entactinia
  - †Entactinia additiva
  - †Entactinia cometes
  - †Entactinia crustescens
  - †Entactinia exilispina
  - †Entactinia herculea
  - †Entactinia micula
  - †Entactinia monalloea
  - †Entactinia pantosompha
  - †Entactinia paula
  - †Entactinia quantilla
  - †Entactinia somphorhips
  - †Entactinia spongites
  - †Entactinia sychnacanthina
- †Entactinosphaera
  - †Entactinosphaera diplostraca
  - †Entactinosphaera dystactotata
  - †Entactinosphaera echinata – tentative report
  - †Entactinosphaera erebenna
  - †Entactinosphaera esostrongyla
  - †Entactinosphaera euthlasta
  - †Entactinosphaera fredericki
  - †Entactinosphaera hapala
  - †Entactinosphaera hystricosa
  - †Entactinosphaera inusitata
  - †Entactinosphaera polyacanthina
  - †Entactinosphaera riedeli
  - †Entactinosphaera symphypora
  - †Entactinosphaera tretactinia
  - †Entactinosphaera variacanthina
- †Entactinosphaerap
  - †Entactinosphaerap alimbola
- †Enteletes
  - †Enteletes hemiplicata
- †Eochonetes
  - †Eochonetes clarksvillensis
  - †Eochonetes clarkvillensis
- †Eomarginifera
  - †Eomarginifera longispinus
- †Eomyelodactylus
  - †Eomyelodactylus rotundatus
- †Eomylodactylus
  - †Eomylodactylus rotundatus
- †Eotrophina
- †Ephelopalla
  - †Ephelopalla elongata
  - †Ephelopalla talea
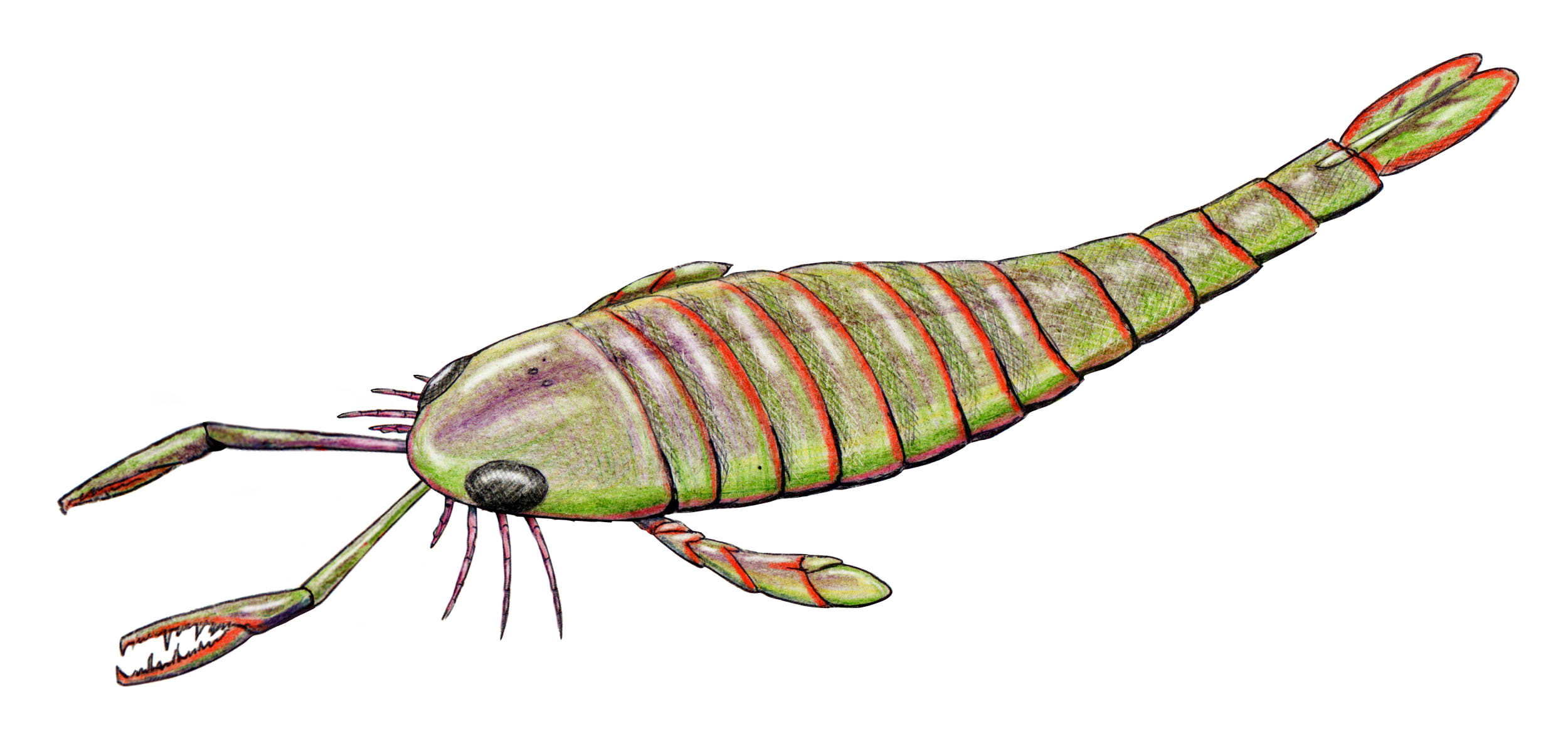
- Life restoration of the Silurian-Early Devonian eurypterid ("sea scorpion") Erettopterus
  †Erettopterus
  - †Erettopterus saetiger
- †Eridoconcha
  - †Eridoconcha rugosa
- †Eridorthis
- †Eridotrypa
- †Erisocrinus
  - †Erisocrinus typus
- †Erpetosaurus
  - †Erpetosaurus radiatus – type locality for species
- †Escharopora
- †Estiastra
  - †Estiastra culcita
  - †Estiastra dilatostella
  - †Estiastra rugosa
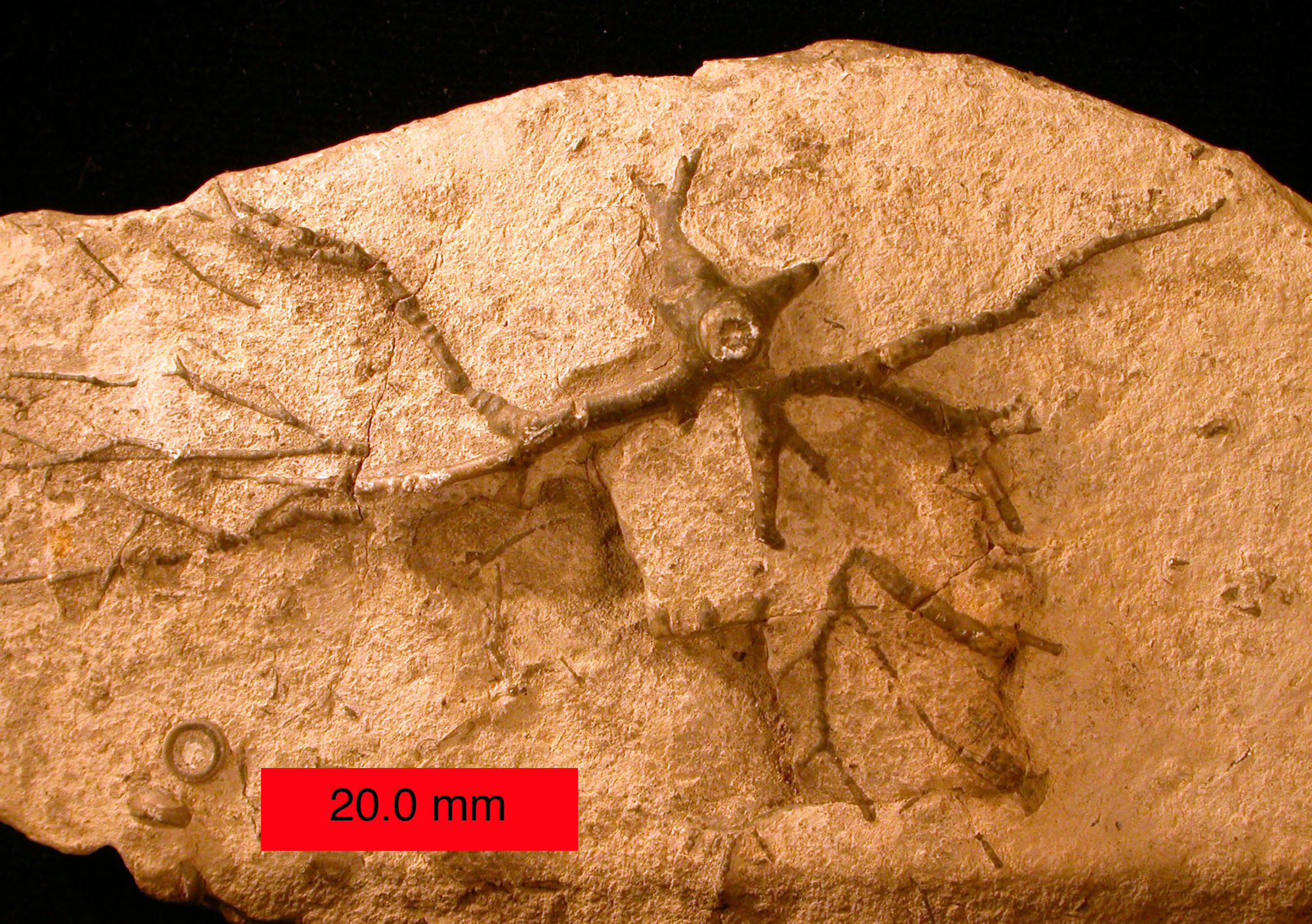
- Fossilized holdfast found in Ohio of the Silurian-Middle Devonian crinoid ("sea lily") Eucalyptocrinites
  †Eucalyptocrinites
- †Euchondria
  - †Euchondria neglecta
  - †Euchondria ohioensis – type locality for species
  - †Euchondria pellucida
- †Euconospira
  - †Euconospira turbiniformis
- †Eunicites
- †Euomphalus
  - †Euomphalus planodorsatus
  - †Euomphalus similis
- †Euphemites
  - †Euphemites carbonarius
  - †Euphemites enodis – type locality for species
  - †Euphemites multiliratus – type locality for species
  - †Euphemites nodocarinatus
  - †Euphemites subglobosus
  - †Euphemites vittatus
- †Eurymya
- †Euryocrinus – tentative report
  - †Euryocrinus laddii
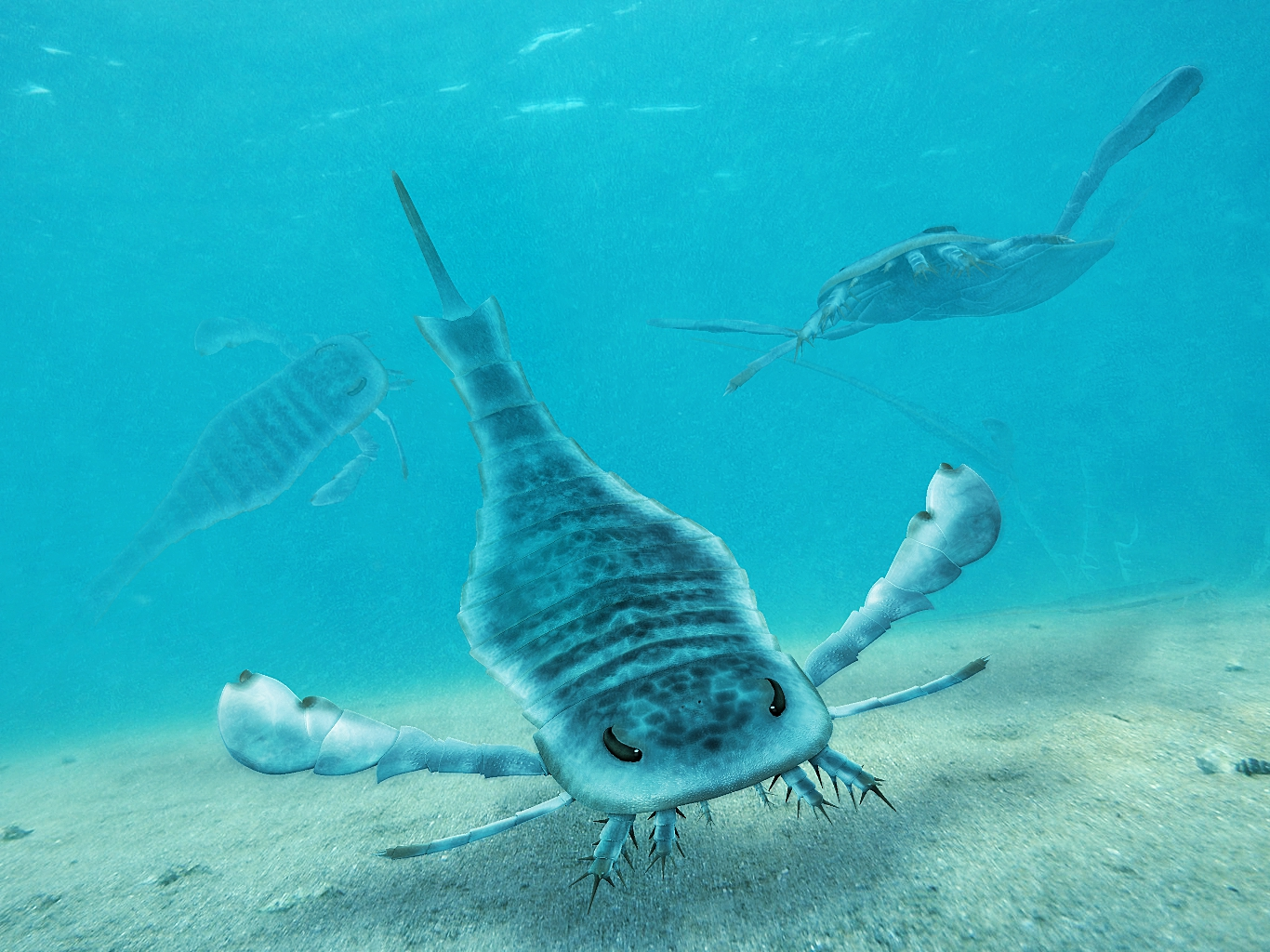
- Life restoration of Silurian eurypterid ("sea scorpion") Eurypterus
  †Eurypterus
  - †Eurypterus ornatus
- †Eusauropleura – type locality for genus
  - †Eusauropleura digitata – type locality for species
- †Eutaxocrinus
  - †Eutaxocrinus wideneri
- †Evenkiella
- †Exilisphaeridium
  - †Exilisphaeridium simplex
- †Exochoderma
  - †Exochoderma irregulare
  - †Exochoderma ramibrachium

== F ==
- †Faberia
  - †Faberia anomala
- †Faberoceras
- †Favistella
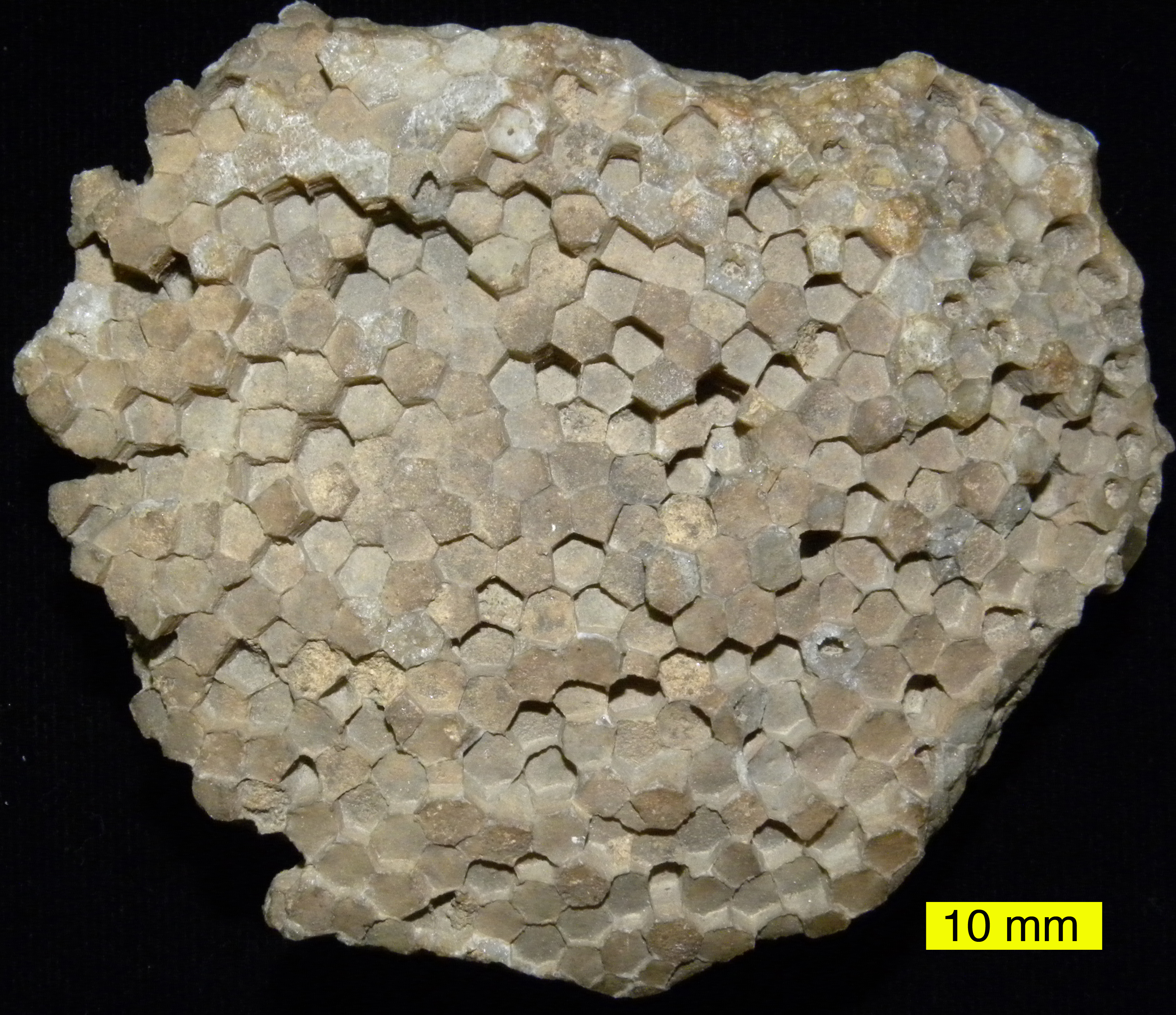
- Fossil of the Late Ordovician-Permian tabulate coral Favosites
  †Favosites
  - †Favosites dentistabulatus
  - †Favosites discoideus
  - †Favosites favosus
  - †Favosites hamiltonae
  - †Favosites hamiltoniae
  - †Favosites hisingeri
  - †Favosites turbinatus
- †Fayettoceras
- †Fenestella
  - †Fenestella shumardi
- †Fenestrellina
  - †Fenestrellina rockportensis
- †Fistulipora
  - †Fistulipora vesiculata
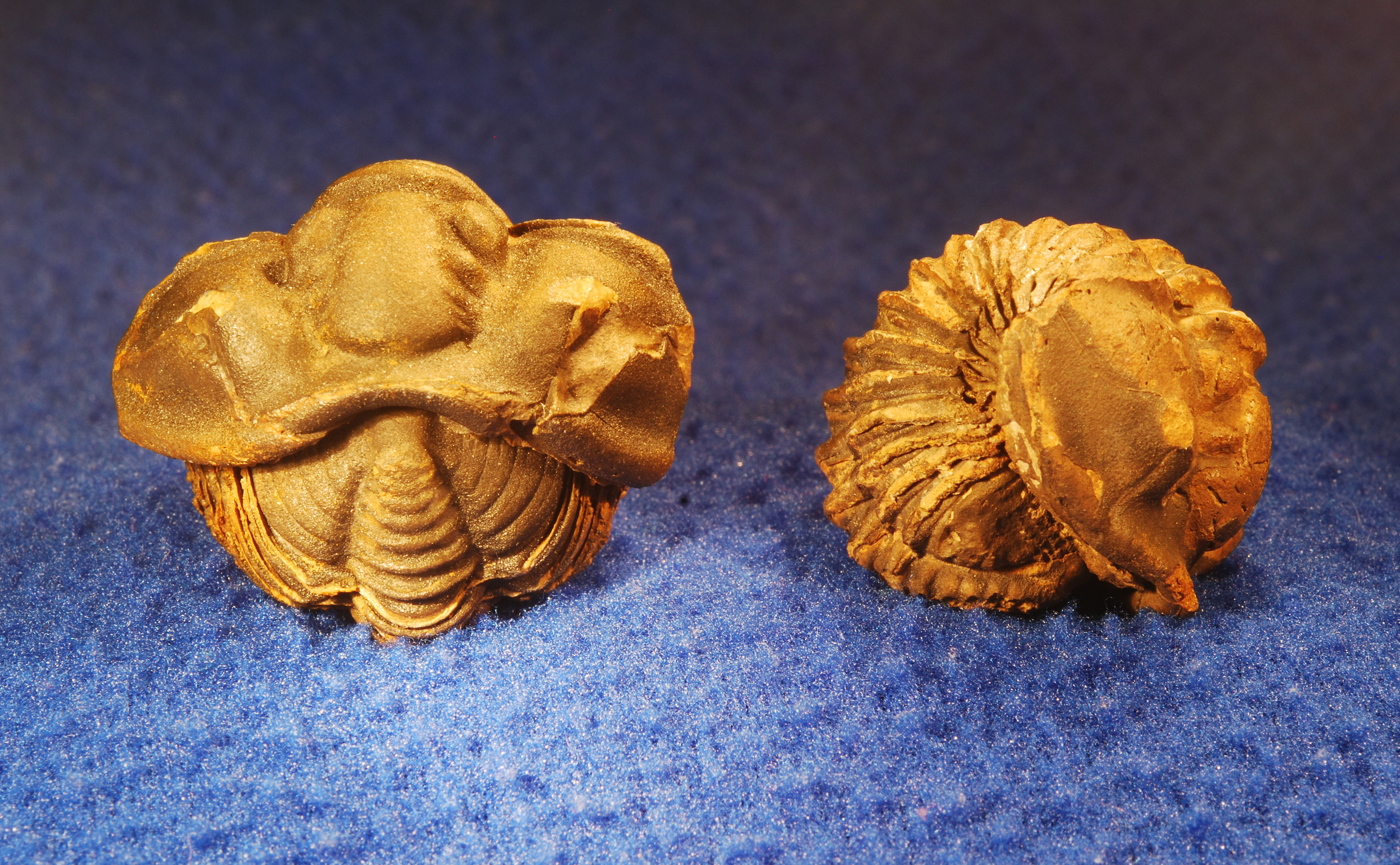
- Front (left) and right side (right) views of an enrolled fossil of the Middle Ordovician-Silurian trilobite Flexicalymene
  †Flexicalymene
  - †Flexicalymene meeki
- †Florinites
  - †Florinites florini
  - †Florinites mediapudens
  - †Florinites milloti
  - †Florinites similis
  - †Florinites visendus
- †Foerstia
  - †Foerstia ohioensis
- †Fusispira
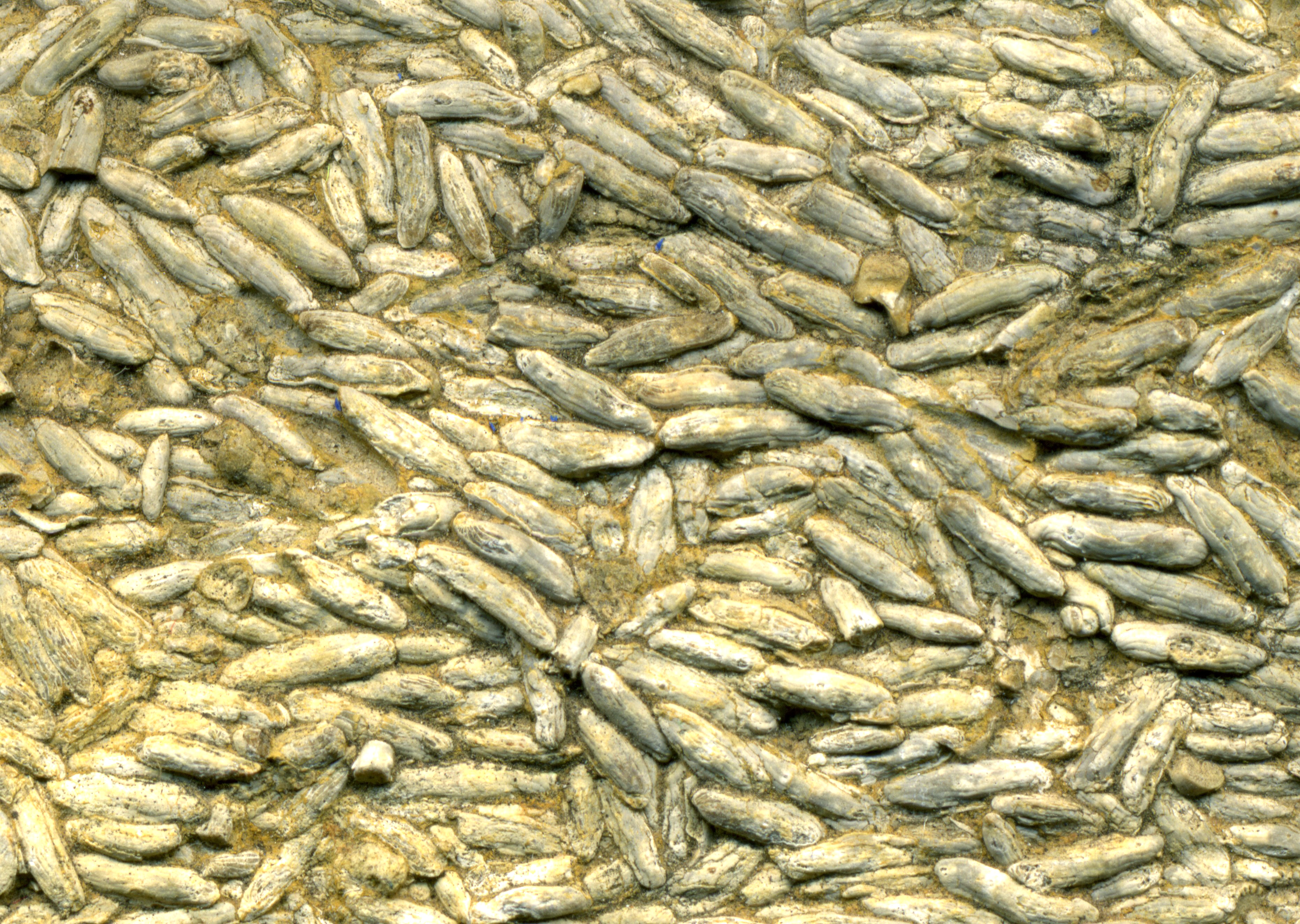
- Assemblage of fossils of Silurian-Permian fusulinid foraminiferans
  †Fusulina
  - †Fusulina secalica

0 Links

== G ==
- †Gamizyga
  - †Gamizyga corpulentissima
  - †Gamizyga girtyi – type locality for species
  - †Gamizyga morningstarae
- †Gerablattina
  - †Gerablattina richmondiana – type locality for species
- †Gigantopteris – or unidentified comparable form
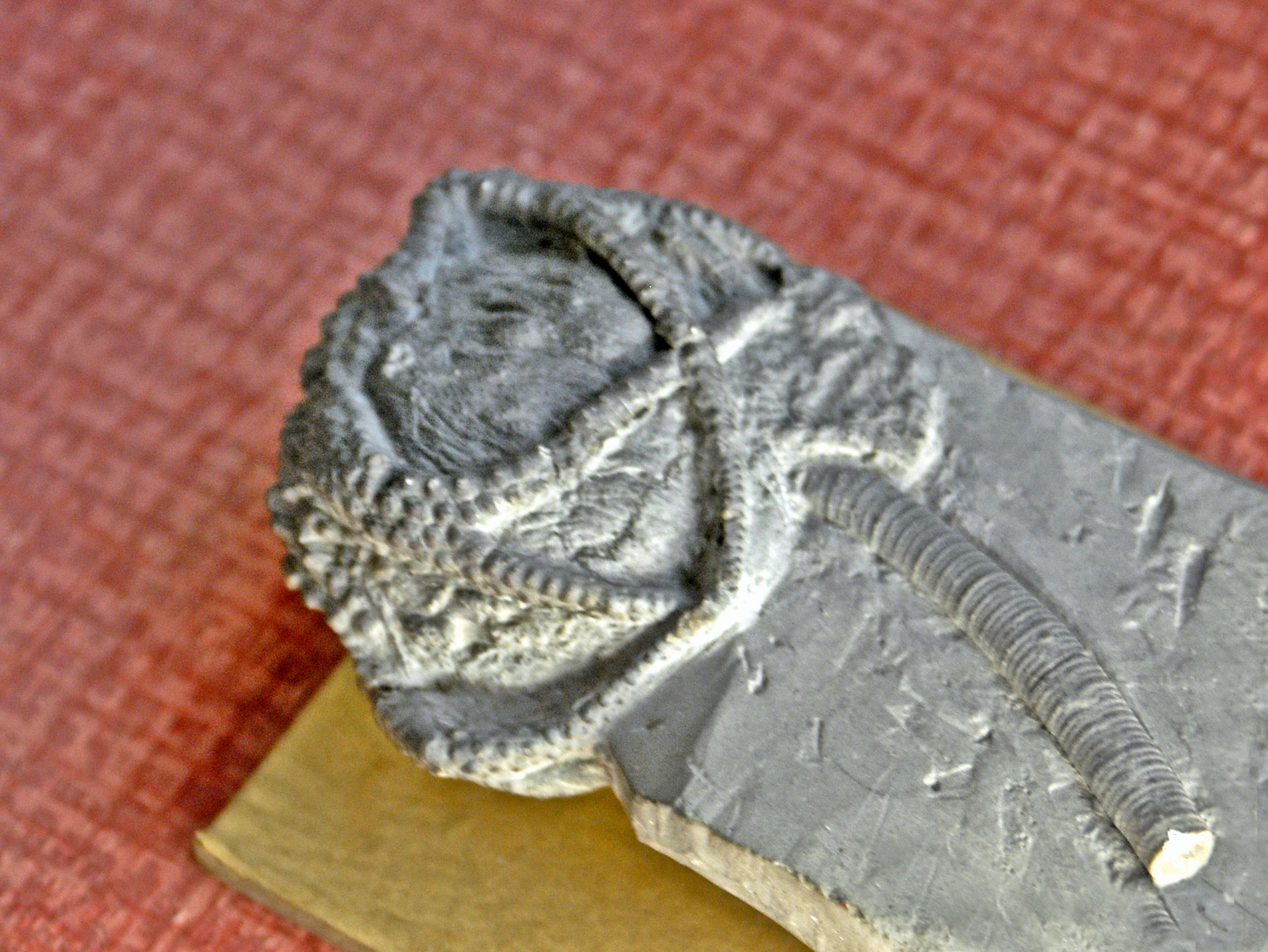
- Fossilized calyx and partial stem of the Devonian-Carboniferous crinoid ("sea lily") Gilbertsocrinus
  †Gilbertsocrinus
  - †Gilbertsocrinus alpenensis
  - †Gilbertsocrinus ohioensis
- †Gillespieisporites
  - †Gillespieisporites venustus
- †Girtyspira
  - †Girtyspira minuta
- †Glabrocingulum
  - †Glabrocingulum beedei – type locality for species
  - †Glabrocingulum grayvillense
  - †Glabrocingulum stellaeformis
  - †Glabrocingulum wannense – or unidentified comparable form
- †Globodoma
  - †Globodoma nodosa
- †Globozyga
  - †Globozyga reticulata
  - †Globozyga subcorpulenta – type locality for species
- †Glossites
  - †Glossites subtenuis
- †Glyptocardia
  - †Glyptocardia speciosa
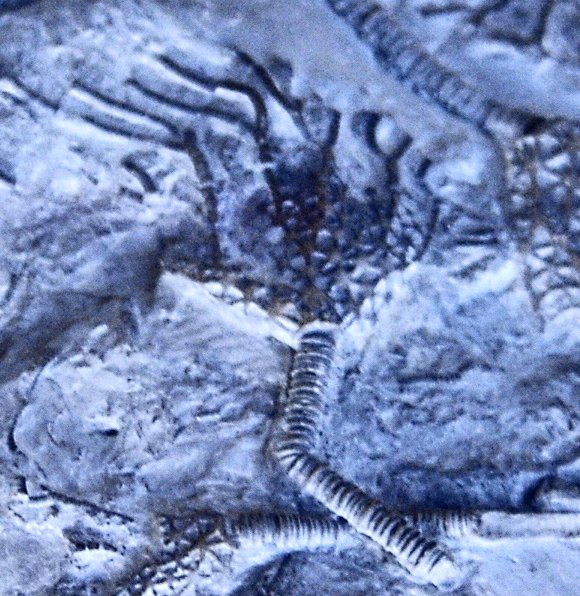
- Assemblage of fossils of the Middle Ordovician-Silurian crinoid ("sea lily") Glyptocrinus
  †Glyptocrinus
  - †Glyptocrinus richardsoni
- †Glyptorthis
  - †Glyptorthis daytonensis – type locality for species
  - †Glyptorthis fausta – type locality for species
  - †Glyptorthis insculpta
- †Gomphostrobus
- †Goniasma
  - †Goniasma lasallense – or unidentified comparable form
- †Gonioloboceras
- †Gorbyoceras
- †Gorogonisphaeridium
  - †Gorogonisphaeridium absitum
  - †Gorogonisphaeridium elongatum
  - †Gorogonisphaeridium evexispinosum
  - †Gorogonisphaeridium ohioense
  - †Gorogonisphaeridium plerispinosum
  - †Gorogonisphaeridium separatum
- †Gosseletia
  - †Gosseletia triquetra
- †Gosselettia
  - †Gosselettia triquetra
- †Graciloceras
- †Grammysia
  - †Grammysia arcuata
  - †Grammysia bellatula
  - †Grammysia bisulcata
  - †Grammysia constricta
  - †Grammysia nodocostata
  - †Grammysia sylvanensis
- †Grammysioidea
- †Granasporites
  - †Granasporites medius
- †Granulatisporites
  - †Granulatisporites granulatus
  - †Granulatisporites minutus
  - †Granulatisporites parvus
  - †Granulatisporites piroformis
- †Graptodictya
  - †Graptodictya perelegans
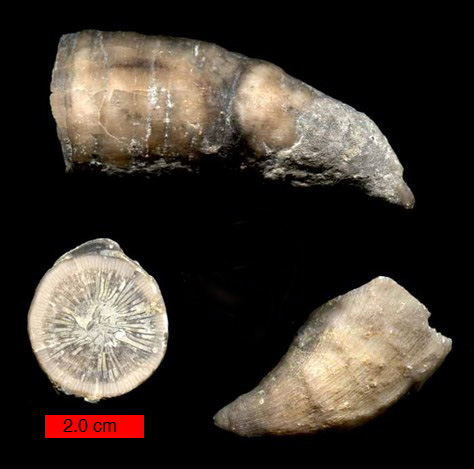
- Multiple views of a fossil of the Ordovician horn coral Grewingkia
  †Grewingkia
  - †Grewingkia rusticum
- †Guttatisphaeridium
  - †Guttatisphaeridium pandum
- †Gypidula

== H ==
- †Habrostroma
  - †Habrostroma beachvillensis
  - †Habrostroma larocquei
  - †Habrostroma marpleae
- †Hallinetes
  - †Hallinetes setigera
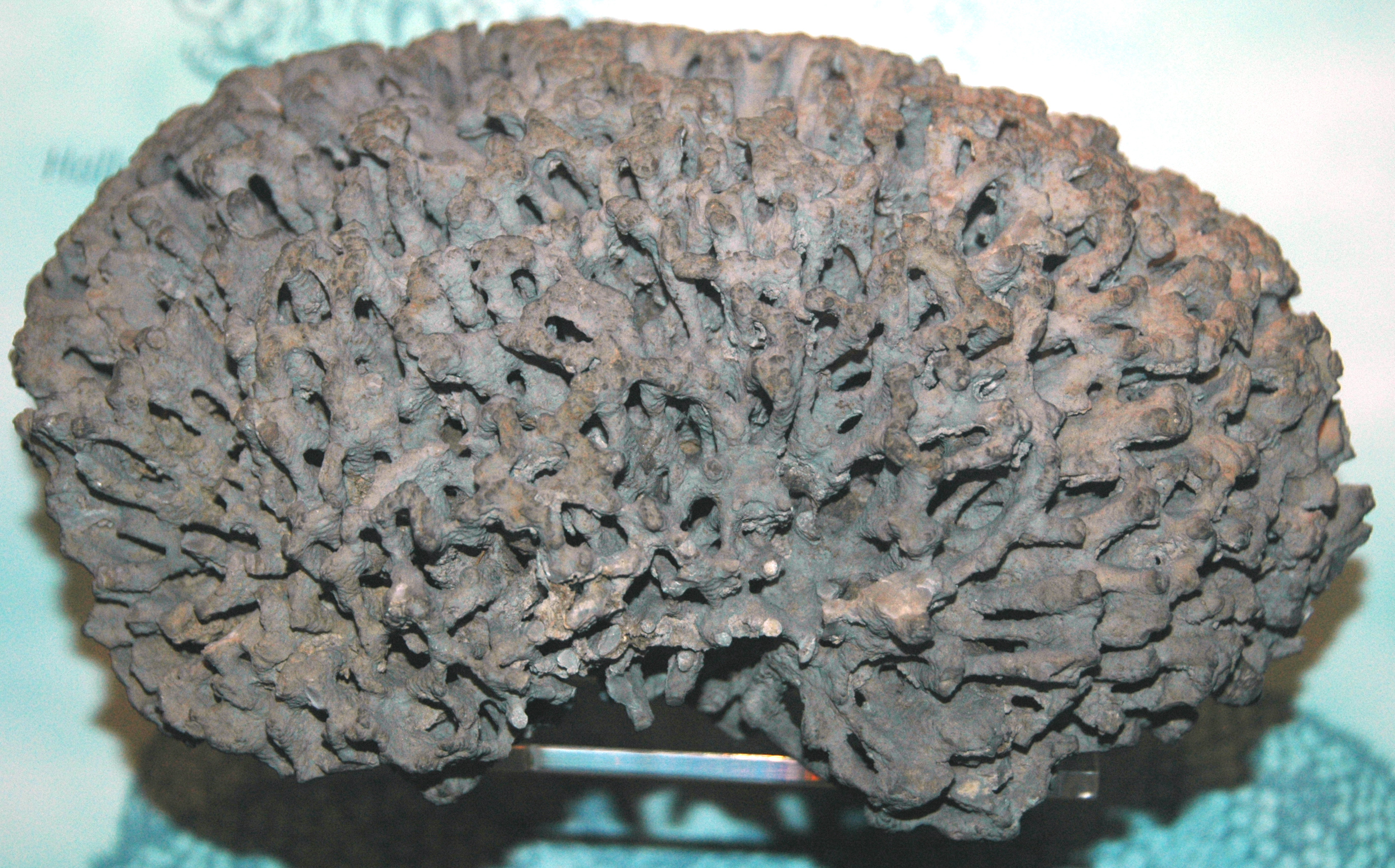
- Fossil of the Ordovician bryozoan ("moss animal") Hallopora
  †Hallopora
  - †Hallopora bassleri
  - †Hallopora flabellaris
  - †Hallopora libana
  - †Hallopora nicklesi
  - †Hallopora subnodosa
- †Halysites
  - †Halysites catenularis
  - †Halysites catenularius
  - †Halysites nitidus
- †Hamiltonella
  - †Hamiltonella punctulifera
- †Haplentactinia
  - †Haplentactinia arrhinia
  - †Haplentactinia rhinophyusa
- †Hawletrochus
  - †Hawletrochus macrostomus
- †Hebertella
  - †Hebertella alveata
  - †Hebertella occidentalis
  - †Hebertella sinuata
  - †Hebertella subjugata
- †Hebertocaris
  - †Hebertocaris wideneri
- †Hederella
  - †Hederella alpenensis
  - †Hederella bilineata
  - †Hederella cirrhosa
  - †Hederella concinnoides
  - †Hederella delicatula
  - †Hederella filiformis
  - †Hederella magna
  - †Hederella parvirugosa
  - †Hederella rectifurcata
  - †Hederella reimanni
  - †Hederella thedfordensis
  - †Hederella vagans
- †Helcionopsis
- †Helicelasma
  - †Helicelasma rusticum
- †Helicotoma
- †Heliolites
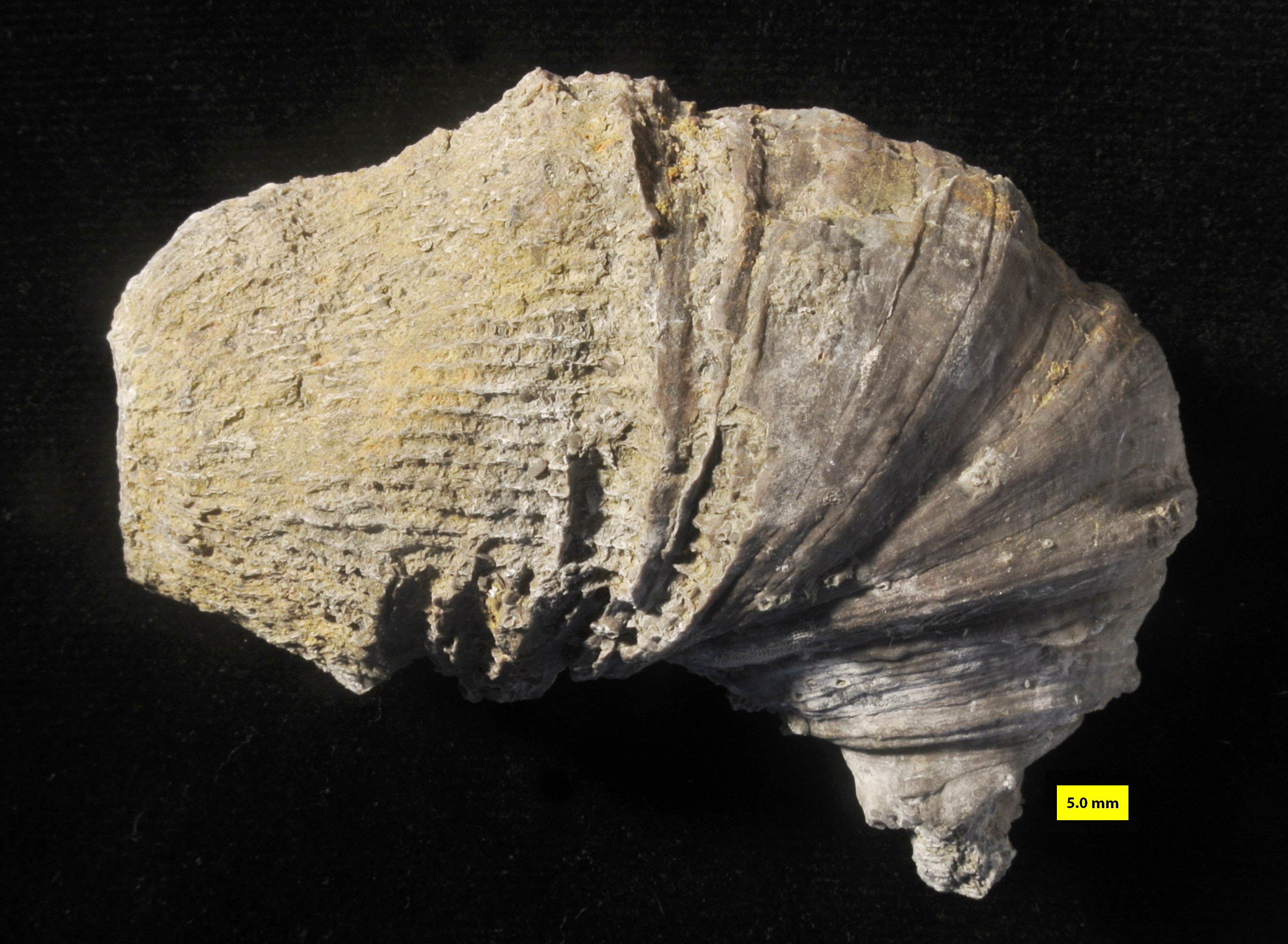
- Fossil of the Middle Devonian horn coral Heliophyllum
  †Heliophyllum
  - †Heliophyllum bathycalyx
  - †Heliophyllum halli
  - †Heliophyllum microcarinatum
- †Helminthochiton
  - †Helminthochiton simplex
- †Helminthozyga
  - †Helminthozyga costellata – type locality for species
  - †Helminthozyga undulata – type locality for species
- †Helopora
  - †Helopora inexpectata
- †Hemicystites
- †Hemiphragma
- †Hemizyga
  - †Hemizyga attenuata
  - †Hemizyga elegans – or unidentified comparable form
  - †Hemizyga illineata – or unidentified comparable form
- †Heracloceras – tentative report
  - †Heracloceras inelegans – tentative report
- †Hercostrophia
  - †Hercostrophia robusta
- †Heslerodus
  - †Heslerodus divergens
- †Hessonia
  - †Hessonia priscus
- †Heterocrinus
  - †Heterocrinus exiguus
  - †Heterocrinus exilis
  - †Heterocrinus heterodactylus
  - †Heterocrinus juvenis
  - †Heterocrinus pentagonus
- †Heteronema – tentative report
- †Heterophrentis
  - †Heterophrentis simplex
- †Heterorthina
  - †Heterorthina fairmountensis
- †Heterotrypa
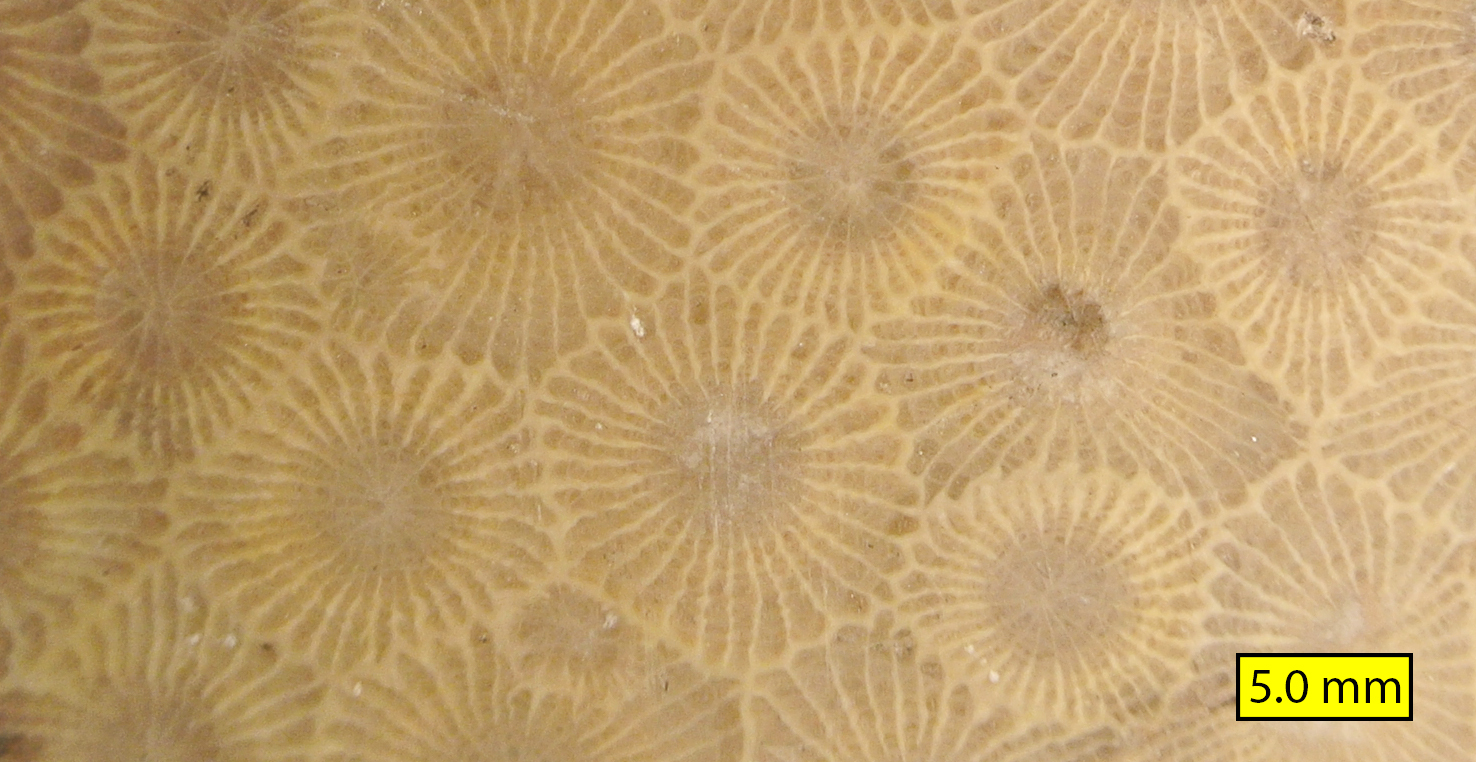
- Fossil of the Devonian colonial rugose coral Hexagonaria, also known as a Petoskey stone
  †Hexagonaria
  - †Hexagonaria anna
  - †Hexagonaria stewartae
  - †Hexagonaria tabulata
  - †Hexagonaria truncata
- †Hexameroceras
- †Hindella
- †Hindia
- †Hippocardia
  - †Hippocardia herricki – type locality for species
  - †Hippocardia hydei – type locality for species
  - †Hippocardia monroica
  - †Hippocardia ohioense
- †Hiscobeccus
  - †Hiscobeccus capax
- †Hoareicardia
  - †Hoareicardia cunea
- †Holoeciscus
  - †Holoeciscus auceps
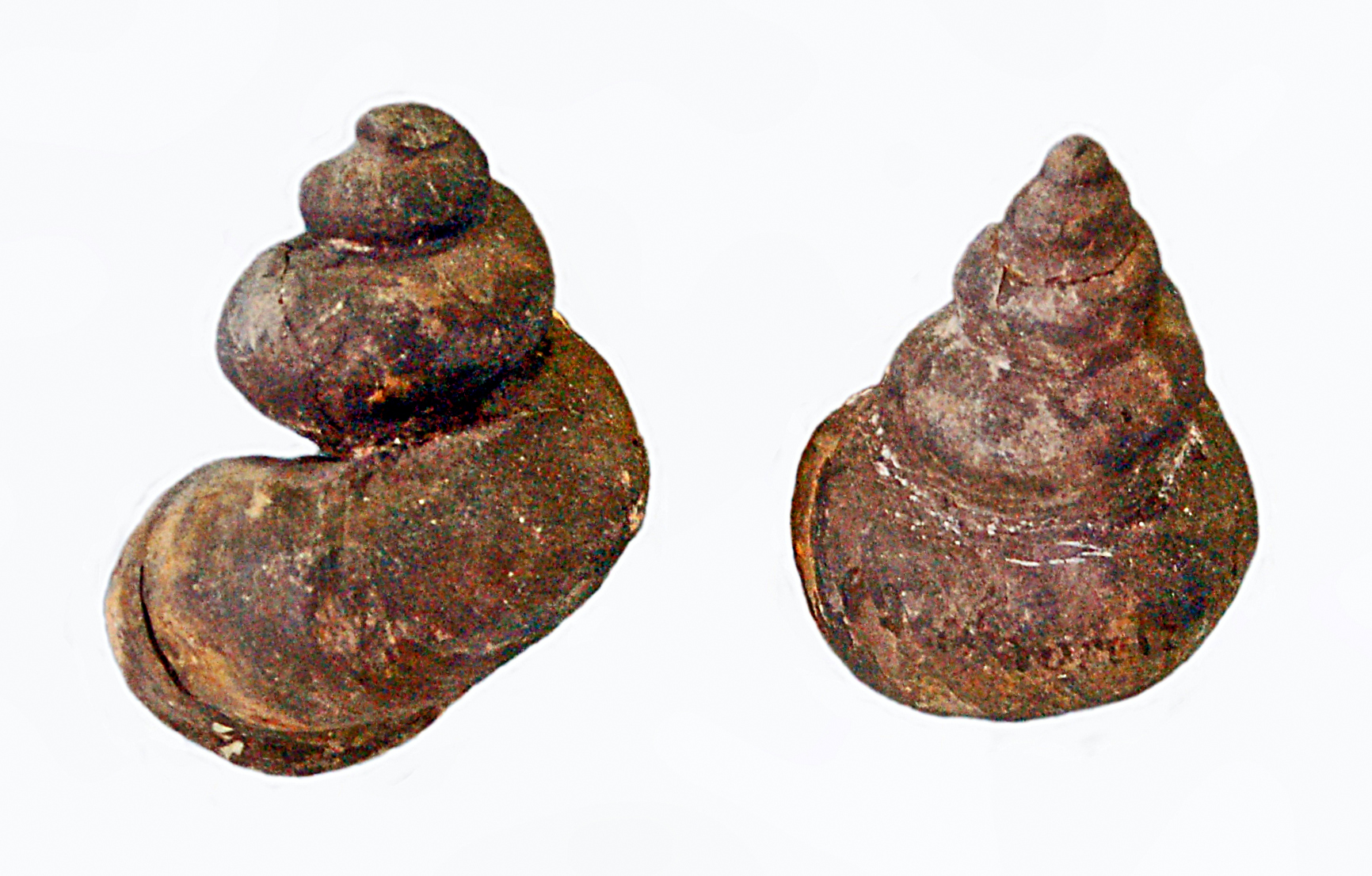
- Fossilized shells of the Ordovician-Carboniferous sea snail Holopea
  †Holopea
- †Holoptychus – or unidentified comparable form
- †Holtedahlina
  - †Holtedahlina sulcata
- †Homotrypa
  - †Homotrypa wortheni
- †Homotrypella
  - †Homotrypella dubia
- †Hormotoma
  - †Hormotoma centervillensis – type locality for species
- †Hormotomina
  - †Hormotomina maia
- †Hudsonaster
  - †Hudsonaster incomptus
- †Hustedia
  - †Hustedia mormoni
- †Hyattidina
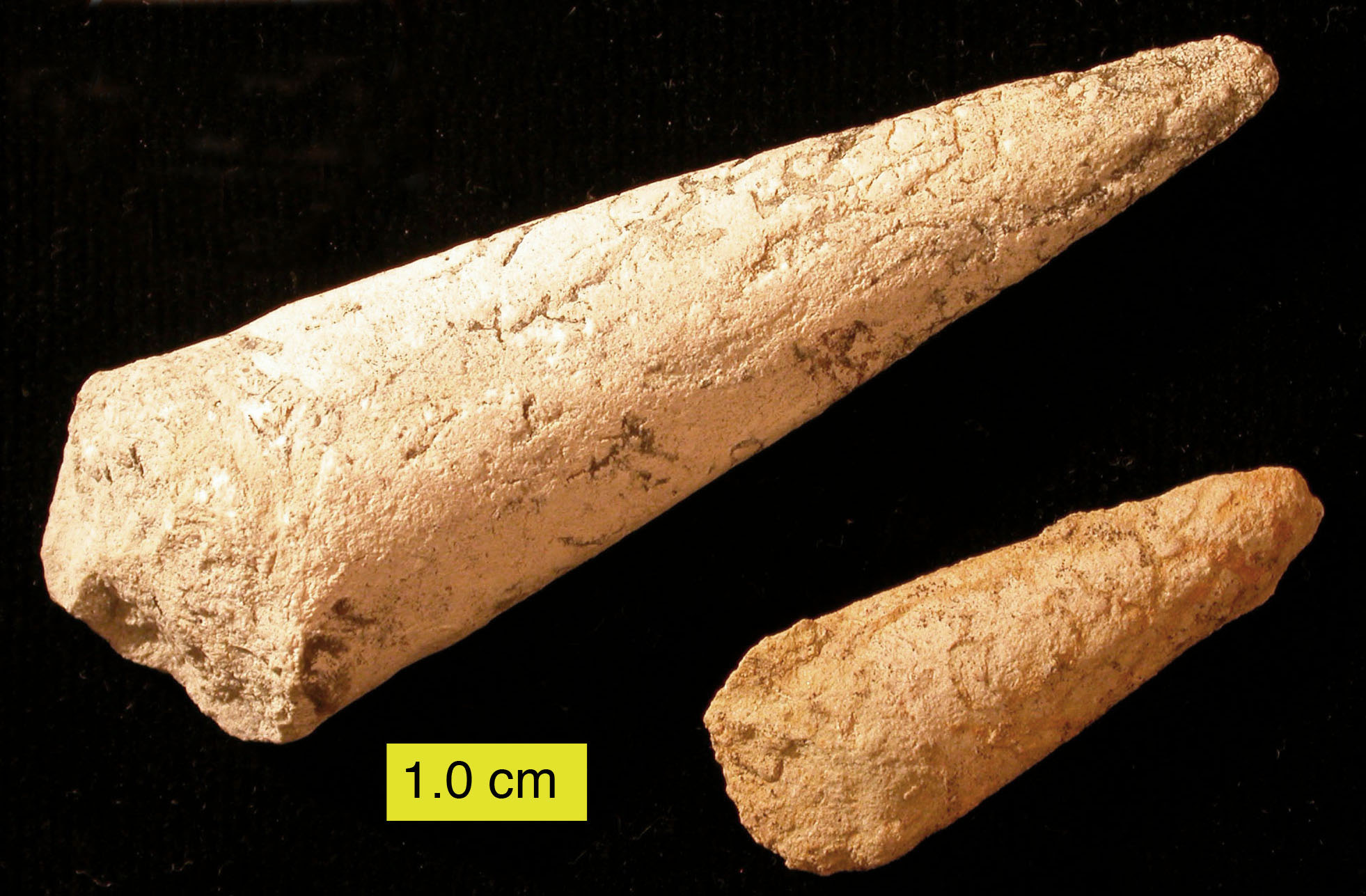
- Fossilized shells of the Cambrian-Permian brachiopod relative Hyolitha
  †Hyolithes
  - †Hyolithes dubius
  - †Hyolithes parviusculus
  - †Hyolithes versaillensis
- †Hypergonia
  - †Hypergonia jonathanensis – type locality for species
- †Hyperoblastus
  - †Hyperoblastus reimanni
- †Hyphantozyga
  - †Hyphantozyga cancellata – type locality for species
  - †Hyphantozyga fusiforma – type locality for species
  - †Hyphantozyga gracilis
  - †Hyphantozyga grandis – type locality for species
  - †Hyphantozyga knighti
  - †Hyphantozyga perattenuata
  - †Hyphantozyga pulchra
  - †Hyphantozyga textilis – type locality for species
- †Hypselentoma
  - †Hypselentoma inornata
- †Hystriculina
  - †Hystriculina wabashensis

== I ==
- †Ianthinopsis
  - †Ianthinopsis melanoides – type locality for species
- †Ibanocrinus
  - †Ibanocrinus petalos
- †Ichthyerpeton
  - †Ichthyerpeton squamosum – type locality for species
- †Icriodus
  - †Icriodus angustus
  - †Icriodus arkonensis
  - †Icriodus brevis
  - †Icriodus eriensis
  - †Icriodus excavatus
  - †Icriodus expansus
  - †Icriodus janeae
  - †Icriodus lindensis
  - †Icriodus obliquimarginatus
  - †Icriodus ohioensis
  - †Icriodus platyobliquimarginatus
  - †Icriodus regularicrescens
- †Indospora
  - †Indospora stewartii
- †Intrapora
  - †Intrapora irregularis
- †Iocrinus
- †Ischyrodonta
  - †Ischyrodonta truncata
  - †Ischyrodonta unionoides
- †Isodectes
  - †Isodectes obtusus – type locality for species
- †Isonema
  - †Isonema depressum
- †Isorophus
  - †Isorophus austini
  - †Isorophus holbrooki
  - †Isorophus warrenensis
- †Isorthoceras
  - †Isorthoceras albersi
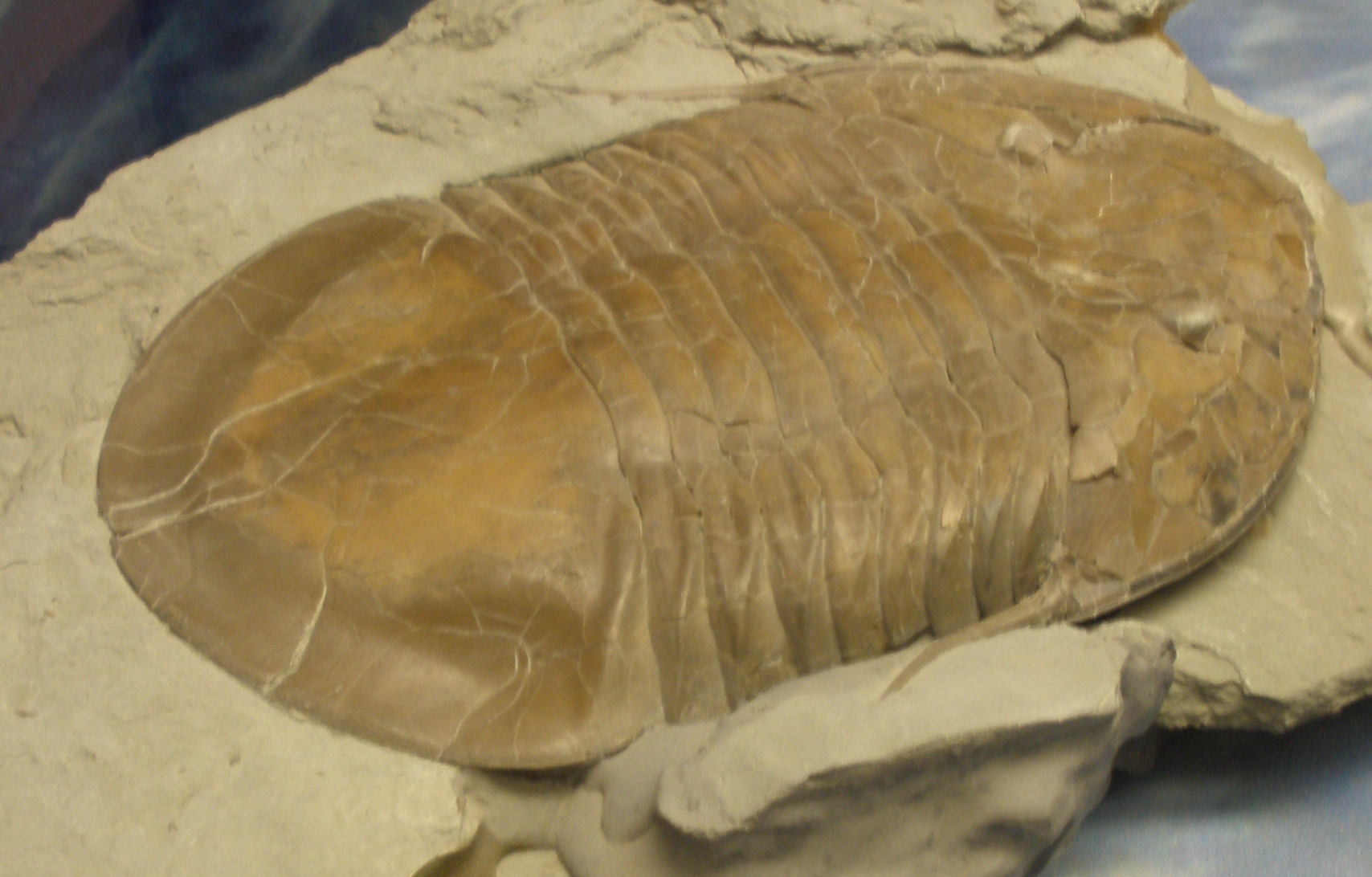
- Fossil of the Middle-Late Ordovician giant trilobite Isotelus. Isotelus is the state fossil of Ohio.
  †Isotelus
  - †Isotelus maximus
  - †Isotelus megistos

== J ==
- †Jedria
  - †Jedria ventrica
- †Jonesella
  - †Jonesella crepidiformis
  - †Jonesella pedigera
- †Jonesites
  - †Jonesites inornatus
  - †Jonesites marginatus
- †Jugiaster
  - †Jugiaster speciosus
- †Juresania
  - †Juresania ovalis

== K ==
- †Kindleoceras
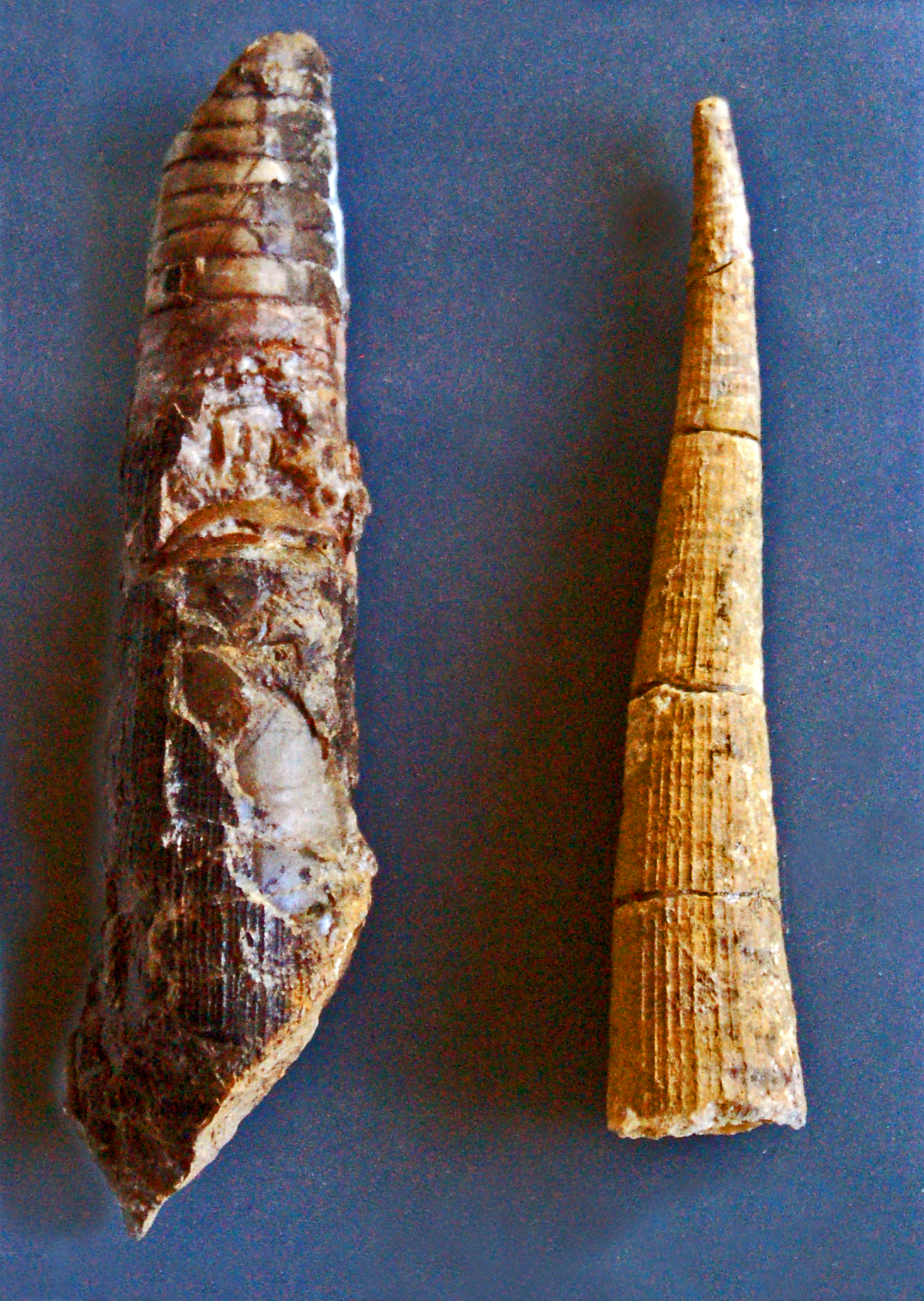
- Fossilized shells of the Middle Ordovician-Permian nautiloid cephalopod Kionoceras
  †Kionoceras
- †Kockelella
  - †Kockelella ortus
  - †Kockelella ranuliformis
  - †Kockelella walliseri
- †Kophinocrinus – tentative report
  - †Kophinocrinus magrumi – tentative report
- †Kyreocrinus
  - †Kyreocrinus constellatus

== L ==
- †Labechia
- †Laccoprimitia
  - †Laccoprimitia centralis
- †Laevigatosporites
  - †Laevigatosporites desmoinesensis
  - †Laevigatosporites globosus
  - †Laevigatosporites medius
  - †Laevigatosporites minimus
  - †Laevigatosporites minor
  - †Laevigatosporites ovalis
  - †Laevigatosporites subadnatoides
  - †Laevigatosporites vulgaris
- †Lambeoceras
- †Lanthanaster
  - †Lanthanaster cruciformis – type locality for species
- †Lasiograptus
- †Latericriodus
  - †Latericriodus latericrescens
- †Latosporites
  - †Latosporites minutus
- †Lechritrochoceras
- †Leioclema
  - †Leioclema alpenense
  - †Leioclema alpense
- †Leiorhynchus
  - †Leiorhynchus kelloggi
  - †Leiorhynchus laura
  - †Leiorhynchus lucasi
- †Leiosphaeridia
- †Leiotriletes
  - †Leiotriletes granoornatus
  - †Leiotriletes levis
  - †Leiotriletes microsaetosus
  - †Leiotriletes pseudaculeatus
  - †Leiotriletes subadnatoides
- †Lepadocystis
- †Leperditia
  - †Leperditia glabra
- †Lepidocoleus
- †Lepidocyclus
  - †Lepidocyclus perlamellosum
- †Lepidocystis
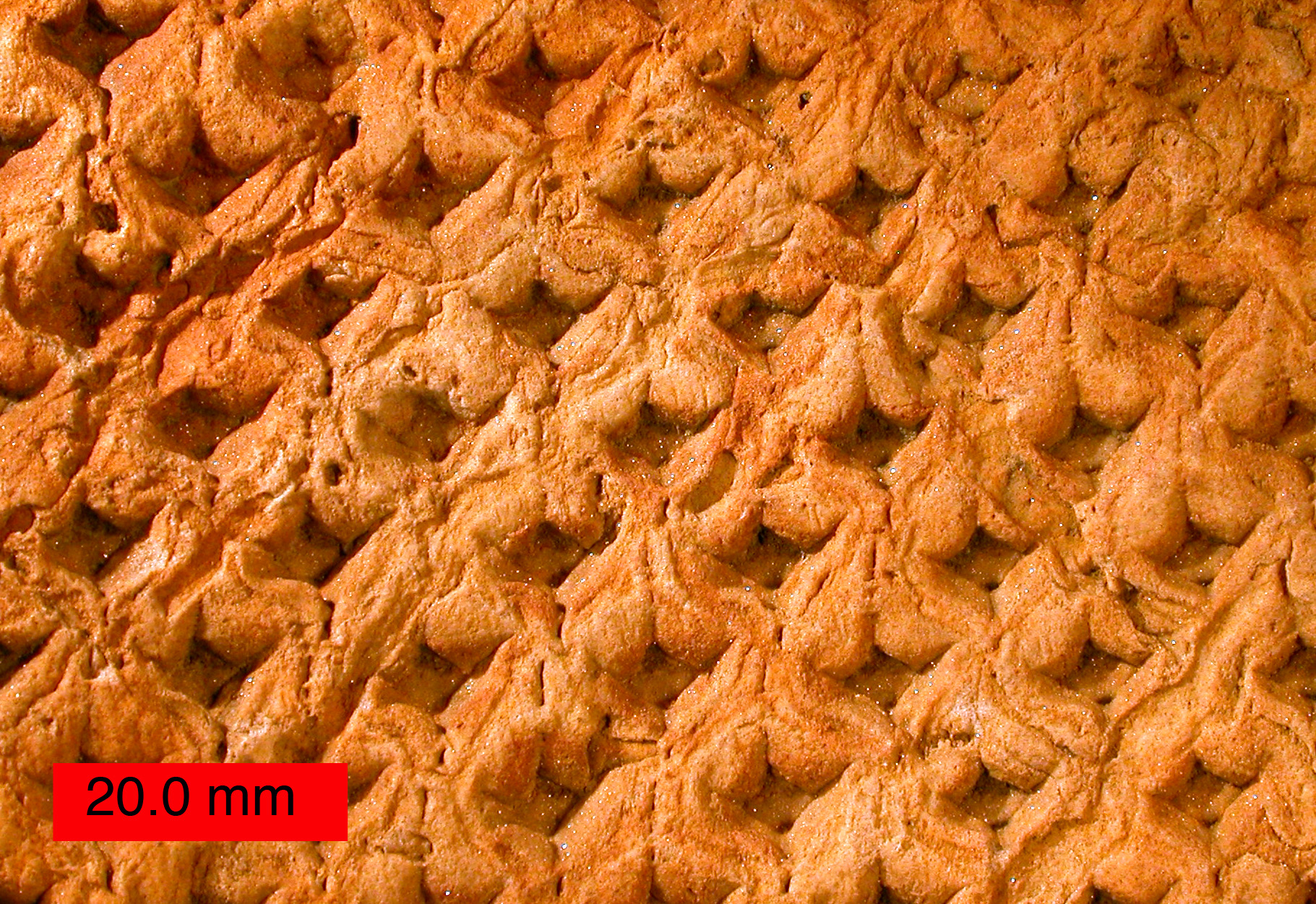
- External mold fossil found in Ohio of the Carboniferous tree-sized club moss relative Lepidodendron
  †Lepidodendron
  - †Lepidodendron aculeatum
  - †Lepidodendron andrewsi
  - †Lepidodendron jaraczewskii – or unidentified comparable form
  - †Lepidodendron scutatum
- †Lepidolites
- †Lepidophloios
  - †Lepidophloios larcinus
  - †Lepidophloios vaningeni
- †Lepidostrobophyllum
- †Leptaena
  - †Leptaena gibbosa
  - †Leptaena richmondensis
- †Leptobolus
  - †Leptobolus insignis
- †Leptodesma
  - †Leptodesma ausablensis
  - †Leptodesma matheri – or unidentified comparable form
  - †Leptodesma rhysema – type locality for species
- †Leptograptus
- †Leptophractus – type locality for genus
  - †Leptophractus obsoletus – type locality for species
- †Leptopoterion
- †Leptoptygma
  - †Leptoptygma newtonensis – type locality for species
- †Leptotrypa
- †Leptotrypella
  - †Leptotrypella ohioensis
- †Lescuropteris
  - †Lescuropteris moorii
- †Levizygopleura
  - †Levizygopleura inornata
  - †Levizygopleura williamsi
- †Lichenocrinus
  - †Lichenocrinus tuberculata
- †Limipecten
  - †Limipecten lamellus – type locality for species
- †Limoptera
  - †Limoptera curvata
  - †Limoptera macroptera
- Lingula
  - †Lingula carbonaria
  - †Lingula meeki
  - †Lingula melie
- †Lingulichnus
- †Lingulops
- †Linoproductus
  - †Linoproductus cora
  - †Linoproductus prattenianus
- †Linopteris
  - †Linopteris muensteri
  - †Linopteris neuropteroides
- †Lioclemella
- †Liospira
  - †Liospira affinis
  - †Liospira depressum – type locality for species
- †Liroceras – tentative report
- †Lodanaria
  - †Lodanaria quadricarinata – type locality for species
- †Logocrinus – tentative report
  - †Logocrinus brandoni – tentative report
- †Longispina
  - †Longispina lissohybus
- †Longstaffia – tentative report
  - †Longstaffia centervillensis – type locality for species
- †Lopholasma
  - †Lopholasma delawarensis
- †Lophonychia
  - †Lophonychia cordata
- †Lophophyllidium
  - †Lophophyllidium profundum
- †Lophospira
  - †Lophospira milleri
  - †Lophospira perangulata
- †Lophotriletes
  - †Lophotriletes granoornatus
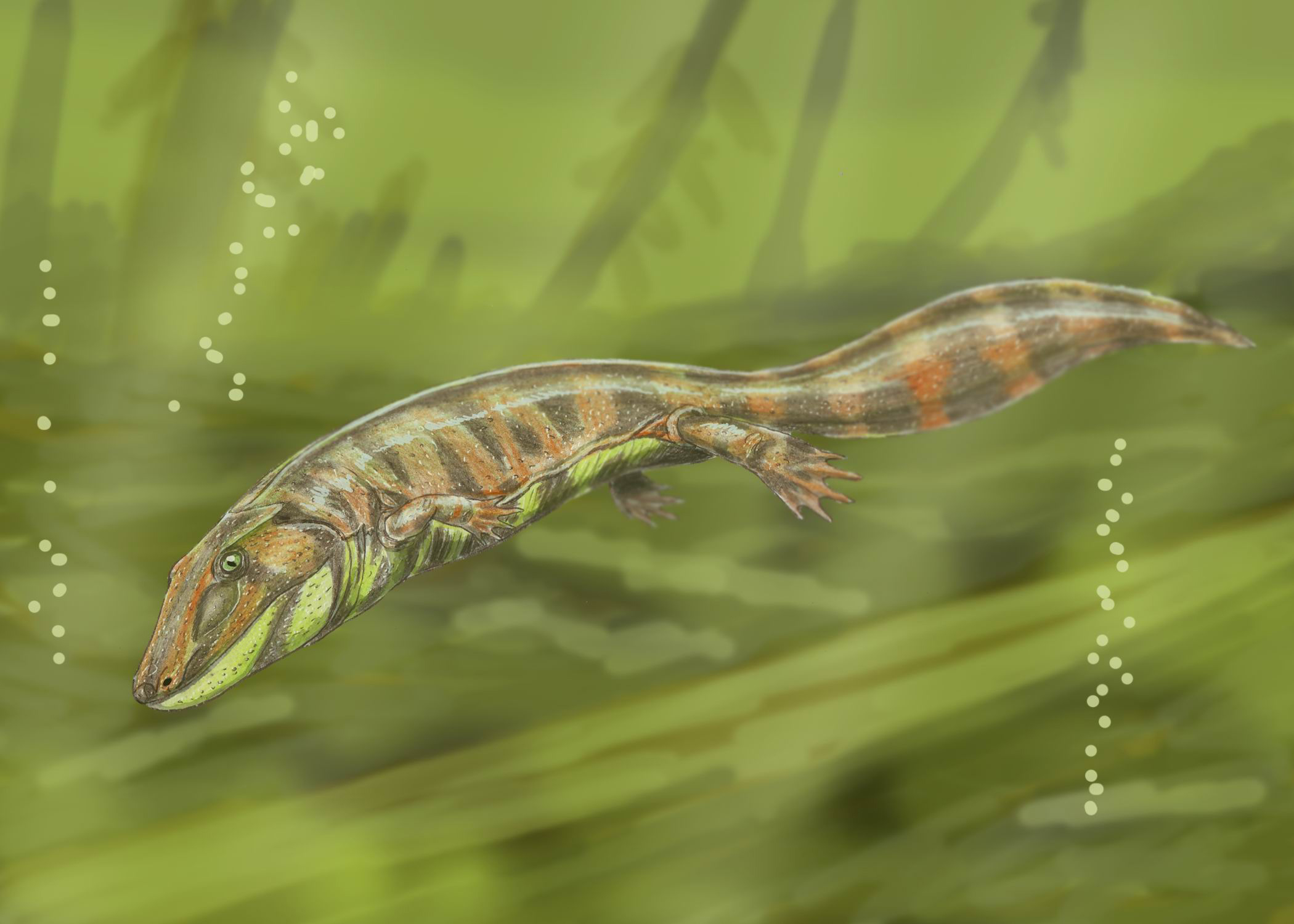
- Life restoration of the Carboniferous tetrapod Loxomma
  †Loxomma
  - †Loxomma lintonensis – type locality for species
- †Loxonema
  - †Loxonema pikensis
- †Loxoplocus
  - †Loxoplocus gothlandicus – type locality for species
- †Lycospora
  - †Lycospora granulata
  - †Lycospora micropapillata
  - †Lycospora orbicula
  - †Lycospora pellucida
  - †Lycospora pusilla
  - †Lycospora subjuga
  - †Lycospora torquifer
- †Lyopora
  - †Lyopora goldfussi
- †Lyriopecten
  - †Lyriopecten mitchelli
- †Lyrodesma
  - †Lyrodesma major

== M ==
- †Macrerpeton
  - †Macrerpeton huxleyi – type locality for species
- †Macrochilina
  - †Macrochilina humilis
- †Maelonoceras
- †Manitoulinoceras
  - †Manitoulinoceras gyroforme
  - †Manitoulinoceras williamsae
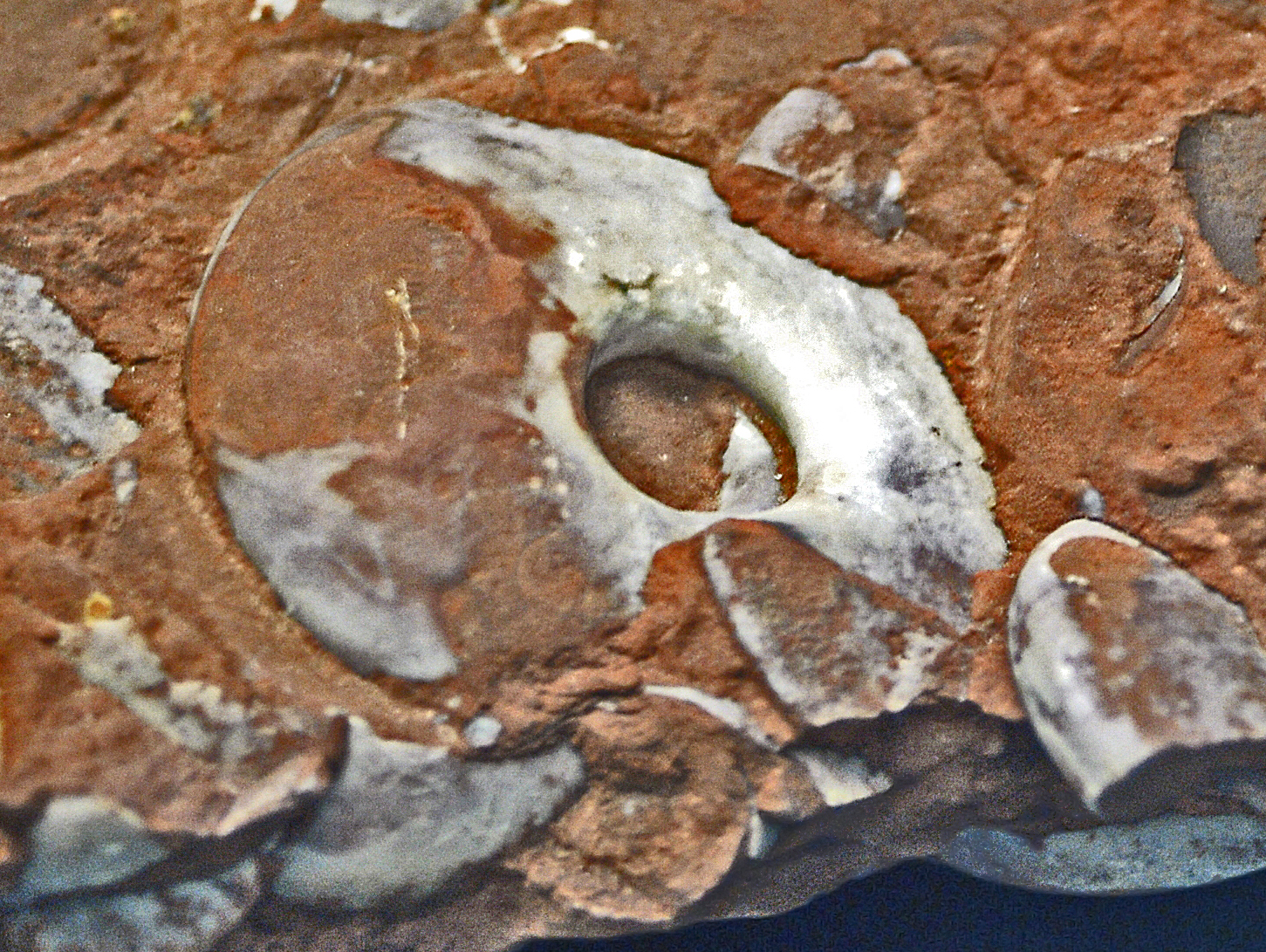
- Fossilized shell of the Devonian ammonoid cephalopod Manticoceras
  †Manticoceras
- †Manticrinus
  - †Manticrinus exaitos
- †Marsupiocrinus
- †Maryonychia
  - †Maryonychia concordensis
- †Mastigograptus
  - †Mastigograptus strictus
- †Mazostachys
  - †Mazostachys compacta – type locality for species
- †Mediospirifer
  - †Mediospirifer audaculus
- †Meekopinna
  - †Meekopinna americana
- †Meekospira
  - †Meekospira peracuta
- †Megacanthopora
  - †Megacanthopora fallacis – or unidentified comparable form
- †Megacystites
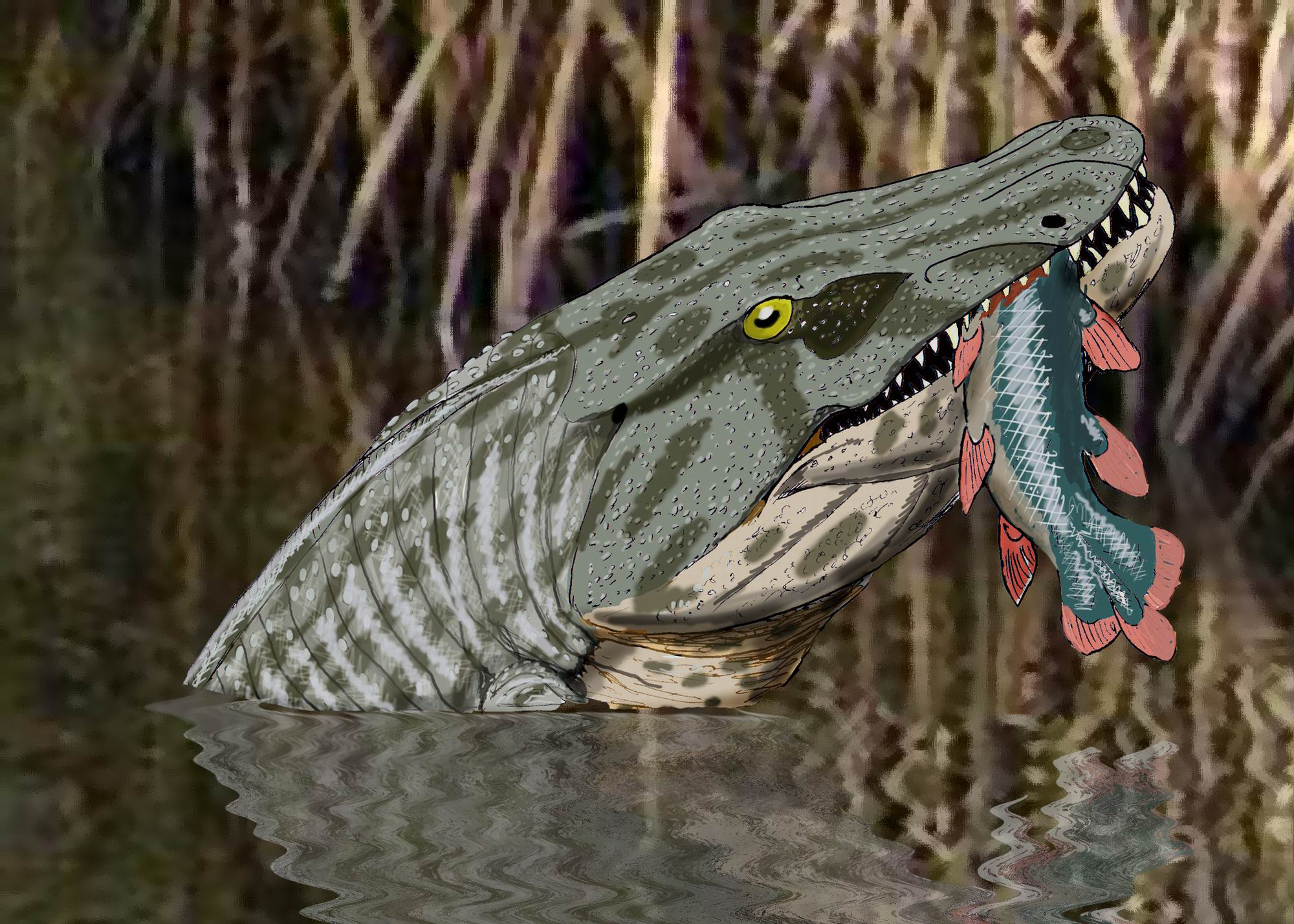
- Life restoration of the Carboniferous amphibian Megalocephalus
  †Megalocephalus – type locality for genus
  - †Megalocephalus lineolatus – type locality for species
- †Megalograptus
- †Megastrophia
  - †Megastrophia concava
- †Megistocrinus
  - †Megistocrinus depressus
- †Melocrinus
  - †Melocrinus clarkei
- †Meristospira
  - †Meristospira michiganensis
- †Merocrinus
- †Mesocoelia
  - †Mesocoelia obstipisutura
- †Mesopalaeaster
  - †Mesopalaeaster finei
  - †Mesopalaeaster wilberanus
- †Mesothyra
- †Mesotrypa
  - †Mesotrypa orbiculata
- †Metaxys
  - †Metaxys fossa – type locality for species
- †Miamoceras
- †Michelinoceras
- †Micrhystridium
  - †Micrhystridium adductum
  - †Micrhystridium complurispinosum
  - †Micrhystridium erugatum
  - †Micrhystridium flexibile
  - †Micrhystridium inusitatum
  - †Micrhystridium profusam
- †Microceras
- †Microdoma
  - †Microdoma tricarinatus
- †Microptychis
  - †Microptychis cerithiformis
  - †Microptychis expetendus
  - †Microptychis occabus – type locality for species
  - †Microptychis turbineus
- †Microreticulatisporites
  - †Microreticulatisporites harrisonii
  - †Microreticulatisporites nobilis
  - †Microreticulatisporites sulcatus
- †Milleratia
- †Mitrospermum
  - †Mitrospermum vinculum
- †Mixoneura
- †Modiolodon
  - †Modiolodon subovalis
- †Modiolopsis
  - †Modiolopsis capax
  - †Modiolopsis modiolaris
  - †Modiolopsis versaillesensis
- Modiolus
  - †Modiolus fountainensis
  - †Modiolus radiatus – type locality for species
  - †Modiolus waverliensis
- †Modiomorpha
  - †Modiomorpha concentrica
  - †Modiomorpha concentricum
  - †Modiomorpha mytiloides
  - †Modiomorpha subalata
  - †Modiomorpha subalta
- †Molgophis – type locality for genus
  - †Molgophis macrurus – type locality for species
- †Monotrypa
- †Monticulipora
- †Mourlonia
  - †Mourlonia plena
  - †Mourlonia textus
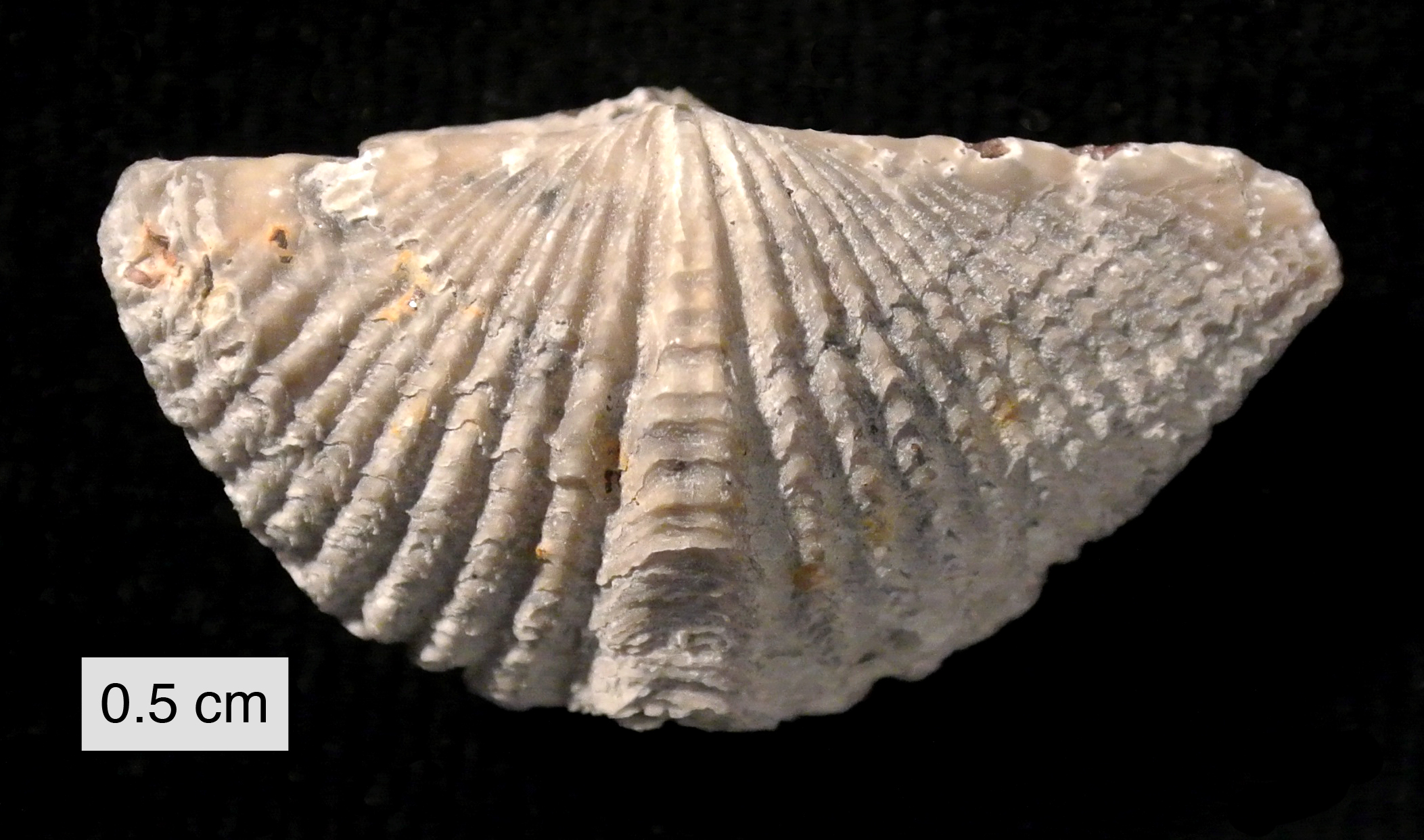
- Fossilized shell found in Paulding County of the Devonian brachiopod Mucrospirifer
  †Mucrospirifer
  - †Mucrospirifer alpenensis
  - †Mucrospirifer grabaui – or unidentified comparable form
  - †Mucrospirifer mucronatus
  - †Mucrospirifer prolificus
- †Multiplicisphaeridium
  - †Multiplicisphaeridium anastomosis
  - †Multiplicisphaeridium verrucarum
- †Muraticavea
  - †Muraticavea enteichia
- †Murchisonia
  - †Murchisonia anderdoniae
  - †Murchisonia dublinensis – type locality for species
  - †Murchisonia gracilicrista
  - †Murchisonia intermedia – type locality for species
  - †Murchisonia leda
  - †Murchisonia minuta
  - †Murchisonia sibleyensis
  - †Murchisonia subcarinata
  - †Murchisonia subulata
- †Myalina
  - †Myalina pernaformis
- †Myelodactylus – or unidentified comparable form
- †Mytilarca
  - †Mytilarca cordata

== N ==
- †Naevisphaeridium
  - †Naevisphaeridium plenilunium
- †Narthecoceras
  - †Narthecoceras dunni – type locality for species
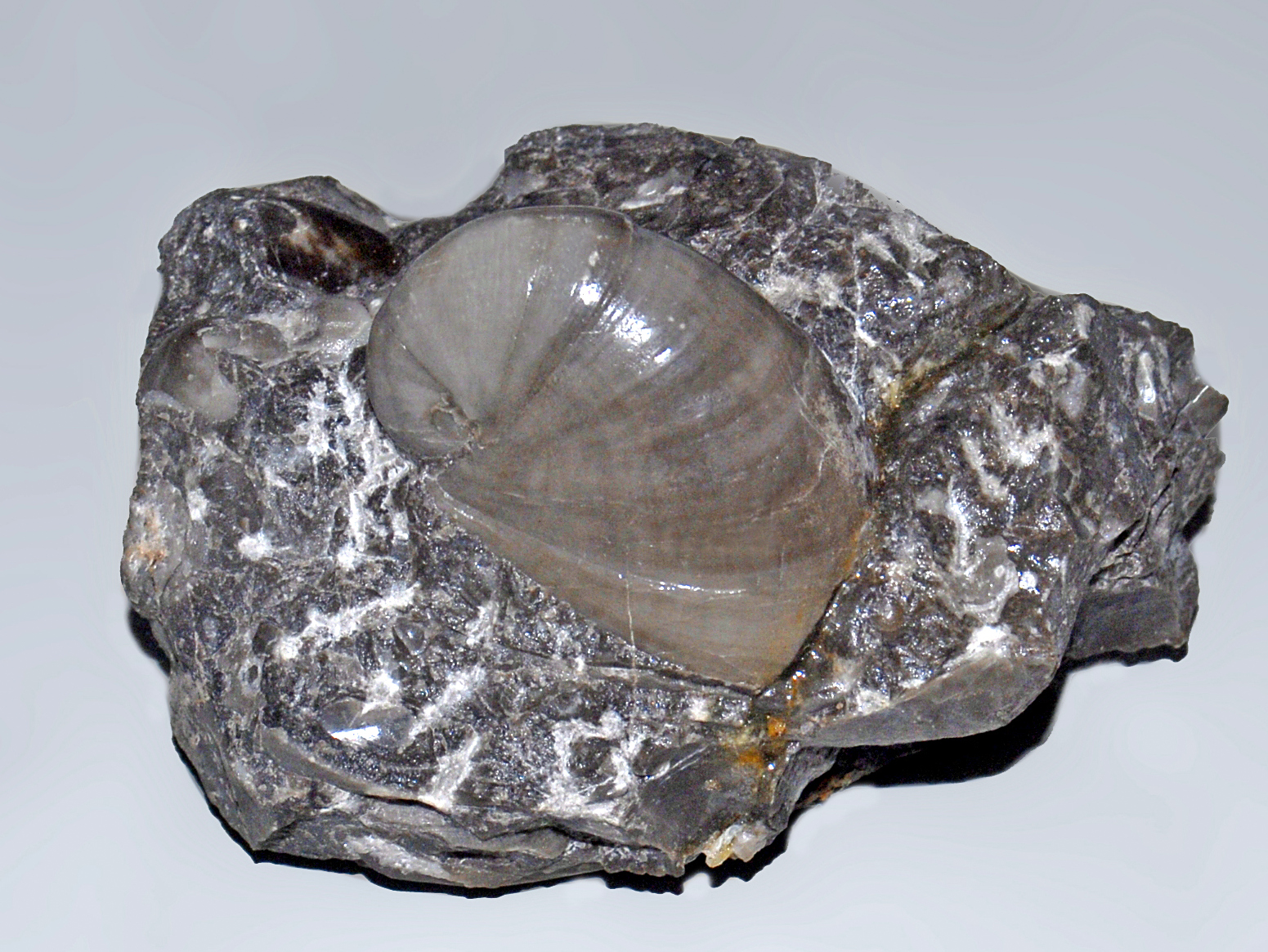
- Fossilized shell of the Early Devonian – Triassic sea snail Naticopsis
  †Naticopsis
  - †Naticopsis aequistriata – type locality for species
  - †Naticopsis comperta
  - †Naticopsis genevievensis
  - †Naticopsis levis
  - †Naticopsis ziczac – type locality for species
- †Navifusa
  - †Navifusa drosera
- †Neilsonia
  - †Neilsonia uninodocarinata
- †Neochonetes
  - †Neochonetes granulifer
  - †Neochonetes variolata
- †Neospirifer
  - †Neospirifer cameratus
  - †Neospirifer dunbari
- †Nephriticeras – tentative report
- †Nereidavus
  - †Nereidavus varians
- †Neumatoceras
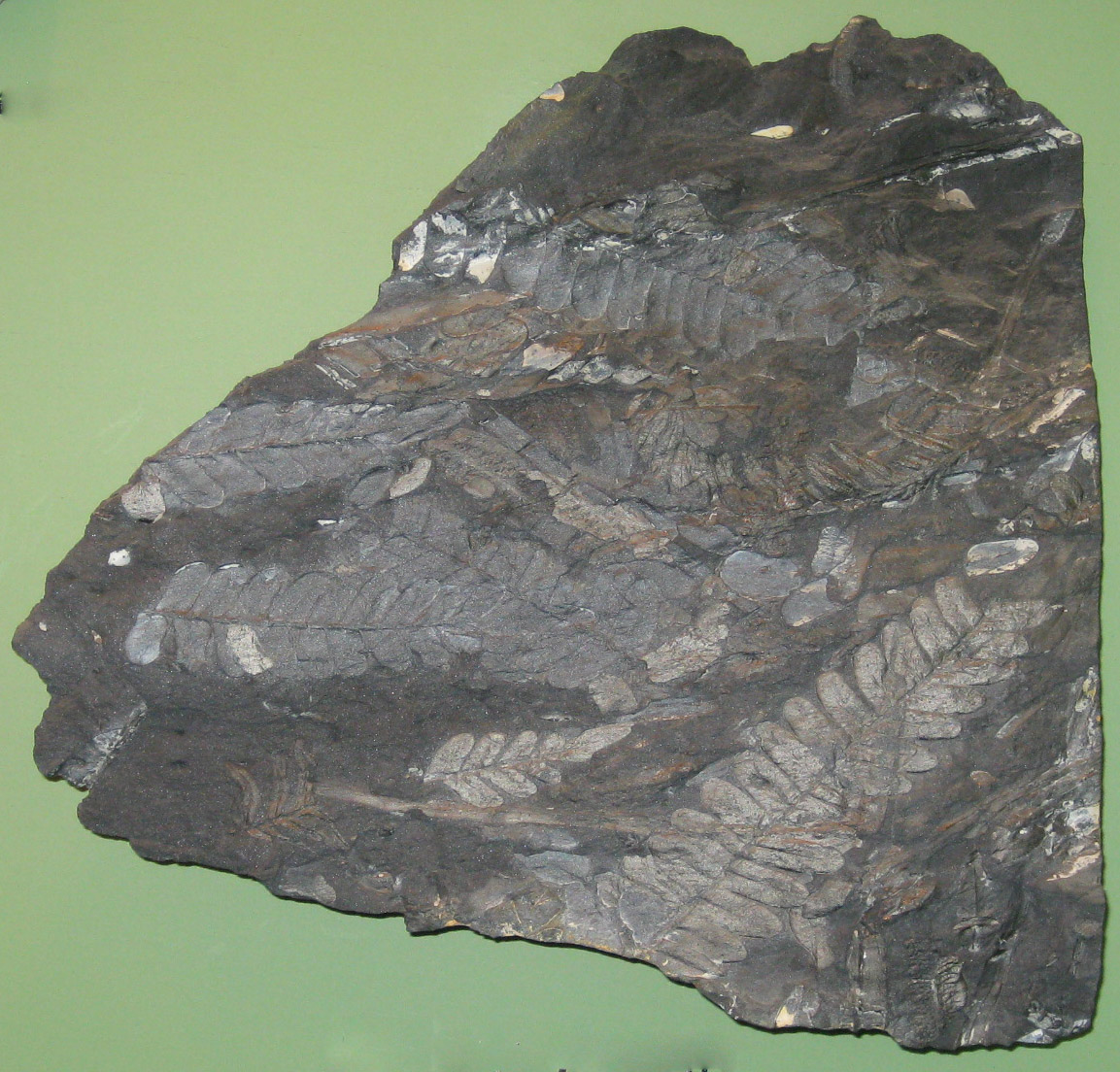
- Fronds of the Carboniferous seed fern Neuropteris
  †Neuropteris
  - †Neuropteris heterophylla
  - †Neuropteris ovata
  - †Neuropteris scheuchzeri
- †Nicholsonella
  - †Nicholsonella peculiaris
- †Nicollidina
  - †Nicollidina remscheidensis
- †Nodonema
  - †Nodonema granulatum
- †Nucleocrinus
  - †Nucleocrinus elegans – or unidentified comparable form
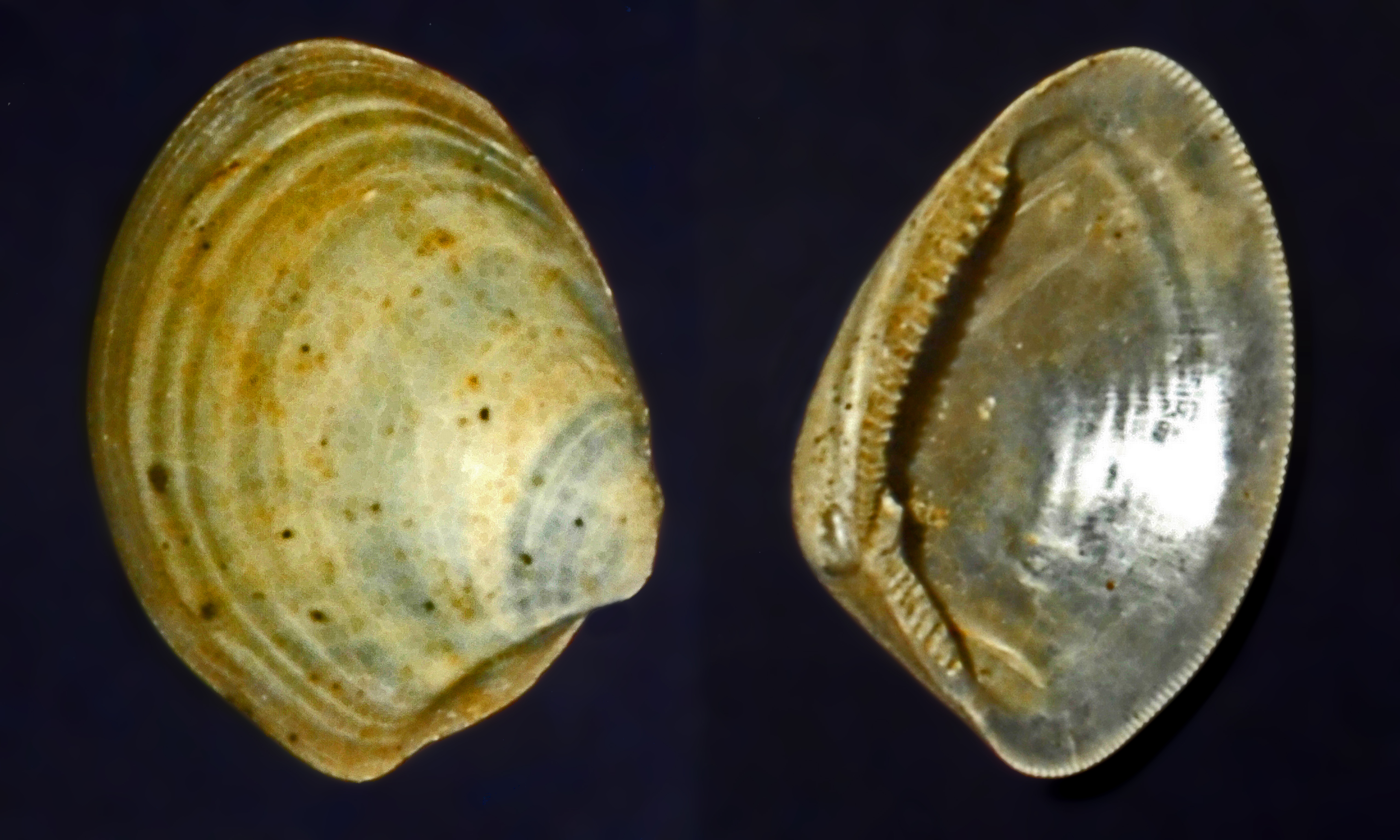
- Interior of a fossilized shell of the Early Ordovician-modern marine bivalve Nucula
  Nucula
  - †Nucula corbuliformis
- Nuculana
- †Nucularca
  - †Nucularca cingulata
- †Nuculites
  - †Nuculites faberi
  - †Nuculites fabula
  - †Nuculites oblongatus
  - †Nuculites triqueter
- †Nuculopsis
  - †Nuculopsis beyrichi
  - †Nuculopsis elongata
  - †Nuculopsis girtyi
  - †Nuculopsis shumardana – or unidentified related form
- † Nyassa
  - †Nyassa recta

== O ==
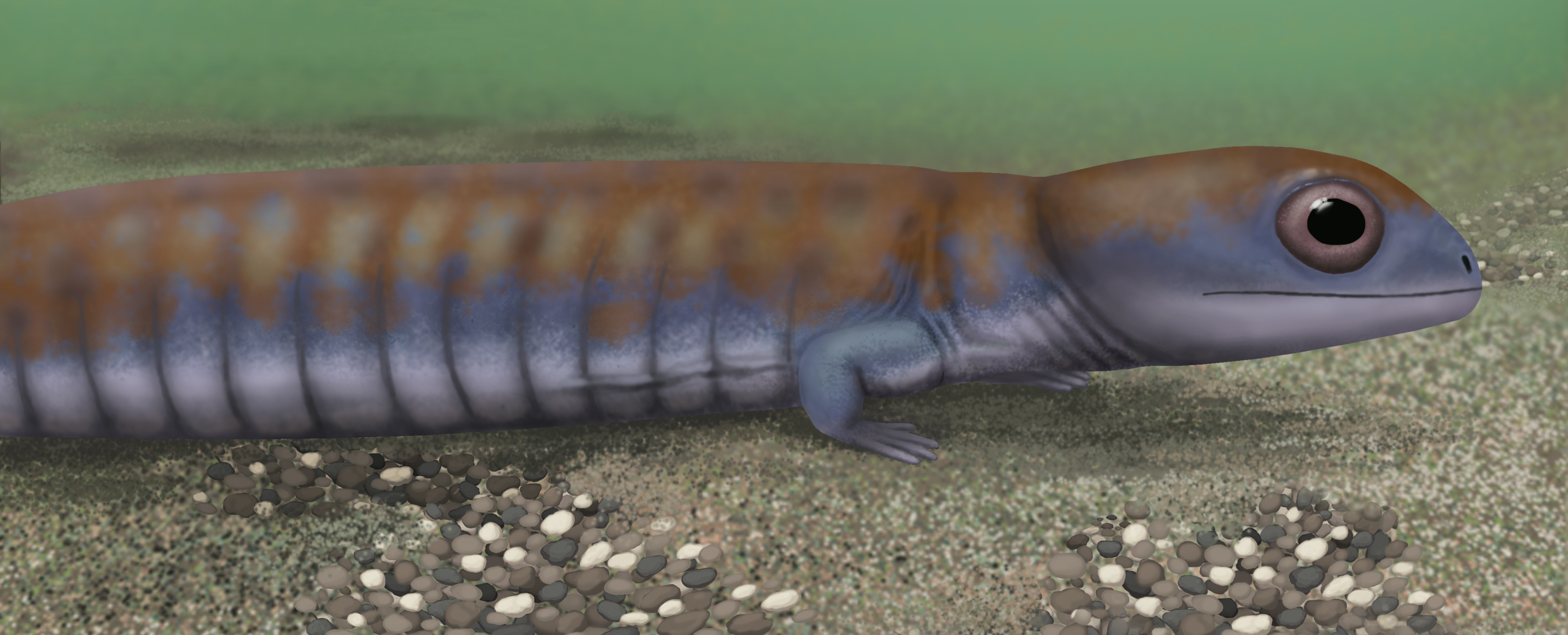
- Life restoration of the Carboniferous amphibian Odonterpeton
  †Odonterpeton – type locality for genus
  - †Odonterpeton triangulare – type locality for species
- †Odontopleura
- †Odontopteris
  - †Odontopteris aequalis
  - †Odontopteris brardii
- †Oehlertella
  - †Oehlertella stoutella
- †Oestocephalus – type locality for genus
  - †Oestocephalus amphiuminum – type locality for species
- †Ohiocrinus
  - †Ohiocrinus laxus
  - †Ohiocrinus oehanus
- †Olenoides
- †Onchus
- †Oncoceras
- †Onniella
- †Onychochilus
  - †Onychochilus abruptum – type locality for species
- †Oomoceras
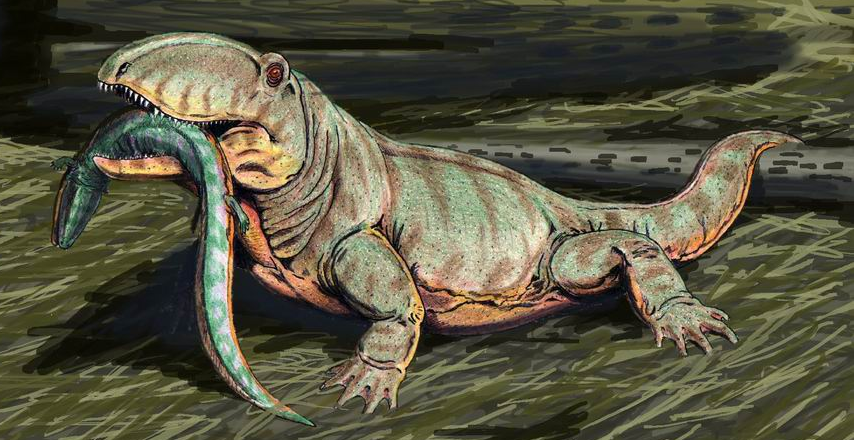
- Life restoration of the Carboniferous-Permian synapsid (mammal precursor) Ophiacodon
  †Ophiacodon
  - †Ophiacodon uniformis – or unidentified comparable form
- †Opisthoptera
- †Opsiocrinus
  - †Opsiocrinus mariae
- †Orbiculoidea
  - †Orbiculoidea capuliformis
  - †Orbiculoidea herzeri
  - †Orbiculoidea missouriensis
  - †Orbiculoidea newberryi
- †Orthis – tentative report
- †Orthoceras
  - †Orthoceras trusitum
  - †Orthoceras type locality for species – informal
- †Orthodesma
  - †Orthodesma canaliculatum
- †Orthonema
  - †Orthonema salteri
  - †Orthonema subtaeniatum
- †Orthonota
  - †Orthonota undulata
- †Orthonybyoceras – tentative report
- †Orthonychia
  - †Orthonychia chesterense – tentative report
  - †Orthonychia herzeri
  - †Orthonychia infabricatus – type locality for species
  - †Orthonychia parva
  - †Orthonychia sciotoensis – type locality for species
  - †Orthonychia waverlyensis
- †Orthopleura
- †Orthorhynchula
  - †Orthorhynchula linneyi
- †Ortonella
- †Oulodus
  - †Oulodus equirectis
  - †Oulodus equirectus
- †Oxyprora
  - †Oxyprora missouriensis
- †Ozarkodina
  - †Ozarkodina bohemica
  - †Ozarkodina confluens
  - †Ozarkodina remscheidenesis
  - †Ozarkodina sagitta
  - †Ozarkodina tillmani

== P ==
- †Pachydictya
  - †Pachydictya bifurcata
- †Paiderocrinus
  - †Paiderocrinus asketos
  - †Paiderocrinus ochthos
- †Palacanthus
  - †Palacanthus acutus
- †Palaeocapulus
  - †Palaeocapulus equilateralis
  - †Palaeocapulus morsei – type locality for species
- †Palaeoconcha
- †Palaeolima
  - †Palaeolima retifera
  - †Palaeolima triplistriata
- †Palaeoneilo
  - †Palaeoneilo bedfordensis
  - †Palaeoneilo bownockeri
  - †Palaeoneilo constricta – or unidentified related form
  - †Palaeoneilo oweni
- †Palaeonucula
  - †Palaeonucula lunulata – type locality for species
  - †Palaeonucula subrotundata
- †Palaeopalaemon
  - †Palaeopalaemon elegans – type locality for species
- †Palaeophycus
- †Palaeoporites
- †Palaeoscenidium
  - †Palaeoscenidium cladophorum
  - †Palaeoscenidium quadriramosum
- †Palaeostachya
  - †Palaeostachya aperta
  - †Palaeostachya decacnema
  - †Palaeostachya elongata
  - †Palaeostachya ovalis
  - †Palaeostachya trabeculata – type locality for species
- †Palaeostylus
  - †Palaeostylus marvinwelleri
  - †Palaeostylus minuta
  - †Palaeostylus venustus
- †Palaeotrochus
  - †Palaeotrochus kearnyi
- †Palaeozygopleura
  - †Palaeozygopleura hamiltoniae
  - †Palaeozygopleura joani
  - †Palaeozygopleura laeviusculum
  - †Palaeozygopleura parvula
  - †Palaeozygopleura sibleyensis
- †Paleofavosites
  - †Paleofavosites prolificus
- †paleoporites
- †Paleschara
- †Paliphyllum
  - †Paliphyllum brassfieldense
  - †Paliphyllum primarium
  - †Paliphyllum regulare
- †Panderodus
  - †Panderodus unicostatus
- †Paracyclas
  - †Paracyclas lirata
  - †Paracyclas proavia
- †Paracyrtolites
  - †Paracyrtolites carinatus
- †Paragoniozona
  - †Paragoniozona granulostriata – or unidentified comparable form
- †Parajuresania
  - †Parajuresania nebrascensis
- †Paraliospira
  - †Paraliospira rugata
- †Parallelocrinus
  - †Parallelocrinus sturgeoni – type locality for species
- †Parallelodon
  - †Parallelodon irvinensis
  - †Parallelodon obsoletus
  - †Parallelodon tenuistriatus
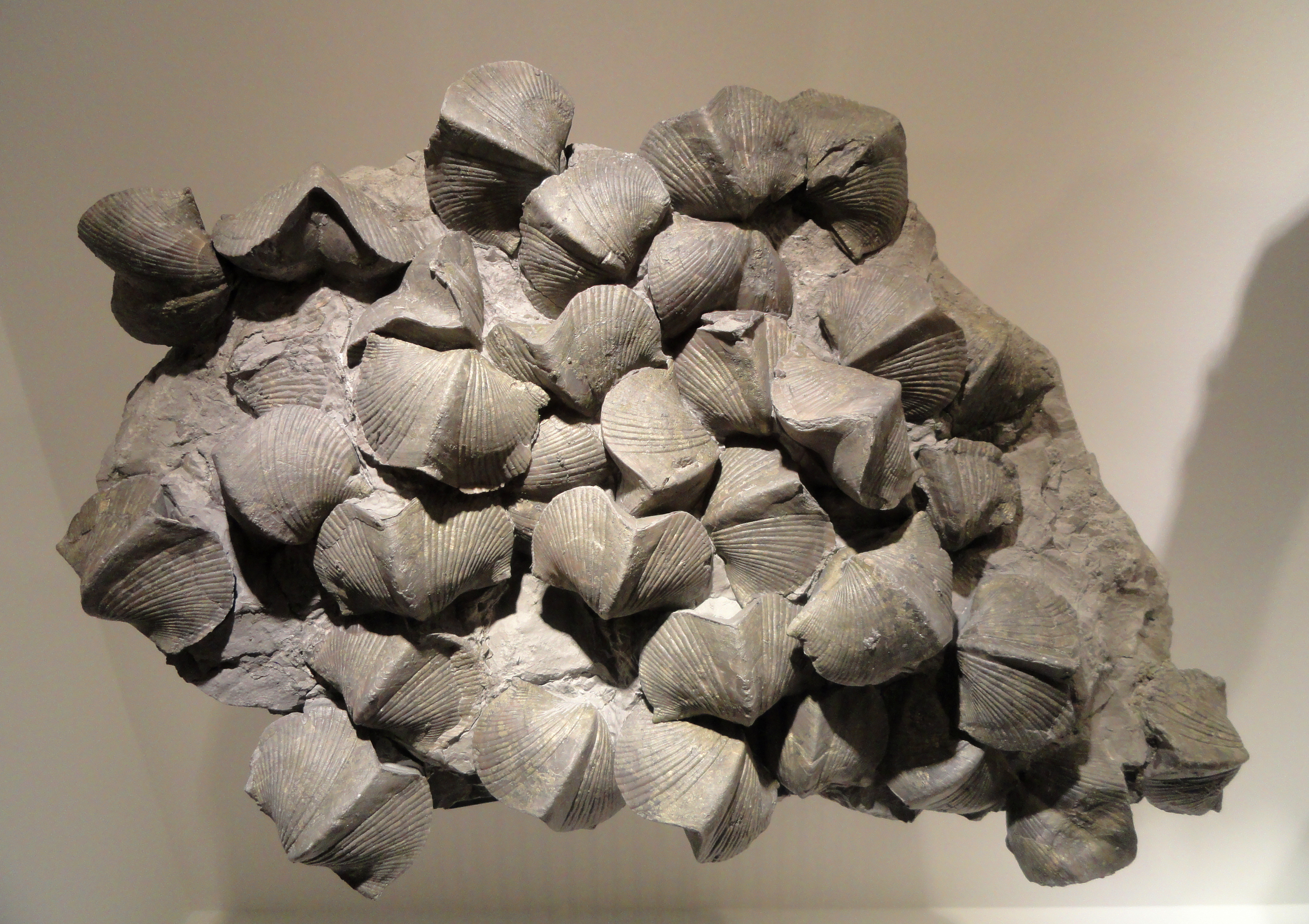
- Assemblage of the Early-Middle Devonian brachiopod Paraspirifer
  †Paraspirifer
  - †Paraspirifer bownockeri
- †Parazyga
- †Parvohallopora
  - †Parvohallopora onealli
  - †Parvohallopora ramosa
- †Pasceolus
  - †Pasceolus camdenensis
- †Patellilabia
- †Patelliocrinus – type locality for genus
  - †Patelliocrinus planus – type locality for species
- †Pattersonia
- †Paupospira
  - †Paupospira bowdeni
  - †Paupospira trilineata – type locality for species
  - †Paupospira tropidophora
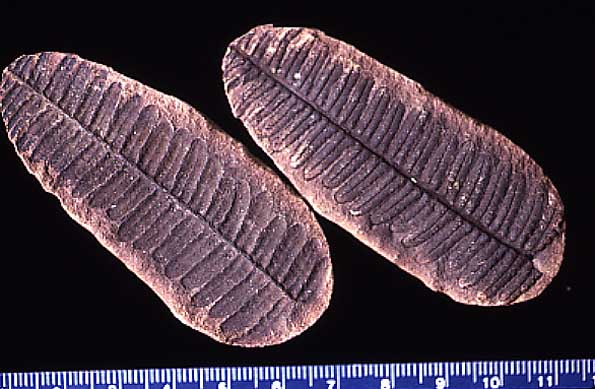
- Fossils of the Late Devonian-Permian fern-like fronds Pecopteris
  †Pecopteris
  - †Pecopteris arborescens
  - †Pecopteris candolleana
  - †Pecopteris cyathea
  - †Pecopteris hemitelioides
  - †Pecopteris lamuriana
  - †Pecopteris miltonii
  - †Pecopteris unita
- †Penniretepora
  - †Penniretepora irregularis – or unidentified comparable form
- †Pennoceras
  - †Pennoceras seamani
- †Pentamerus
- †Permophorus
  - †Permophorus oblongus
  - †Permophorus subcostatus
  - †Permophorus tropidophorus
- †Pernopecten
  - †Pernopecten ohioensis
  - †Pernopecten prosseri
- †Peronopora
  - †Peronopora decipiens
- †Petalodus
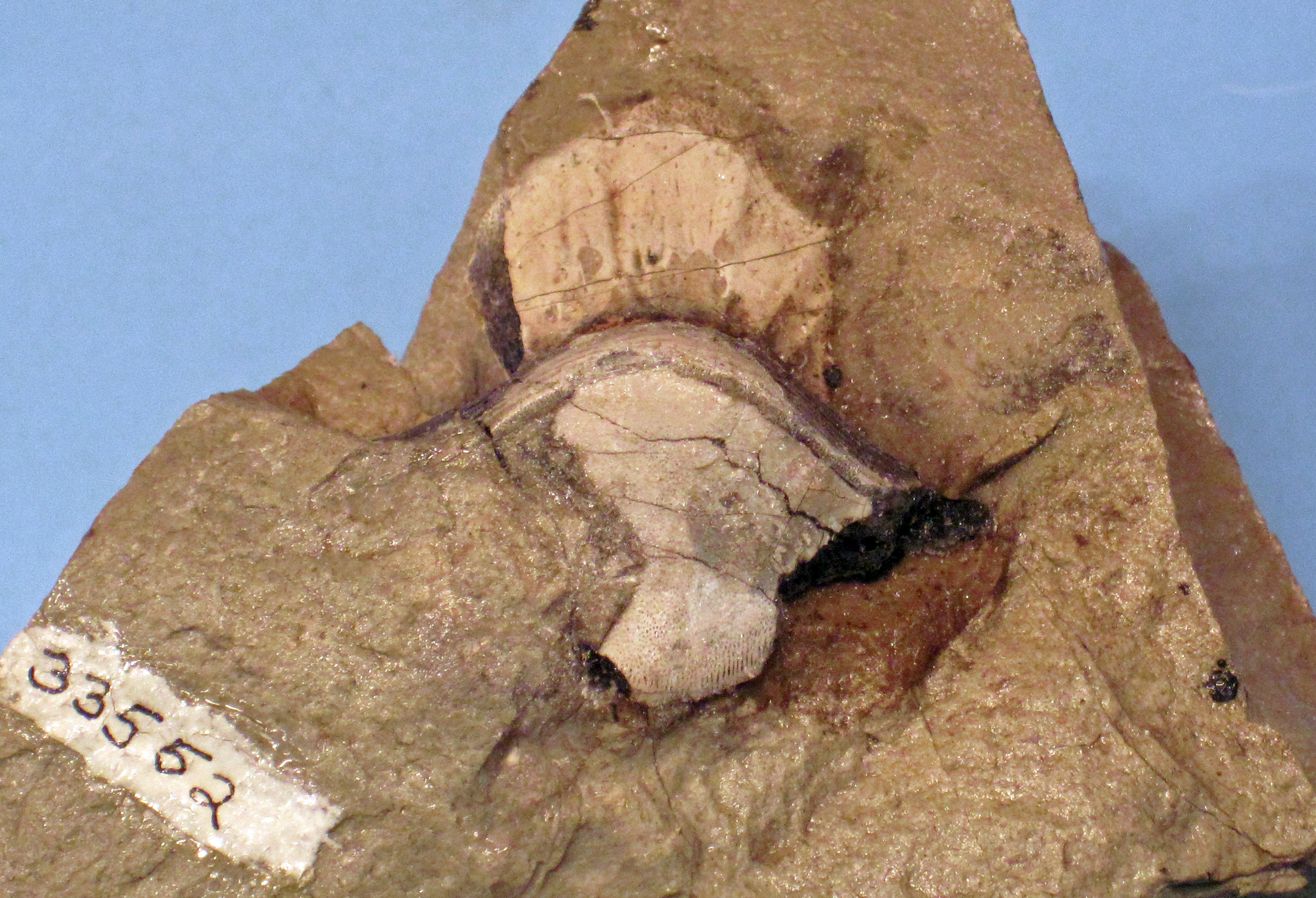
  - Fossilized tooth found in Athens County of the Carboniferous-Permiand shark Petalodus
    †Petalodus ohioensis
- †Petigopora
  - †Petigopora offfula
- †Petraster
- †Petrocrania
  - †Petrocrania hamiltonensis
  - †Petrocrania laelia
  - †Petrocrania modesta
  - †Petrocrania scabiosa
- †Petrozium
  - †Petrozium pelagicum
- †Pharkidonotus
  - †Pharkidonotus breyeri – type locality for species
  - †Pharkidonotus labioreflexus – type locality for species
  - †Pharkidonotus percarinatus
- †Phestia
  - †Phestia inflata
  - †Phestia pandoraeformis
- †Philhedra
  - †Philhedra crenistriatula
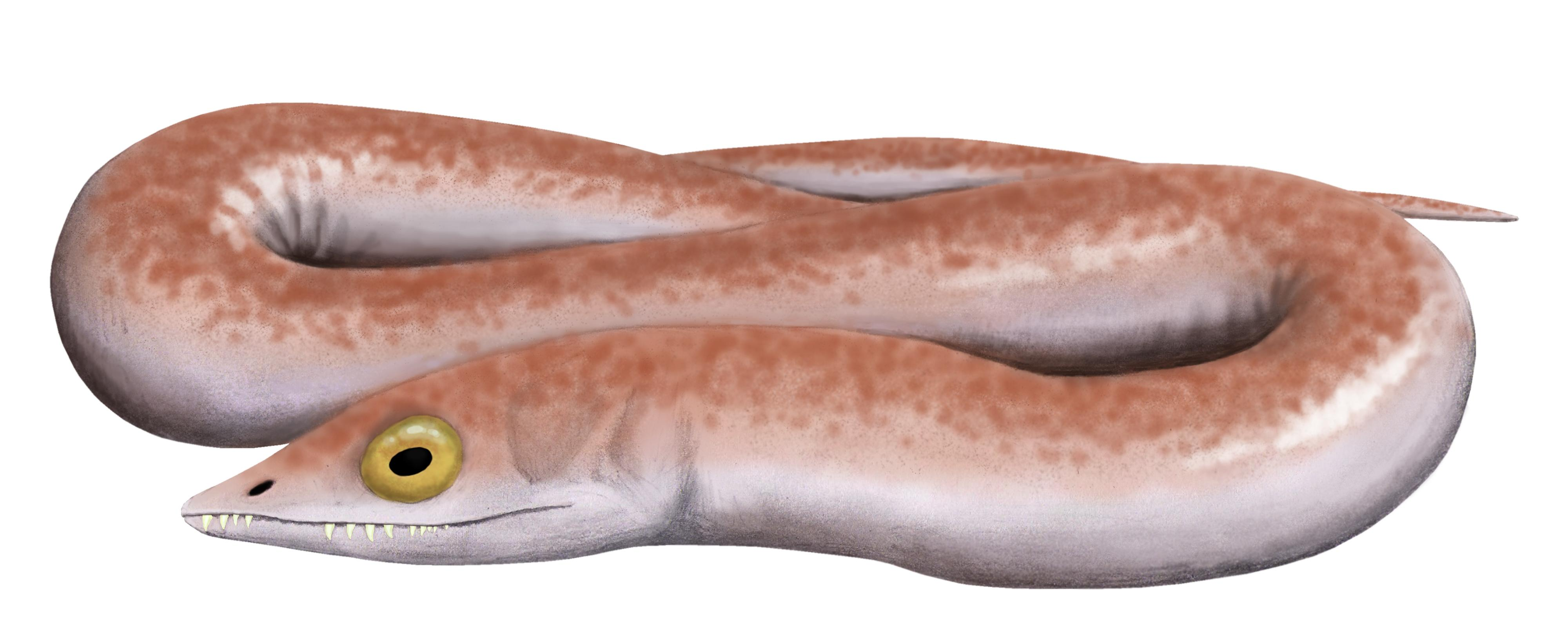
- Life restoration of the Carboniferous-Permian amphibian Phlegethontia.
  †Phlegethontia – type locality for genus
  - †Phlegethontia linearis – type locality for species
  - †Phlegethontia longissima – type locality for species
- †Pholadella
  - †Pholadella radiata
- †Pholadomorpha
  - †Pholadomorpha pholadiformis
- †Pholidops
- †Pholidostrophia
  - †Pholidostrophia geniculata
  - †Pholidostrophia gracilis
  - †Pholidostrophia nacrea
- †Phragmoceras
- †Phragmolites
  - †Phragmolites elegans – type locality for species
- †Phragmosphaera
  - †Phragmosphaera lyra
- †Phylloporina
- †Phyloblatta
  - †Phyloblatta jeffersoniana – type locality for species
- †Phymatopleura
  - †Phymatopleura brazoensis
  - †Phymatopleura nodosa
- †Phyrgilocrinus
  - †Phyrgilocrinus batheri
- †Phyrtosaster – type locality for genus
  - †Phyrtosaster casteri – type locality for species
- †Physonemus
  - †Physonemus striatus – or unidentified comparable form
- †Physotomya
- †Pianodesma
- Pinna
  - †Pinna missouriensis
- †Pityosporites
  - †Pityosporites westphalensis
- †Placopterina
  - †Placopterina ohioensis – type locality for species
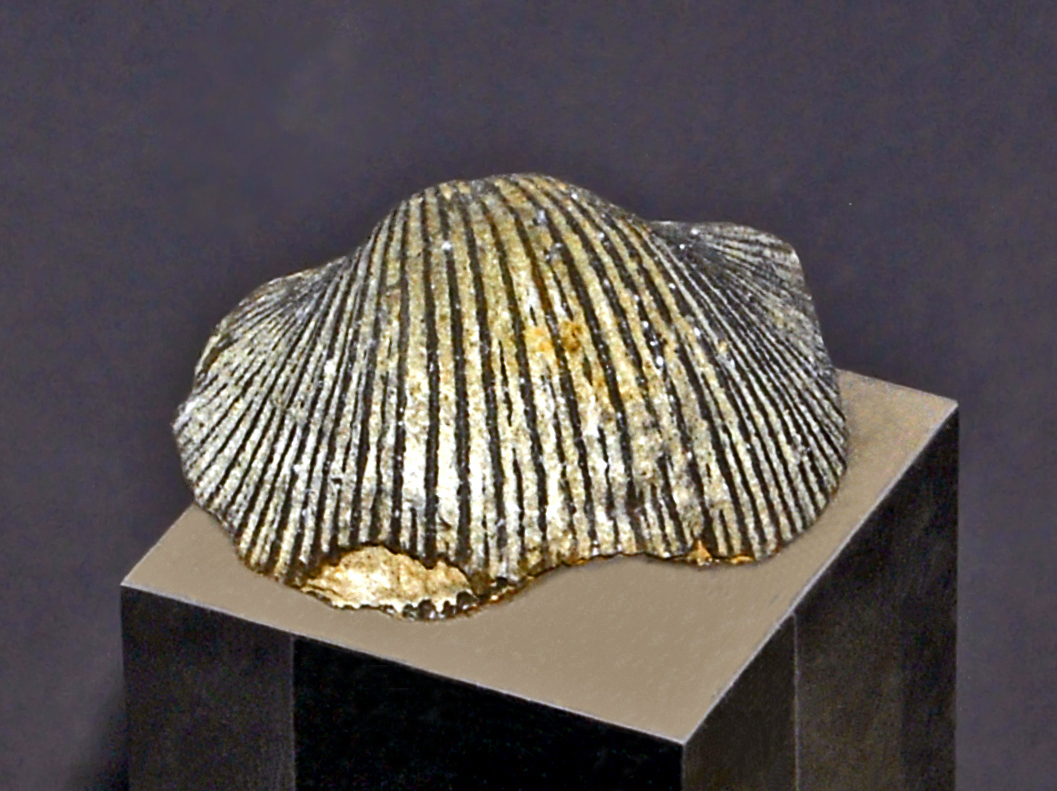
- Fossilized shell of the Ordovician brachiopod Plaesiomys
  †Plaesiomys
  - †Plaesiomys subquadrata
- †Plagiascetus – type locality for genus
  - †Plagiascetus lateralis – type locality for species
- †Plagioglypta
- †Planalveolitella
  - †Planalveolitella parasitica
- †Planisporites
  - †Planisporites granifer
- †Planoendothyra
  - †Planoendothyra associata
  - †Planoendothyra evoluta
  - †Planoendothyra orbiculata
  - †Planoendothyra ovata – or unidentified comparable form
  - †Planoendothyra whitesidei – or unidentified comparable form
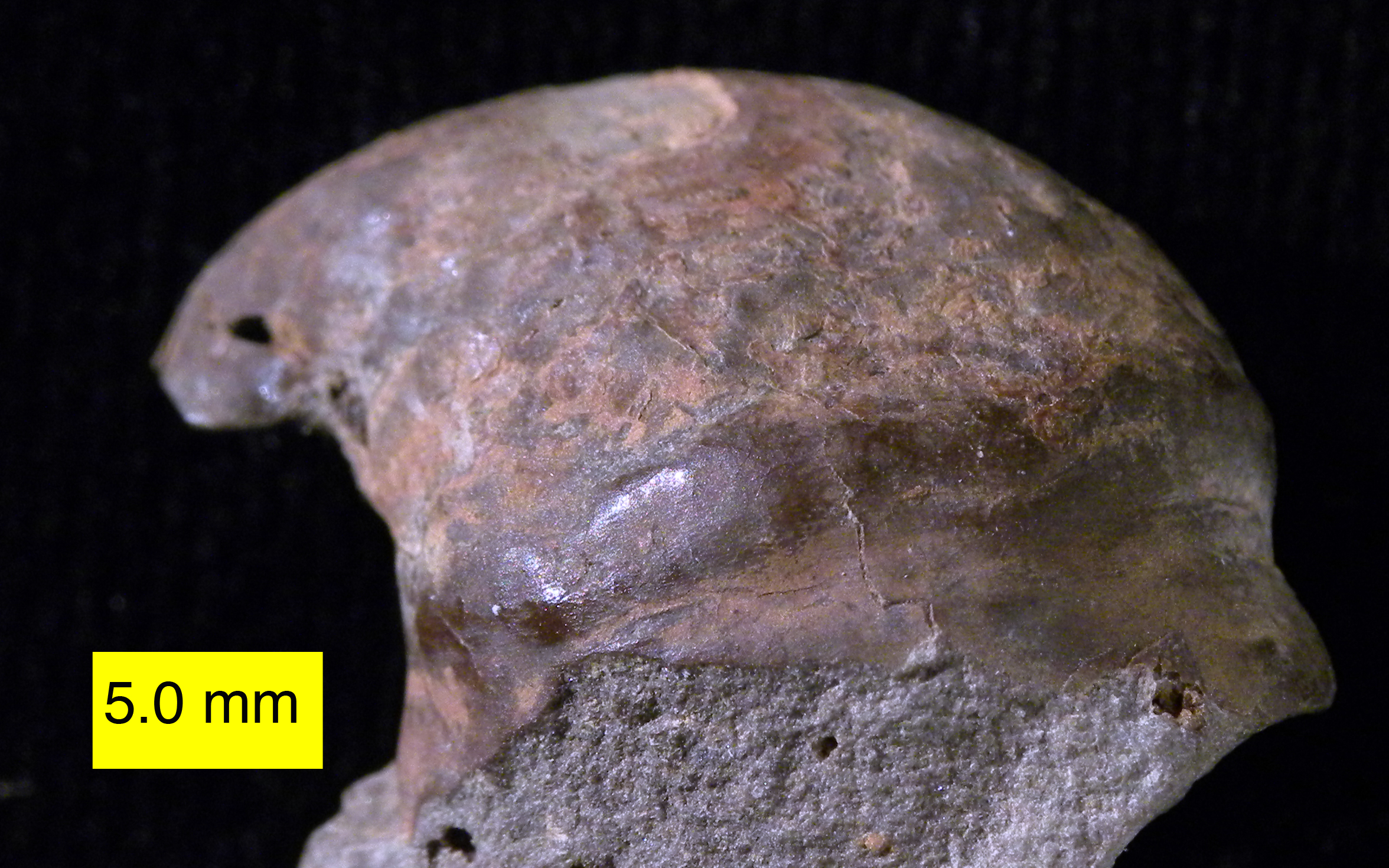
- Fossilized shell found near Wooster of the Silurian-Early Triassic sea snail Platyceras
  †Platyceras
  - †Platyceras attenuatum
  - †Platyceras bucculentum
  - †Platyceras carinatum
  - †Platyceras cymbium
  - †Platyceras erectum
  - †Platyceras lineatum
  - †Platyceras nasutum
  - †Platyceras rarispinum
  - †Platyceras subglobosa – type locality for species
  - †Platyceras thetis
- †Platycoryphe
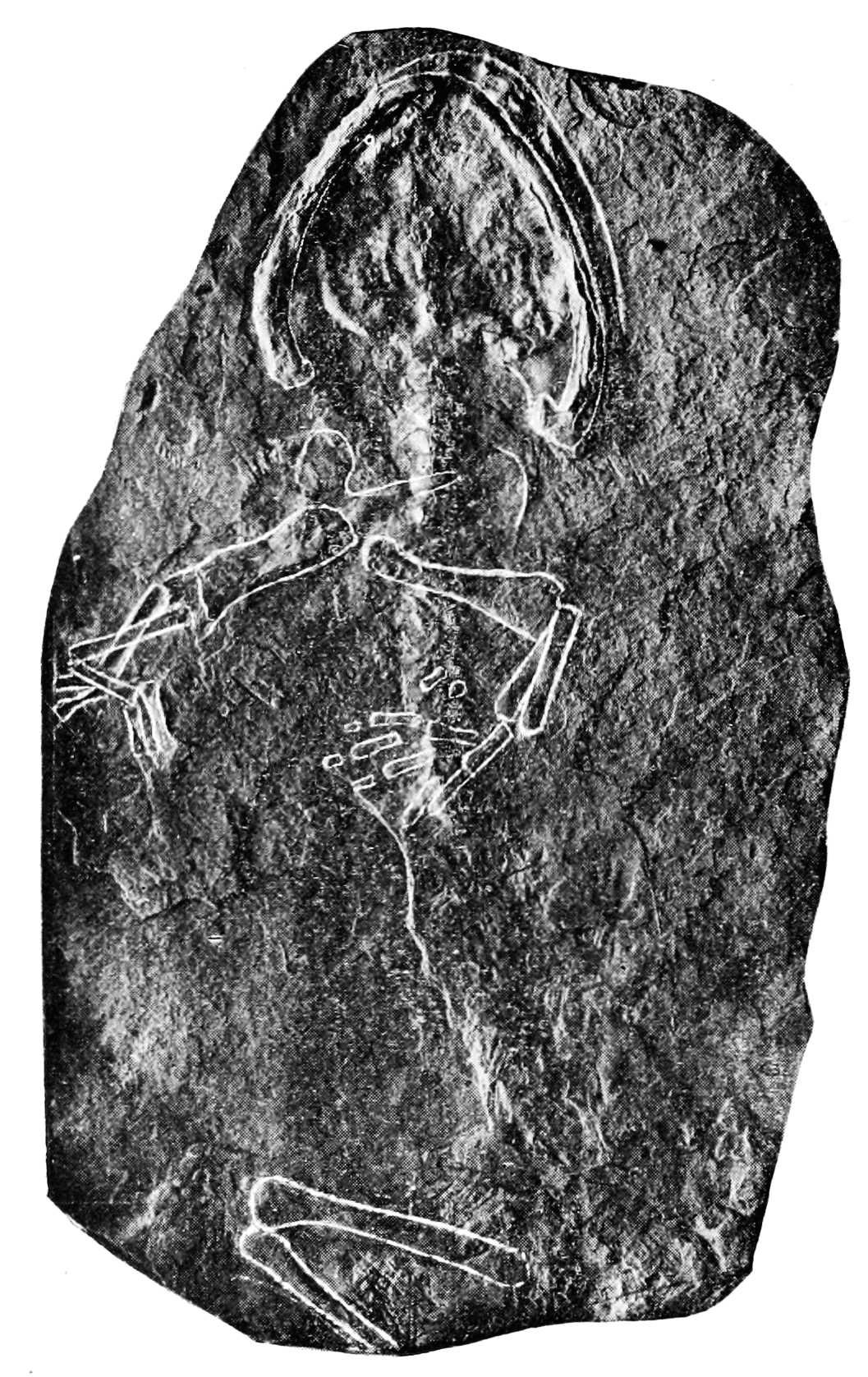
- Fossilized skeleton of the Carboniferous amphibian Platyrhinops
  †Platyrhinops – type locality for genus
  - †Platyrhinops lyelli – type locality for species
- †Platystrophia
  - †Platystrophia actilirata
  - †Platystrophia acutilirata
  - †Platystrophia annieana
  - †Platystrophia auburnensis
  - †Platystrophia clarksvillensis
  - †Platystrophia corryvillensis
  - †Platystrophia crassa
  - †Platystrophia cummingsi
  - †Platystrophia cypha
  - †Platystrophia elkhornensis
  - †Platystrophia foerstei
  - †Platystrophia hopensis
  - †Platystrophia laticosta
  - †Platystrophia moritura
  - †Platystrophia morrowensis
  - †Platystrophia nitida
  - †Platystrophia pauciplicata
  - †Platystrophia ponderosa
  - †Platystrophia sublaticosta
  - †Platystrophia wallowayi
- †Plectodina
- †Plectonotus
  - †Plectonotus boucoti
- †Plectorthis
  - †Plectorthis aequivalvis
  - †Plectorthis fissicosta
  - †Plectorthis jamesi
  - †Plectorthis neglecta
  - †Plectorthis plicatella
- †Plethospira
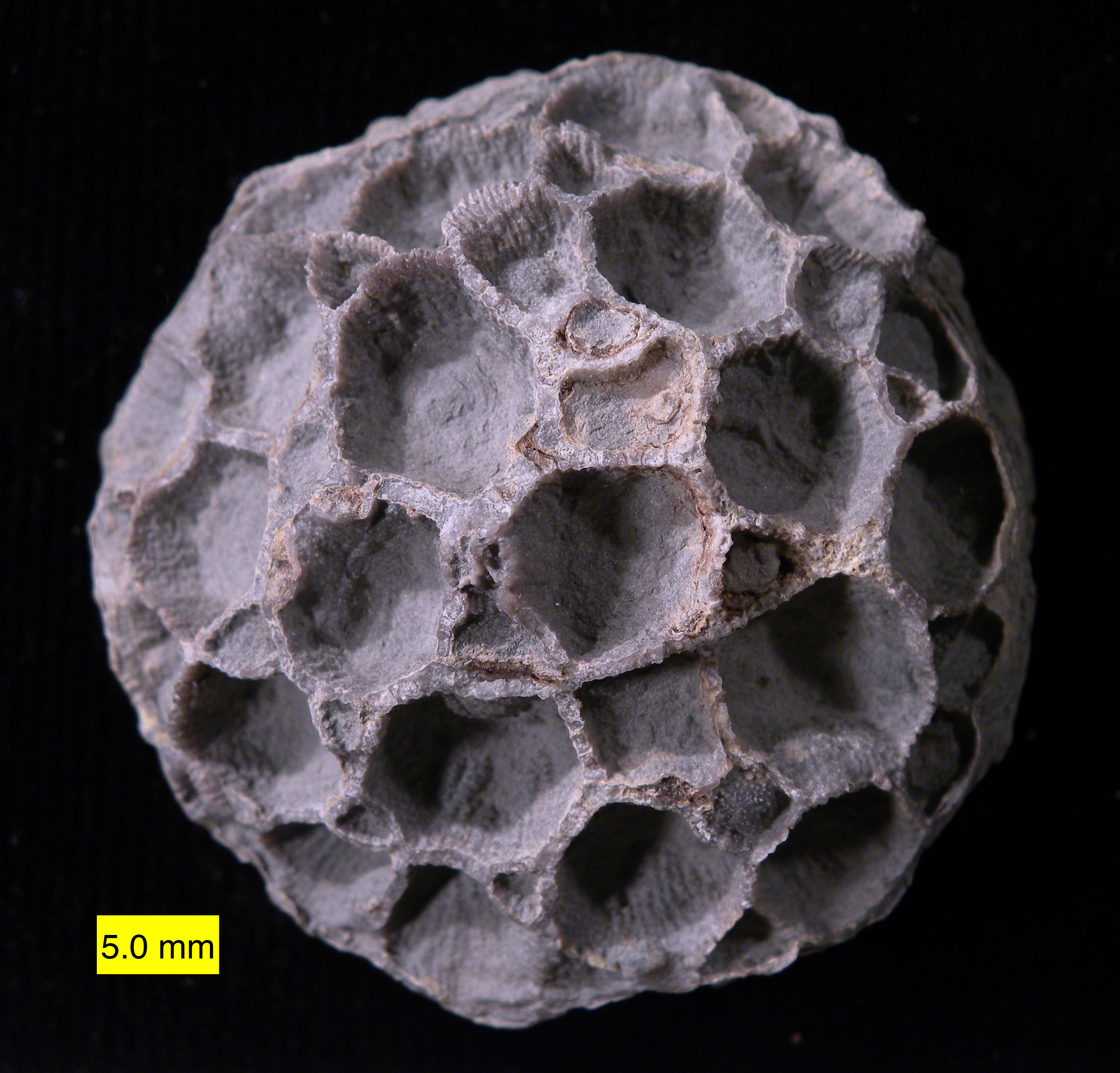
- Fossil of the Silurian-Carboniferous tabulate coral Pleurodictyum
  †Pleurodictyum
  - †Pleurodictyum cornu
  - †Pleurodictyum plana
- †Pleuronotus
  - †Pleuronotus decewi
- †Pleuroptyx – type locality for genus
  - †Pleuroptyx clavatus – type locality for species
- †Pleurorthoceras
  - †Pleurorthoceras clarksvillense
- †Plexadictyon
- †Plocezyga
  - †Plocezyga acuminata
  - †Plocezyga conica
  - †Plocezyga cordiformis
  - †Plocezyga costata – type locality for species
  - †Plocezyga delicata
  - †Plocezyga excellens
  - †Plocezyga intermedia
  - †Plocezyga lineata
  - †Plocezyga lirata
  - †Plocezyga markae
  - †Plocezyga ornata – type locality for species
  - †Plocezyga ornatissima
  - †Plocezyga percostata
  - †Plocezyga perminuta
  - †Plocezyga regularia
  - †Plocezyga subnodosa
  - †Plocezyga turbinata
- †Podolithus
- †Poleumita
  - †Poleumita incarinatus
- †Polidevcia
  - †Polidevcia bellistriata
  - †Polidevcia stevensiana
- †Polyentactinia
  - †Polyentactinia craticulata
  - †Polyentactinia leptosphaera
  - †Polyentactinia plecta
  - †Polyentactinia polygonia
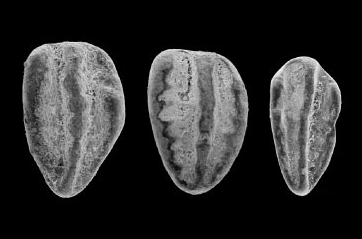
- Various conodont elements of Polygnathus
  †Polygnathus
  - †Polygnathus eiflius
  - †Polygnathus intermedius
  - †Polygnathus linguiformis
  - †Polygnathus pseudofoliatus
  - †Polygnathus strongi
  - †Polygnathus xylus
- †Polypora
  - †Polypora valida – or unidentified comparable form
- Pontocypris
  - †Pontocypris acuminata
- †Poroblattina
  - †Poroblattina brachyptera – type locality for species
  - †Poroblattina lata – type locality for species
  - †Poroblattina ohioensis – type locality for species
  - †Poroblattina richmondiana – type locality for species
  - †Poroblattina rotundata – type locality for species
- †Posidonia
  - †Posidonia girtyi
- †Praenucula
- †Primiriopsis
  - †Primiriopsis punctulifera
- †Primitia
  - †Primitia cincinnatiensis
  - †Primitia rudis
- †Primitiella
  - †Primitiella claypolei
  - †Primitiella whitfieldi
- †Probillingsites
  - †Probillingsites lebanonensis
- Proboscina
  - †Proboscina auloporoides
  - †Proboscina frondosa
- †Proctothylacocrinus
  - †Proctothylacocrinus esseri
  - †Proctothylacocrinus longus
- †Productus
  - †Productus semireticulatua
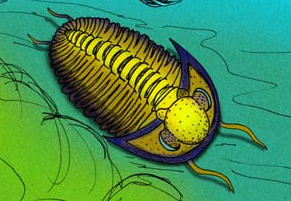
- Restoration of the Silurian trilobite Proetus
  †Proetus
- †Promopalaeaster
  - †Promopalaeaster granulosus
  - †Promopalaeaster wykoffi
- †Promytilus
  - †Promytilus pottsvillensis – type locality for species
- †Propora
  - †Propora conferta
  - †Propora eminula
- †Prosserella
  - †Prosserella lucasi
  - †Prosserella subtransversa
- †Protaraea
  - †Protaraea richmondensis
- †Protarea
- †Protathyris – tentative report
- †Protobalanus
  - †Protobalanus spinicoronatus – type locality for species
- †Protocycloceras
  - †Protocycloceras rushense
- †Protokionoceras
- †Protoleptostrophia
  - †Protoleptostrophia perplana
- †Protosalvinia
  - †Protosalvinia arnoldii
  - †Protosalvinia ravenna
- †Protoscolex
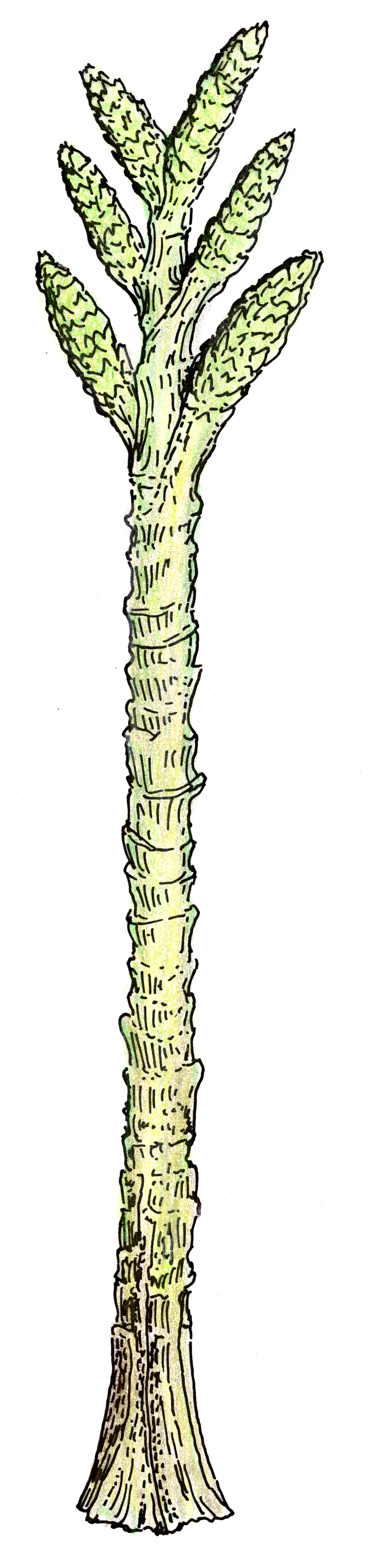
- Restoration based on the "Schunnemunk tree" fossil of the Silurian-Late Devonian tree-like probable fungus Prototaxites
  †Prototaxites
  - †Prototaxites clevelandensis
- †Pseudaviculopecten
  - †Pseudaviculopecten fasciculatus
  - †Pseudaviculopecten scabridus
- †Pseudoactinodictyon
  - †Pseudoactinodictyon stearni
  - †Pseudoactinodictyon vagans
- †Pseudoatrypa
  - †Pseudoatrypa devoniana
- †Pseudobigalea
  - †Pseudobigalea crista
- †Pseudocolpomya
  - †Pseudocolpomya miseneri
- †Pseudolingula
- †Pseudomonotis
  - †Pseudomonotis equistriata
  - †Pseudomonotis hawni
  - †Pseudomonotis millhorni – type locality for species
- †Pseudomulceodens
  - †Pseudomulceodens cancellatus
- †Pseudooneotodus
  - †Pseudooneotodus bicornis
- †Pseudophorus
  - †Pseudophorus antiquus
- †Pseudorthoceras
  - †Pseudorthoceras knoxense
- †Pseudozygopleura
  - †Pseudozygopleura acuminata
  - †Pseudozygopleura angustata
  - †Pseudozygopleura assertonsoris
  - †Pseudozygopleura baltea – type locality for species
  - †Pseudozygopleura cirritus
  - †Pseudozygopleura contractus
  - †Pseudozygopleura deloi
  - †Pseudozygopleura eximia
  - †Pseudozygopleura funis
  - †Pseudozygopleura girtyi
  - †Pseudozygopleura gradatus
  - †Pseudozygopleura irrugata
  - †Pseudozygopleura kellettae – or unidentified comparable form
  - †Pseudozygopleura lanceolatus
  - †Pseudozygopleura limus
  - †Pseudozygopleura macra – or unidentified comparable form
  - †Pseudozygopleura mucronatus
  - †Pseudozygopleura multicostata – or unidentified comparable form
  - †Pseudozygopleura pagoda – or unidentified comparable form
  - †Pseudozygopleura palus – type locality for species
  - †Pseudozygopleura pandus
  - †Pseudozygopleura peoriense
  - †Pseudozygopleura pinquicula
  - †Pseudozygopleura plummeri – type locality for species
  - †Pseudozygopleura pluricostata
  - †Pseudozygopleura pugonis
  - †Pseudozygopleura pulchra
  - †Pseudozygopleura rectus
  - †Pseudozygopleura schucherti – or unidentified comparable form
  - †Pseudozygopleura scitula
  - †Pseudozygopleura scruposus
  - †Pseudozygopleura semicostata
  - †Pseudozygopleura sinuosior
  - †Pseudozygopleura subulatus
  - †Pseudozygopleura tenuivirga
  - †Pseudozygopleura variegata
- †Psiloconcha
  - †Psiloconcha grandis
  - †Psiloconcha inornata
  - †Psiloconcha sinuata
- †Pterinea
  - †Pterinea corrugatus
  - †Pterinea demissa
- †Pterinopecten
  - †Pterinopecten undosus
- †Pterochiton
  - †Pterochiton carbonarius
  - †Pterochiton spatulatus
- †Pterospermella
  - †Pterospermella capitana
  - †Pterospermella latibalteus
  - †Pterospermella radiata
  - †Pterospermella solis
- †Pterotheca
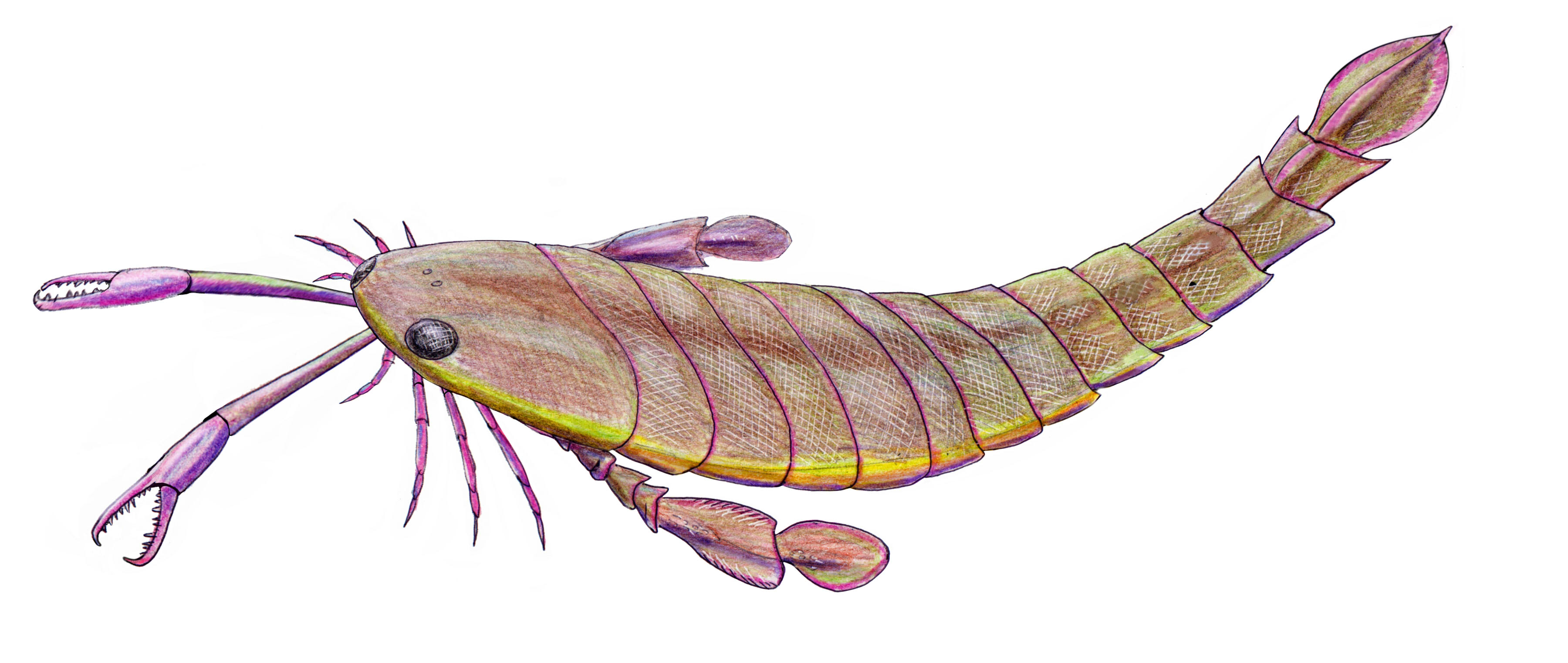
- Life restoration of the Silurian-Middle Devonian eurypterid ("sea scorpion") Pterygotus
  †Pterygotus
  - †Pterygotus carmani
- †Ptilodictya
- †Ptomatis
  - †Ptomatis proteiforme
- †Ptotosalvinia
  - †Ptotosalvinia furcata
- †Ptychocarpus
- †Ptychocrinus
- †Ptychomphalina
  - †Ptychomphalina lucina
  - †Ptychomphalina regulata
- †Ptychopteria
  - †Ptychopteria flabellum
- †Ptychospirina
  - †Ptychospirina varians
- †Ptyonius
  - †Ptyonius marshii – type locality for species
- †Pugnax
  - †Pugnax utah
- †Punctatisporites
  - †Punctatisporites aerarius
  - †Punctatisporites glaber
  - †Punctatisporites minutus
  - †Punctatisporites obesus
- †Punctatisporties
  - †Punctatisporties minutus
- †Punctatosporites
  - †Punctatosporites granifer
  - †Punctatosporites minutus
  - †Punctatosporites rotundus
- †Punctospirifer
  - †Punctospirifer kentuckensis
- †Pustula
  - †Pustula pertenuis
- †Pustulisphaeridium
  - †Pustulisphaeridium levibrachium
- †Pyanomya
- †Pycnocrinus
- †Pyrenomeous

== Q ==
- †Quadrijugator

== R ==
- †Rafinesquina
  - †Rafinesquina alternata
  - †Rafinesquina loxorhytis
  - †Rafinesquina ponderosa
  - †Rafinesquina squamula
- †Raistrickia
  - †Raistrickia crinita
  - †Raistrickia srinita
- †Ramphoprion
- †Raphistoma
- †Rasmussenoceras
- †Reinschospora
  - †Reinschospora magnifica
- †Renalcis
- †Reptaria
  - †Reptaria stolonifera
- †Reteocrinus
- †Reteporina
  - †Reteporina striata
- †Retichonetes
- †Reticulatisporites
  - †Reticulatisporites muricatus
- †Retispira
  - †Retispira fascireticulatus – type locality for species
  - †Retispira tenuilineata
  - †Retispira waverliensis
- †Retrorsirostra
  - †Retrorsirostra carleyi
- †Rhachicrinus
  - †Rhachicrinus wrighti
- †Rhachiopteris
- †Rhapanocrinus
- †Rhegmaphyllum
  - †Rhegmaphyllum daytonensis
- †Rhinidictya
- †Rhinocaris
  - †Rhinocaris ehlersi
- †Rhipidomella
  - †Rhipidomella pecosi
  - †Rhipidomella penelope – or unidentified comparable form
  - †Rhipidomella trigona
  - †Rhipidomella vanuxemi
- †Rhipidothyris
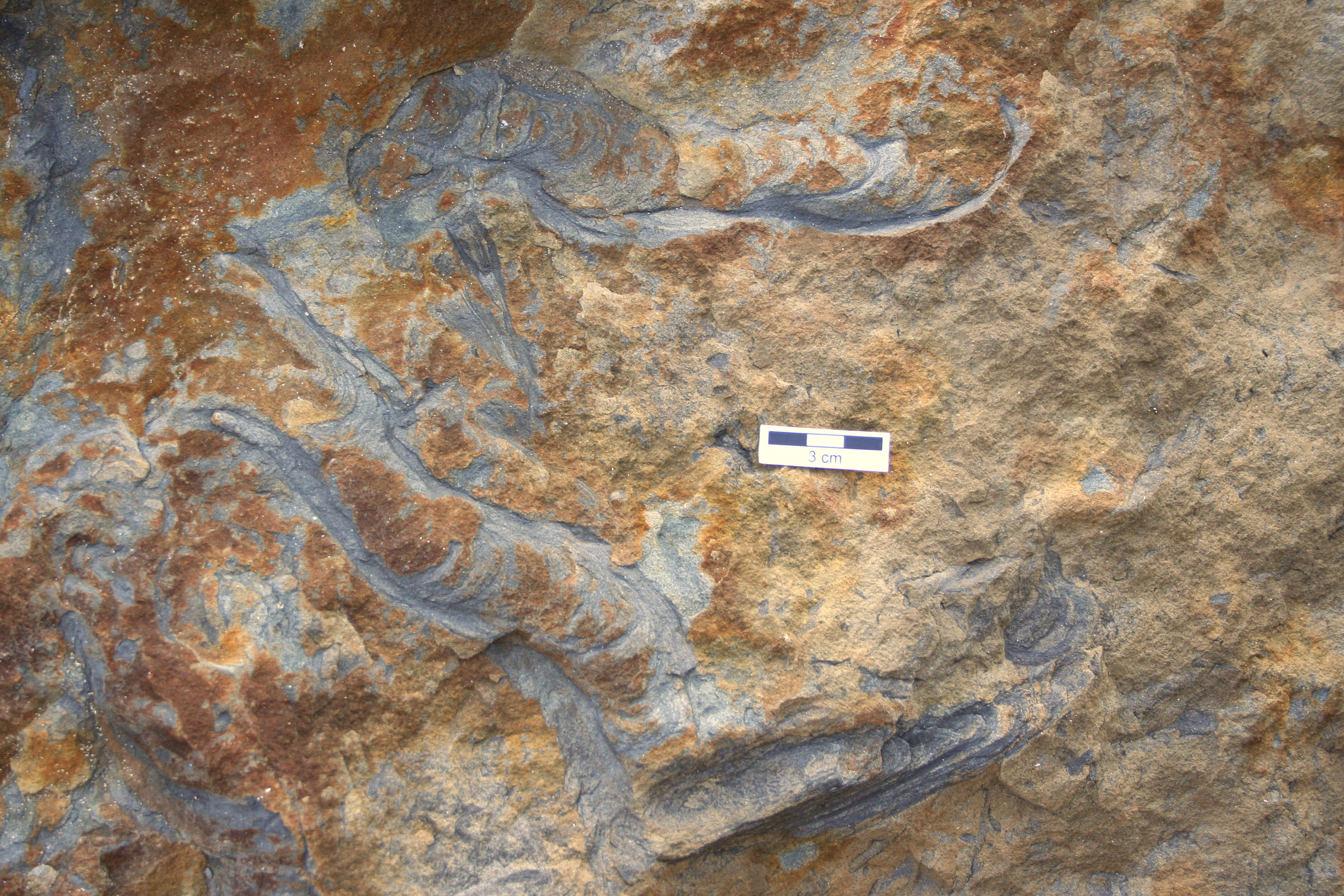
- Fossil of the burrow ichnogenus Rhizocorallium
  †Rhizocorallium
- †Rhombodictyon
- †Rhombopora
  - †Rhombopora lepidodendroides
- †Rhombotrypa
  - †Rhombotrypa subquadrata
- †Rhopolonaria
  - †Rhopolonaria venosa
- †Rhynchopora
- †Rhynchotrema
  - †Rhynchotrema denatum
  - †Rhynchotrema dentatum
- †Rhynchotreta
- †Rhytimya
  - †Rhytimya compressa
  - †Rhytimya faberi
  - †Rhytimya lunulata
  - †Rhytimya oehana
  - †Rhytimya radiata
- †Richmondoceras
  - †Richmondoceras brevicameratum
- †Rizoceras
- †Ropalonaria
- †Royalella
  - †Royalella quadrolirata – type locality for species
  - †Royalella swallowiana – type locality for species
- †Ruedemannia
  - †Ruedemannia trilix – type locality for species
- †Rugomena
  - †Rugomena vetusta
- †Rugosochonetes
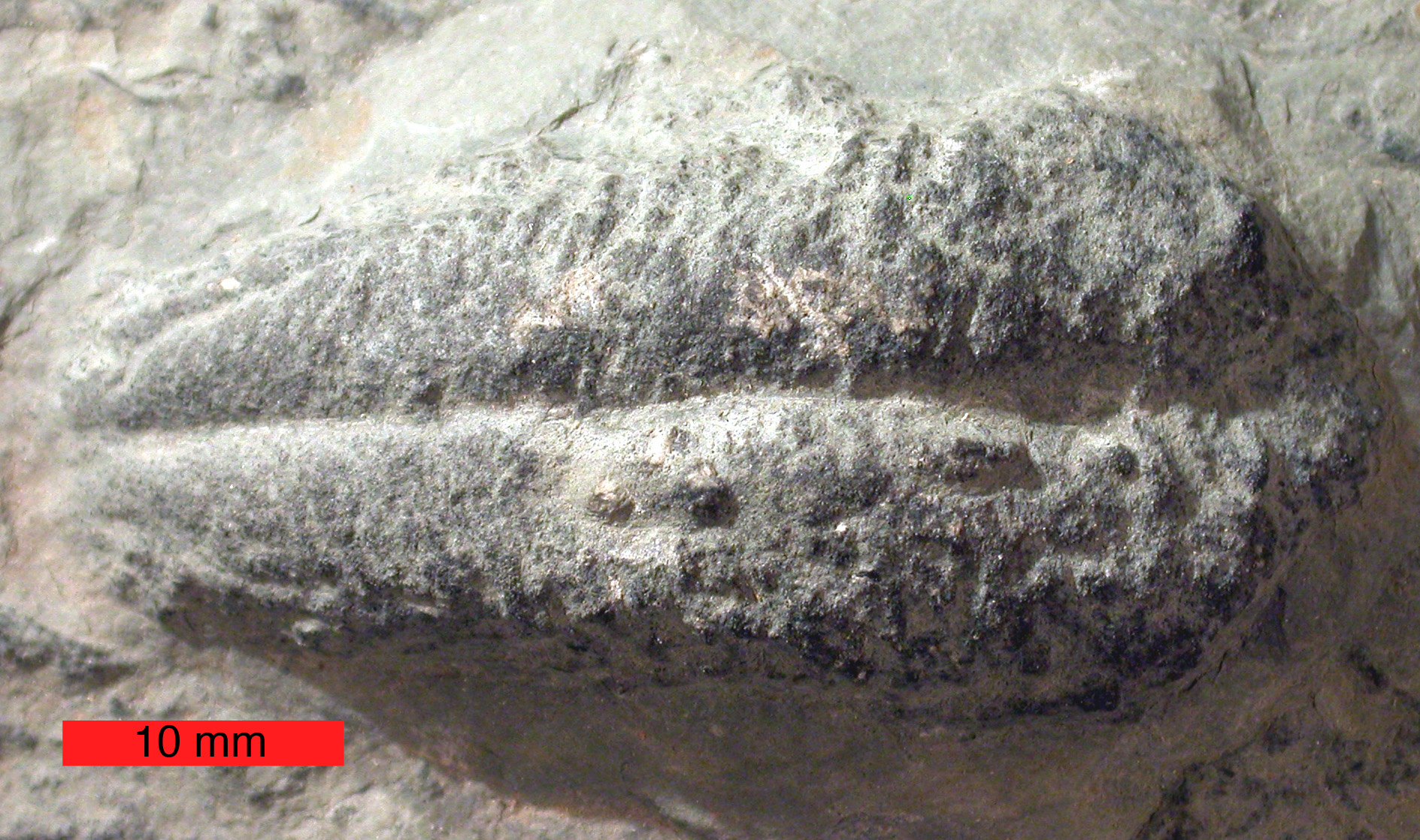
- Fossil found in southern Ohio of the arthropod burrow ichnogenus Rusophycus
  †Rusophycus
  - †Rusophycus biloba

== S ==
- †Saccella
  - †Saccella parva
- †Salpingostoma
  - †Salpingostoma richmondensis – tentative report
- †Samaropsis
- †Sanguinolites
  - †Sanguinolites cuneatus
  - †Sanguinolites hekitoensis – type locality for species
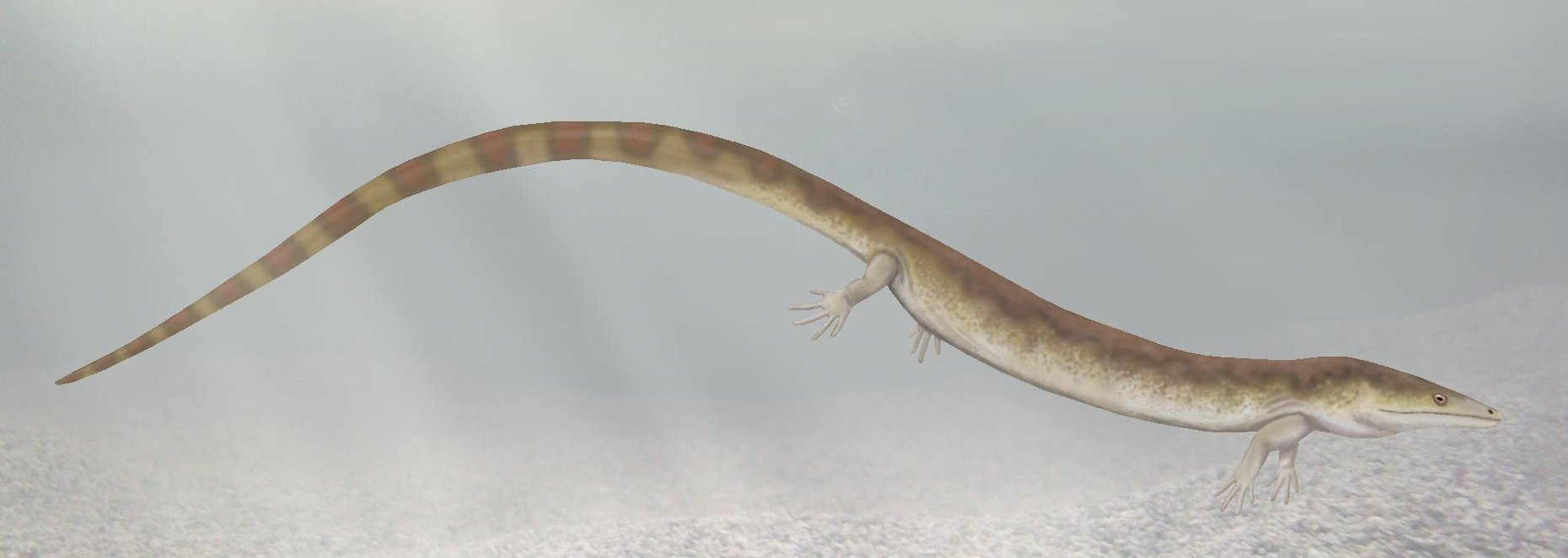
- Restoration of the Carboniferous amphibian Sauropleura
  †Sauropleura – type locality for genus
  - †Sauropleura pectinata – type locality for species
- †Schellwienella
- †Schistoceras
- †Schizambon – tentative report
- †Schizoblatta – type locality for genus
  - †Schizoblatta alutacea – type locality for species
- †Schizocrania
  - †Schizocrania filosa
- †Schizodus
  - †Schizodus acuminatus – type locality for species
  - †Schizodus affinis
  - †Schizodus appressus
  - †Schizodus chesterensis – or unidentified comparable form
  - †Schizodus curtus
  - †Schizodus subcircularis
  - †Schizodus wheeleri
- †Schizolopha
- †Schizophoria
  - †Schizophoria ferronensis
  - †Schizophoria impressa
- †Schlotheimophyllum
  - †Schlotheimophyllum benedicti
  - †Schlotheimophyllum patellatum
- †Schuchertella
  - †Schuchertella interstriata
- †Schuchertoceras
- †Scolithos
  - †Scolithos laxata
- †Sedgwickia – tentative report
- †Semicoscinium
- †Semipora – tentative report
  - †Semipora ehlersi
- †Septopora
  - †Septopora biserialis
  - †Septopora robusta
- †Serpulites
- †Serpulospira
  - †Serpulospira diversiformis
- †Sevillia
  - †Sevillia sevillensis
  - †Sevillia trinucleata
- †Shansiella
  - †Shansiella beckwithana
  - †Shansiella carbonaria
  - †Shansiella insecta
- †Shideleroceras
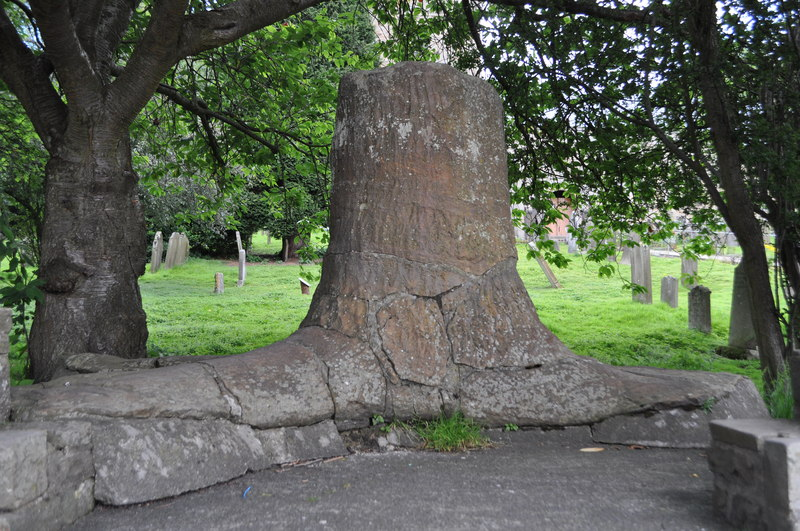
- Fossilized stump of the Carboniferous-Permian club moss relative Sigillaria
  †Sigillaria
  - †Sigillaria brardii
  - †Sigillaria elegans
  - †Sigillaria ficoides
  - †Sigillaria lacoei
  - †Sigillaria laurenciana
  - †Sigillaria mamillaris
  - †Sigillaria orbicularis
  - †Sigillaria pileata – type locality for species
  - †Sigillaria rugosa
- †Sigillariostrobus
- †Silfonocrinus
  - †Silfonocrinus siluricus
- †Silicaster
  - †Silicaster esseri
- †Similodonta – tentative report
- †Sinuites
  - †Sinuites cancellatus
  - †Sinuites granistriatus
  - †Sinuites subcompressa
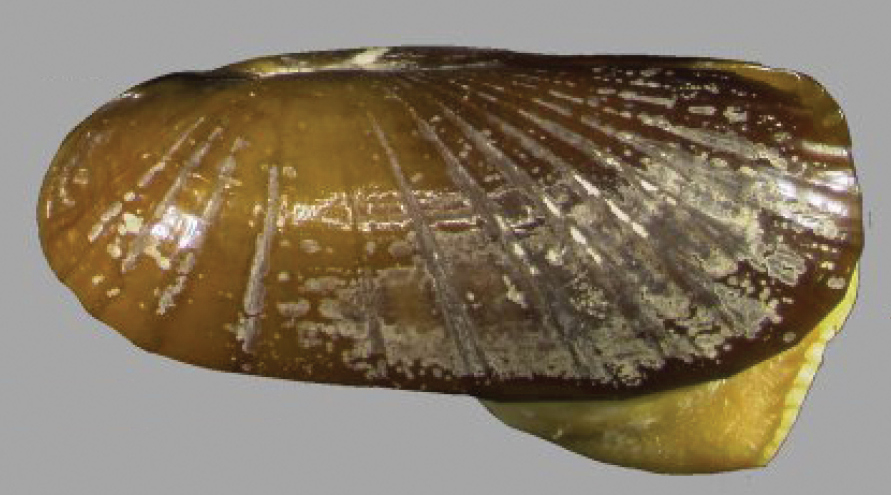
- Modern specimen of the marine bivalve Solemya
  Solemya
  - †Solemya radiata
  - †Solemya sharonensis – type locality for species
- †Soleniscus
  - †Soleniscus aplatus – type locality for species
  - †Soleniscus klipparti
  - †Soleniscus primigenia
  - †Soleniscus primogenium
  - †Soleniscus regularis
  - †Soleniscus typicus
- †Solenomorpha
  - †Solenomorpha lamborni
- †Solisphaeridium
  - †Solisphaeridium astrum
  - †Solisphaeridium clavum
  - †Solisphaeridium folliculum
  - †Solisphaeridium rigispinosum
- †Sowerbyella
  - †Sowerbyella rugosa
- †Spatiopora
- †Sphenolium
- †Sphenophragmus
  - †Sphenophragmus nanus – or unidentified comparable form
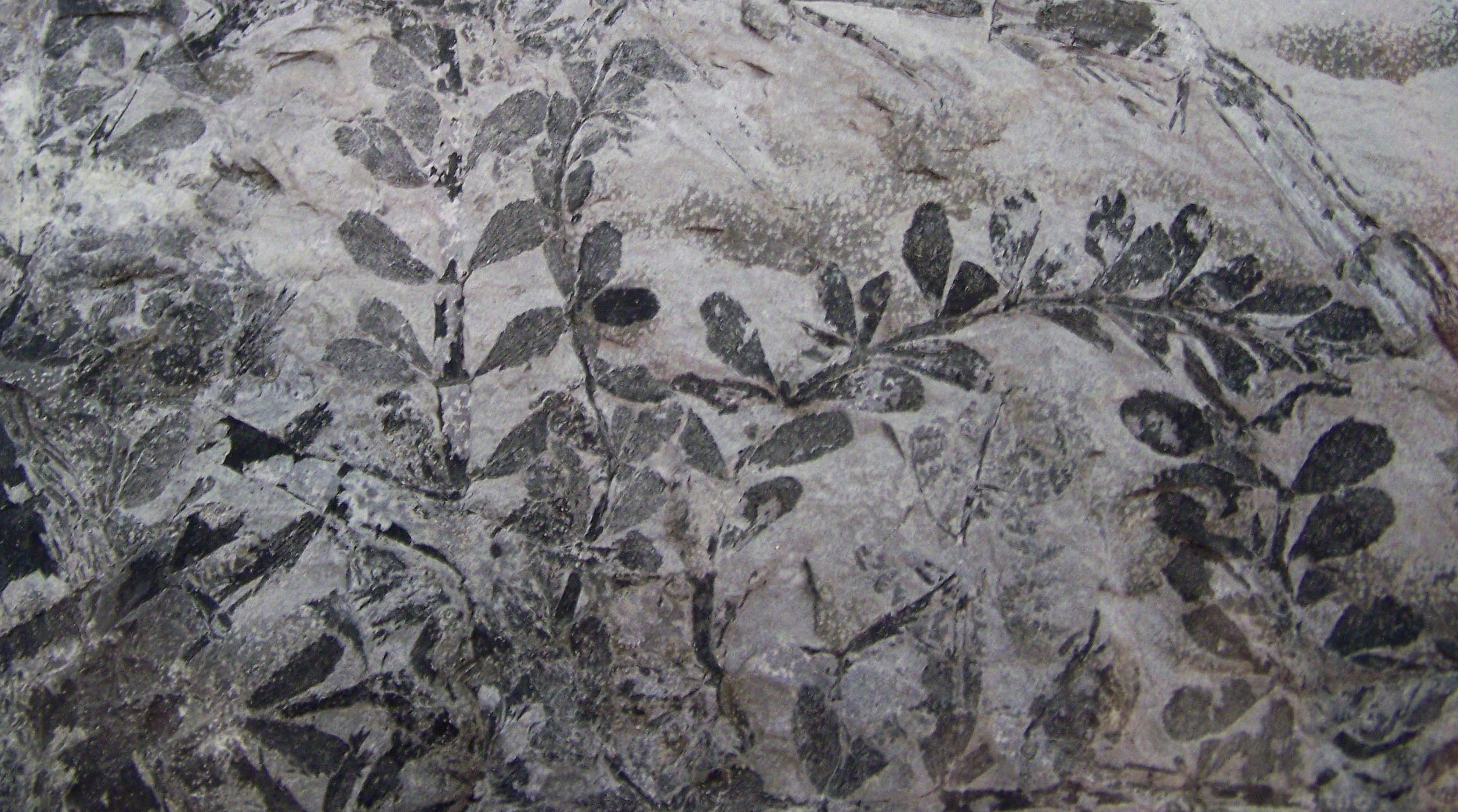
- Fossilized leaves and branches of the Devonian-Triassic horsetail relative Sphenophyllum
  †Sphenophyllum
  - †Sphenophyllum majus
  - †Sphenophyllum oblongifolium
- †Sphenopteris
  - †Sphenopteris elegans – or unidentified comparable form
  - †Sphenopteris minutisecta
- †Sphenosphaera
  - †Sphenosphaera centervillensis – type locality for species
  - †Sphenosphaera fiscellostriata – type locality for species
  - †Sphenosphaera opertus – type locality for species
  - †Sphenosphaera recurvus – type locality for species
- †Sphenothallus
- †Spiloblattina
  - †Spiloblattina variegata – type locality for species
- †Spinocyrtia
  - †Spinocyrtia euryteines – report made of unidentified related form or using admittedly obsolete nomenclature
- †Spinosporites
  - †Spinosporites exiguus
- †Spinulicosta
  - †Spinulicosta spinulicosta
- †Spinyplatyceras
  - †Spinyplatyceras dumosum
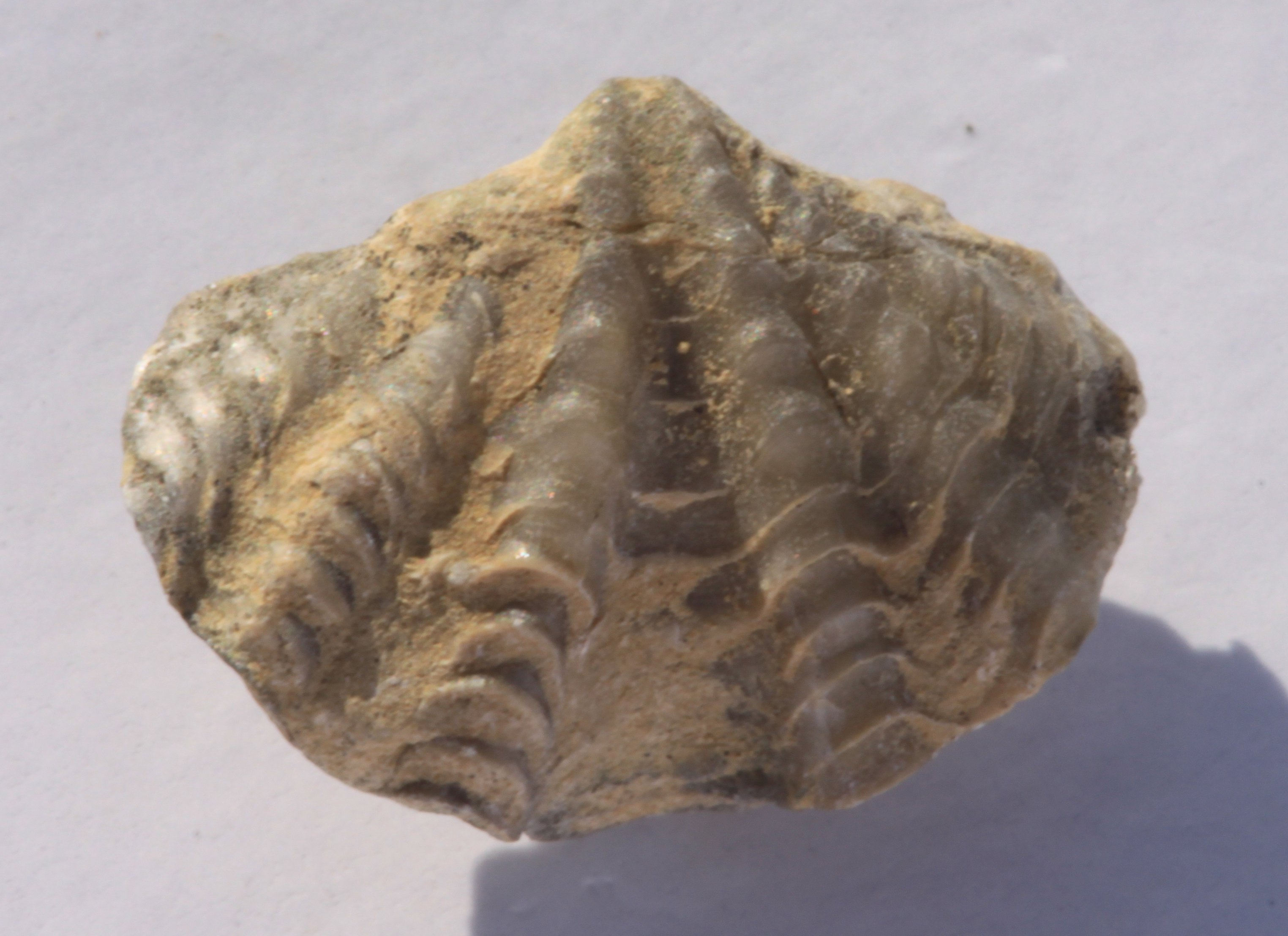
- Fossilized shell of the Late Ordovician-Late Triassic brachiopod Spirifer
  †Spirifer
  - †Spirifer opimus
  - †Spirifer pennatus
- †Spiromphalus
  - †Spiromphalus pervius – type locality for species
- Spiropteris
- Spirorbis
  - †Spirorbis arkonensis
  - †Spirorbis planum
- †Spiroscala
  - †Spiroscala solida
- †Spongentactinella
  - †Spongentactinella veles
- †Sporangites
  - †Sporangites huronensis
- †Spyroceras
- †Staufferoceras
- †Stegocoelia
  - †Stegocoelia copei – or unidentified comparable form
- †Stegops
  - †Stegops newberryi – type locality for species
- †Stellinium
  - †Stellinium cristatum
  - †Stellinium inflatum
  - †Stellinium octoaster
- †Stelodictyon
- †Stereoaster
  - †Stereoaster squamosus
- †Stereostylus
  - †Stereostylus amesensis
- †Stereotoechus
  - †Stereotoechus typicus – or unidentified comparable form
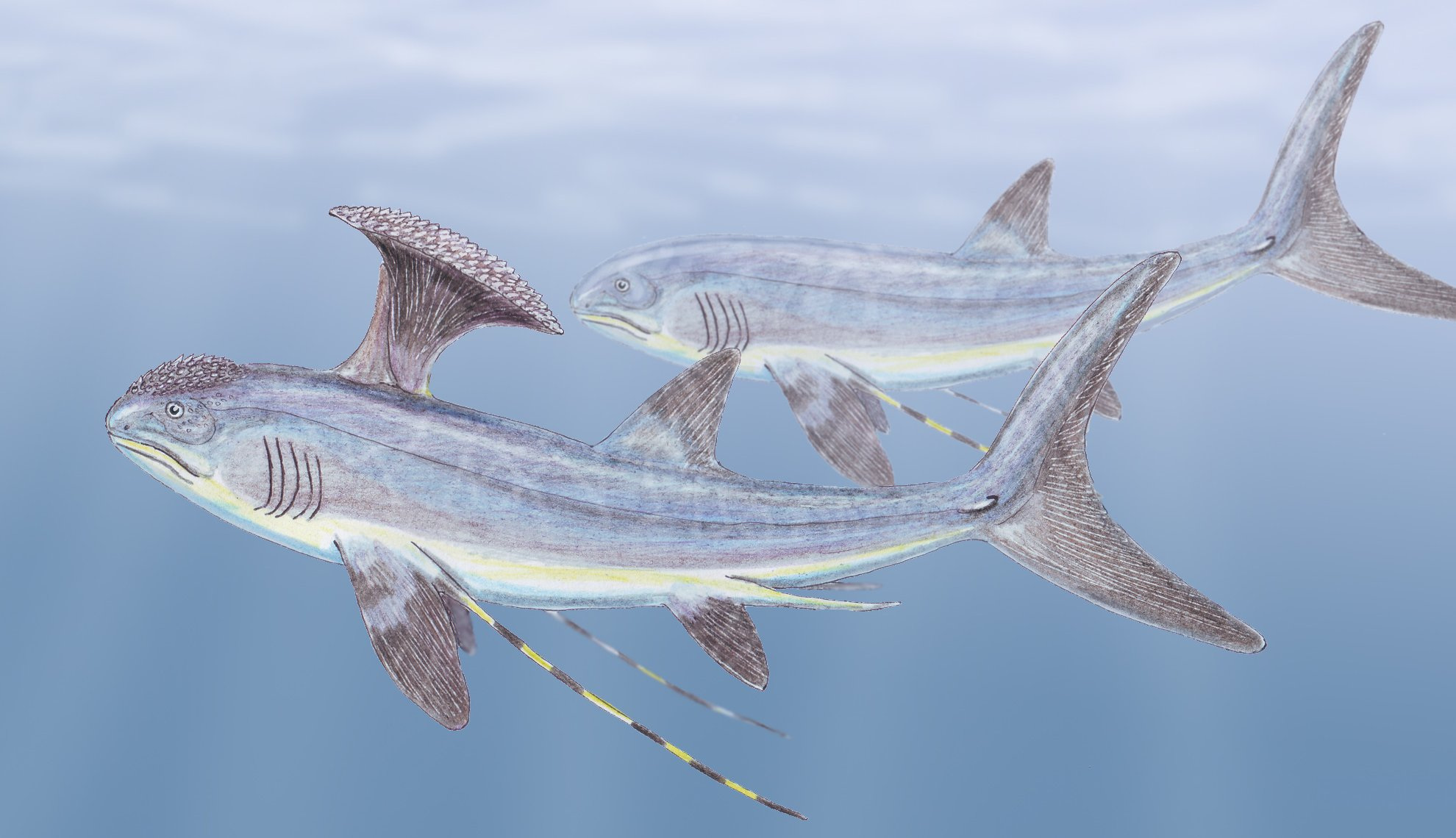
- Life restorations of a male (foreground) and female (background) of the Late Devonian-Carboniferous Chimaera relative Stethacanthus
  †Stethacanthus
  - †Stethacanthus altonensis
- †Stibarocrinus
  - †Stibarocrinus centervillensis
- †Stictoporella
- †Stictoporina
  - †Stictoporina granulifera
- †Stigmatella
  - †Stigmatella catenulata
  - †Stigmatella crenulata
  - †Stigmatella dychei
- Stomatopora
- †Straparollus
  - †Straparollus hecale – or unidentified comparable form
  - †Straparollus rudis – or unidentified comparable form
- †Strataster
  - †Strataster devonicus
- †Streblochondria
- †Streblopteria
  - †Streblopteria oklahomensis
- †Streblotrypa
  - †Streblotrypa anomala
  - †Streblotrypa hamiltonensis
- †Streptaster
  - †Streptaster vorticellatus
- †Streptelasma
  - †Streptelasma divaricans
- †Striatopora
  - †Striatopora flexuosa
  - †Striatopora intermittens
- †Strobeus
  - †Strobeus brevis
  - †Strobeus immanis
  - †Strobeus intercalaris
  - †Strobeus paludinaeformis
- †Stromatocerium
  - †Stromatocerium granulosum
- †Stromatopora
- †Strombodes
  - †Strombodes socialis
- †Strophalosia
  - †Strophalosia truncata
- †Stropheodonta
  - †Stropheodonta demissa
- †Strophodonta
  - †Strophodonta demissa – report made of unidentified related form or using admittedly obsolete nomenclature
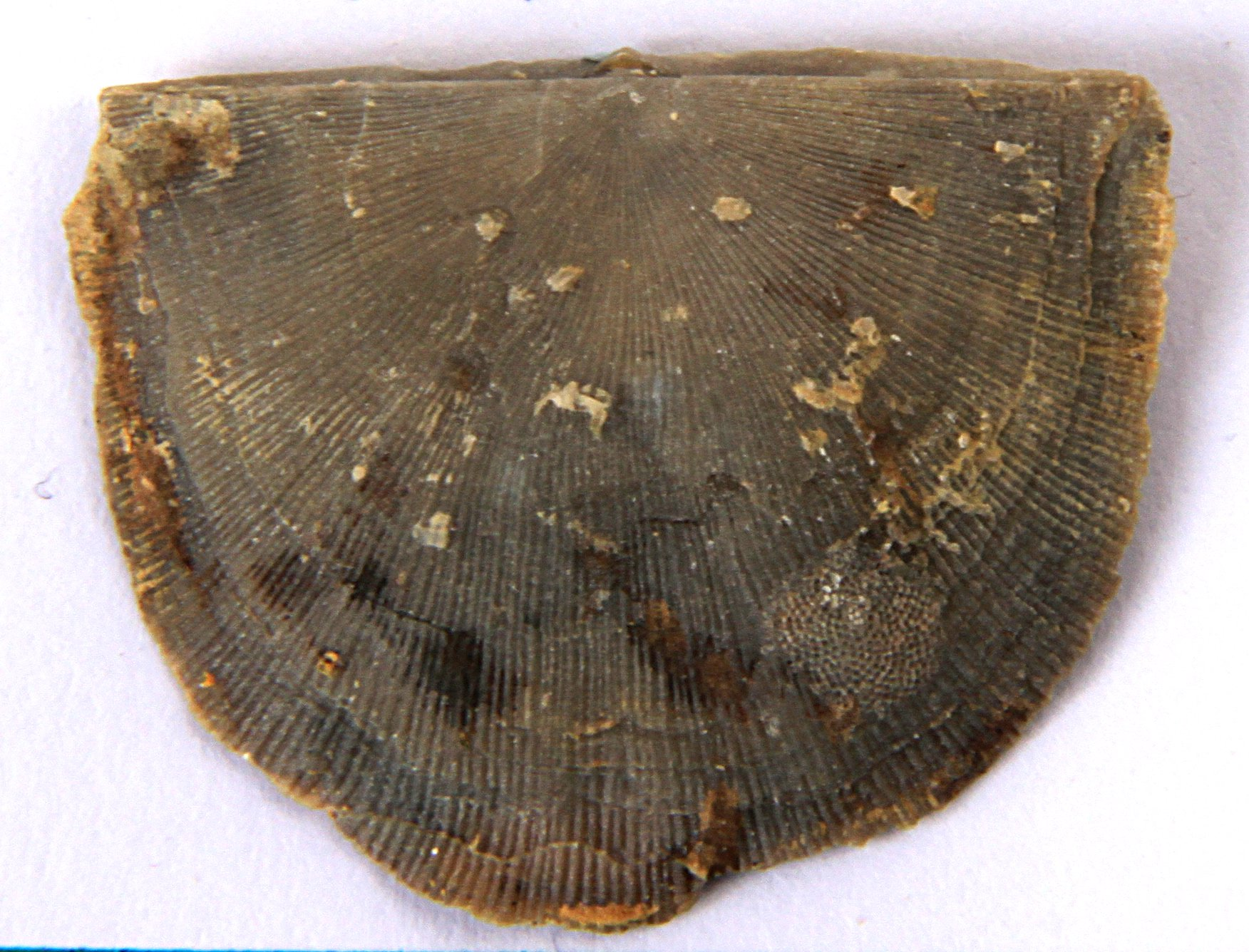
- Fossilized shell of the Ordovician-Silurian brachiopod Strophomena
  †Strophomena
  - †Strophomena concordensis
  - †Strophomena erratica
  - †Strophomena extenuata
  - †Strophomena maysvillensis
  - †Strophomena neglecta
  - †Strophomena nutans
  - †Strophomena planoconvexa
  - †Strophomena planumbona
  - †Strophomena sulcata
- †Strophostylus
- †Sturgeonospira – type locality for genus
  - †Sturgeonospira tortula – type locality for species
- †Stygetoblatta – type locality for genus
  - †Stygetoblatta latipennis – type locality for species
- †Styliolina
  - †Styliolina fissurella
- †Stylonema
  - †Stylonema robusta
- †Subulites
  - †Subulites planilateralis – type locality for species
- †Sulcoretepora
  - †Sulcoretepora deissi
  - †Sulcoretepora incisurata
- †Synhomalonotus
- †Syntomopterus
  - †Syntomopterus richardsoni
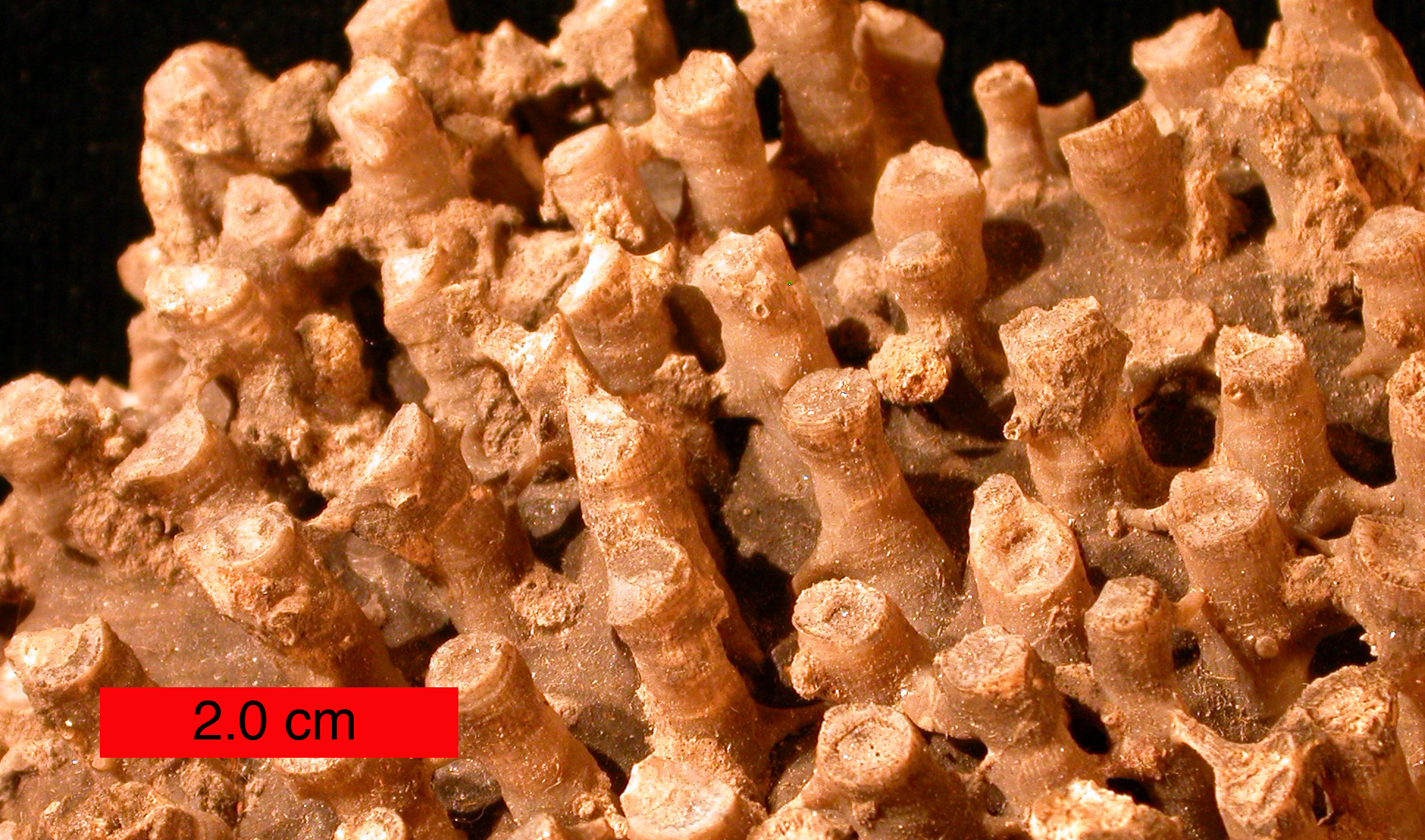
- Fossil of the Devonian tabulate coral Syringopora
  †Syringopora – tentative report
  - †Syringopora reteformis
- †Syringostroma
  - †Syringostroma cylindricum
  - †Syringostroma densum
  - †Syringostroma nodulatum
  - †Syringostroma pustulosum
- †Syringothyris
  - †Syringothyris bedfordensis
- †Syscioblatta
  - †Syscioblatta anomala – type locality for species
  - †Syscioblatta minor – type locality for species
  - †Syscioblatta misera – type locality for species
  - †Syscioblatta obscura – type locality for species
  - †Syscioblatta steubenvilleana – type locality for species
- †Sysciophlebia
  - †Sysciophlebia acutipennis – type locality for species
  - †Sysciophlebia adumbrata – type locality for species
  - †Sysciophlebia affinis – type locality for species
  - †Sysciophlebia balteata
  - †Sysciophlebia benedicta – type locality for species
  - †Sysciophlebia hybrida – type locality for species
  - †Sysciophlebia nana – type locality for species
  - †Sysciophlebia obtusa – type locality for species
  - †Sysciophlebia picta – type locality for species
  - †Sysciophlebia rotundata – type locality for species
  - †Sysciophlebia schucherti – type locality for species
  - †Sysciophlebia scudderi – type locality for species
  - †Sysciophlebia variegata – type locality for species
  - †Sysciophlebia whitei – type locality for species

== T ==
- †Taeniaster
  - †Taeniaster elegans
- †Taeniopteris
  - †Taeniopteris lescuriana
  - †Taeniopteris newberriana
- †Tamiobatis
  - †Tamiobatis vetustus
- †Tanaocrinus
- †Tasmanites
- †Technophora
- †Technophorus – type locality for genus
  - †Technophorus faberi – type locality for species
- †Teichichnus
- †Temnocheilus
  - †Temnocheilus forbesianus
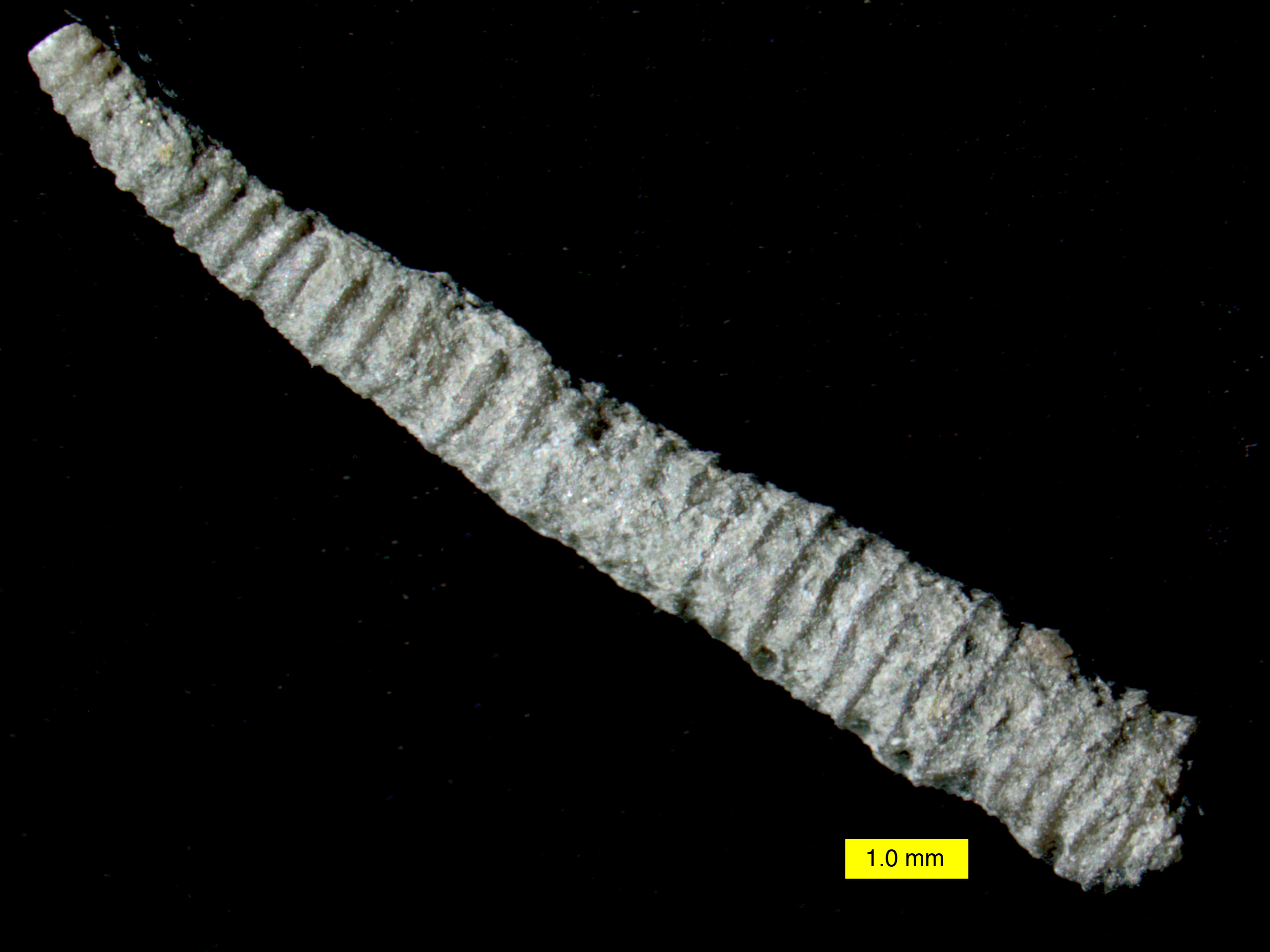
- Fossilized shell of the Early Ordovician-Late Devonian probable mollusc Tentaculites
  †Tentaculites
  - †Tentaculites bellulus
  - †Tentaculites gracilistriatus
- †Tetradium
- †Tetranota
  - †Tetranota bidorsata
- †Tetrentactinia
  - †Tetrentactinia barysphaera
  - †Tetrentactinia gracilispinosa
  - †Tetrentactinia quadrispinosa
  - †Tetrentactinia somphosphaera
  - †Tetrentactinia somphozona
  - †Tetrentactinia spongacea
  - †Tetrentactinia teuchestes
- †Thamnoptychia
  - †Thamnoptychia alpenensis
  - †Thamnoptychia labyrinthica
  - †Thamnoptychia minuitissima
  - †Thamnoptychia projecta – tentative report
  - †Thamnoptychia silicensis
- †Thymospora
  - †Thymospora obscura
  - †Thymospora pseudothiessenii
- †Tirocrinus
  - †Tirocrinus trochos
- †Tomoceras
  - †Tomoceras gilliana – or unidentified comparable form
- †Torispora
  - †Torispora securis
- †Tornacia
  - †Tornacia stela
- †Tornoceras
  - †Tornoceras uniagnulare
  - †Tornoceras uniangulare
- †Toryniferella
- †Trachydomia
- †Tremanotus
- †Trematis
  - †Trematis millepunctata
  - †Trematis millepuntata
  - †Trematis reticularis
- †Trematopora
- †Trepospira
  - †Trepospira illinoisensis
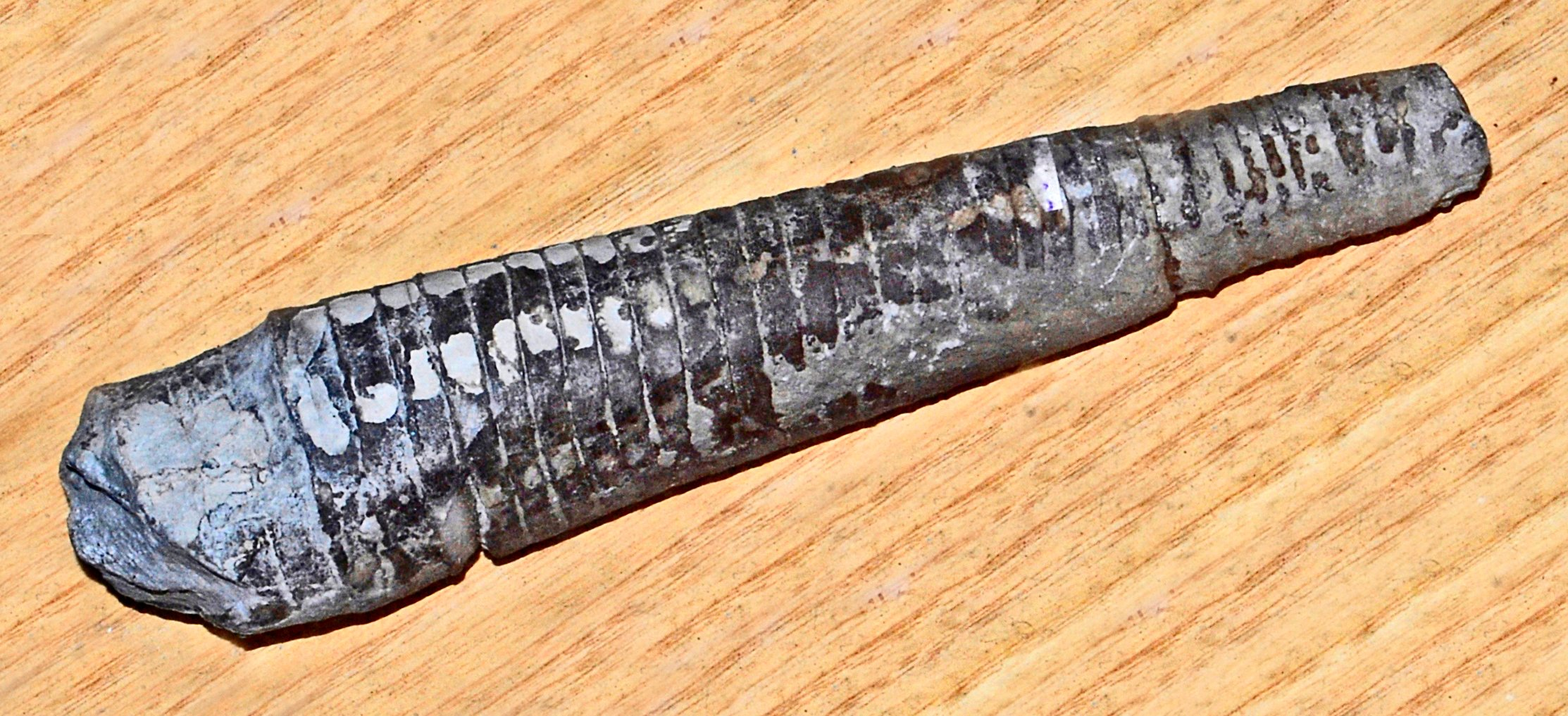
- Fossilized shell of the Ordovician nautiloid cephalopod Treptoceras
  †Treptoceras
  - †Treptoceras byrnesi
  - †Treptoceras cincinnatiensis
  - †Treptoceras duseri
  - †Treptoceras fosteri
- †Triarthrus
- †Triendoceras – tentative report
  - †Triendoceras davisi
- †Trigonoglossa
  - †Trigonoglossa nebrascensis
- †Trigrammaria
- †Trilonche
  - †Trilonche cancellicula
  - †Trilonche prolata
- †Trimerella
- †Triquitrites
  - †Triquitrites additus
  - †Triquitrites bransonii
  - †Triquitrites crassus
  - †Triquitrites minutus
  - †Triquitrites sculptilis
  - †Triquitrites spinosus
  - †Triquitrites subspinosus – or unidentified comparable form
  - †Triquitrites tribullatus
- †Trocholites
- †Trochonema
- †Trochonemopsis
  - †Trochonemopsis meekanum
- †Troedssonoceras
- †Tropidodiscus
  - †Tropidodiscus vesculilineatus – type locality for species
- †Tropidoleptus
  - †Tropidoleptus carinatus
- †Truncatiramus – now regarded as a jr. synonym of Erettopterus
  - †Truncatiramus perryensis
- Trypetesa
  - †Trypetesa caveata
- †Trypherocrinus
  - †Trypherocrinus brassfieldensis
- †Tuberculatosporites
  - †Tuberculatosporites robustus
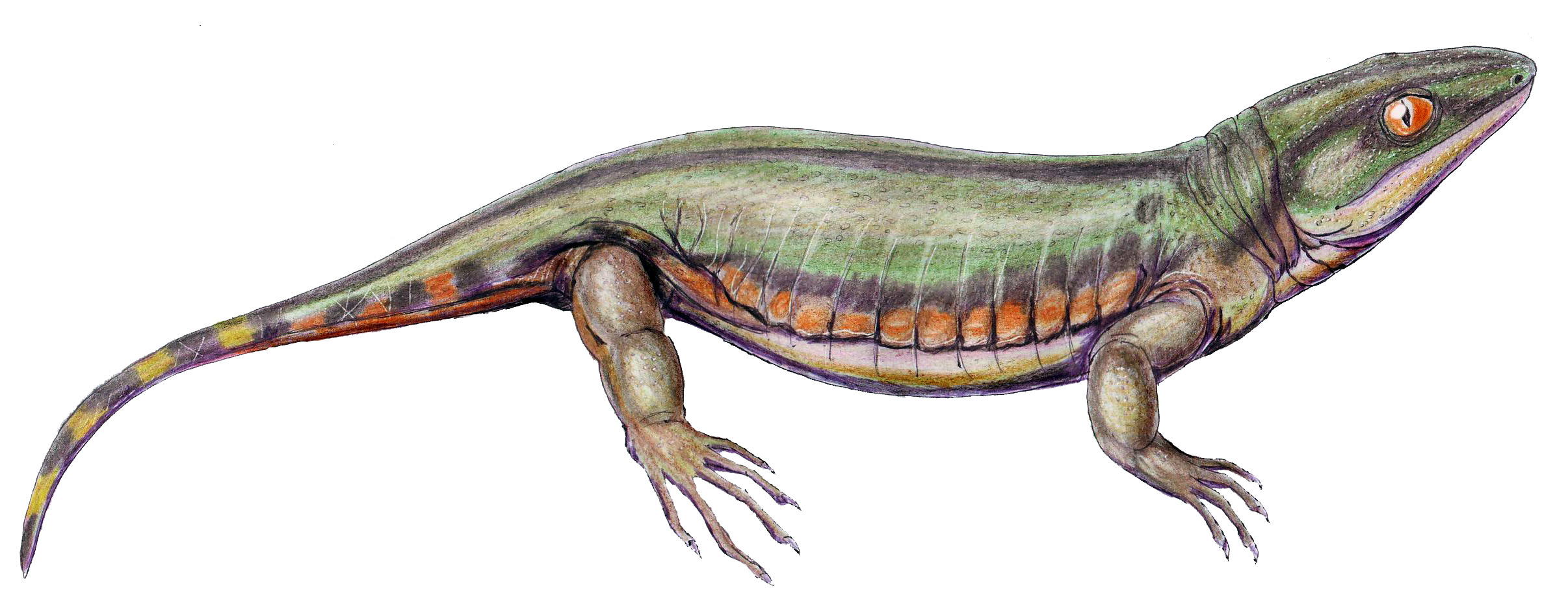
- Life restoration of the Carboniferous amphibian Tuditanus
  †Tuditanus – type locality for genus
  - †Tuditanus punctulatus – type locality for species
- †Turbocrinus
  - †Turbocrinus paunctum
- †Turbonopsis
  - †Turbonopsis shumardii
- †Typanocrinus
  - †Typanocrinus strombos

== U ==
- †Ulrichia
  - †Ulrichia nodosa
- †Umbotropis
  - †Umbotropis filitexta – type locality for species
- †Uncinisphaera
  - †Uncinisphaera lappa
- †Unellium
  - †Unellium ampullium
  - †Unellium elongatum
  - †Unellium oscitans
- †Unklesbayella – type locality for genus
  - †Unklesbayella geinitzi
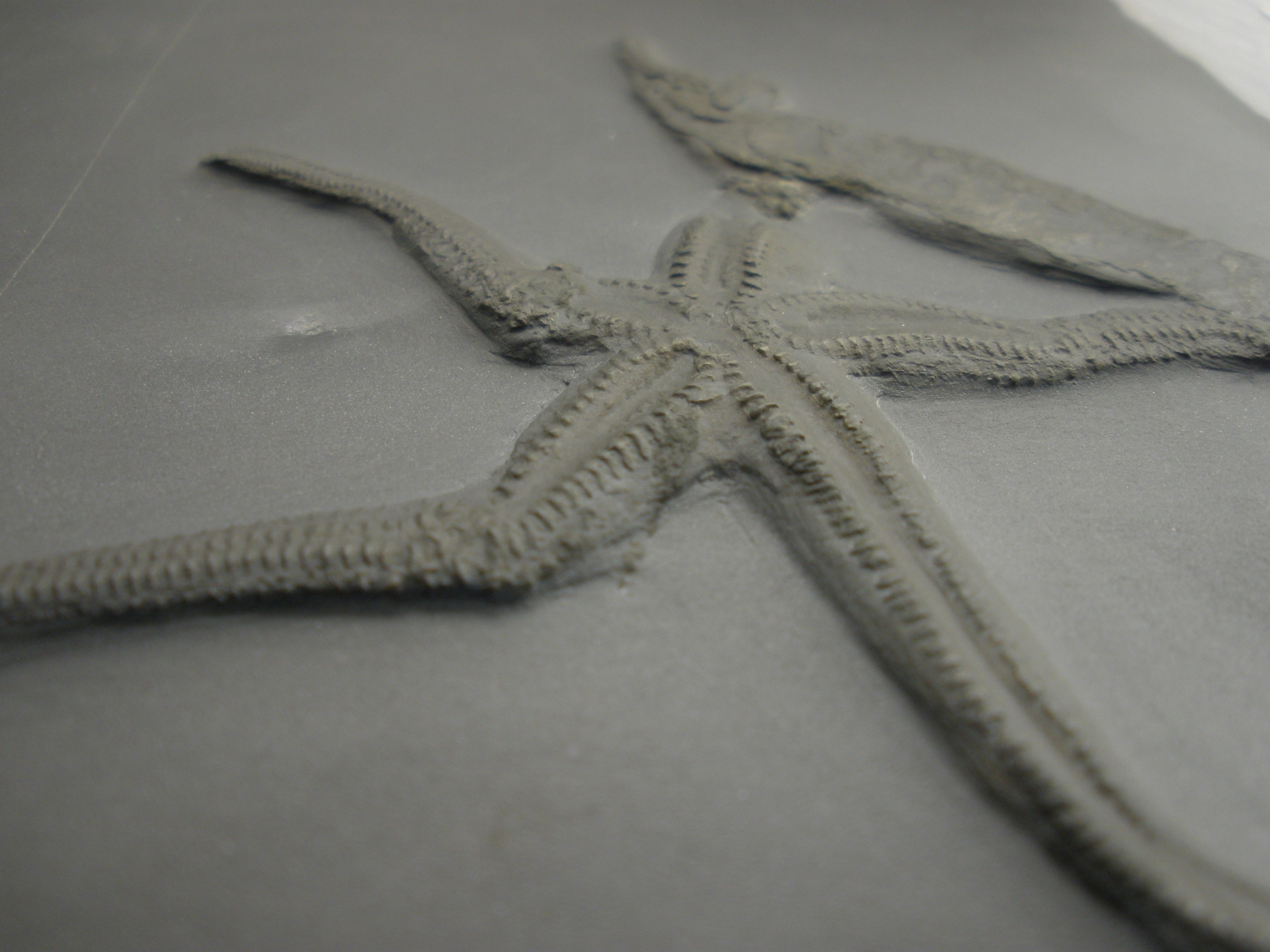
- Fossil of the Ordovician-Devonian sea star Urasterella
  †Urasterella
  - †Urasterella grandis

== V ==
- †Vanuxemia
  - †Vanuxemia waynesvillensis – type locality for species
- †Vaupelia
- †Vermiforichnus
  - †Vermiforichnus clarkei – or unidentified comparable form
- †Verrucosisporites
  - †Verrucosisporites cerosus
  - †Verrucosisporites donarii
  - †Verrucosisporites henshawensis
  - †Verrucosisporites microtuberosus
  - †Verrucosisporites microtuerosus
  - †Verrucosisporites verrucosus
- †Veryhachium
  - †Veryhachium roscidum
  - †Veryhachium trispinosoides
- †Vesicaspora
  - †Vesicaspora wilsonii
- †Vestispora
  - †Vestispora fenestrata
  - †Vestispora laevigata
- †Vinella
- †Vinlandostrophia
  - †Vinlandostrophia acutilirata
  - †Vinlandostrophia ponderosa
- †Vorticina
  - †Vorticina cyrtolites

== W ==
- †Waagenella
  - †Waagenella crassus
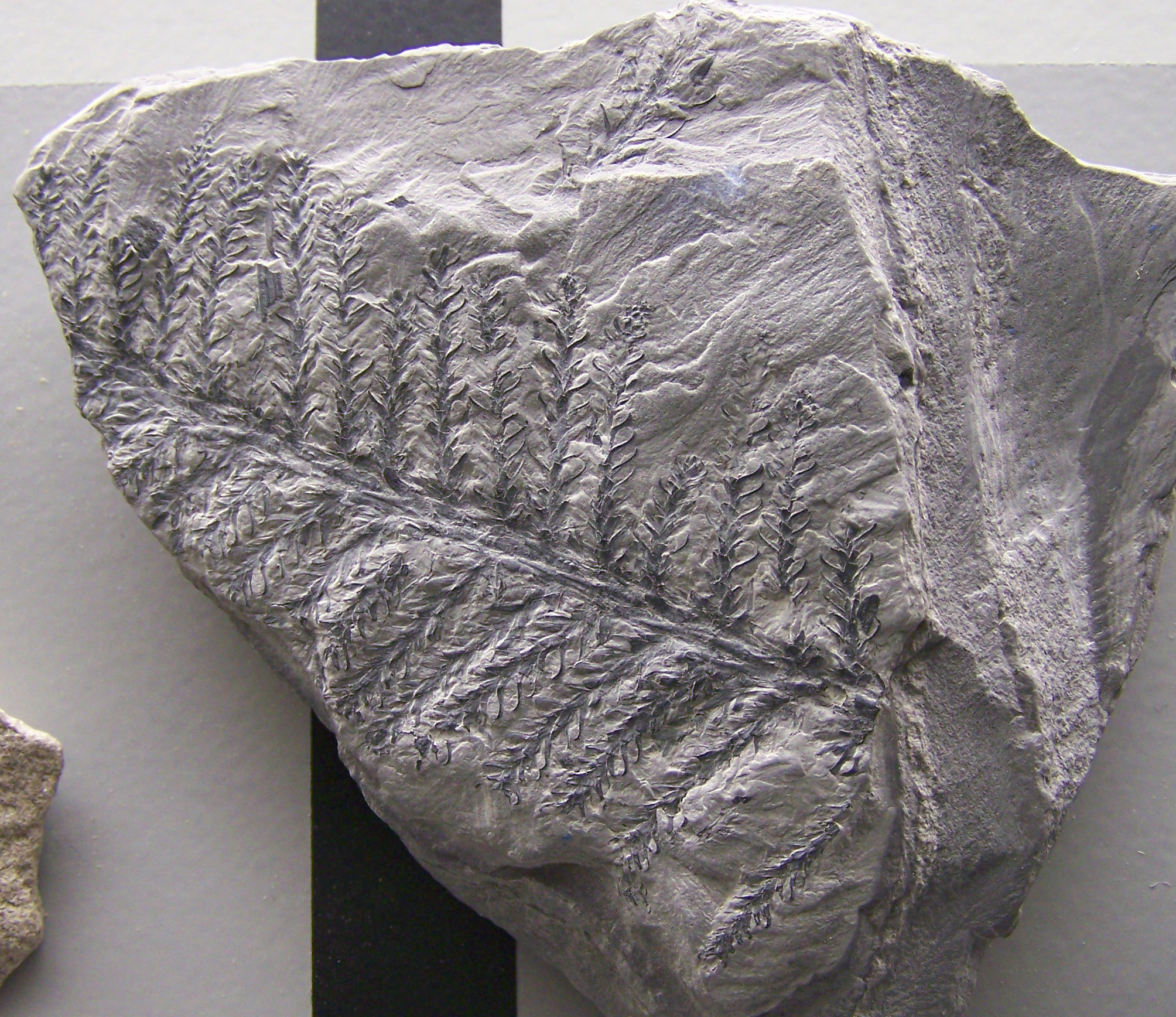
- Fossilized foliage of the Carboniferous-Permian conifer Walchia
  †Walchia
- †Walchiostrobus
- †Walliserodus
  - †Walliserodus sancticlairi
- †Welleria – tentative report
- †Westonoceras
- †Whidbornella
- †Whiteavesia
- †Whitfieldella
- †Whitfieldoceras
- †Wilkingia
  - †Wilkingia andrewsi
  - †Wilkingia maxvillensis
  - †Wilkingia terminale
- †Wilsonites
  - †Wilsonites vesicatus
- †Worthenia
  - †Worthenia parvula
  - †Worthenia speciosa
  - †Worthenia strigillata
  - †Worthenia tabulata
- †Wurmiella
  - †Wurmiella excavata

== X ==
- †Xenocrinus
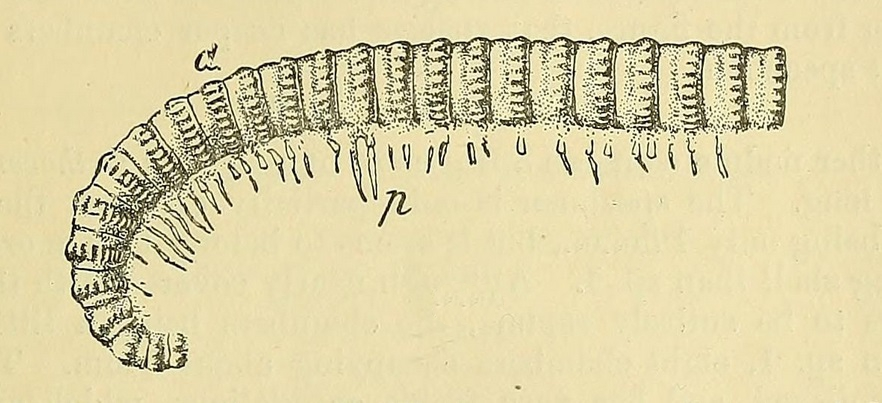
- Illustration of a fossil of the Carboniferous millipede Xyloiulus
  †Xyloiulus
  - †Xyloiulus bairdi – type locality for species
- †Xysmacrinus
  - †Xysmacrinus greenensis

== Z ==
- †Zascinaspis
- †Zirocrinus
  - †Zirocrinus litos
- †Zittelloceras
- †Zonalosporites
  - †Zonalosporites ellipticus
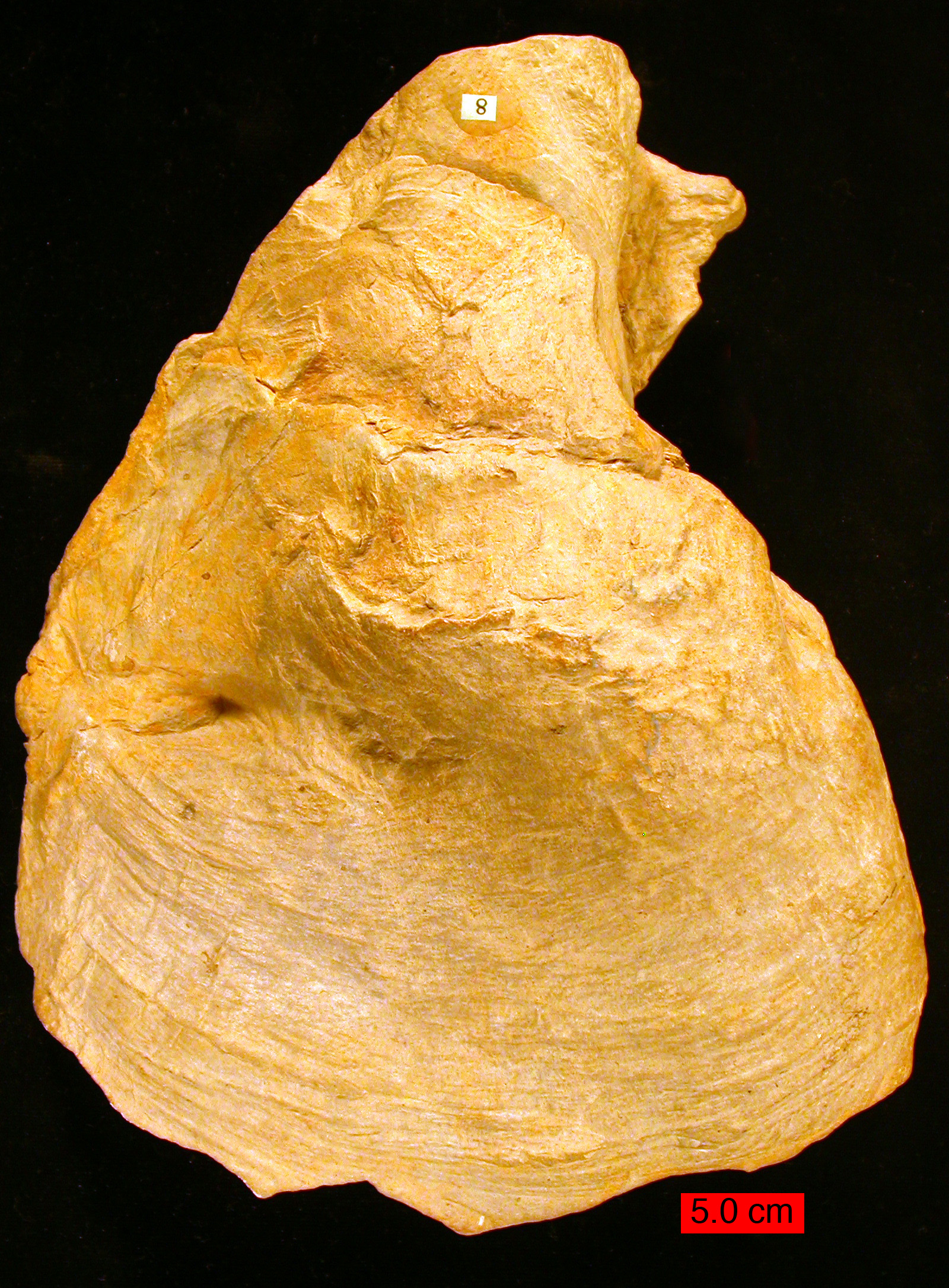
- Fossil of the feeding trace ichnogenus Zoophycos
  †Zoophycos
- †Zygocycloides
  - †Zygocycloides magnus
- †Zygospira
  - †Zygospira cincinnatiensis
  - †Zygospira modesta
