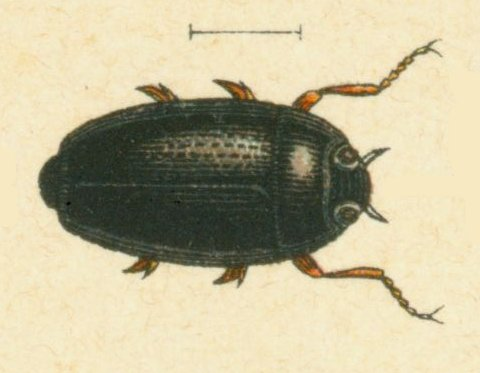

Scientific classification
- Kingdom: Animalia
- Phylum: Arthropoda
- Clade: Pancrustacea
- Class: Insecta
- Order: Coleoptera
- Suborder: Adephaga
- Family: Gyrinidae
- Genus: Gyrinus
- Species: G. minutus

Binomial name
- Gyrinus minutus Fabricius, 1798

= Gyrinus minutus =

Species of beetle

Gyrinus minutus is a species of whirligig beetle in the family Gyrinidae. It is found in North America and Europe.The body is entirely black with a dull appearance due to its microsculpture. G. minutus typically inhabit open edges of larger water bodies like lakes and reservoirs but also reside in sparsely vegetated ponds and slow-flowing river parts. Their swimming abilities are weaker than other gyrinids, and they often disperse in groups when disturbed. Reproduction begins in early spring with mating on water surfaces, followed by egg-laying on aquatic plants. Larvae hatch after a week, growing quickly and reaching maturity within three to four weeks. They are capable of flight, and adults can be found in new locations throughout the summer. G. minutus lacks volatile production for predator defense or has minimal amounts, likely due to its behavior and habitat preferences. Interestingly, while G. minutus rarely aggregates, it can still respond to alarm signals from other species.

== Geographic Range ==
=== North America ===
In North America, the distribution of G. minutus extends across Canada and Alaska. Its range is primarily limited to the more northern regions of Manitoba and Saskatchewan but is widespread in the Northwest Territories, Yukon Territories, and Alaska. In Alberta, it is found as far south as Edmonton, excluding the Rocky Mountains, where it has been observed at least as far south as Jasper. There are also records of its presence extending south along the Rocky Mountains into Wyoming and Colorado. It’s likely to be discovered in the southern Canadian Rockies and Montana. Throughout its extensive North American range, G. minutus maintains a relatively consistent appearance. Researchers noted no differences between specimens from the Nearctic and Palearctic regions. Male specimens from Wyoming and Colorado tend to be slightly larger than those from Canada, though females show little variation.

=== Europe ===
This species is the only European species of the subgenus Gyrinulus Zaitzev. It is among the most geographically widespread members of its family, with a holarctic distribution. It can be found throughout Canada and North America and is locally common across the northern Palaearctic region, spanning from Spain to northeastern China, including Sakhalin and Hokkaido. In Europe, it predominantly appears in the northern regions, reaching as far as the UK and the Arctic Circle in Fennoscandia. It is absent from the most southerly areas and North Africa. In the UK, its distribution is largely northern, and its population has declined in many southern regions in recent years. Currently, it is primarily found in a few scattered heathland locations in England and Snowdonia in Wales. However, it remains relatively common in Ireland and Scotland, including the Western Isles and Shetland.

== Habitat ==
Adults are year-round, spending the winter on submerged vegetation. They remain active from February to late autumn, with peak abundance occurring in mid-to-late-summer. Typically, they are found near the open margins of larger water bodies like lakes and reservoirs, but they also inhabit sparsely vegetated ponds in moorlands and slow-flowing parts of rivers. Unlike other gyrinids, their swimming abilities are weak, and their less pronounced gyrations are obvious in the field. When disturbed, they may dive, but a group often disperses by swimming away from the disturbance.

== Life History ==
The pupal stage is short, and adults emerge within approximately a week. In laboratory settings, the entire life cycle from egg to adult spans about seven weeks. This species can fly, and adults can appear at new locations throughout the summer.

== Genetics ==
Autosome pair 1 has a relative chromosome length (RCL) of approximately 14.5, and the RCLs decrease relatively evenly across the karyotype to around 5.5 in pairs 7–13. Pair 10 exhibits an obvious secondary constriction. The majority of the autosomes are either metacentric or submetacentric, with pairs 9 and 12 approaching a subacrocentric shape. The X chromosome, which is the longest in the nucleus, has an RCL of about 20 and is metacentric.

== Mating ==
Reproduction starts in early spring with mating on the water surface, followed by egg-laying on aquatic plants in late spring. Larvae hatch after about one week. These larvae are entirely aquatic and do not need to swim to the surface for oxygen. They are predators that move among underwater plants and hunt for prey. They grow quickly and reach maturity within three to four weeks. Once mature, they leave the water to create a cocoon on the margins of the water or emerging plants.

== Physiology ==
The body is completely black and appears dull because of its intricate microsculpture. Additionally, in many individuals, there's an obvious metallic bronze sheen on the sides of the wing covers (elytra). The underside and legs are light brown or orange. The pronotum has a narrow, smooth longitudinal central line that stands out against its textured surface, while the mesosternum has a clear, longitudinal median groove.

== Pygidial Glands and Predator Defense ==
Gyrinid beetles have developed an intricate chemical mechanism that functions both as a means of communication and defense against predators. These beetles have pygidial glands that produce a secretion composed mainly of two parts: a high molecular fraction and a low molecular fraction. The high molecular fraction contains a varying mix of four norsesquiterpenes: gyrinidal, isogyrinidial, gyrinidone, and gyrinidione. These norsesquiterpenes are harmful to fish. Both fish and newts tend to avoid consuming gyrinids when they come into contact with them. The low molecular (volatile) fraction includes alcohols, ketones, and aldehydes, such as 3-methyl-1-butanol and 3-methyl-1-butanal. This fraction is believed to act as an alarm substance within the general signaling or defense system of the gyrinids.

The volatile compounds could play a role not only in defense mechanisms but also in their communication system. Isoamyl alcohol is even an irritant for humans. These volatile substances might be effective for communication, as signals transmitted through the air can be rapidly detected across open water surfaces. The production of pygidial secretion by gyrinids fluctuates throughout the seasons, with one peak occurring in late summer and another in spring.

Gyrinus minutus either has no volatile fraction or produces it in minimal amounts. Thus, G. minutus does not emit the typical gyrinids scent which is detectable by the human nose. The absence of volatiles seems to be linked to the behavior and habitat preferences of the beetles: G. minutus tends to live alone among emergent vegetation in lakes.

Researchers have also compared G. minutus with two other species: G. substriatus and G. aeratus, both producing 3-methyl-l-butanal and 3-methyl-l-butanol when irritated. G. substriatus is commonly found in groups in rivers and G. aeratus in lakes (both on the open water surface). In contrast, G. minutus prefers more sheltered habitats like small ponds or the vegetated edges of lakes where the risk of predation from fish is likely reduced compared to the more open regions of lakes. The evolution of chemical defense and alarm signals appears to be linked to the tendency of these beetles to form groups or aggregations. Though G. minutus rarely occurs in large aggregates, it can still respond to the alarm signals released by other Gyrinus species. Occasionally, individuals of G. minutus may present within groups of a scented species (for example, G. aeratus) on open water surfaces, which are outside their typical habitats. The presence could be seen as a strategy to benefit from the alarm volatiles emitted by individuals of another species. This may help them evade approaching threats, a phenomenon known as Batesian mimicry.

Researchers have identified three functions of pygidial secretion: (1) preventing microorganisms from attaching to the body, (2) deterring predators, and (3) enhancing the wettability of the chitin. Additionally, researchers demonstrated its alarm function. 'Alarm call' in gyrinid beetles is recognized across different species. The release of alarm volatiles in response to "danger" above the water surface, such as moving objects that cast shadows, suggests that bird predation is a significant threat to gyrinids. Indeed, adult gyrinids have been identified as prey for at least two European bird species: the black tern and the greenshank. The properties of the various pygidial compounds are not fully understood. However, the high molecular weight substances gyrinidal and gyrinidione are the active components responsible for fish rejection. Gyrinids with both norsesquiterpenes and volatiles are more effectively protected against fish predation compared to those with only norsesquiterpenes. Besides, it was shown that fish are more reluctant to eat a gyrinid containing volatiles. It was observed that rainbow trout usually performed oral flushing on captured gyrinid beetles but spent more effort flushing if the beetle was to be consumed. They did not flush prey that they found palatable, indicating that oral flushing serves as a method to eliminate harmful chemicals from potential prey. However, experienced fish were quicker to reject gyrinids containing volatiles compared to those without. If it’s too hard to remove the chemicals, the fish would not spend energy on flushing; instead, they immediately spit out the prey. This suggests that volatiles enhance the distastefulness of gyrinids.

An outstanding question for future research is whether G. minutus has lost the capability to produce volatile alarm substances, or if it never possessed this ability. The absence of production in G. minutus could potentially indicate an original state. Furthermore, considering the small size of G. minutus, the production of volatiles may be less advantageous, as its smaller size likely makes it a less appealing prey for vertebrates.
