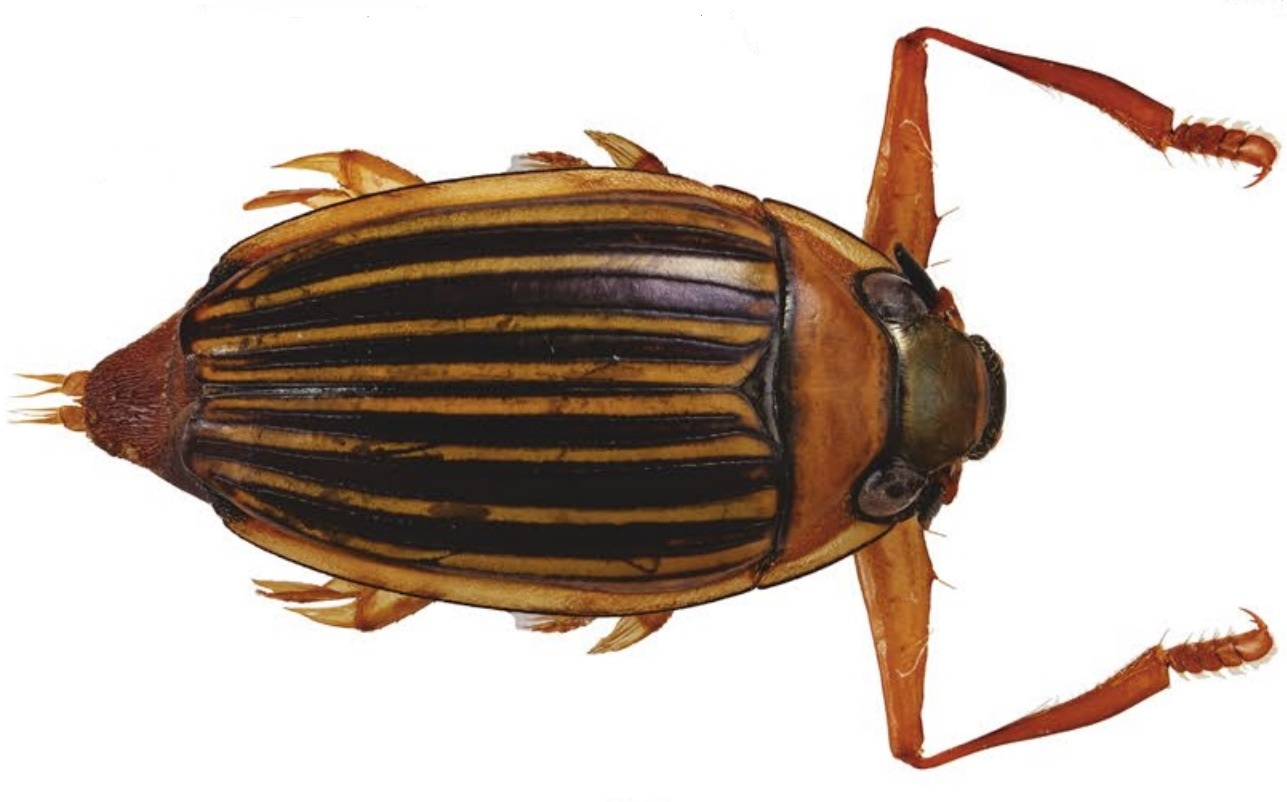

Scientific classification
- Kingdom: Animalia
- Phylum: Arthropoda
- Clade: Pancrustacea
- Class: Insecta
- Order: Coleoptera
- Suborder: Adephaga
- Family: Gyrinidae
- Subfamily: Heterogyrinae
- Genus: Heterogyrus; Legros, 1953
- Species: H. milloti

Binomial name
- Heterogyrus milloti Legros, 1953

= Heterogyrus =

Heterogyrus milloti

Genus of beetles

Heterogyrus milloti is a species of beetle in the family Gyrinidae, the only species in the genus Heterogyrus. It is endemic to Madagascar.

Within Gyrinidae, the genus Spanglerogyrus is sister to all other taxa; Heterogyrus is, in turn, sister to all gyrinids except Spanglerogyrus, with an estimated divergence 200 million years ago. It is suggested to be closely related to the fossil genera Mesogyrus, Cretotortor and Baissogyrus which constitute the subfamily Heterogyrinae.
