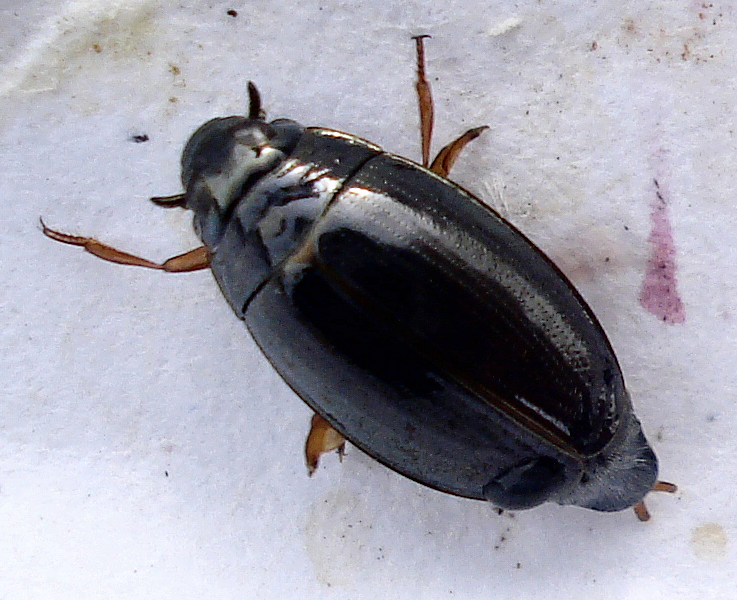

Scientific classification
- Kingdom: Animalia
- Phylum: Arthropoda
- Class: Insecta
- Order: Coleoptera
- Suborder: Adephaga
- Family: Gyrinidae
- Genus: Gyrinus
- Species: G. natator

Binomial name
- Gyrinus natator (Linnaeus, 1758)

= Gyrinus natator =

Species of beetle

Gyrinus natator, the common whirligig beetle, is a species of beetle native to the Palearctic realm, including much of Europe. Its range extends northwards as far as Norway, Finland, and the Saint Petersburg area of Russia. It is an aquatic beetle and moves rapidly around on the surface or swims underwater in still or slow-moving fresh water.

== Description ==
Gyrinus natator is a small oval beetle, about 6 mm (0.24 in) long and 4.5 mm (0.18 in) wide. The highest point of the body is near the middle. The dorsal surface is black with a metallic sheen, and the ventral surface is mainly black, although the epipleura (skirt) can be brown or even reddish. The limbs are reddish or yellowish. There are rows of minute punctures in the elytra, the outer rows being slightly more clearly demarcated than the inner ones. It is very similar in appearance to Gyrinus substriatus and Gyrinus suffriani.

== Distribution and habitat ==
In Europe, this whirligig beetle is found in Austria, Belarus, the Czech Republic, mainland Denmark, Estonia, Finland, mainland France, Spain, Germany, Great Britain including the Isle of Man, the Republic of Ireland, Latvia, Lithuania, mainland Norway, Poland, central and northern Russia, Sweden, Switzerland, the Netherlands, Romania and Ukraine. Its eastern range extends to Siberia and China, but it is relatively uncommon in Western Europe. It is often to be seen on the surface of still or slow-moving streams, ponds and marshes, especially sunny spots with a limited quantity of emergent vegetation.

== Ecology ==
This beetle is gregarious and groups of beetles are often to be seen gyrating rapidly on the surface of the water. It feeds on water fleas and other small invertebrates, and on insects that fall onto the surface of the water. If alarmed it will dive under water and remain submerged for some time. This whirligig beetle can fly, and can often be found in temporary water bodies. The eggs are laid in rows on aquatic plants. The larvae have filament-like breathing tubes projecting on either side of the body and superficially resemble centipedes. When fully developed they climb upwards, pupating on emergent plants, before descending again to the water when they emerge from the pupal case. Breeding takes place in the summer, and the adults hibernate under water during the winter, clinging onto submerged objects.
