= Gyrinus sericeolimbatus =

Scientific classification
- Kingdom: Animalia
- Phylum: Arthropoda
- Class: Insecta
- Order: Coleoptera
- Suborder: Adephaga
- Family: Gyrinidae
- Genus: Gyrinus
- Species: G. sericeolimbatus

Binomial name
- Gyrinus sericeolimbatus Régimbart, 1883

Species of beetle

Gyrinus sericeolimbatus, is a species of whirligig beetle found in India, Sri Lanka, New Guinea, Philippines, Solomon Islands.
