= Gyrinus dubius =

Scientific classification
- Kingdom: Animalia
- Phylum: Arthropoda
- Class: Insecta
- Order: Coleoptera
- Suborder: Adephaga
- Family: Gyrinidae
- Genus: Gyrinus
- Species: G. dubius

Binomial name
- Gyrinus dubius Wallis, 1926

Species of beetle

Gyrinus dubius is a species of whirligig beetle in the family Gyrinidae. It is found in North America.
