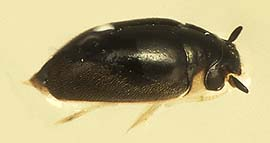

Scientific classification
- Kingdom: Animalia
- Phylum: Arthropoda
- Clade: Pancrustacea
- Class: Insecta
- Order: Coleoptera
- Suborder: Adephaga
- Family: Gyrinidae
- Subfamily: Spanglerogyrinae
- Genus: Spanglerogyrus; Folkerts, 1979
- Species: S. albiventris

Binomial name
- Spanglerogyrus albiventris Folkerts, 1979

= Spanglerogyrus =

Spanglerogyrus albiventris

Genus of beetles

Spanglerogyrus albiventris is a species of beetle in the family Gyrinidae, the only species in the genus Spanglerogyrus. It is native to North America, and was described in 1979 from specimens found in southern Alabama. It is the only living member of the subfamily Spanglerogyrinae, the earliest diverging extant lineage of the gyrinids which also includes Angarogyrus from the Jurassic and Cretaceous of Asia.
