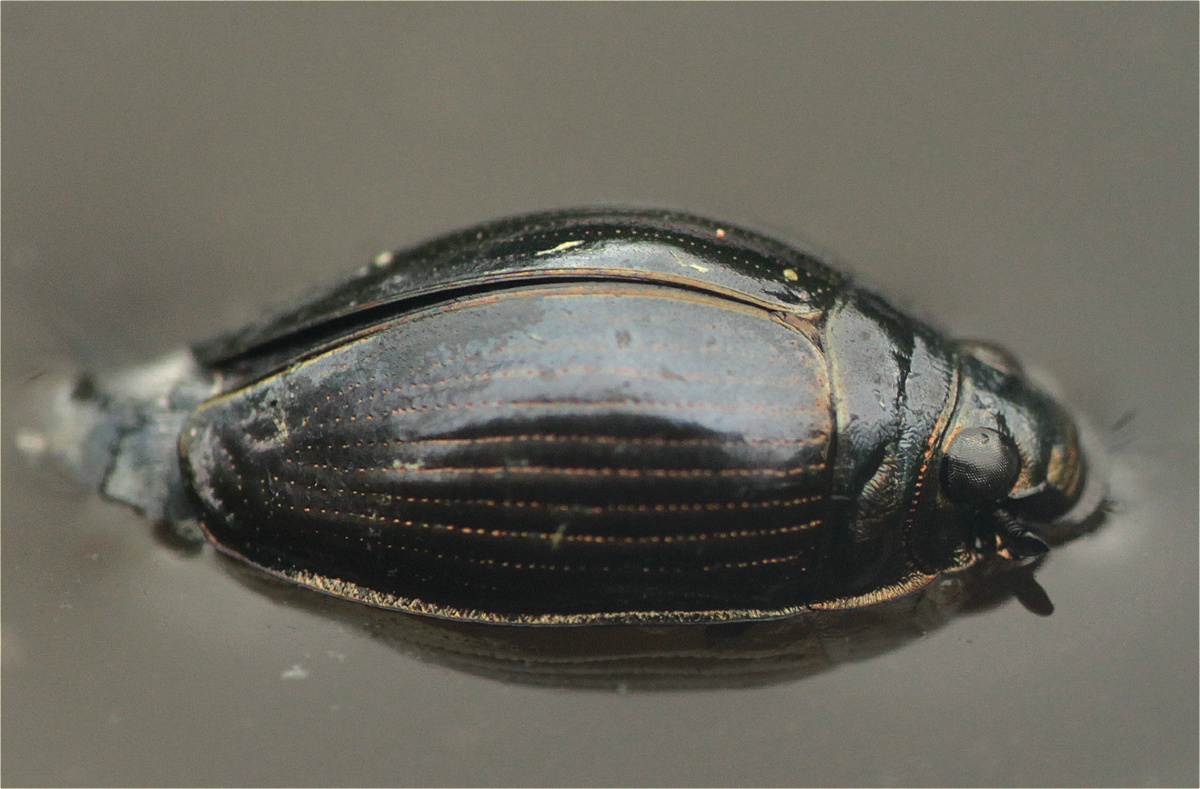
- Gyrinus gibbus from Cuenca

Scientific classification
- Kingdom: Animalia
- Phylum: Arthropoda
- Clade: Pancrustacea
- Class: Insecta
- Order: Coleoptera
- Suborder: Adephaga
- Family: Gyrinidae
- Genus: Gyrinus
- Species: G. gibbus

Binomial name
- Gyrinus gibbus Aubé, 1838

Synonyms
- Gyrinus apicalis Sharp, 1877; Gyrinus hypomelas Ochs, 1955

= Gyrinus gibbus =

Species of beetle

Gyrinus gibbus is a species of aquatic beetle in the family Gyrinidae. It is native to the Neotropics.

== Description ==
The body of Gyrinus gibbus has an oval, convex shape and is between 4.5 mm and 6.0 mm long. It is coloured black or dark brown with exception of the elytral margin, which is often coloured in a reddish or yellow tone. The elytra are non-uniformly reticulated and vary from a polished appearance in the middle regions of the elytra to a bronze-metallic appearance towards the elytral margins. The species shows a high regional variability in body size, convexity, colouration and reticulation of the elytra, with specimens found in the Amazon region being less round and less convex. Like all Gyrinid beetles Gyrinus gibbus has horizontally divided eyes, allowing them to observe the surroundings underwater and on the surface alike. Gyrinus gibbus can be distinguished from the very similar Gyrinus ovatus by the harsher contrast between the polished and metallic areas on the elytra. Furthermore, the elytral apex of Gyrinus gibbus shows a complete border, while in Gyrinus ovatus the epipleural angle bears a spiky denticle.

== Feeding habits ==
Gyrinus gibbus feeds on small insects and spiders that swim or are trapped in the surface film of the water.

== Distribution ==
Gyrinus gibbus is distributed in many parts of Latin America, including Argentina, Bolivia, Brazil, Colombia, Costa Rica, Ecuador, Mexico, Paraguay, Peru, Uruguay, and Venezuela. Gyrinus gibbus prefers stagnant or slow flowing waters. In Venezuela, the species seems to be strongly associated with streams and river habitats where it occurs in the calmer zones of those water bodies.
