= Gyrinus analis =

Scientific classification
- Kingdom: Animalia
- Phylum: Arthropoda
- Class: Insecta
- Order: Coleoptera
- Suborder: Adephaga
- Family: Gyrinidae
- Genus: Gyrinus
- Species: G. analis

Binomial name
- Gyrinus analis Say, 1825

Species of beetle

Gyrinus analis is a species of whirligig beetle in the family Gyrinidae. It is found in North America.
