= Aulonogyrus obliquus =

Scientific classification
- Kingdom: Animalia
- Phylum: Arthropoda
- Class: Insecta
- Order: Coleoptera
- Suborder: Adephaga
- Family: Gyrinidae
- Genus: Aulonogyrus
- Species: A. obliquus

Binomial name
- Aulonogyrus obliquus (Walker, 1858))

Synonyms
- Gyrinus obliquus Walker, 1858

Species of beetle

Aulonogyrus obliquus is a species of beetle native to India, and Sri Lanka.

== Description ==
It is recorded from Eastern Ghats and North Western Himalaya and Silent Valley in Kerala.
