= Orectogyrus =

Scientific classification
- Kingdom: Animalia
- Phylum: Arthropoda
- Class: Insecta
- Order: Coleoptera
- Suborder: Adephaga
- Family: Gyrinidae
- Subfamily: Gyrininae
- Tribe: Orectochilini
- Genus: Orectogyrus; Régimbart, 1884

Genus of beetles

Orectogyrus is a genus of beetles in the family Gyrinidae, containing the following species:

- Orectogyrus albertianus Ochs, 1938
- Orectogyrus alluaudi Régimbart, 1889
- Orectogyrus angularis Régimbart, 1891
- Orectogyrus argenteovittatus Zimmermann, 1920
- Orectogyrus assimilis Régimbart, 1884
- Orectogyrus aureovittatus Brinck, 1956
- Orectogyrus aureus Ochs, 1934
- Orectogyrus baguenai Ochs, 1953
- Orectogyrus barrosmachadoi Brinck, 1951
- Orectogyrus basilewskyi Guignot, 1951
- Orectogyrus bedeli Régimbart, 1884
- Orectogyrus bicostatus (Boheman, 1848)
- Orectogyrus buettikoferi Régimbart, 1887
- Orectogyrus burgeoni Ochs, 1928
- Orectogyrus camerunensis Ochs, 1924
- Orectogyrus capicolus Brinck, 1955
- Orectogyrus centralis Ochs, 1938
- Orectogyrus coerulescens (Dejean, 1836)
- Orectogyrus collarti Ochs, 1937
- Orectogyrus conjugens Régimbart, 1892
- Orectogyrus constrictus Régimbart, 1907
- Orectogyrus convexus Ochs, 1934
- Orectogyrus coptogynus Régimbart, 1906
- Orectogyrus costatus (Aubé, 1838)
- Orectogyrus cuprifer Régimbart, 1884
- Orectogyrus curvipes Ochs, 1947
- Orectogyrus cyanicollis (Dejean, 1836)
- Orectogyrus cyanipterus Guignot, 1947
- Orectogyrus dahomeensis Régimbart, 1907
- Orectogyrus decorsei Régimbart, 1907
- Orectogyrus dedalus Guignot, 1952
- Orectogyrus demeryi Régimbart, 1891
- Orectogyrus dimidiatus (Laporte de Castelnau, 1835)
- Orectogyrus discors Régimbart, 1891
- Orectogyrus dorsiger Régimbart, 1884
- Orectogyrus dunkeli Ochs, 1934
- Orectogyrus elongatus Régimbart, 1886
- Orectogyrus endroedyi Ochs, 1967
- Orectogyrus erosus Régimbart, 1906
- Orectogyrus escherichi Ochs, 1924
- Orectogyrus eversor Brinck, 1956
- Orectogyrus familiaris Ochs, 1947
- Orectogyrus favareli Guignot, 1942
- Orectogyrus feminalis Régimbart, 1906
- Orectogyrus ferranti Ochs, 1928
- Orectogyrus fluviatilis Régimbart, 1907
- Orectogyrus formosus Ochs, 1928
- Orectogyrus furcatus Ochs, 1934
- Orectogyrus fusciventris Régimbart, 1895
- Orectogyrus gigas Ochs, 1934
- Orectogyrus glaucus Klug in Ehrenberg, 1834
- Orectogyrus grandis Régimbart, 1892
- Orectogyrus grisescens Fairmaire, 1899
- Orectogyrus guignoti Ochs, 1947
- Orectogyrus hancocki Ochs, 1934
- Orectogyrus hastatus Régimbart, 1892
- Orectogyrus hawashensis Omer-Cooper, 1930
- Orectogyrus heros Régimbart, 1884
- Orectogyrus imitans Ochs, 1928
- Orectogyrus interstitialis Ochs, 1938
- Orectogyrus jucundus Régimbart, 1892
- Orectogyrus kasikiensis Ochs, 1938
- Orectogyrus kaszabi Ochs, 1967
- Orectogyrus kelleni Régimbart, 1889
- Orectogyrus kutteri Ochs, 1967
- Orectogyrus lanceolatus Régimbart, 1884
- Orectogyrus laticostis Régimbart, 1906
- Orectogyrus latiusculus Ochs, 1938
- Orectogyrus leroyi Régimbart, 1886
- Orectogyrus lionotus Régimbart, 1884
- Orectogyrus longilabris Régimbart, 1895
- Orectogyrus longitaris Régimbart, 1884
- Orectogyrus luayensis Ochs, 1937
- Orectogyrus lujai Ochs, 1928
- Orectogyrus lunai Brinck, 1958
- Orectogyrus luteolus Ochs, 1938
- Orectogyrus madagascariensis (Dejean, 1836)
- Orectogyrus manensis Guignot, 1938
- Orectogyrus masculinus Régimbart, 1902
- Orectogyrus mesochlorus Guignot, 1952
- Orectogyrus milliaui Ochs, 1937
- Orectogyrus mirabilis Régimbart, 1884
- Orectogyrus mocquerysi Régimbart, 1892
- Orectogyrus monardi Guignot, 1941
- Orectogyrus nairobiensis Régimbart, 1907
- Orectogyrus nanus Ochs, 1934
- Orectogyrus neumanni Ochs, 1934
- Orectogyrus noctuabundus Brinck, 1951
- Orectogyrus oberthueri Régimbart, 1884
- Orectogyrus obscurus Ochs, 1947
- Orectogyrus ochsi Guignot, 1938
- Orectogyrus orectochilinus Ochs, 1925
- Orectogyrus orientalis Régimbart, 1907
- Orectogyrus ornaticollis Aubé, 1838
- Orectogyrus oscari Apetz, 1854
- Orectogyrus oscaris Régimbart, 1884
- Orectogyrus overlaeti Ochs, 1934
- Orectogyrus pallidiventris Ochs, 1934
- Orectogyrus pallidocinctus (Fairmaire, 1880)
- Orectogyrus pamelae Brinck, 1960
- Orectogyrus paradoxus Ochs, 1928
- Orectogyrus patromimus Ochs, 1929
- Orectogyrus peridines Guignot, 1955
- Orectogyrus perrieri Fairmaire, 1899
- Orectogyrus petrinus Brinck, 1960
- Orectogyrus pictimanus Régimbart, 1892
- Orectogyrus polli Régimbart, 1884
- Orectogyrus posticalis Ochs, 1930
- Orectogyrus potamophilus Guignot, 1955
- Orectogyrus probus Brinck, 1956
- Orectogyrus prolongatus Régimbart, 1892
- Orectogyrus pulcherrimus Zimmermann, 1916
- Orectogyrus purpureus Régimbart, 1892
- Orectogyrus rhodesianus Ochs, 1933
- Orectogyrus riggenbachi Ochs, 1934
- Orectogyrus robustus Ochs, 1925
- Orectogyrus rotundatus Ochs, 1934
- Orectogyrus rugulifer Régimbart, 1906
- Orectogyrus rugulosus Régimbart, 1907
- Orectogyrus rustibus Brinck, 1956
- Orectogyrus ruwenzoricus Alwarth, 1921
- Orectogyrus schistaceus (Gerstaecker, 1866)
- Orectogyrus schoenherri (Dejean, 1833)
- Orectogyrus schubotzi Alwarth, 1921
- Orectogyrus schultzei Zimmermann, 1920
- Orectogyrus semisericeus Gestro, 1881
- Orectogyrus semivillosus (Dejean, 1821)
- Orectogyrus sericeus (Klug in Ehrenberg, 1834)
- Orectogyrus sexualis Régimbart, 1891
- Orectogyrus simulans Ochs, 1928
- Orectogyrus sjoestedti Régimbart, 1902
- Orectogyrus socius Ochs, 1943
- Orectogyrus specularis (Dejean, 1833)
- Orectogyrus speculum (Aubé, 1838)
- Orectogyrus spinifer Franciscolo, 1986
- Orectogyrus strigicollis Guignot, 1952
- Orectogyrus subseriatus Régimbart, 1886
- Orectogyrus tavetensis Régimbart, 1906
- Orectogyrus trilobatus Régimbart, 1884
- Orectogyrus uellensis Ochs, 1928
- Orectogyrus vagus Guignot, 1938
- Orectogyrus vanstraeleni Ochs, 1938
- Orectogyrus vedyi Ochs, 1937
- Orectogyrus venustulus Ochs, 1933
- Orectogyrus vermiculatus Ochs, 1952
- Orectogyrus vestitus Régimbart, 1892
- Orectogyrus vicinus Régimbart, 1892
- Orectogyrus virescens Guignot, 1953
- Orectogyrus walterrossii Franciscolo & Sanfilippo, 1986
- Orectogyrus witteanus Ochs, 1938
- Orectogyrus zimmermanni Ochs, 1925
