= Gyrinus affinis =

Scientific classification
- Kingdom: Animalia
- Phylum: Arthropoda
- Class: Insecta
- Order: Coleoptera
- Suborder: Adephaga
- Family: Gyrinidae
- Genus: Gyrinus
- Species: G. affinis

Binomial name
- Gyrinus affinis Aubé, 1838

Species of beetle

Gyrinus affinis is a species of whirligig beetle in the family Gyrinidae. It is found in North America.
