= Macrogyrus =

Scientific classification
- Kingdom: Animalia
- Phylum: Arthropoda
- Class: Insecta
- Order: Coleoptera
- Suborder: Adephaga
- Family: Gyrinidae
- Subfamily: Gyrininae
- Tribe: Dineutini
- Genus: Macrogyrus; Régimbart, 1882

Subgenera
- Andogyrus; Cyclomimus; Macrogyrus sensu stricto

Genus of beetles

Macrogyrus is a genus of beetles in the family Gyrinidae, containing the following species:

- Macrogyrus aenescens (Régimbart, 1882)
- Macrogyrus albertisi (Régimbart, 1882)
- Macrogyrus angustatus Régimbart, 1883
- Macrogyrus australis (Brullé, 1835)
- Macrogyrus blanchardi Régimbart, 1883
- Macrogyrus caledonicus (Fauvel, 1867)
- Macrogyrus canaliculatus Frogatt, 1907
- Macrogyrus convexus Ochs, 1937
- Macrogyrus darlingtoni Ochs, 1949
- Macrogyrus elongatus Régimbart, 1883
- Macrogyrus finschi Ochs, 1925
- Macrogyrus gibbosus Ochs, 1956
- Macrogyrus gouldii (Hope, 1842)
- Macrogyrus heurni Ochs, 1955
- Macrogyrus howittii (Clark, 1864)
- Macrogyrus latior Tillyard, 1926
- Macrogyrus leechi Mouchamps, 1951
- Macrogyrus leopoldi Ball, 1932
- Macrogyrus loriai Ochs, 1955
- Macrogyrus oberthueri Régimbart, 1883
- Macrogyrus obliquatus (Aubé, 1838)
- Macrogyrus oblongus (Boisduval, 1835)
- Macrogyrus obsoletus Régimbart, 1907
- Macrogyrus oratus
- Macrogyrus orthocolobus Heller, 1914
- Macrogyrus ovatus Ochs, 1934
- Macrogyrus paradoxus Régimbart, 1883
- Macrogyrus purpurascens Régimbart, 1883
- Macrogyrus reichei (Aubé, 1838)
- Macrogyrus reticulatus Régimbart, 1899
- Macrogyrus rivularis (Clark, 1863)
- Macrogyrus sexangularis Régimbart, 1907
- Macrogyrus striolatus (Guérin-Meneville, 1830)
- Macrogyrus sumbawae (Régimbart, 1882)
- Macrogyrus toxopeusi Ochs, 1955
- Macrogyrus variegatus Régimbart, 1907
- Macrogyrus venator (Dejean, 1833)
- Macrogyrus viridisulcatus Mjöberg, 1916
- Macrogyrus wetarensis Ochs, 1953
