= Gyrinus aeneiceps =

Scientific classification
- Kingdom: Animalia
- Phylum: Arthropoda
- Class: Insecta
- Order: Coleoptera
- Suborder: Adephaga
- Family: Gyrinidae
- Genus: Gyrinus
- Species: G. aeneiceps

Binomial name
- Gyrinus aeneiceps Sturm, 1843

Species of beetle

Gyrinus aeneiceps is a species of beetle from the Gyrinidae family. The scientific name of this species was first published in 1843 by Sturm.
