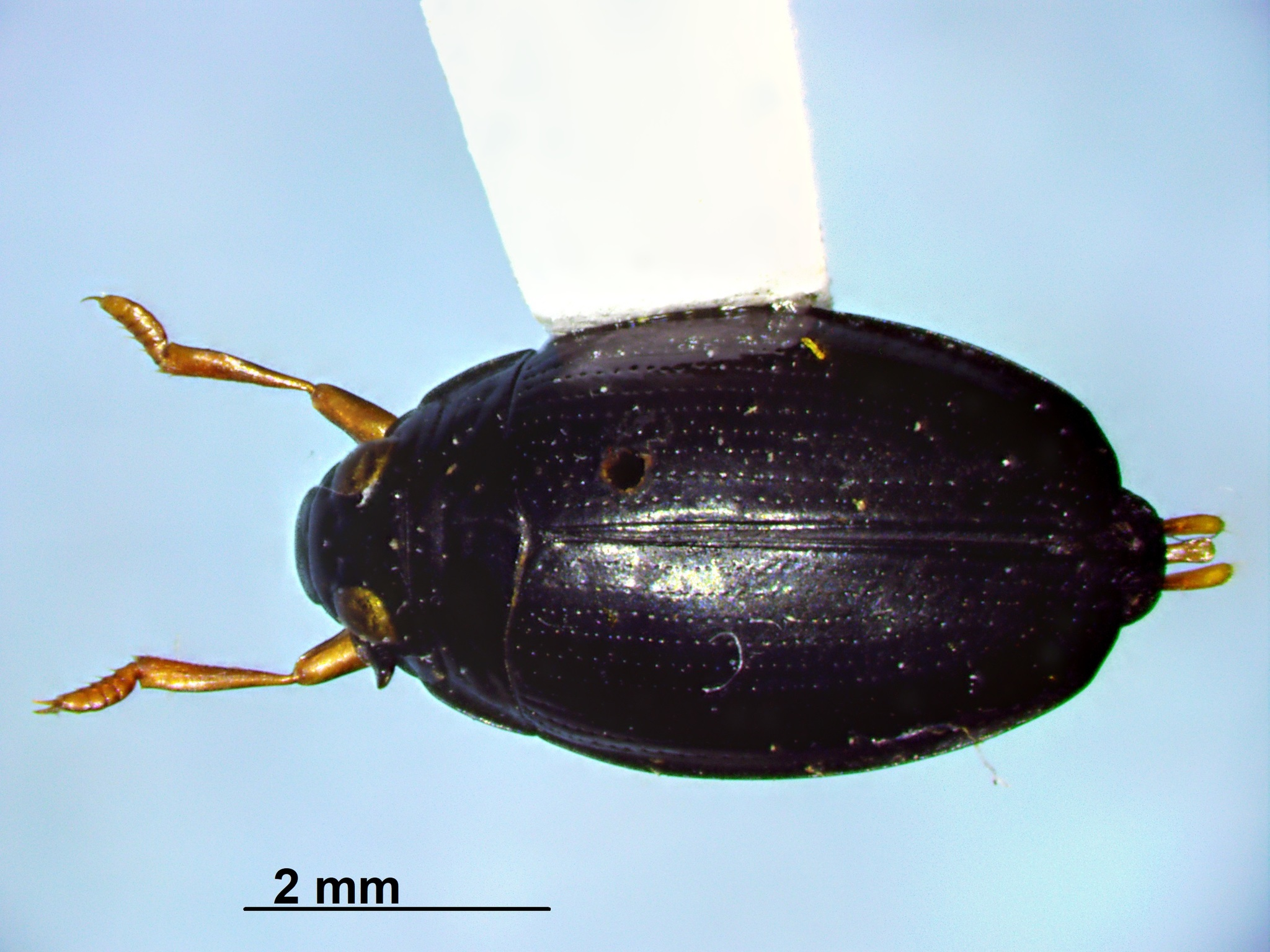

Scientific classification
- Kingdom: Animalia
- Phylum: Arthropoda
- Class: Insecta
- Order: Coleoptera
- Suborder: Adephaga
- Family: Gyrinidae
- Genus: Gyrinus
- Species: G. gibber

Binomial name
- Gyrinus gibber LeConte, 1868

Synonyms
- Gyrinus floridensis Ochs, 1929; Gyrinus frosti Fall, 1922

= Gyrinus gibber =

Species of beetle

Gyrinus gibber is a species of whirligig beetle in the family Gyrinidae. It is found in North America.
