= Gyrinus distinctus =

Scientific classification
- Kingdom: Animalia
- Phylum: Arthropoda
- Class: Insecta
- Order: Coleoptera
- Suborder: Adephaga
- Family: Gyrinidae
- Genus: Gyrinus
- Species: G. distinctus

Binomial name
- Gyrinus distinctus Aubé, 1836

Species of beetle

Gyrinus distinctus is a species of beetles belonging to the family Gyrinidae.

It is native to Europe.
