= Gyrinus cavatus =

Scientific classification
- Kingdom: Animalia
- Phylum: Arthropoda
- Class: Insecta
- Order: Coleoptera
- Suborder: Adephaga
- Family: Gyrinidae
- Genus: Gyrinus
- Species: G. cavatus

Binomial name
- Gyrinus cavatus Atton, 1990

Species of beetle

Gyrinus cavatus is a species of whirligig beetle in the family Gyrinidae. It is found in North America.
