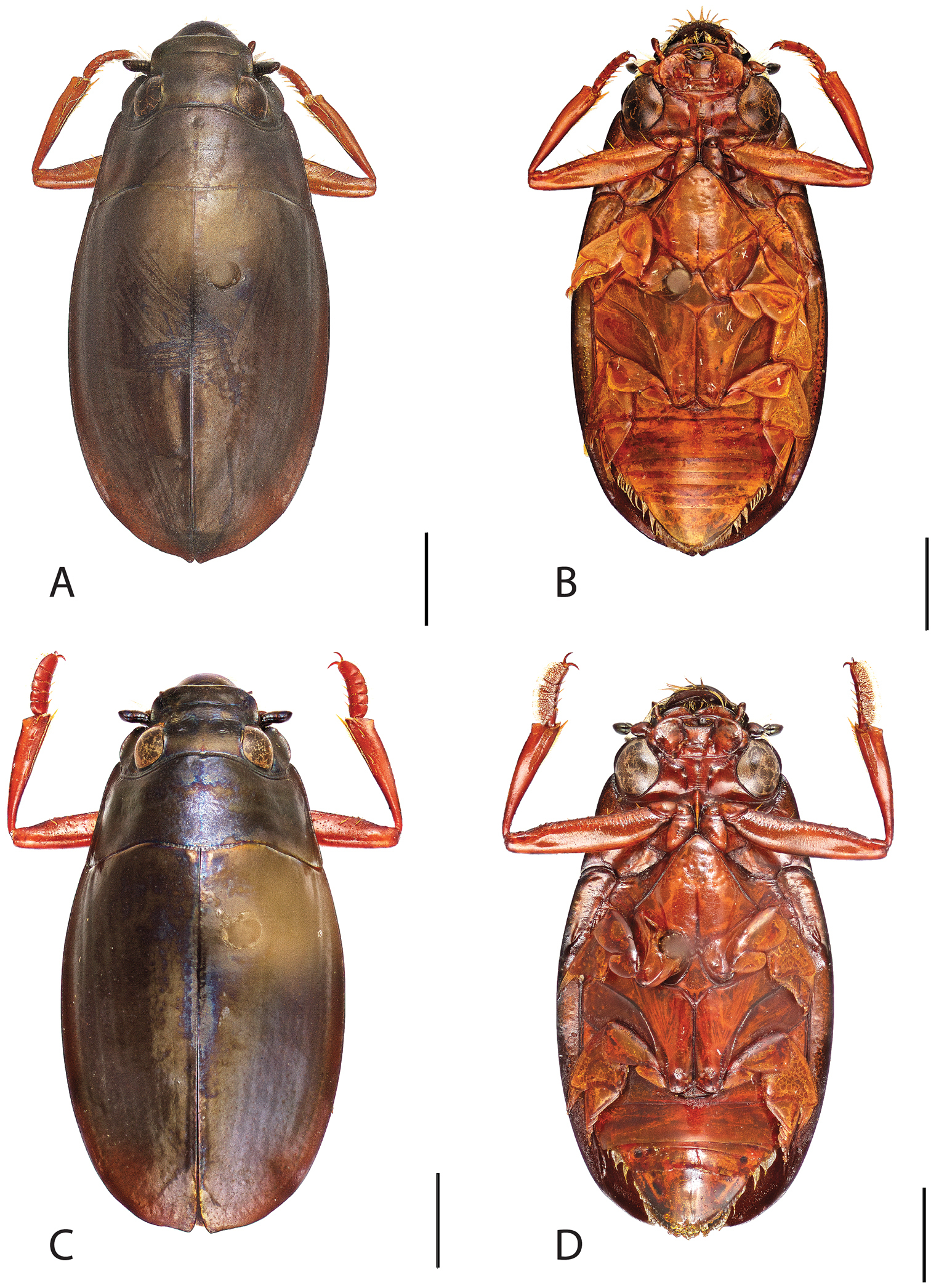
- Dineutus angustus

Scientific classification
- Kingdom: Animalia
- Phylum: Arthropoda
- Class: Insecta
- Order: Coleoptera
- Suborder: Adephaga
- Family: Gyrinidae
- Subfamily: Gyrininae; Latreille, 1810

= Gyrininae =

Subfamily of beetles

Gyrininae is a subfamily of ground and water beetles in the family Gyrinidae. There are at least 740 described extant species in Gyrininae.

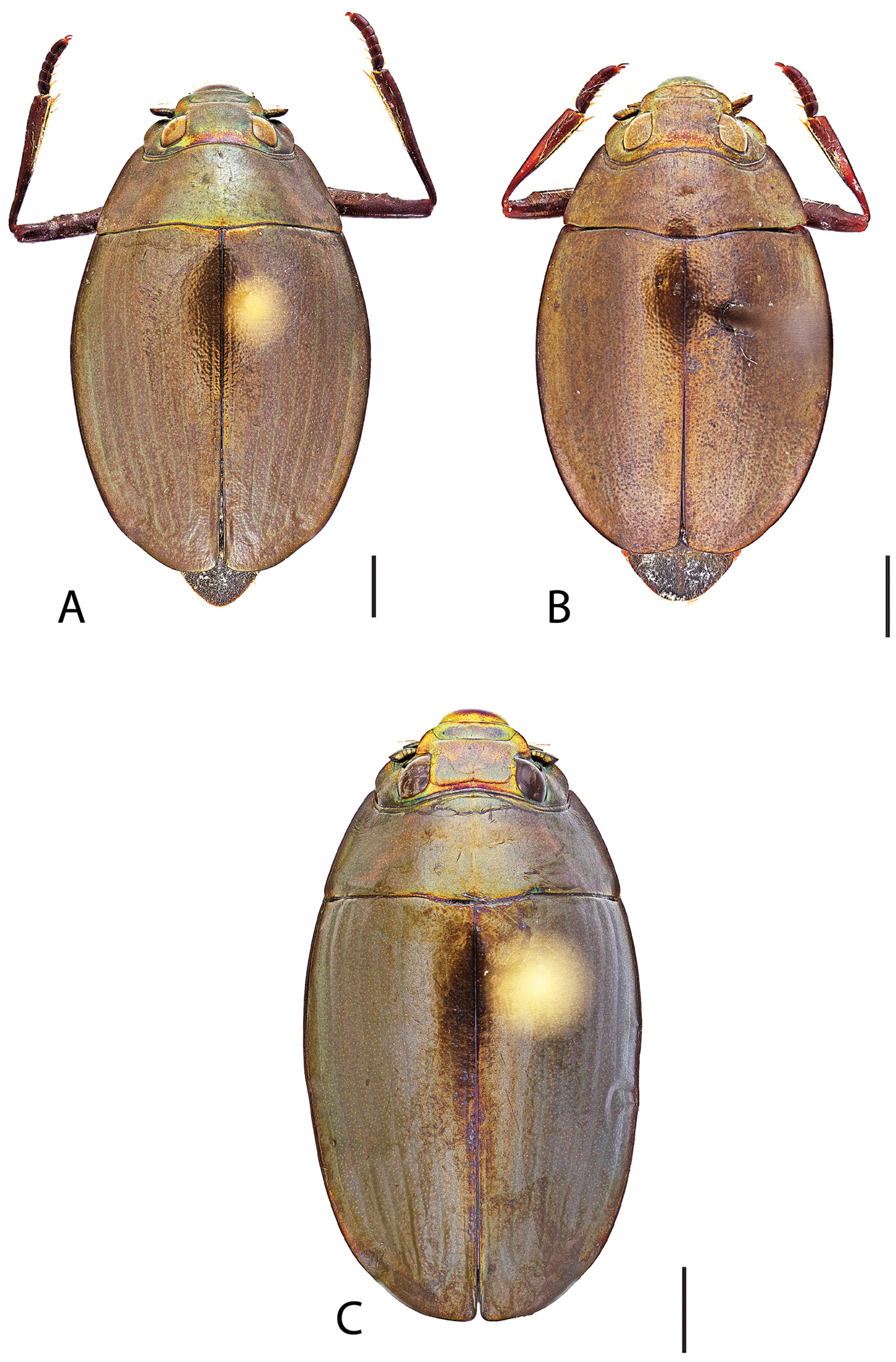
Dineutus sublineatus

== Genera ==
Taxonomy after

- Dineutini Desmarest, 1851
  - †Cretodineutus Liang et al., 2020 - Burmese amber, Late Cretaceous (Cenomanian)
  - †Cretogyrus Zhao et al., 2019 - Burmese amber, Cenomanian
  - Dineutus MacLeay, 1825
  - Enhydrus Laporte, 1835
  - Macrogyrus Régimbart, 1882 (including Andogyrus Ochs, 1924)
  - †Mesodineutes Ponomarenko, 1977 - Darmakan Formation, Russia, Danian
  - †Miodineutes Hatch, 1927 - Germany, Miocene
  - Porrorhynchus Laporte, 1835
- Gyrinini Latreille, 1810
  - Aulonogyrus Motchulsky, 1853
  - †Gyrinoides Motchulsky, 1856
  - Gyrinus Geoffroy, 1762
  - Metagyrinus Brinck, 1955
- Orectochilini Régimbart, 1882
  - Gyretes Brullé, 1835
  - Orectochilus Dejean, 1833
  - Orectogyrus Régimbart, 1884
  - Patrus Aubé, 1836
- †Chimerogyrus Gustafson, Michat & Balke, 2020 - Burmese amber, Cenomanian
