= Enhydrus =

Scientific classification
- Kingdom: Animalia
- Phylum: Arthropoda
- Clade: Pancrustacea
- Class: Insecta
- Order: Coleoptera
- Suborder: Adephaga
- Family: Gyrinidae
- Subfamily: Gyrininae
- Tribe: Dineutini
- Genus: Enhydrus; Laporte, 1835

Type species
- Gyrinus sulcatus Wiedemann, 1821

Synonyms
- Epinectus Dejean, 1833 (nomen nudum); Epinectus Aubé, 1836; Epinectes Régimbart, 1877 (unjustified emendation); Prothydrus Guignot, 1954

Genus of beetles

Enhydrus is a genus of beetles in the family Gyrinidae, containing the following species:

- Enhydrus atratus Régimbart, 1877
- Enhydrus mirandus Ochs, 1955
- Enhydrus sulcatus (Wiedemann, 1821)
- Enhydrus tibialis Régimbart, 1877
