= Gyrinus borealis =

Scientific classification
- Kingdom: Animalia
- Phylum: Arthropoda
- Class: Insecta
- Order: Coleoptera
- Suborder: Adephaga
- Family: Gyrinidae
- Genus: Gyrinus
- Species: G. borealis

Binomial name
- Gyrinus borealis Dejean, 1833

Species of beetle

Gyrinus borealis is a species of beetle from the Gyrinidae family. The scientific name of this species was first published in 1833 by Dejean.
