= Gyretes iricolor =

Scientific classification
- Kingdom: Animalia
- Phylum: Arthropoda
- Class: Insecta
- Order: Coleoptera
- Suborder: Adephaga
- Family: Gyrinidae
- Genus: Gyretes
- Species: G. iricolor

Binomial name
- Gyretes iricolor Young, 1947

Species of beetle

Gyretes iricolor is a species of whirligig beetle in the family Gyrinidae. It is found in North America.
