= Gyrinus pachysomus =

Scientific classification
- Kingdom: Animalia
- Phylum: Arthropoda
- Class: Insecta
- Order: Coleoptera
- Suborder: Adephaga
- Family: Gyrinidae
- Genus: Gyrinus
- Species: G. pachysomus

Binomial name
- Gyrinus pachysomus Fall, 1922

Species of beetle

Gyrinus pachysomus is a species of whirligig beetle in the family Gyrinidae. It is found in North America.
