= M. amurensis =

M. amurensis may refer to:

- Maackia amurensis, the Amur maackia, a tree species
- Mandschurosaurus amurensis, a dinosaur species
- Meoneura amurensis a fly species in the genus Meoneura
- Mesodineutes amurensis, an extinct beetle species
- Mordellistena amurensis, a beetle species

== See also ==
- List of Latin and Greek words commonly used in systematic names#Amurensis
