= Gyrinus dichrous =

Scientific classification
- Kingdom: Animalia
- Phylum: Arthropoda
- Class: Insecta
- Order: Coleoptera
- Suborder: Adephaga
- Family: Gyrinidae
- Genus: Gyrinus
- Species: G. dichrous

Binomial name
- Gyrinus dichrous LeConte, 1868

Species of beetle

Gyrinus dichrous is a species of whirligig beetle in the family Gyrinidae. It is found in North America.
