= Gyrinus maculiventris =

Scientific classification
- Kingdom: Animalia
- Phylum: Arthropoda
- Class: Insecta
- Order: Coleoptera
- Suborder: Adephaga
- Family: Gyrinidae
- Genus: Gyrinus
- Species: G. maculiventris

Binomial name
- Gyrinus maculiventris LeConte, 1868

Species of beetle

Gyrinus maculiventris is a species of whirligig beetle in the family Gyrinidae. It is found in North America.
