= Gyrinus ventralis =

Scientific classification
- Kingdom: Animalia
- Phylum: Arthropoda
- Class: Insecta
- Order: Coleoptera
- Suborder: Adephaga
- Family: Gyrinidae
- Genus: Gyrinus
- Species: G. ventralis

Binomial name
- Gyrinus ventralis Kirby, 1837

Species of beetle

Gyrinus ventralis is a species of beetles from the Gyrinidae family. The scientific name of this species was first published in Kirby.
