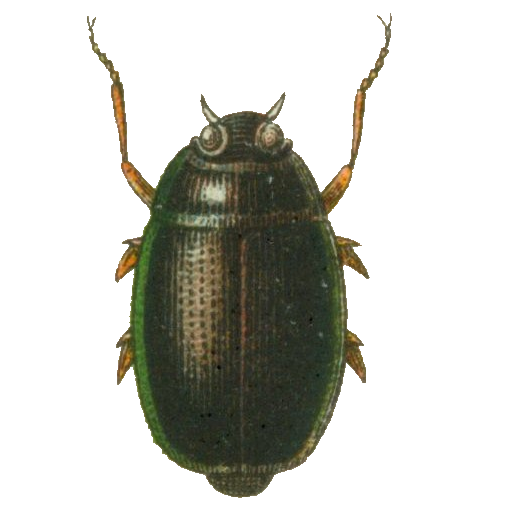

Scientific classification
- Kingdom: Animalia
- Phylum: Arthropoda
- Class: Insecta
- Order: Coleoptera
- Suborder: Adephaga
- Family: Gyrinidae
- Genus: Gyrinus
- Species: G. marinus

Binomial name
- Gyrinus marinus Gyllenhaal, 1808

= Gyrinus marinus =

Species of beetle

Gyrinus marinus is a species of beetle native to the Palearctic, including Europe. In Europe, it is only found in Austria, Belarus, Belgium, Bosnia and Herzegovina, Croatia, the Czech Republic, mainland Denmark, Estonia, Finland, mainland France, Germany, mainland Italy, Latvia, mainland Norway, Poland, Russia, Slovakia, Sweden, Switzerland, the Netherlands, Ukraine and Yugoslavia.
