= Porrorhynchus indicans =

Scientific classification
- Kingdom: Animalia
- Phylum: Arthropoda
- Class: Insecta
- Order: Coleoptera
- Suborder: Adephaga
- Family: Gyrinidae
- Genus: Porrorhynchus
- Species: P. indicans

Binomial name
- Porrorhynchus indicans (Walker, 1858)

Synonyms
- Dineutes indicans Walker 1858; Porrhorhynchus brevirostris Régimbart 1877; Porrhorrhynchus indicans Régimbart 1886; Dineutus (Porrorhynchus) indicans Ochs 1926; Porrorhynchus (Ceylorhynchus) indicans Brinck, 1955; Porrorhynchus indicans Vazirani 1969

Species of beetle

Porrorhynchus indicans, is a species of whirligig beetle found in Sri Lanka.

== Description ==
Length of male is 16.6 to 19.2 mm whereas female is 15.1 to 17.0 mm.
