= Gyrinus parcus =

Scientific classification
- Kingdom: Animalia
- Phylum: Arthropoda
- Class: Insecta
- Order: Coleoptera
- Suborder: Adephaga
- Family: Gyrinidae
- Genus: Gyrinus
- Species: G. parcus

Binomial name
- Gyrinus parcus Say, 1834

Species of beetle

Gyrinus parcus is a species of whirligig beetle in the family Gyrinidae. It is found in Central America, North America, and South America.

== Subspecies ==
These six subspecies belong to the species Gyrinus parcus:

- Gyrinus parcus agnatus Ochs, 1949
- Gyrinus parcus californicus Ochs, 1949
- Gyrinus parcus cognatus Ochs, 1949
- Gyrinus parcus elatus Ochs, 1949
- Gyrinus parcus fa
- Gyrinus parcus parcus Say, 1834
