= Porrorhynchus =

Scientific classification
- Kingdom: Animalia
- Phylum: Arthropoda
- Class: Insecta
- Order: Coleoptera
- Suborder: Adephaga
- Family: Gyrinidae
- Subfamily: Gyrininae
- Tribe: Dineutini
- Genus: Porrorhynchus; Laporte, 1835

Type species
- Porrorhynchus marginatus Laporte, 1835

Synonyms
- Ceylorhynchus Brinck, 1955

Genus of beetles

Porrorhynchus is a genus of beetles in the family Gyrinidae, containing the following species:

- Porrorhynchus indicans (Walker, 1858)
- Porrorhynchus landaisi Régimbart, 1892
- Porrorhynchus marginatus Laporte, 1835

The subgenus Rhomborhynchus Ochs, 1926, containing the species Porrorhynchus depressus Régimbart, 1892 and Porrorhynchus misoolensis (Ochs, 1955), was tenatively transferred to Dineutus in 2017.
