= Georg Hermann Alexander Ochs =

German entomologist (1887-1971)

Georg Hermann Alexander Ochs (11 July 1887 – 27 September 1971) was a German entomologist, specialising in Coleoptera and in particular the Gyrinidae. In this group he worked on the world fauna.

== Works ==
Partial list

- Über Papuanische Gyrinidae. Senckenbergiana 7: 172-177 (1925).
- Die Dineutini. 2 Tribus der unterfam. Enhydrinae, Fam. Gyrinidae. Entomol. Z. 40: 61-74, 112-126, 129-140, 190-197 (1926).
- Über einige neue und bemerkenswerte Gyriniden, vorzüglich aus dem Dresdener Museum. Entomol. Bl. Biol. Syst. Kaefer 25: 197-200 (1929).
- Nachtrag zur Gyriniden-Fauna von Belgisch Congo (1930).
- Über einige neue und bemerkenswerte Gyriniden (Coleoptera) im Zoologischen Museum der Akademie der Wissenschaften (1930).
- Catalogue of Indian Insects. Pt. 19 - Gyrinoidae. Calcutta : Govt. of India, Central Publication Branch ii 39 pp. (1930).
- Über einige neue und bemerkenswerte Gyriniden, vorzüglich aud dem Dresdener Museum. Entomol. Bl. Biol. Syst. Kaefer 26: 14-18 (1930).
- Über die Gyriniden-Ausbeute der Deutschen Limnologischen Sunda-Expedition mit einer Übersicht über die Gyriniden-Fauna Javas und Larvenbeschreibungen (1931)
- Ergänzende Bemerkungen zur Gyriniden-Fauna Borneos (1932)
- Ein weiterer Beitrag zur Kenntnis der neotropischen Gyriniden (1935).
- Nachtrag zur Gyriniden-Fauna Javas und der benachbarten Sunda-Inseln nebst Beschreibung einiger Verwandten des Orectochilus spiniger Rég. aus Hinter-Indien und Ceylon (1937).
- Results of the Oxford University expedition to Sarawak (Borneo), 1932. Gyriniden (Coleoptera) (1937).
- Über neue und interessante Gyriniden aus Afrika (1937).
- Additional remarks on West Indian Gyrinidae (1938).
- Ergänzende Mitteilungen zur Kenntnis der Gyriniden-Fauna der grossen Sunda-Inseln(1940)
- A revision of the Australian Gyrinidae. Rec. Aust. Mus. 22: 171-199 (1949).
- Die Sunda-Gyriniden des Museum Zoologicum Bogoriense (Col., Gyrinidae) (1953)
- Über die Gyriniden der Sumba-Expedition 1949 (1953).
- Über die von Dr. J. Bechyně in Französisch Guinea gesammelten Gyriniden (Col.) (1954)
- Results of the Archbold Expeditions. Die Gyriniden-fauna von Neuguinea nach dem erzeitigen Stand unserer Kenntnisse (Coleoptera, Gyrinidae) (1955). *Zur Gyriniden-Fauna des Iran 1954 und 1956 (Coleopt.) (1957).
- Über neue und interessante Gyriniden aus dem Amazonas-Gebiet nebst einer Überarbeitung der Artengruppe um Gyretes nitidulus (Ins. Col.) (1958).
- Über die Gyriniden (Col.) von Guiana (1963)
- Unerwartetes Vorkommen von Taumelkäfern (Gyrinidae) auf Curaçao (1963).
- Gyrinidae (Col.) von Neukaledonien (1968)
- Zur Ethökologie der Taumelkäfer (Col., Gyrionoidea) (1969).
- Note sur le Chrysobarabus solieri Dejean et ses sous-especes (1965).
- Note sur quelques coleopteres carabiques du sud-est de la France description de 4 sous-especes nouvelles (1965).
- Description de deux nouvelles sous-espéces de Carabes (1966)

== Collections ==
Ochs collections of Carabidae, Staphylinidae and Cerambycidae and general collections from Central Europe are in Senckenberg Museum, Frankfurt am Main as is his world collection of Gyrinidae.A local collection of beetles is in Göttingen museum.

== Beetles described by Ochs ==
- Metagyrinus sinensis Coleoptera: Gyrinidae (1924)
- Gyrinus paykulli Coleoptera: Gyrinidae (1927) named for Gustaf von Paykull
- Duvalius ochsi ssp. deserticola Coleoptera: Carabidae described with René Jeannel
