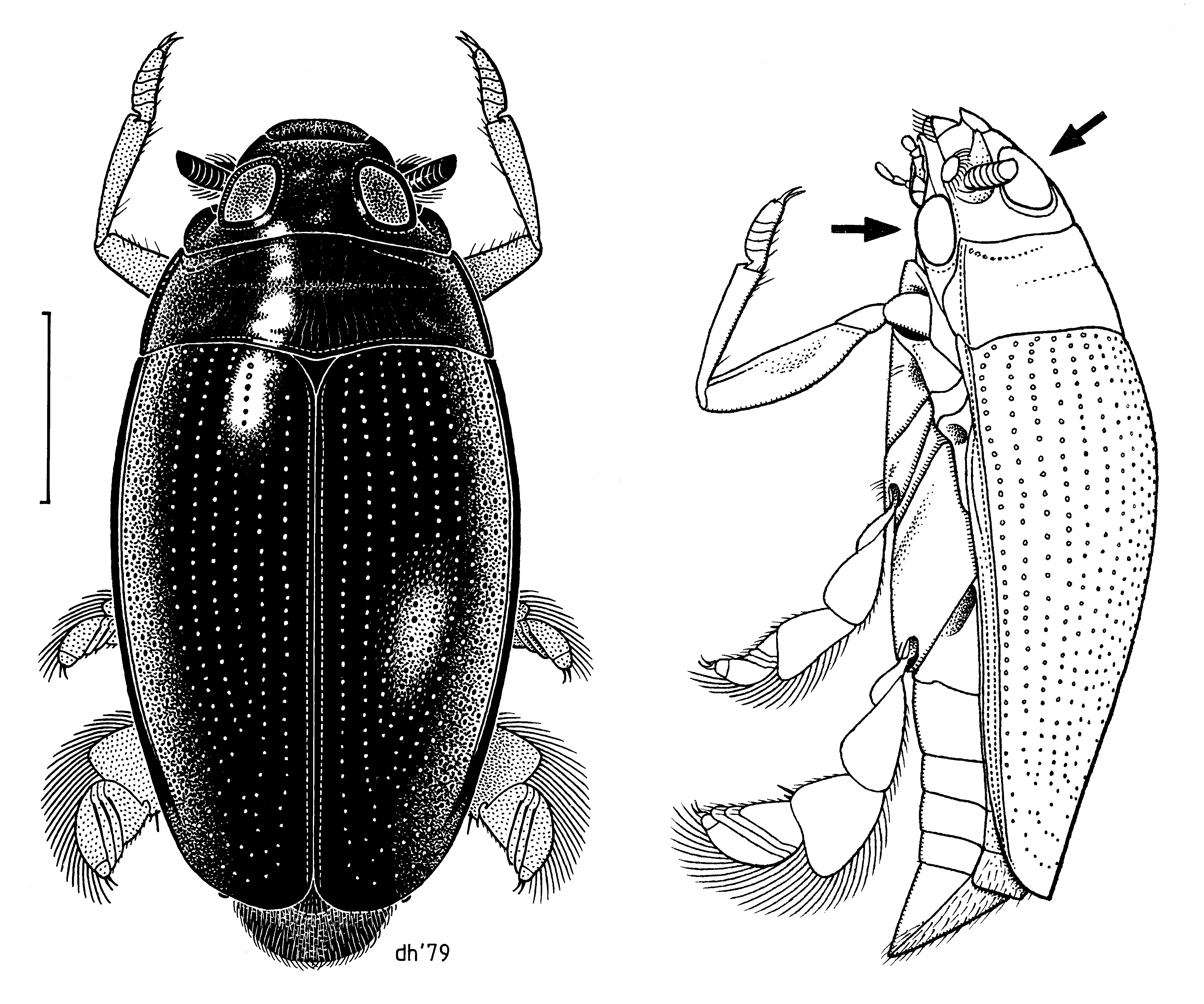
- Gyrinus convexiusculus illustration by Des Helmore.

Scientific classification
- Kingdom: Animalia
- Phylum: Arthropoda
- Class: Insecta
- Order: Coleoptera
- Suborder: Adephaga
- Family: Gyrinidae
- Genus: Gyrinus
- Species: G. convexiusculus

Binomial name
- Gyrinus convexiusculus Macleay, 1871

Synonyms
- Gyrinus huttoni Pascoe, 1877

= Gyrinus convexiusculus =

Species of beetle

Gyrinus convexiusculus is a species of whirligig beetle in the family Gyrinidae, first described by Macleay in 1871.

== Description ==
The species is 3.5–4.8 mm long, and is the smallest Australian whirligig beetle. It has a black body. Gyrinus convexiusculus found in New Zealand are consistently larger than Australian specimens (averaging 4.4mm for males and 4.6mm for females).

== Distribution and habitat ==
Gyrinus convexiusculus is found across the eastern coast of Australia, ranging from Darwin to Victoria but most commonly found around Brisbane. The species has been recorded in South Asia, China, Indonesia, New Zealand and New Caledonia. Initially being recorded in New Zealand in the 1870s, no record of the species was found for 100 years, until their rediscovery in the Waikato in 1977, and later in Northland (Mangonui in 1983 and Marsden Point in 1989). It is the sole whirligig beetle species found in New Zealand, and it is unknown if the populations found in New Zealand represent an enduring population, or populations that recently self-introduced from Australia.

The species is found in shallow fresh water bodies, small peat lakes and man-made dams.
