= Chimerogyrus =

Chimerogyrus Temporal range: Cenomanian

Scientific classification
- Kingdom: Animalia
- Phylum: Arthropoda
- Clade: Pancrustacea
- Class: Insecta
- Order: Coleoptera
- Suborder: Adephaga
- Family: Gyrinidae
- Subfamily: Gyrininae
- Genus: †Chimerogyrus; Gustafson, Michat & Balke, 2020
- Species: †C. gigagalea

Binomial name
- †Chimerogyrus gigagalea Gustafson, Michat & Balke, 2020

Genus of beetles

Chimerogyrus gigagalea is a fossil species of beetle in the family Gyrinidae, the only known species in the genus Chimerogyrus. It is known from a larval form found in Cenomanian aged Burmese amber of Myanmar. It was found to be a member of Gyrininae, sister to Dineutini + Orectochilini.
