= Gyrinopsis =

Scientific classification
- Kingdom: Animalia
- Phylum: Arthropoda
- Class: Insecta
- Order: Coleoptera
- Suborder: Adephaga
- Family: Gyrinidae
- Genus: †Gyrinopsis; Handlirsch, 1906
- Species: †G. antiquus

Binomial name
- †Gyrinopsis antiquus (Heer, 1864)

Genus of beetles

Gyrinopsis antiquus is an extinct species of fossil beetle in the family Gyrinidae, the only species in the genus Gyrinopsis.
