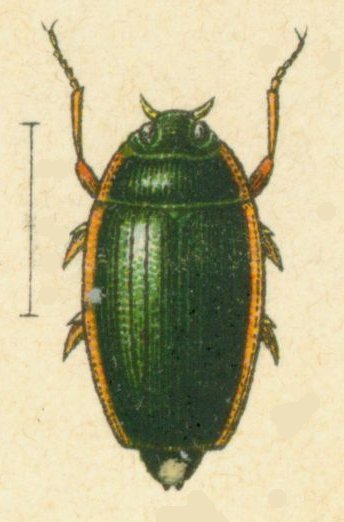
- Aulonogyrus striatus

Scientific classification
- Kingdom: Animalia
- Phylum: Arthropoda
- Class: Insecta
- Order: Coleoptera
- Suborder: Adephaga
- Family: Gyrinidae
- Subfamily: Gyrininae
- Tribe: Gyrinini
- Genus: Aulonogyrus; Motschulsky, 1853

= Aulonogyrus =

Genus of beetles

Aulonogyrus is a genus of beetles in the family Gyrinidae, containing the following species:

- Aulonogyrus abdominalis (Aubé, 1838)
- Aulonogyrus abyssinicus Régimbart, 1883
- Aulonogyrus aculeatulus Ochs, 1933
- Aulonogyrus acutus Brinck, 1955
- Aulonogyrus algoensis Régimbart, 1883
- Aulonogyrus alternatus Régimbart, 1892
- Aulonogyrus amoenulus (Boheman, 1848)
- Aulonogyrus angustatus (Dahl, 1823)
- Aulonogyrus antipodum Fauvel, 1903
- Aulonogyrus arrowi Régimbart, 1907
- Aulonogyrus ater Brinck, 1955
- Aulonogyrus aureus Brinck, 1955
- Aulonogyrus bachmanni Ochs, 1937
- Aulonogyrus bedeli Régimbart, 1883
- Aulonogyrus caffer (Aubé, 1838)
- Aulonogyrus camerunensis Ochs, 1933
- Aulonogyrus capensis (Thunberg, 1781)
- Aulonogyrus capensis Bjerken, 1787
- Aulonogyrus carinipennis Régimbart, 1895
- Aulonogyrus centralis Ochs, 1928
- Aulonogyrus clementi Legros, 1946
- Aulonogyrus concinnus (Klug in Ehrenberg, 1834)
- Aulonogyrus conspicuus Ochs, 1929
- Aulonogyrus convena Guignot, 1955
- Aulonogyrus cristatus Régimbart, 1903
- Aulonogyrus denti Ochs, 1937
- Aulonogyrus depressus Brinck, 1955
- Aulonogyrus elegantissimus Régimbart, 1883
- Aulonogyrus epipleuricus Régimbart, 1906
- Aulonogyrus flavipes (Boheman, 1848)
- Aulonogyrus flaviventris Régimbart, 1906
- Aulonogyrus formosus (Modeer, 1776)
- Aulonogyrus graueri Ochs, 1937
- Aulonogyrus hypoxanthus Régimbart, 1906
- Aulonogyrus inyanganensis Mazzoldi, 1996
- Aulonogyrus kasikiensis Ochs, 1937
- Aulonogyrus knysnanus Brinck, 1955
- Aulonogyrus latens Brinck, 1955
- Aulonogyrus luimbalus Brinck, 1955
- Aulonogyrus malkini Brinck, 1955
- Aulonogyrus manoviensis Ochs, 1937
- Aulonogyrus marginatus (Aubé, 1838)
- Aulonogyrus monticola Brinck, 1951
- Aulonogyrus naviculus Brinck, 1955
- Aulonogyrus obliquus (Walker, 1858)
- Aulonogyrus rhodesianus Brinck, 1955
- Aulonogyrus sesotho Brinck, 1966
- Aulonogyrus seydeli Ochs, 1954
- Aulonogyrus sharpi Régimbart, 1883
- Aulonogyrus splendidulus (Dupont in Aubé, 1838)
- Aulonogyrus striatus (Fabricius, 1792)
- Aulonogyrus strigosus (Fabricius, 1801)
- Aulonogyrus varians Brinck, 1955
- Aulonogyrus vethi Régimbart, 1886
- Aulonogyrus wehnckei Régimbart, 1883
