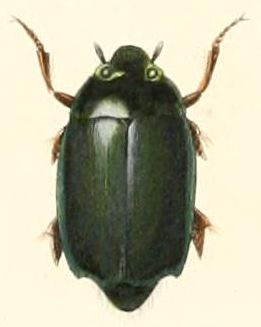
- Macrogyrus depressus

Scientific classification
- Kingdom: Animalia
- Phylum: Arthropoda
- Class: Insecta
- Order: Coleoptera
- Suborder: Adephaga
- Family: Gyrinidae
- Genus: Macrogyrus
- Subgenus: Andogyrus; Ochs, 1924

Type species
- Enhydrus ellipticus Brullé, 1836

= Andogyrus =

Subgenus of beetles

Andogyrus is a subgenus of Macrogyrus, a genus of beetles in the family Gyrinidae. It was formerly considered a distinct genus, until a phylogenetic study in 2017 downgraded it in rank to a subgenus. It contains the following species:

- Macrogyrus attenuatus (Ochs, 1954)
- Macrogyrus bos (Brinck, 1977)
- Macrogyrus buqueti (Aubé, 1838)
- Macrogyrus busculus (Brinck, 1977)
- Macrogyrus clypealis (Brinck, 1977)
- Macrogyrus colombicus Régimbart, 1890
  - Macrogyrus colombicus brincki Fery & Hájek, 2021 (new name for Andogyrus colombicus australis Brinck, 1977)
  - Macrogyrus colombicus colombicus Régimbart, 1890
- Macrogyrus depressus (Brullé, 1838)
- Macrogyrus ellipticus (Brullé, 1838)
- Macrogyrus forsteri (Ochs, 1958)
- Macrogyrus gaujoni (Ochs, 1954)
- Macrogyrus glaucus (Aubé, 1838)
- Macrogyrus lojensis Régimbart, 1892
- Macrogyrus ohausi (Ochs, 1954)
- Macrogyrus peruvianus Régimbart, 1907
- Macrogyrus productus (Brinck, 1977)
- Macrogyrus puncticollis (Ochs, 1954)
- Macrogyrus sedilloti Régimbart, 1883
- Macrogyrus seriatopunctatus Régimbart, 1883
- Macrogyrus viscus (Brinck, 1977)
- Macrogyrus zimmermanni (Ochs, 1954)
