= Miodineutes =

Scientific classification
- Kingdom: Animalia
- Phylum: Arthropoda
- Class: Insecta
- Order: Coleoptera
- Suborder: Adephaga
- Family: Gyrinidae
- Subfamily: Gyrininae
- Tribe: Dineutini
- Genus: †Miodineutes; Hatch, 1927

Genus of beetles

Miodineutes is an extinct genus of fossil beetles in the family Gyrinidae, containing the following species:

- Miodineutes heeri Hatch, 1927
- Miodineutes insignis (Heer, 1862)
- Miodineutes oeningenensis Hatch, 1927
