= Metagyrinus =

Scientific classification
- Kingdom: Animalia
- Phylum: Arthropoda
- Class: Insecta
- Order: Coleoptera
- Suborder: Adephaga
- Family: Gyrinidae
- Subfamily: Gyrininae
- Tribe: Gyrinini
- Genus: Metagyrinus; Brinck, 1955

Genus of beetles

Metagyrinus is a genus of beetles in the family Gyrinidae, containing the following species:

- Metagyrinus arrowi (Régimbart, 1907)
- Metagyrinus sinensis (Ochs, 1924)
- Metagyrinus vitalisi (Peschet, 1923)
