= Gyrinus aeratus =

Scientific classification
- Kingdom: Animalia
- Phylum: Arthropoda
- Class: Insecta
- Order: Coleoptera
- Suborder: Adephaga
- Family: Gyrinidae
- Genus: Gyrinus
- Species: G. aeratus

Binomial name
- Gyrinus aeratus Stephens, 1835

Synonyms
- Gyrinus instabilis Fall, 1931

Species of beetle

Gyrinus aeratus is a species of whirligig beetle in the family Gyrinidae. It is found in North America and Europe.
