= Anagyrinus =

Anagyrinus Temporal range: Hettangian

Scientific classification
- Kingdom: Animalia
- Phylum: Arthropoda
- Class: Insecta
- Order: Coleoptera
- Suborder: Adephaga
- Family: Gyrinidae
- Genus: †Anagyrinus; Handlirsch, 1906
- Species: †A. atavus

Binomial name
- †Anagyrinus atavus (Heer, 1865)

Genus of beetles

Anagyrinus atavus is an extinct species of fossil beetle in the family Gyrinidae, the only species in the genus Anagyrinus. It is known from the Hettangian aged Insektenmergel Formation of Switzerland
