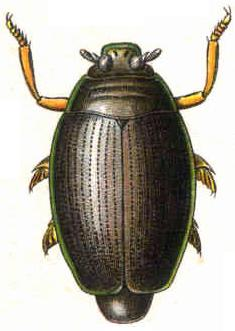
- G. natator

Scientific classification
- Kingdom: Animalia
- Phylum: Arthropoda
- Class: Insecta
- Order: Coleoptera
- Suborder: Adephaga
- Family: Gyrinidae
- Subfamily: Gyrininae
- Tribe: Gyrinini
- Genus: Gyrinus; Geoffroy, 1762

= Gyrinus =

Genus of beetles

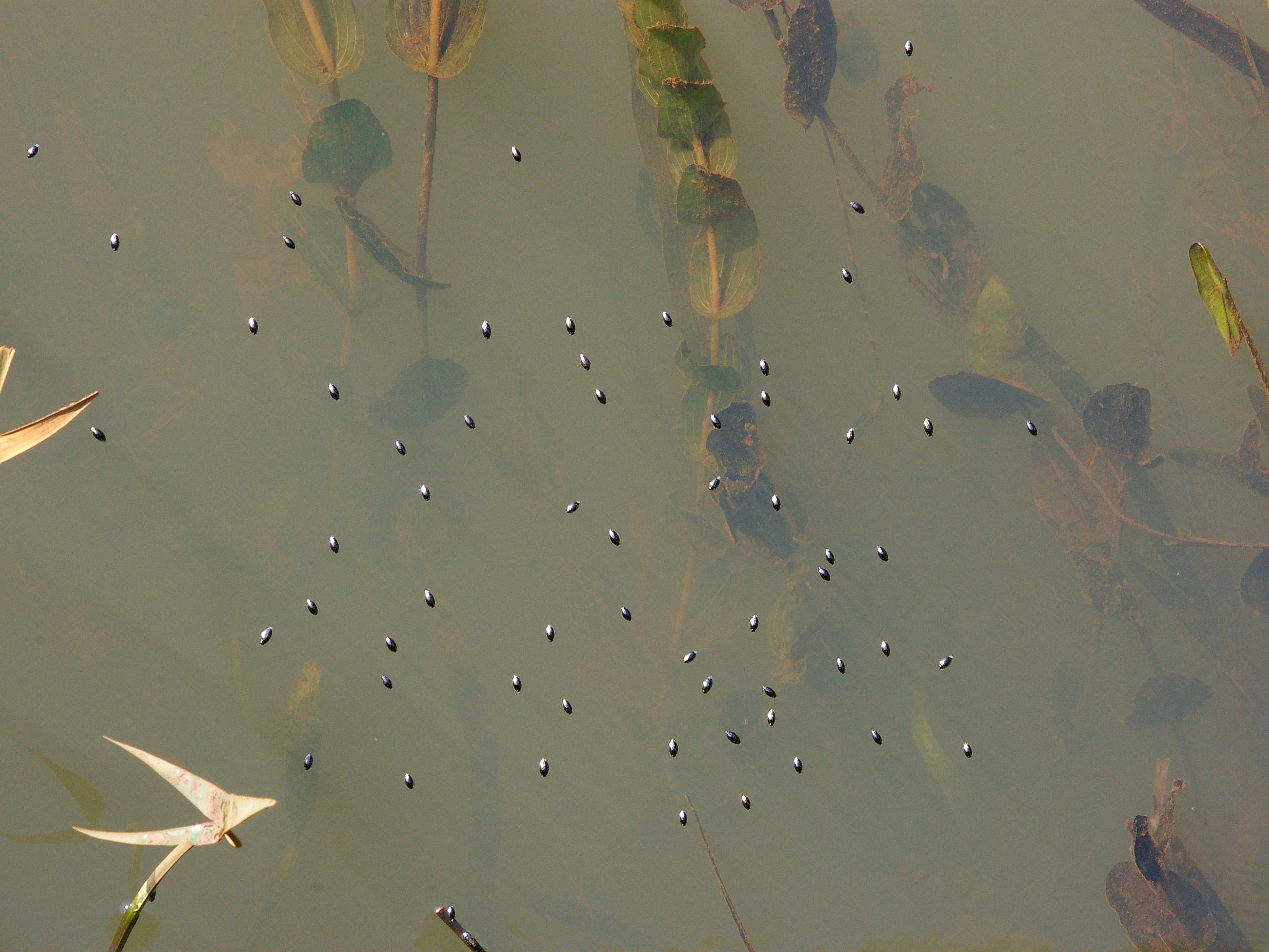
A group of Gyrinus sp.

Gyrinus is a genus of small aquatic whirligig beetles in the family Gyrinidae native to the Palearctic (including Europe), the Near East, the Nearctic, North Africa, Asia and Australia.

== Species ==
These species belong to the genus Gyrinus:

- Gyrinus aeneiceps Sturm, 1843
- Gyrinus aeneolus LeConte, 1868
- Gyrinus aequatorius Régimbart, 1883
- Gyrinus aeratus Stephens, 1835
- Gyrinus aerosus Ochs, 1967
- Gyrinus affinis Dejean, 1821
- Gyrinus ahlwarti Ochs, 1949
- Gyrinus amazonicus Ochs, 1958
- Gyrinus americanus Melsheimer, 1806
- Gyrinus analis Say, 1825
- Gyrinus aquiris LeConte, 1868
- Gyrinus aquisextanea Nel, 1989
- Gyrinus arctus Dejean, 1833
- Gyrinus argentinus Steinheil, 1869
- Gyrinus aubei LeConte, 1863
- Gyrinus austriacus Dejean, 1821
- Gyrinus baeri Régimbart, 1907
- Gyrinus bicolor Fabricius, 1787
- Gyrinus bifarius Fall, 1922
- Gyrinus bolivianus Ochs, 1954
- Gyrinus borealis Melsheimer, 1806
- Gyrinus brinki Ali & Jasim, 1989
- Gyrinus caledonicus Régimbart, 1883
- Gyrinus caspius Ménétries, 1832
- Gyrinus cavatus Atton, 1990
- Gyrinus ceylonicus Régimbart, 1883
- Gyrinus chalybaeus Perty, 1830
- Gyrinus chalybeus Sturm, 1843
- Gyrinus circumnans LeConte, 1850
- Gyrinus colasi Mouchamps, 1957
- Gyrinus colombicus Régimbart, 1883
- Gyrinus columbinus Dejean, 1833
- Gyrinus colymbus Erichson, 1837
- Gyrinus compressus Sturm, 1826
- Gyrinus confinis LeConte, 1868
- Gyrinus consobrinus LeConte, 1852
- Gyrinus continuus Régimbart, 1907
- Gyrinus convexiusculus Macleay, 1871
- Gyrinus costaricensis Ochs, 1935
- Gyrinus crassus Aubé, 1838
- Gyrinus curtus Motschulsky, 1866
- Gyrinus cylindricus Dahl, 1823
- Gyrinus dampfi Ochs, 1949
- Gyrinus deceptorius Ochs, 1949
- Gyrinus dejeani Brullé, 1832
- Gyrinus dentipennis Macleay, 1825
- Gyrinus dichrous LeConte, 1868
- Gyrinus dicrus Melsheimer, 1806
- Gyrinus dimorphus Régimbart, 1884
- Gyrinus distinctus Aubé, 1838
- Gyrinus dubius Wallis, 1926
- Gyrinus duplicatus LeConte, 1850
- Gyrinus elevatus LeConte, 1868
- Gyrinus ellipticus Dejean, 1833
- Gyrinus elongatus Marsham, 1802
- Gyrinus emarginatus Dejean, 1821
- Gyrinus exstriatus Say, 1837
- Gyrinus feminalis Mouchamps, 1957
- Gyrinus finitimus Mouchamps, 1957
- Gyrinus fittkaui Ochs, 1963
- Gyrinus fraternus Couper, 1865
- Gyrinus galapagoensis Dyke, 1953
- Gyrinus gayi Solier, 1849
- Gyrinus gehringi Chamberlain, 1929
- Gyrinus gestroi Régimbart, 1883
- Gyrinus gibber LeConte, 1868
- Gyrinus gibbulus Dejean, 1833
- Gyrinus gibbus Aubé, 1838
- Gyrinus grandis Sturm, 1817
- Gyrinus guianus Ochs, 1935
- Gyrinus gulosus Dahl, 1823
- Gyrinus haasi Ochs, 1933
- Gyrinus hoppingi Leech, 1938
- Gyrinus ignitus Régimbart, 1895
- Gyrinus impatiens Aubé, 1838
- Gyrinus impressicollis Kirby, 1837
- Gyrinus japonicus Sharp, 1873
- Gyrinus laevicollis Ochs, 1949
- Gyrinus laevigatus Dejean, 1821
- Gyrinus lateralis Dejean, 1833
- Gyrinus latilimbus Fall, 1922
- Gyrinus leathesii Curtis, 1839
- Gyrinus lecontei Fall, 1922
- Gyrinus libanus Aubé, 1838
- Gyrinus limbatus Say, 1825
- Gyrinus lineatus Dejean, 1821
- Gyrinus longimanus Melsheimer, 1806
- Gyrinus longiusculus LeConte, 1850
- Gyrinus longulus Ochs, 1967
- Gyrinus luctuosus Régimbart, 1883
- Gyrinus luederwaldti Zimmermann, 1923
- Gyrinus maculiventris LeConte, 1868
- Gyrinus madagascariensis Aubé, 1838
- Gyrinus marginatus Dejean, 1833
- Gyrinus marginellus Fall, 1922
- Gyrinus marinus Gyllenhal, 1808
- Gyrinus merganser Gemminger & Harold, 1868
- Gyrinus mergus Say, 1837
- Gyrinus microtuberculatus Hatch, 1951
- Gyrinus minutus Fabricius, 1798
- Gyrinus mithrae Zaitzev, 1908
- Gyrinus modestus Dejean, 1833
- Gyrinus monrosi Mouchamps, 1957
- Gyrinus natalensis Régimbart, 1892
- Gyrinus natans Sturm, 1826
- Gyrinus natator (Linnaeus, 1758)
- Gyrinus neptunus Melsheimer, 1806
- Gyrinus nigellus Ochs, 1954
- Gyrinus niponensis Brinck, 1941
- Gyrinus nitidulus Dahl, 1823
- Gyrinus nitidus Dahl, 1823
- Gyrinus obliquus Walker, 1858
- Gyrinus oblongus Dejean, 1833
- Gyrinus obtusus Say, 1834
- Gyrinus oceanicus Régimbart, 1883
- Gyrinus olivaceus (Dejean, 1833)
- Gyrinus opacus Sahlberg, 1819
- Gyrinus opalinus Régimbart, 1883
- Gyrinus orientalis Régimbart, 1883
- Gyrinus ovatus Klug, 1829
- Gyrinus pachysomus Fall, 1922
- Gyrinus parcus Say, 1834
- Gyrinus parvulus Dejean, 1833
- Gyrinus patruelis LeConte, 1850
- Gyrinus paykulli Ochs, 1927
- Gyrinus pectoralis Villa & Villa, 1833
- Gyrinus pernitidus LeConte, 1868
- Gyrinus peruvianus Régimbart, 1907
- Gyrinus piceolus Blatchley, 1910
- Gyrinus picipes Dejean, 1833
- Gyrinus pleuralis Fall, 1922
- Gyrinus plicifer LeConte, 1852
- Gyrinus politus Sturm, 1826
- Gyrinus praemarinus Lomnicki, 1894
- Gyrinus praemorsus Sturm, 1826
- Gyrinus priscus Lesne, 1927
- Gyrinus propinquus Ochs, 1954
- Gyrinus pugionis Fall, 1922
- Gyrinus pulcher Sturm, 1826
- Gyrinus pullatus Zaitzev, 1908
- Gyrinus punctipennis Régimbart, 1907
- Gyrinus pygolampis Modeer, 1776
- Gyrinus racenisi Ochs, 1953
- Gyrinus regimbarti Peyerimhoff, 1931
- Gyrinus reitteri Ochs, 1942
- Gyrinus revolvens LeConte, 1850
- Gyrinus rockinghamensis LeConte, 1868
- Gyrinus rozei Ochs, 1953
- Gyrinus rugifer Régimbart, 1883
- Gyrinus rugosus Oygur and Wolfe, 1991
- Gyrinus ryukyuensis Satô, 1971
- Gyrinus sachalinensis Kamiya, 1936
- Gyrinus sayi Aubé, 1838
- Gyrinus schaumii White, 1847
- Gyrinus schneideri Ochs, 1956
- Gyrinus schoenfelderi Ochs, 1954
- Gyrinus schoutedeni Ochs, 1928
- Gyrinus sculpturatus Mjöberg, 1905
- Gyrinus sericeolimbatus Régimbart, 1883
- Gyrinus siolii Ochs, 1958
- Gyrinus smaragdinus Régimbart, 1891
- Gyrinus splendens Ochs, 1949
- Gyrinus splendidus Dejean, 1821
- Gyrinus stagnalis Dahl, 1823
- Gyrinus suaveolens Melsheimer, 1806
- Gyrinus subcostulatus Moroni, 1977
- Gyrinus subductus Ochs, 1967
- Gyrinus substriatus Sturm, 1826
- Gyrinus suffriani Scriba, 1855
- Gyrinus superciliaris Régimbart, 1892
- Gyrinus suspiciosus Ochs, 1930
- Gyrinus szechuanensis Ochs, 1929
- Gyrinus tauricus Dejean, 1833
- Gyrinus tenuistriatus Régimbart, 1883
- Gyrinus thurtarus Ali & Jasim, 1989
- Gyrinus toxopeusi Ochs, 1955
- Gyrinus tsingtaoriensis Cheo, 1934
- Gyrinus turbinator Sharp, 1882
- Gyrinus unidentatus Dejean, 1821
- Gyrinus urinator Illiger, 1807
- Gyrinus velox Dahl, 1823
- Gyrinus venezolensis Ochs, 1953
- Gyrinus ventralis Kirby, 1837
- Gyrinus vernalis Motschulsky, 1859
- Gyrinus vicinus Dejean, 1833
- Gyrinus vindilicus Lesne, 1927
- Gyrinus violaceus Régimbart, 1883
- Gyrinus vollmari Gistel, 1834
- Gyrinus wallisi Fall, 1922
- Gyrinus woodruffi Fall, 1922
- Gyrinus zimmermanni Franck, 1932
