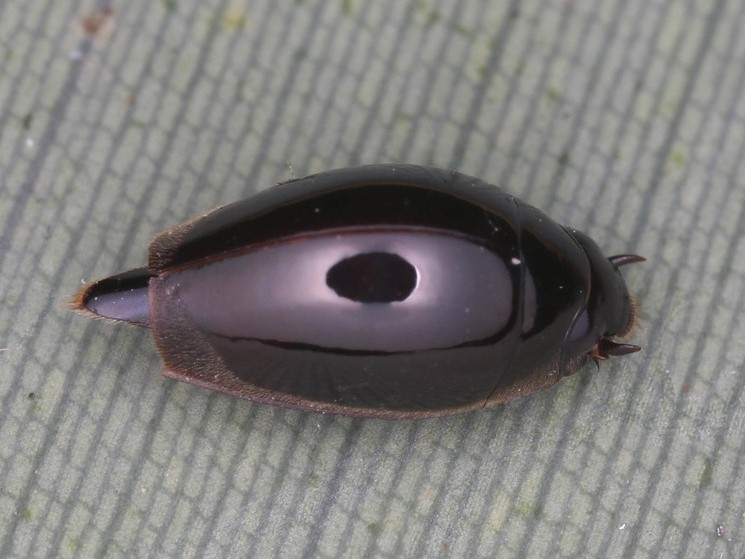

Scientific classification
- Kingdom: Animalia
- Phylum: Arthropoda
- Class: Insecta
- Order: Coleoptera
- Suborder: Adephaga
- Family: Gyrinidae
- Subfamily: Gyrininae
- Tribe: Orectochilini
- Genus: Gyretes; Brullé, 1835

= Gyretes =

Genus of beetles

Gyretes is a genus of beetles in the family Gyrinidae, containing the following species:

- Gyretes acuminatus Ochs, 1967
- Gyretes acutangulus Sharp, 1882
- Gyretes agilis Ochs, 1965
- Gyretes alius Ochs, 1964
- Gyretes analis Ochs, 1965
- Gyretes angulosus Ochs, 1963
- Gyretes angustatus Régimbart, 1884
- Gyretes angusticinctus Ochs, 1957
- Gyretes angustipes Ochs, 1965
- Gyretes antonioni Ochs, 1967
- Gyretes apicalis Ochs, 1963
- Gyretes assimilis Ochs, 1953
- Gyretes associandus Ochs, 1965
- Gyretes atricolor Ochs, 1963
- Gyretes audax Ochs, 1965
- Gyretes bahiensis Ochs, 1963
- Gyretes bechynei Ochs, 1980
- Gyretes bidens (Olivier, 1795)
- Gyretes blandulus Ochs, 1964
- Gyretes bohumilae Ochs, 1980
- Gyretes bolivari Régimbart, 1884
- Gyretes boucardi Sharp, 1882
- Gyretes brownei Ochs, 1958
- Gyretes bruchi Ochs, 1929
- Gyretes brunnescens Ochs, 1953
- Gyretes burmeisteri Ochs, 1929
- Gyretes carbonelli Ochs, 1956
- Gyretes carulus Ochs, 1980
- Gyretes celox Ochs, 1965
- Gyretes centralis Régimbart, 1907
- Gyretes ceylonicus Redtenbacher, 1868
- Gyretes ciliatus Ochs, 1958
- Gyretes cinctoides Ochs, 1963
- Gyretes cinctus (Germar, 1824)
- Gyretes cingulatus Ochs, 1965
- Gyretes circellaris Ochs, 1966
- Gyretes clypealis Ochs, 1964
- Gyretes collinus Ochs, 1965
- Gyretes connatus Ochs, 1960
- Gyretes convexior Ochs, 1934
- Gyretes cramptoni Ochs, 1955
- Gyretes cubensis Régimbart, 1884
- Gyretes curtulus Ochs, 1965
- Gyretes dampfi Ochs, 1949
- Gyretes darlingtoni Ochs, 1938
- Gyretes decumanus Ochs, 1965
- Gyretes dentatus Ochs, 1963
- Gyretes dentellus Ochs, 1963
- Gyretes depressus Ochs, 1960
- Gyretes dimorphus Ochs, 1934
- Gyretes discifer Walker, 1859
- Gyretes discus Erichson, 1848
- Gyretes distinctus Sturm, 1843
- Gyretes distinguendus Régimbart, 1907
- Gyretes dorsalis (Brullé, 1838)
- Gyretes dubius Ochs, 1929
- Gyretes duidensis Ochs, 1955
- Gyretes elatior Ochs, 1951
- Gyretes elegans Ochs, 1960
- Gyretes eximius Ochs, 1964
- Gyretes facetus Ochs, 1967
- Gyretes fallaciosus Ochs, 1929
- Gyretes fastidiosus Ochs, 1967
- Gyretes fiebrigi Ochs, 1953
- Gyretes fittkaui Ochs, 1964
- Gyretes franzae Ochs, 1963
- Gyretes fraternus Ochs, 1967
- Gyretes fraudulentus Ochs, 1958
- Gyretes fugax Ochs, 1965
- Gyretes funestus Ochs, 1934
- Gyretes gagatinus Ochs, 1963
- Gyretes geayi Régimbart, 1904
- Gyretes geijskesi Ochs, 1963
- Gyretes geminus Ochs, 1965
- Gyretes gibbosus Ochs, 1953
- Gyretes gibbus Ochs, 1953
- Gyretes giganteus (Piton, 1940)
- Gyretes glabratus Régimbart, 1882
- Gyretes glabricollis Ochs, 1980
- Gyretes glabroides Ochs, 1951
- Gyretes globosus Ochs, 1929
- Gyretes gradualis Régimbart, 1907
- Gyretes grisescens Ochs, 1953
- Gyretes guatemalensis Régimbart, 1884
- Gyretes guianus Ochs, 1955
- Gyretes hastatus (Fabricius, 1801)
- Gyretes henoni Régimbart, 1886
- Gyretes hintoni Balfour-Browne, 1946
- Gyretes hoegei Ochs, 1954
- Gyretes hoffmanni Ochs, 1934
- Gyretes hummelincki Ochs, 1964
- Gyretes ictericus Ochs, 1965
- Gyretes imitatus Ochs, 1958
- Gyretes impiger Ochs, 1965
- Gyretes incommodus Ochs, 1965
- Gyretes inflatus Régimbart, 1892
- Gyretes inlobatus Ochs, 1963
- Gyretes iricolor Young, 1947
- Gyretes jacobi Ochs, 1932
- Gyretes latipes Ochs, 1960
- Gyretes leionotus (Dejean, 1836)
- Gyretes lepidus Ochs, 1965
- Gyretes levis Brullé, 1838
- Gyretes limbalis Régimbart, 1907
- Gyretes limbellus Ochs, 1980
- Gyretes lindemannae Ochs, 1965
- Gyretes lobatus Ochs, 1929
- Gyretes lobifer Ochs, 1964
- Gyretes lojensis Régimbart, 1892
- Gyretes longulus Ochs, 1953
- Gyretes lucidus Ochs, 1929
- Gyretes luctuosus Ochs, 1934
- Gyretes luederwaldti Ochs, 1929
- Gyretes luperus Ochs, 1967
- Gyretes marcuzzii Guignot, 1953
- Gyretes melanarius Aubé, 1838
- Gyretes mendosus Ochs, 1951
- Gyretes mergus Ochs, 1967
- Gyretes meridionalis Régimbart, 1884
- Gyretes mexicanus Régimbart, 1884
- Gyretes minax Ochs, 1967
- Gyretes minor Régimbart, 1884
- Gyretes minusculus Ochs, 1953
- Gyretes molestus Ochs, 1965
- Gyretes morio (Dejean, 1833)
- Gyretes multisetosus Ochs, 1929
- Gyretes mutatus Ochs, 1965
- Gyretes nanulus Ochs, 1964
- Gyretes nevermanni Ochs, 1935
- Gyretes nigrilabris Ochs, 1938
- Gyretes nitidulus Laboulbène, 1853
- Gyretes nothus Ochs, 1980
- Gyretes nubilus Ochs, 1965
- Gyretes nudicollis Ochs, 1964
- Gyretes oberthueri Ochs, 1965
- Gyretes obesus Ochs, 1958
- Gyretes oblongus Régimbart, 1884
- Gyretes ochsi Brinck, 1944
- Gyretes ohausi Ochs, 1951
- Gyretes onerans Ochs, 1965
- Gyretes orinocensis Ochs, 1958
- Gyretes pachysomus Ochs, 1960
- Gyretes palmatus Ochs, 1965
- Gyretes parcior Ochs, 1965
- Gyretes parvulus Laboulbène, 1853
- Gyretes patruelis Ochs, 1956
- Gyretes paulistanus Ochs, 1958
- Gyretes pauxillus Ochs, 1964
- Gyretes pertinax Ochs, 1967
- Gyretes peruvianus Ochs, 1953
- Gyretes pescheti Ochs, 1929
- Gyretes petax Ochs, 1965
- Gyretes pilicollis Ochs, 1965
- Gyretes pipitzi Régimbart, 1892
- Gyretes plagiatus Ochs, 1934
- Gyretes planoides Ochs, 1960
- Gyretes plaumanni Ochs, 1943
- Gyretes procerulus Ochs, 1967
- Gyretes prolongatus Ochs, 1965
- Gyretes proximus Sharp, 1882
- Gyretes puberulus Ochs, 1967
- Gyretes pubicollis Ochs, 1964
- Gyretes pugnax Ochs, 1966
- Gyretes pygidialis Balfour-Browne, 1946
- Gyretes pygmaeolus Ochs, 1963
- Gyretes pygmaeus Régimbart, 1882
- Gyretes rapax Ochs, 1966
- Gyretes rectangulus Ochs, 1967
- Gyretes reginae Ochs, 1960
- Gyretes roraimensis Ochs, 1955
- Gyretes rosalesi Ochs, 1980
- Gyretes sagax Ochs, 1967
- Gyretes sallei Laboulbène, 1853
- Gyretes salvadorensis Ochs, 1952
- Gyretes sattleri Ochs, 1967
- Gyretes scaphidiformis Régimbart, 1882
- Gyretes schubarti Ochs, 1958
- Gyretes scitulus (Dejean, 1833)
- Gyretes scitus Ochs, 1960
- Gyretes sculpturatus Ochs, 1934
- Gyretes sedulus Ochs, 1965
- Gyretes sejugandus Ochs, 1960
- Gyretes separandus Ochs, 1965
- Gyretes sericeus (Dejean, 1833)
- Gyretes sertatus Ochs, 1967
- Gyretes setiger Ochs, 1965
- Gyretes sexualis Régimbart, 1884
- Gyretes sharpi Régimbart, 1884
- Gyretes simpsoni White, 1847
- Gyretes sinuatus LeConte, 1852
- Gyretes siolii Ochs, 1958
- Gyretes sobrinus Ochs, 1965
- Gyretes sodalis Ochs, 1965
- Gyretes speculum Ochs, 1965
- Gyretes strandi Ochs, 1935
- Gyretes strigosus Ochs, 1963
- Gyretes subcordatus Ochs, 1963
- Gyretes submersus Ochs, 1967
- Gyretes subrhomboideus Ochs, 1963
- Gyretes suntheimi Ochs, 1932
- Gyretes surinamensis Ochs, 1958
- Gyretes suturalis Régimbart, 1884
- Gyretes tarsalis Ochs, 1953
- Gyretes tatei Ochs, 1955
- Gyretes tenax Ochs, 1966
- Gyretes terminalis Ochs, 1967
- Gyretes tiriyo Ochs, 1967
- Gyretes torosus Babin, 2004
- Gyretes torrenticola Ochs, 1934
- Gyretes transitus Ochs, 1953
- Gyretes tumidus Régimbart, 1884
- Gyretes unicolor Ochs, 1963
- Gyretes venezuelensis Régimbart, 1884
- Gyretes vicinus Ochs, 1964
- Gyretes villosomarginatus Ochs, 1924
- Gyretes vittatus (Dejean, 1833)
- Gyretes volvulus Ochs, 1980
- Gyretes vorax Ochs, 1966
- Gyretes vulneratus (Dejean, 1836)
- Gyretes yepezi Ochs, 1980
- Gyretes zilchi Ochs, 1952
- Gyretes zimmermanni Ochs, 1929
