= Gyrinoides =

Gyrinoides limbatus

Scientific classification
- Kingdom: Animalia
- Phylum: Arthropoda
- Class: Insecta
- Order: Coleoptera
- Suborder: Adephaga
- Family: Gyrinidae
- Subfamily: Gyrininae
- Tribe: Gyrinini
- Genus: †Gyrinoides; Motschulsky, 1856
- Species: †G. limbatus

Binomial name
- †Gyrinoides limbatus Motschulsky, 1856

Genus of beetles

Gyrinoides limbatus is an extinct species of beetle in the family Gyrinidae, the only species in the genus Gyrinoides.
