= Mesogyrus =

Mesogyrus Temporal range: Oxfordian–Aptian

Scientific classification
- Kingdom: Animalia
- Phylum: Arthropoda
- Class: Insecta
- Order: Coleoptera
- Suborder: Adephaga
- Family: Gyrinidae
- Subfamily: Heterogyrinae
- Genus: †Mesogyrus; Ponomarenko, 1973

Genus of beetles

Mesogyrus is an extinct genus of fossil beetles in the family Gyrinidae, containing the following species:

- †Mesogyrus anglicus Ponomarenko et al. 2005 Durlston Formation, United Kingdom, Berriasian
- †Mesogyrus antiquus Ponomarenko, 1973 Karabastau Formation, Kazakhstan, Oxfordian
- †Mesogyrus elongates Ponomarenko 2014 Sharteg, Mongolia, Tithonian
- †Mesogyrus sibiricus Ponomarenko, 1985 Abasheva Formation, Russia, Pliensbachian
- †Mesogyrus striatus Ponomarenko, 1973 Byankinskaya Formation, Russia, Tithonian Daya Formation, Russia Hauterivian Turga Formation, Russia, Aptian
