= Baissogyrus =

Baissogyrus savilovi Temporal range: Aptian

Scientific classification
- Kingdom: Animalia
- Phylum: Arthropoda
- Class: Insecta
- Order: Coleoptera
- Suborder: Adephaga
- Family: Gyrinidae
- Subfamily: Heterogyrinae
- Genus: †Baissogyrus; Ponomarenko, 1973
- Species: †B. savilovi

Binomial name
- †Baissogyrus savilovi Ponomarenko, 1973

Genus of beetles

Baissogyrus savilovi is an extinct species of fossil beetle in the family Gyrinidae, the only species in the genus Baissogyrus. It is named after the Baissa locality of the Early Cretaceous (Aptian) Zaza Formation, in Buryatia, Russia, where it was found.
