= Mesodineutes =

Mesodineutes amurensis

Scientific classification
- Kingdom: Animalia
- Phylum: Arthropoda
- Class: Insecta
- Order: Coleoptera
- Suborder: Adephaga
- Family: Gyrinidae
- Subfamily: Gyrininae
- Tribe: Dineutini
- Genus: †Mesodineutes; Ponomarenko, 1977
- Species: †M. amurensis

Binomial name
- †Mesodineutes amurensis Ponomarenko, 1977

Genus of beetles

Mesodineutes amurensis is an extinct species of fossil beetle in the family Gyrinidae, the only species in the genus Mesodineutes.
