= Angarogyrus =

Angarogyrus Temporal range: Toarcian–Aptian

Scientific classification
- Kingdom: Animalia
- Phylum: Arthropoda
- Class: Insecta
- Order: Coleoptera
- Suborder: Adephaga
- Family: Gyrinidae
- Subfamily: Spanglerogyrinae
- Genus: †Angarogyrus; Ponomarenko, 1977

Genus of beetles

Angarogyrus is an extinct genus of fossil beetles in the family Gyrinidae, containing the following species:

- Angarogyrus minimus Ponomarenko, 1977 Cheremkhovskaya Formation, Russia, Early Jurassic (Toarcian)
- Angarogyrus mongolicus Ponomarenko, 1986 Gurvan-Eren Formation, Mongolia, Early Cretaceous (Aptian)
