= Cretotortor =

Cretotortor Temporal range: Turonian–Danian

Scientific classification
- Kingdom: Animalia
- Phylum: Arthropoda
- Class: Insecta
- Order: Coleoptera
- Suborder: Adephaga
- Family: Gyrinidae
- Subfamily: Heterogyrinae
- Genus: †Cretotortor; Ponomarenko, 1973

Genus of beetles

Cretotortor is an extinct genus of fossil beetles in the family Gyrinidae, containing the following species:

- Cretotortor archarensis Ponomarenko, 1977 Darmakan Formation, Russia, Paleocene (Danian)
- Cretotortor zherichini Ponomarenko, 1973 Kzyl-Zhar, Kazakhstan, Late Cretaceous (Turonian)
