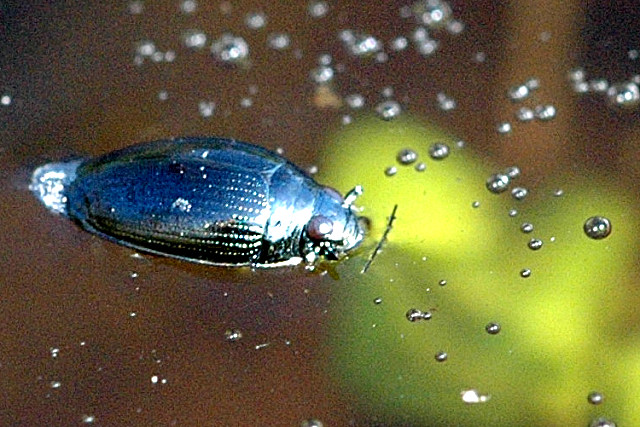

Scientific classification
- Kingdom: Animalia
- Phylum: Arthropoda
- Class: Insecta
- Order: Coleoptera
- Suborder: Adephaga
- Family: Gyrinidae
- Genus: Gyrinus
- Species: G. substriatus

Binomial name
- Gyrinus substriatus Stephens, 1829

= Gyrinus substriatus =

Species of beetle

Gyrinus substriatus is a species of beetle native to Europe, the Near East, and North Africa. In Europe, it is only found in Austria, Belarus, Belgium, Bosnia and Herzegovina, Great Britain (incl. Isle of Man), Bulgaria, Croatia, the Czech Republic, mainland Denmark, Estonia, Finland, mainland France, Germany, mainland Greece, Hungary, Ireland, mainland Italy, Liechtenstein, North Macedonia, mainland Norway, Poland, mainland Portugal, Russia, Slovakia, Slovenia, mainland Spain, Sweden, Switzerland, the Netherlands, Ukraine and Yugoslavia. This is one of the most common species of whirligig beetle.
