= Maurice Auguste Régimbart =

French entomologist

Maurice Auguste Régimbart (1852 in Evreux – 22 September 1907 in Evreux) was a French entomologist who specialised in Coleoptera, particularly Dytiscidae, Gyrinidae and Hydrophilidae. Regimbart worked on expedition material collected mainly from French, Italian and Belgian colonies. He was a member of the Société entomologique de France.

== Selected works ==
- 1877. Recherches sur les organes copulateurs et sur les fonctions génitales dans le genre Dytiscus. Ann. Soc. Entomol. France 46:263-274 + pl. 6.
- 1878. Etude sur la classification des Dytiscides. Ann. Soc. Entomol. France 8:447-466.
- 1882. Essai monographique de la famille des Gyrinidae, pt. 1. Ann. Soc. Entomol. France (6 ser., vol. 2) 51:379-458 + 3 pls.
- 1883. Essai monographique de la famille des Gyrinidae, pt. 2. Ann. Soc. Entomol. France (6 ser., vol. 3) 52:121-190 + 5 pls.
- 1888. Descriptions de Dytiscides nouveaux de l'Amérique de Sud. Ann. Soc. Entomol. France 57:388-392.
- 1888. Viaggio di Leonardo Fea in Birmania e regioni vicine. Ann. Mus. Civ. Storia Nat. Genoa 26:609-623.
- 1889. Contributions à la faune indochinoise. 2. Hydrocanthares. Ann. Soc. Entomol. France 58:147-156.
- 1892. Insectes du Bengale Occidental. 16. Hydrocanthares. Ann. Soc. Entomol. Belg. 36:112-121.
- 1892. Viaggio di Lamberto Loria nella Papuasia orientale. iv. Haliplidae, Dytiscidae, et Gyrinidae. Ann. Mus. Civ. Storia Nat. Genoa 1892(2):978-997.
- 1894. Voyage de M. E. Simon dans l'Afrique australe (décembre-mars 1893). 1. Haliplidae, Dytiscidae and Gyrinidae. Ann. Soc. Entomol. France 63:227-240.
- 1895. Révision des Dytiscidae et Gyrinidae d'Afrique, Madagascar et îles voisines. En contribution à la faune entomologique du Congo. Mem. Soc. Entomol. Belg. 4:1-244.
- 1899. Révision des Dytiscidae de la région indo-sino-malaise. Ann. Soc. Entomol. France 68:186-367.
- 1902. Genera Insectorum ed. Wytsman, P., I. Gyrinidae. V. Vertemeol and L. Desmet, Brussels. 13 pp.
- 1903. Coléoptères aquatiques (Haliplidae, Dytiscidae, Gyrinidae et Hydrophilidae) recueillis dans le sud de Madagascar par M. Ch. Alluaud (juillet 1900-mai 1901). Ann. Soc. Entomol. France 72:1-51.
- 1906. Voyage de M. Ch. Alluaud dans l'Afrique Orientale: Dytiscidae, Gyrinidae, Hydrophilidae [includes Haliplidae]. Ann. Soc. Entomol. France 75:235-278.

== Collection ==
Regimbart's collection is in the Muséum national d'histoire naturelle in Paris.
