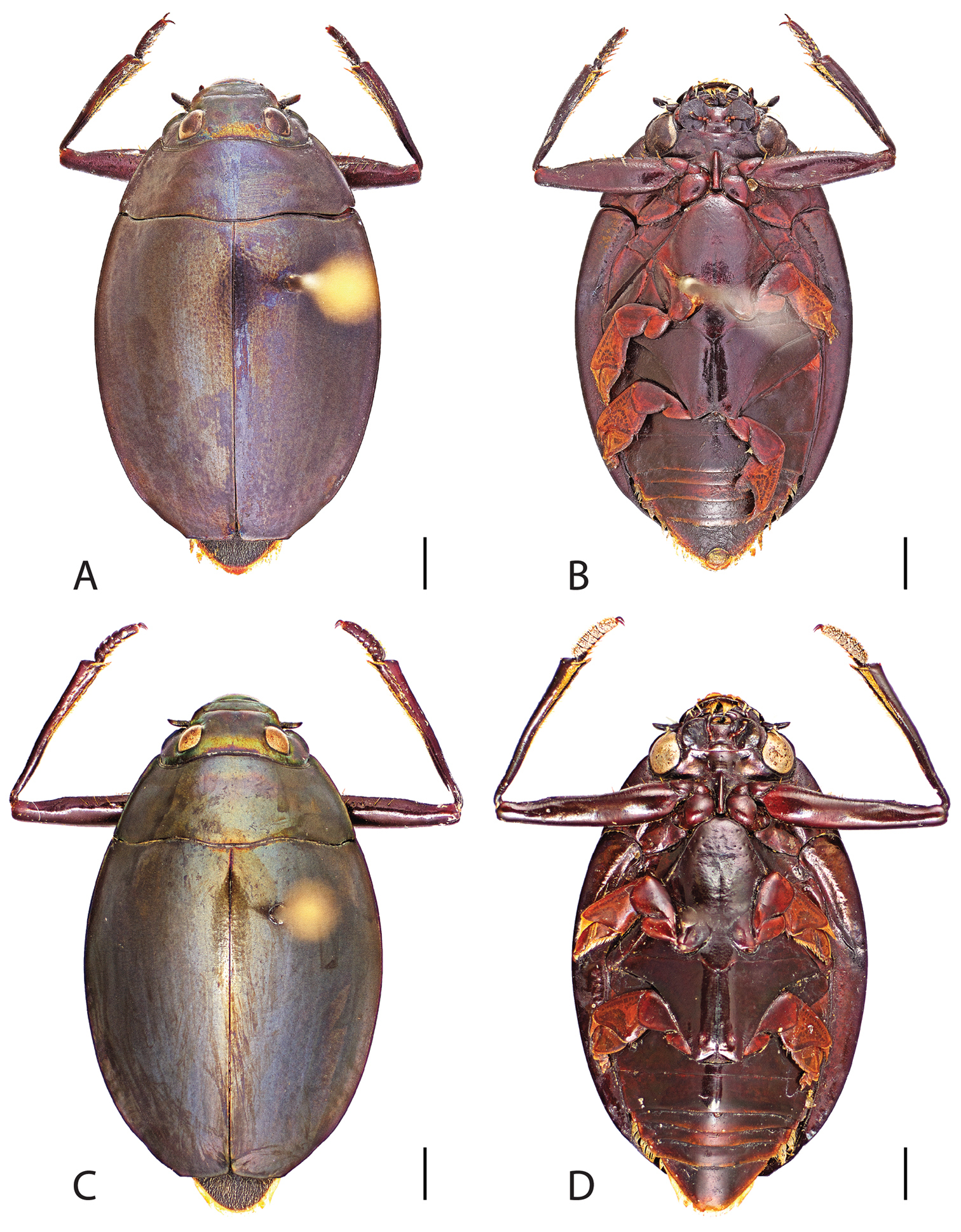

Scientific classification
- Kingdom: Animalia
- Phylum: Arthropoda
- Clade: Pancrustacea
- Class: Insecta
- Order: Coleoptera
- Suborder: Adephaga
- Family: Gyrinidae
- Genus: Dineutus
- Species: D. mexicanus

Binomial name
- Dineutus mexicanus Ochs, 1925

Synonyms
- Dineutus truncatus mexicanus Ochs, 1925

= Dineutus mexicanus =

Species of beetle

Dineutus mexicanus is a species of whirligig beetle in the family Gyrinidae. This species is found from Mexico to El Salvador.
