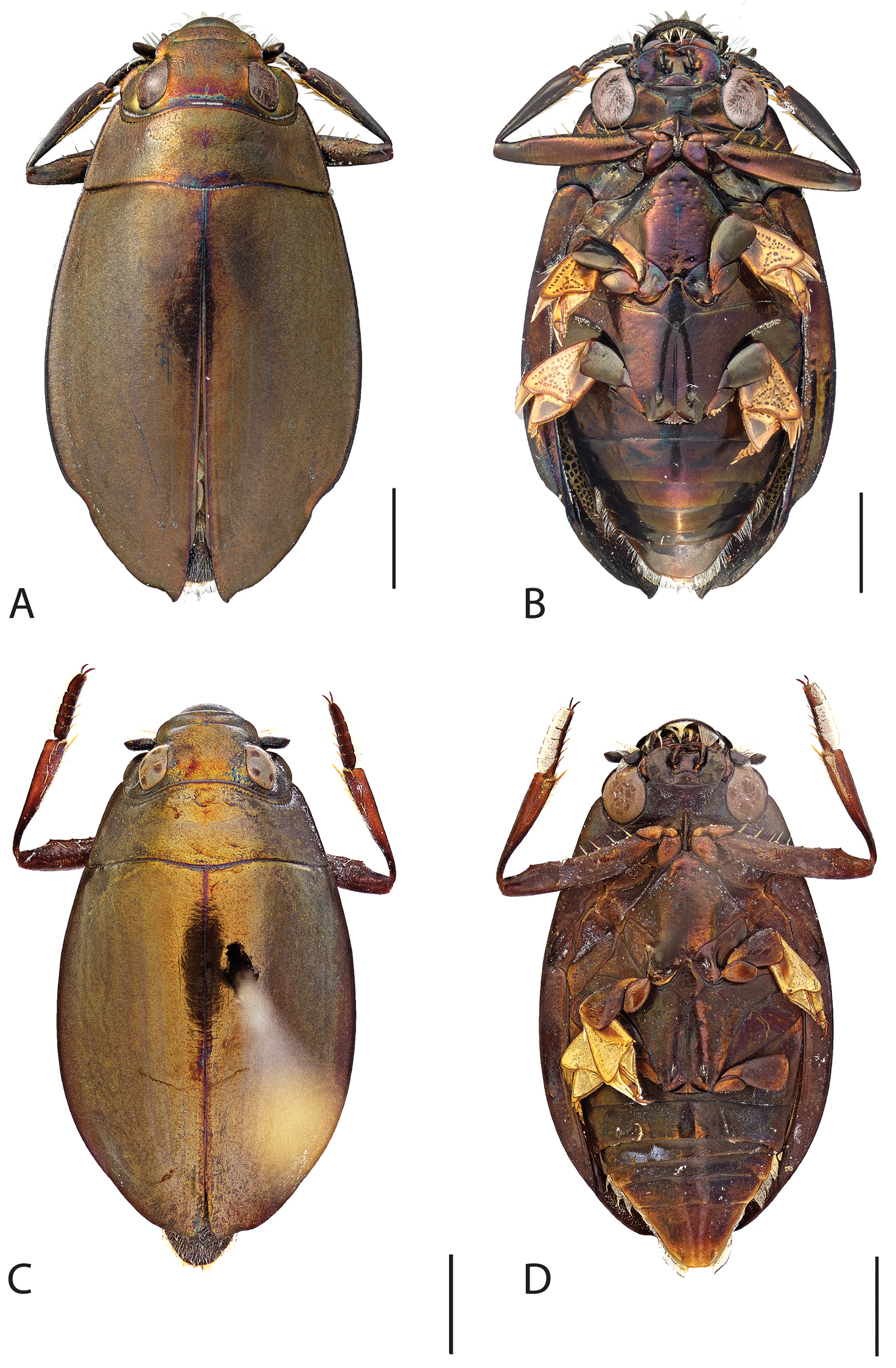

Scientific classification
- Kingdom: Animalia
- Phylum: Arthropoda
- Clade: Pancrustacea
- Class: Insecta
- Order: Coleoptera
- Suborder: Adephaga
- Family: Gyrinidae
- Genus: Dineutus
- Species: D. productus

Binomial name
- Dineutus productus Roberts, 1895

= Dineutus productus =

Species of beetle

Dineutus productus is a species of whirligig beetle in the family Gyrinidae. It is found in North America.
