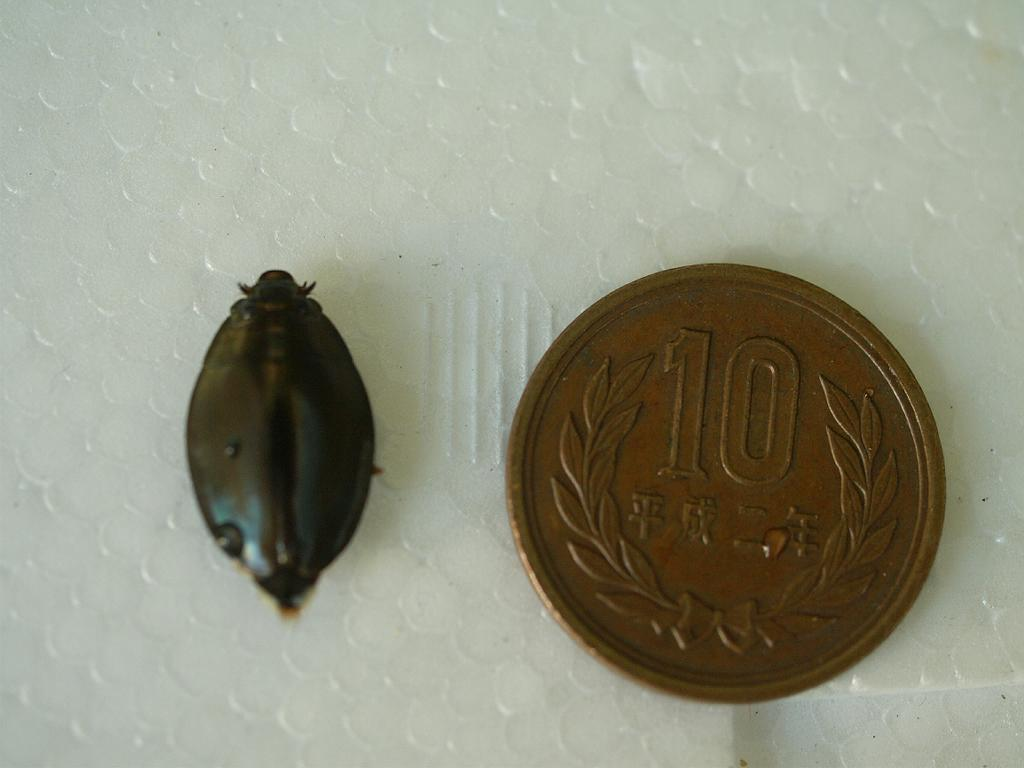

Scientific classification
- Kingdom: Animalia
- Phylum: Arthropoda
- Clade: Pancrustacea
- Class: Insecta
- Order: Coleoptera
- Suborder: Adephaga
- Family: Gyrinidae
- Genus: Dineutus
- Species: D. mellyi

Binomial name
- Dineutus mellyi Regimbart, 1882

Synonyms
- Dineutus sauteri Uyttenboogaart, 1915

= Dineutus mellyi =

Species of beetle

Dineutus mellyi is a species of whirligig beetle in the family Gyrinidae. This species is found in China and Taiwan.

== Subspecies ==
- Dineutus mellyi mellyi (China, Taiwan)
- Dineutus mellyi insularis Régimbart, 1907 (Japan: Ryukyus)
