= Dineutus shorti =

Scientific classification
- Kingdom: Animalia
- Phylum: Arthropoda
- Clade: Pancrustacea
- Class: Insecta
- Order: Coleoptera
- Suborder: Adephaga
- Family: Gyrinidae
- Genus: Dineutus
- Species: D. shorti

Binomial name
- Dineutus shorti Gustafson and Sites, 2015

Species of beetle

Dineutus shorti is a species of whirligig beetle in the family Gyrinidae. It is known only from a narrow section of the coastal plain in the Blackwater and Pensacola river watersheds of Santa Rosa and Okaloosa counties, Florida and Covington County, Alabama in the United States.

The species is named for aquatic coleopterist for Andrew E. Z. Short.
