= Dineutus grandis =

Scientific classification
- Kingdom: Animalia
- Phylum: Arthropoda
- Clade: Pancrustacea
- Class: Insecta
- Order: Coleoptera
- Suborder: Adephaga
- Family: Gyrinidae
- Genus: Dineutus
- Species: D. grandis

Binomial name
- Dineutus grandis (Klug, 1834)

Synonyms
- Gyrinus grandis Klug, 1834; Gyrinus kaiseri Stierlin, 1888; Gyrinus maculatus Pic, 1909; Gyrinus varians Laporte, 1840

Species of beetle

Dineutus grandis is a species of whirligig beetle in the family Gyrinidae. This species is found in Egypt, Saudi Arabia, Yemen and Africa.
