= Dineutus arabicus =

Scientific classification
- Kingdom: Animalia
- Phylum: Arthropoda
- Clade: Pancrustacea
- Class: Insecta
- Order: Coleoptera
- Suborder: Adephaga
- Family: Gyrinidae
- Genus: Dineutus
- Species: D. arabicus

Binomial name
- Dineutus arabicus Régimbart, 1907

Species of beetle

Dineutus arabicus is a species of whirligig beetle in the family Gyrinidae. This species is found in Yemen.
