= Dineutus subspinosus =

Scientific classification
- Kingdom: Animalia
- Phylum: Arthropoda
- Clade: Pancrustacea
- Class: Insecta
- Order: Coleoptera
- Suborder: Adephaga
- Family: Gyrinidae
- Genus: Dineutus
- Species: D. subspinosus

Binomial name
- Dineutus subspinosus (Klug, 1834)

Synonyms
- Gyrinus subspinosus Klug, 1834; Dineutus armatus Wollaston, 1867; Dineutus notatipennis Pic, 1909

Species of beetle

Dineutus subspinosus is a species of whirligig beetle in the family Gyrinidae. This species is found in Africa, from South Africa (Mpumalanga, Northern Province) to Zimbabwe, Botswana and Namibia northwards to Egypt, as well as in Oman and Yemen.
