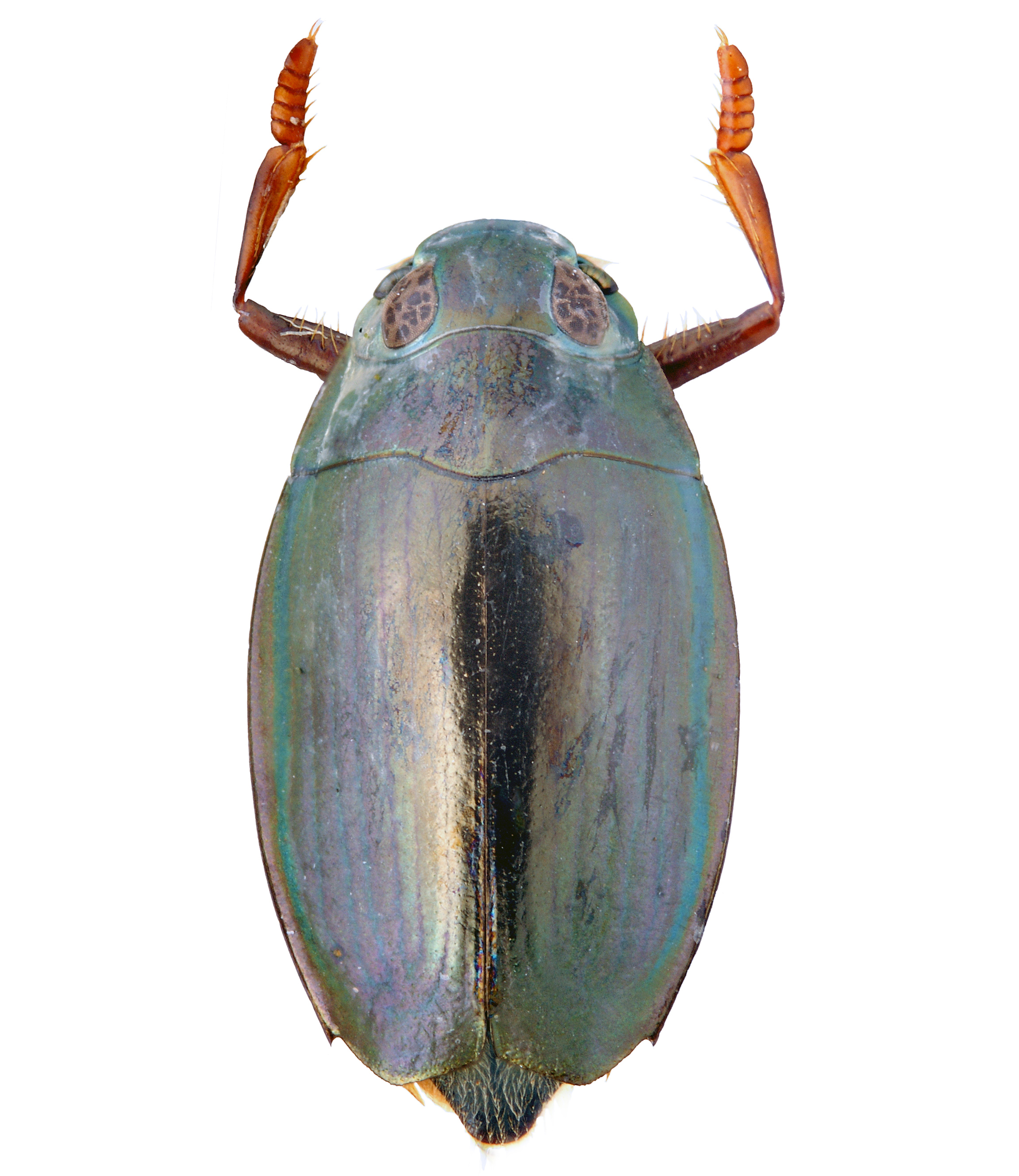
- Dineutus australis

Scientific classification
- Kingdom: Animalia
- Phylum: Arthropoda
- Class: Insecta
- Order: Coleoptera
- Suborder: Adephaga
- Family: Gyrinidae
- Subfamily: Gyrininae
- Tribe: Dineutini
- Genus: Dineutus; Macleay, 1825

Synonyms
- Necticus Laporte, 1835; Dineutes Régimbart, 1882; Dineutes Cuvier, 1832 [Aponym]; Dyneutes Laporte, 1835 [Aponym]

= Dineutus =

Genus of beetles

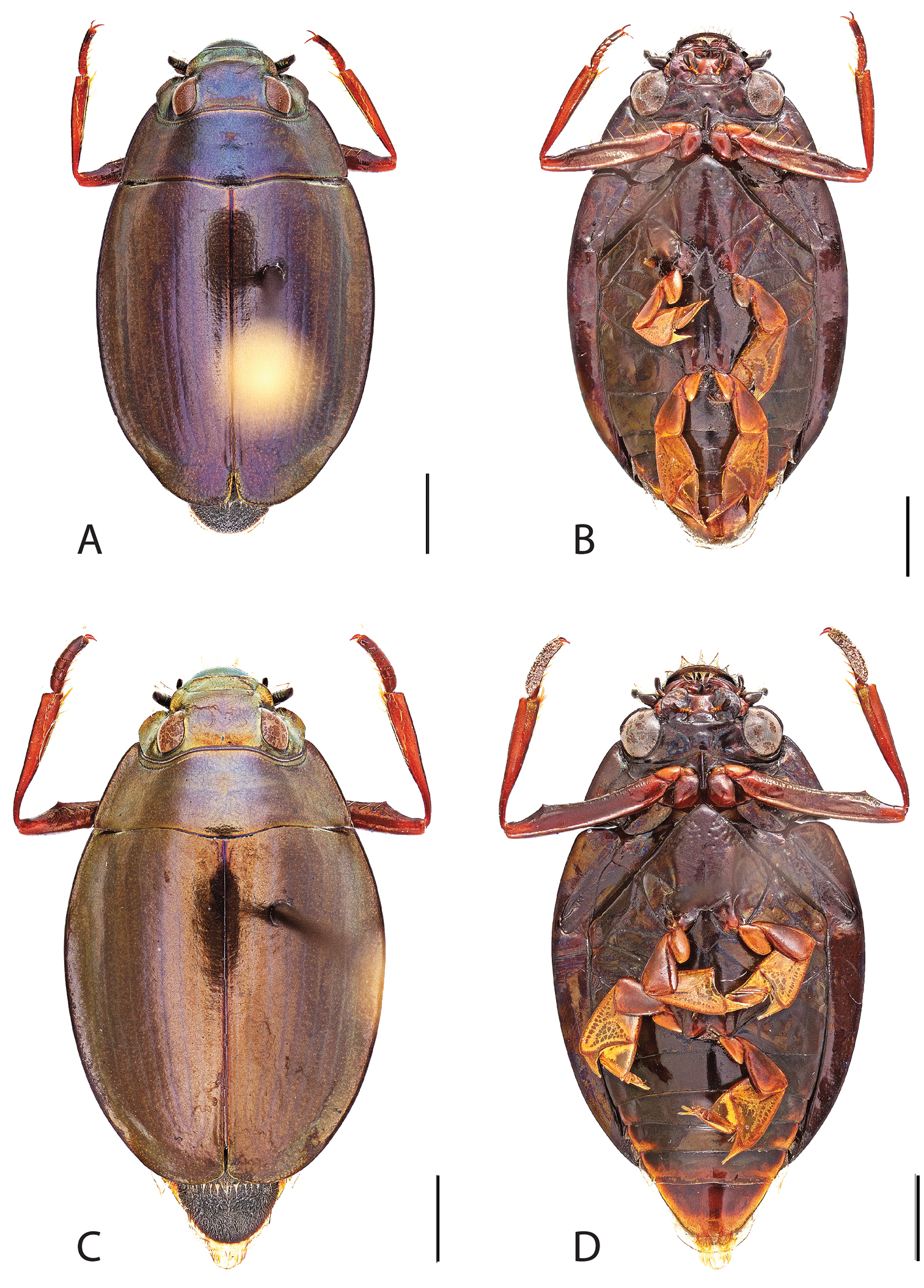
Dineutus emarginatus female (top) and male (bottom)

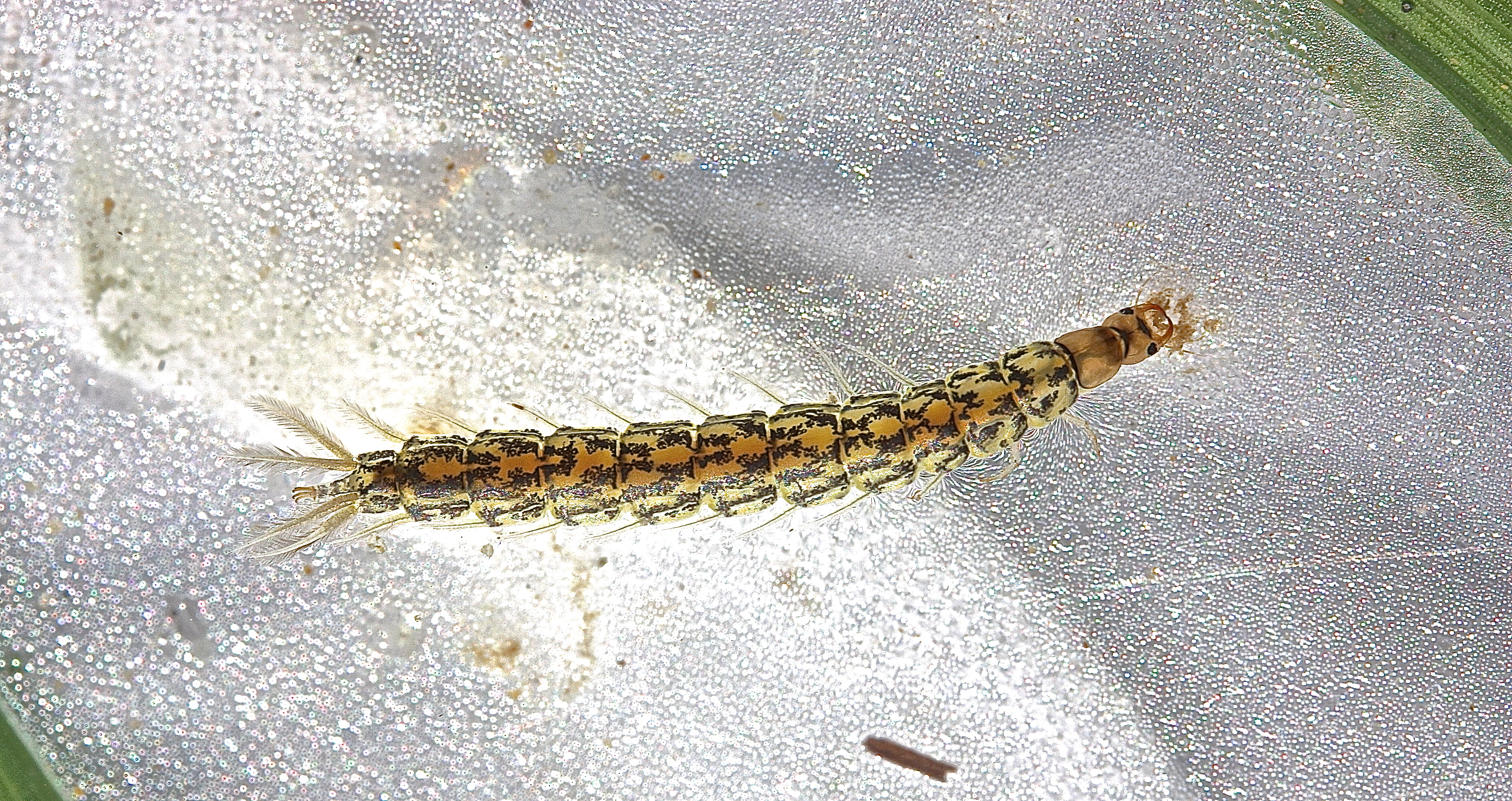
Dineutus sp. larva

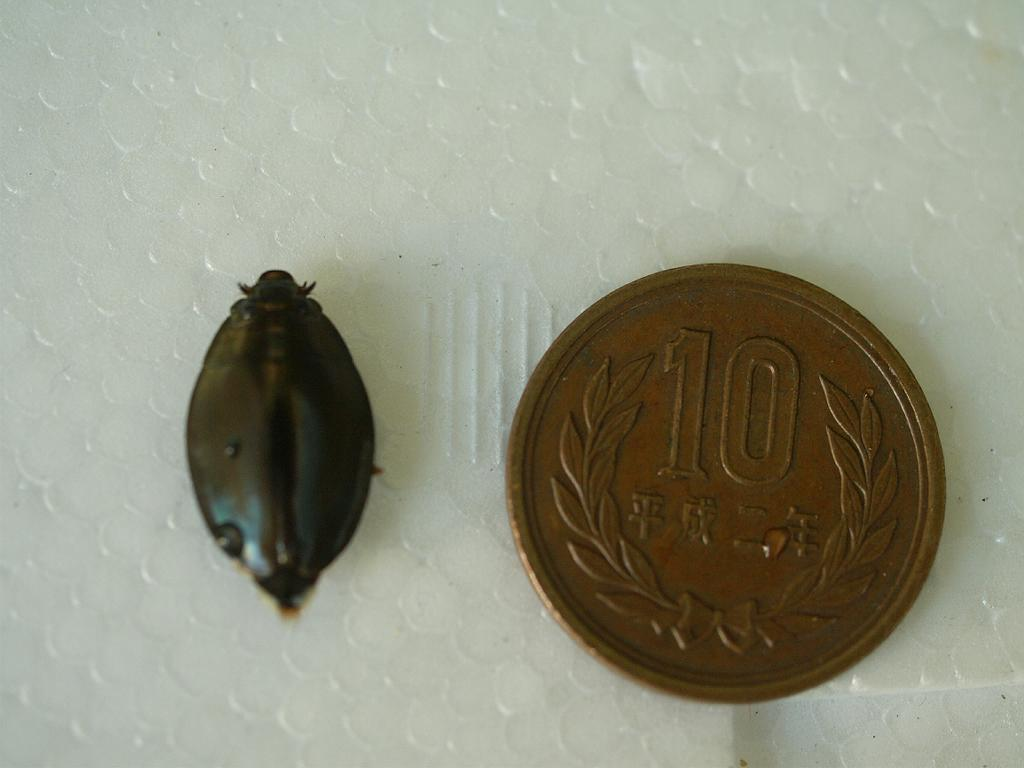
Dineutus mellyi

Dineutus is a genus of beetles in the family Gyrinidae, the whirligig beetles. They are 9 to 15 millimeters long. Their elytra are smooth, shallowly lined, or grooved.

Species include:

- Dineutus abyssinicus Régimbart, 1883
- Dineutus aegyptiacus (Dejean, 1836)
- Dineutus aereus (Klug in Ehrenberg, 1834)
- Dineutus amazonicus Hatch, 1930
- Dineutus americanus (Linnaeus, 1767)
- Dineutus analis Régimbart, 1883
- Dineutus angustus LeConte, 1878
- Dineutus arabicus Régimbart, 1907
- Dineutus archboldianus Ochs, 1955
- Dineutus assimilis Kirby, 1837
- Dineutus australis (Fabricius, 1775)
- Dineutus bechynei Ochs, 1958
- Dineutus brevis (Sturm, 1843)
- Dineutus buergersi Ochs, 1955
- Dineutus bufo Brinck, 1976
- Dineutus carolinus LeConte, 1868
- Dineutus cephalotes (Dejean, 1833)
- Dineutus chalybaeus Zimmermann, 1924
- Dineutus choiseulicola Brinck, 1976
- Dineutus ciliatus Forsberg, 1821
- Dineutus comma (Thunberg, 1781)
- Dineutus congolensis Ochs, 1937
- Dineutus cribratus Régimbart, 1886
- Dineutus cristobalensis Brinck, 1976
- Dineutus discolor Aubé, 1838
- Dineutus dispar Ochs, 1954
- Dineutus dispersus Brinck, 1976
- Dineutus dunkeri Zimmermann, 1920
- Dineutus eccentricus Mouchamps, 1956
- Dineutus emarginatus (Say, 1823)
- Dineutus fairmairei Régimbart, 1883
- Dineutus fauveli Régimbart, 1884
- Dineutus freyi Ochs, 1954
- Dineutus gondaricus Reiche, 1847
- Dineutus gouldi Hope, 1842
- Dineutus grandis (Klug in Ehrenberg, 1834)
- Dineutus grossus (Modeer, 1776)
- Dineutus helleri Ochs, 1925
- Dineutus heterandrus Ochs, 1937
- Dineutus heurni Zimmermann, 1924
- Dineutus hornii Roberts, 1895
- Dineutus impiger Guignot, 1947
- Dineutus indicans Walker, 1858
- Dineutus indicus Aubé, 1838
- Dineutus indus (Fabricius, 1798)
- Dineutus insignis Heer, 1862
- Dineutus iridescens Kirsch, 1865
- Dineutus jikeli Schaufuss, 1890
- Dineutus kuntzeni Ochs, 1924
- Dineutus lateristriatus (Sturm, 1843)
- Dineutus lethicus Guignot, 1957
- Dineutus longimanus Olivier, 1795
- Dineutus longiventris Heer, 1862
- Dineutus loriae Régimbart, 1899
- Dineutus macrochirus Régimbart, 1899
- Dineutus major (Dejean, 1833)
- Dineutus mellyi Régimbart, 1883
- Dineutus mesosternalis Régimbart, 1907
- Dineutus metallicus (Dejean, 1833)
- Dineutus mexicanus Ochs, 1925
- Dineutus micans (Fabricius, 1792)
- Dineutus mucronatus (Sturm, 1843)
- Dineutus neobritannicus Ochs, 1925
- Dineutus neoguineensis Régimbart, 1892
- Dineutus neohollandicus Ochs, 1926
- Dineutus nigrior Roberts, 1895
- Dineutus orientalis (Modeer, 1776)
- Dineutus pagdeni Ochs, 1937
- Dineutus pauliani Guignot, 1942
- Dineutus pectoralis Régimbart, 1882
- Dineutus picipes Waterhouse, 1876
- Dineutus politus Macleay, 1825
- Dineutus productus Roberts, 1895
- Dineutus proximus (Dejean, 1836)
- Dineutus proximus Aubé, 1838
- Dineutus punctatus Aubé, 1838
- Dineutus punctulatus (Dejean, 1833)
- Dineutus regimbarti Régimbart, 1882
- Dineutus ritsemae Régimbart, 1882
- Dineutus robertsi Leng, 1911
- Dineutus rossi Ochs, 1933
- Dineutus rufipes (Dejean, 1833)
- Dineutus serrulatus LeConte, 1868
- Dineutus sharpi Régimbart, 1883
- Dineutus shorti Gustafson and Sites, 2016
- Dineutus simmondsi Ochs, 1927
- Dineutus sinensis Feng, 1935
- Dineutus sinuaticollis Zimmermann, 1924
- Dineutus sinuosipennis Laporte de Castelnau, 1840
- Dineutus solitarius Aubé, 1838
- Dineutus spinosus Fabricius, 1781
- Dineutus staudingeri Ochs, 1924
- Dineutus striatus Zimmermann, 1916
- Dineutus sublineatus (Chevrolat, 1833)
- Dineutus subspinosus (Klug in Ehrenberg, 1834)
- Dineutus sumbaensis (Ochs, 1953)
- Dineutus tetracanthus Régimbart, 1917
- Dineutus truncatus Sharp, 1873
- Dineutus unicolor Ochs, 1960
- Dineutus unidentatus Aubé, 1838
- Dineutus varians (Dejean, 1833)
- Dineutus violaceus Ochs, 1955
- Dineutus virescens Ochs, 1955
- Dineutus wehnckei Régimbart, 1883
- Dineutus wittei Ochs, 1933
