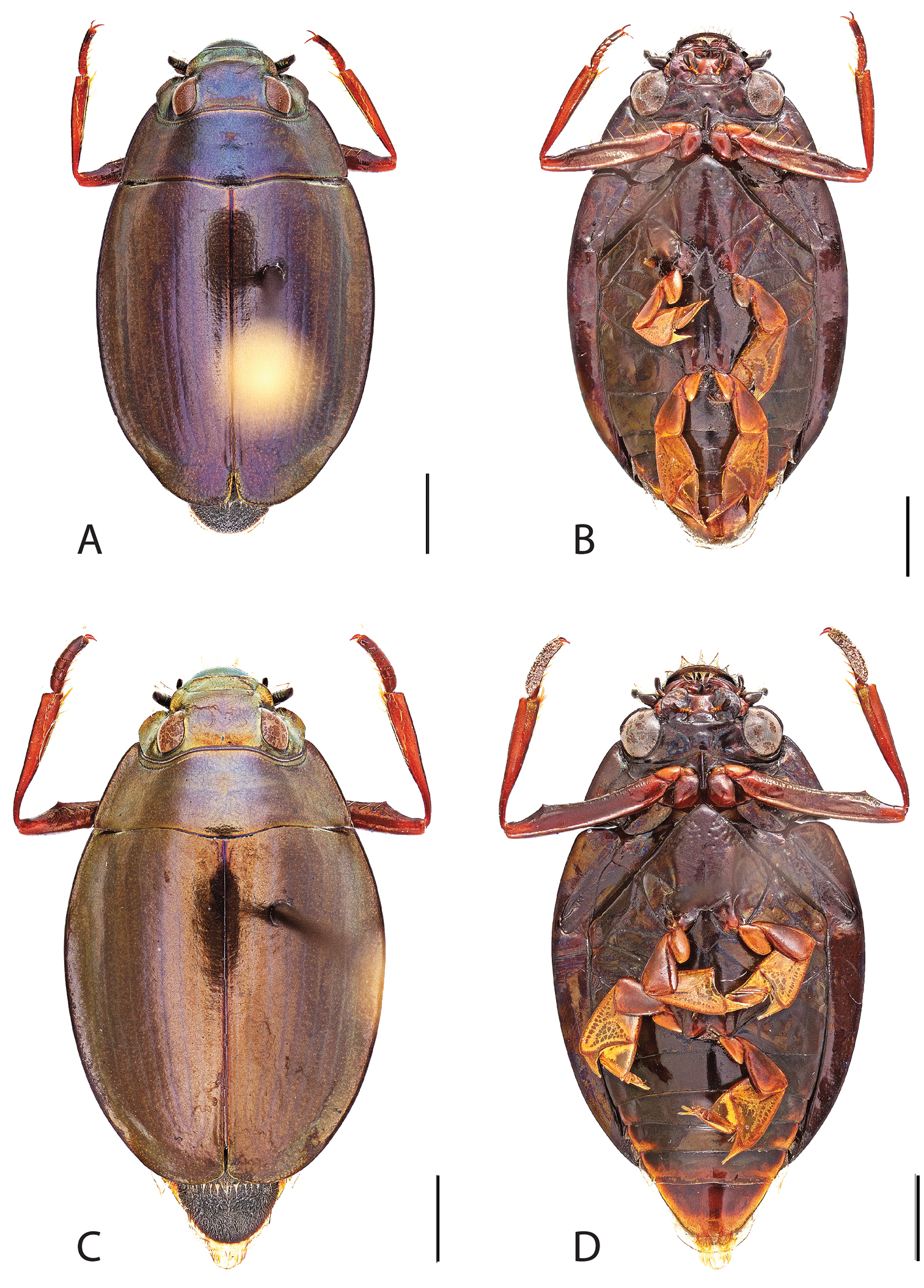

Scientific classification
- Kingdom: Animalia
- Phylum: Arthropoda
- Clade: Pancrustacea
- Class: Insecta
- Order: Coleoptera
- Suborder: Adephaga
- Family: Gyrinidae
- Genus: Dineutus
- Species: D. emarginatus

Binomial name
- Dineutus emarginatus (Say, 1823)

Synonyms
- Dineutus emarginatus floridensis Ochs, 1929

= Dineutus emarginatus =

Species of beetle

Dineutus emarginatus is a species of whirligig beetle in the family Gyrinidae. It is found in North America.
