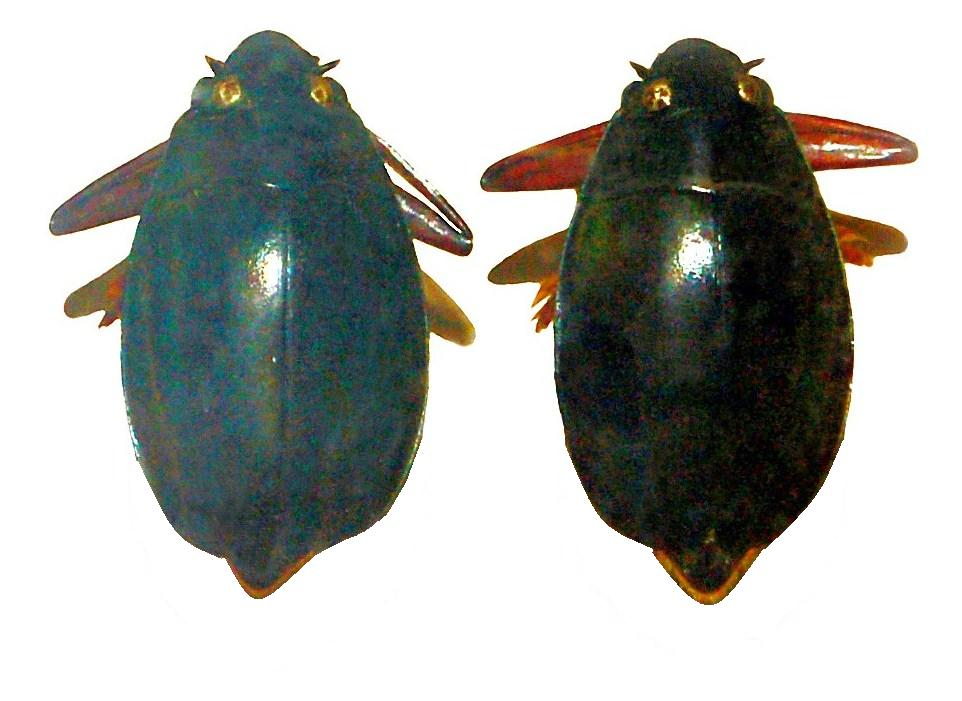
- Dineutus loriae from New Guinea

Scientific classification
- Kingdom: Animalia
- Phylum: Arthropoda
- Clade: Pancrustacea
- Class: Insecta
- Order: Coleoptera
- Suborder: Adephaga
- Family: Gyrinidae
- Genus: Dineutus
- Species: D. loriae

Binomial name
- Dineutus loriae Régimbart, 1899

Synonyms
- Dineutes loriae

= Dineutus loriae =

Species of beetle

Dineutus loriae is a species of beetle within the family of whirligig beetles, or Gyrinidae. The species name loriae honors the Italian explorer Lamberto Loria (1855–1913). This beetle can reach a length of about 20 mm.

== Bibliography ==
- Polhemus, D.A. 2011. New distributional records for Gyrinidae (Insecta: Coleoptera) on New Guinea and nearby islands, with a checklist of the New Guinea species. Zootaxa 2900: 51-68.
- Dan A. Polhemus, Ronald A. Englund, Gerald R. Allen Freshwater Biotas of New Guinea and Nearby Islands
- Media related to Dineutus loriae at Wikimedia Commons
- Data related to Dineutus loriae at Wikispecies
