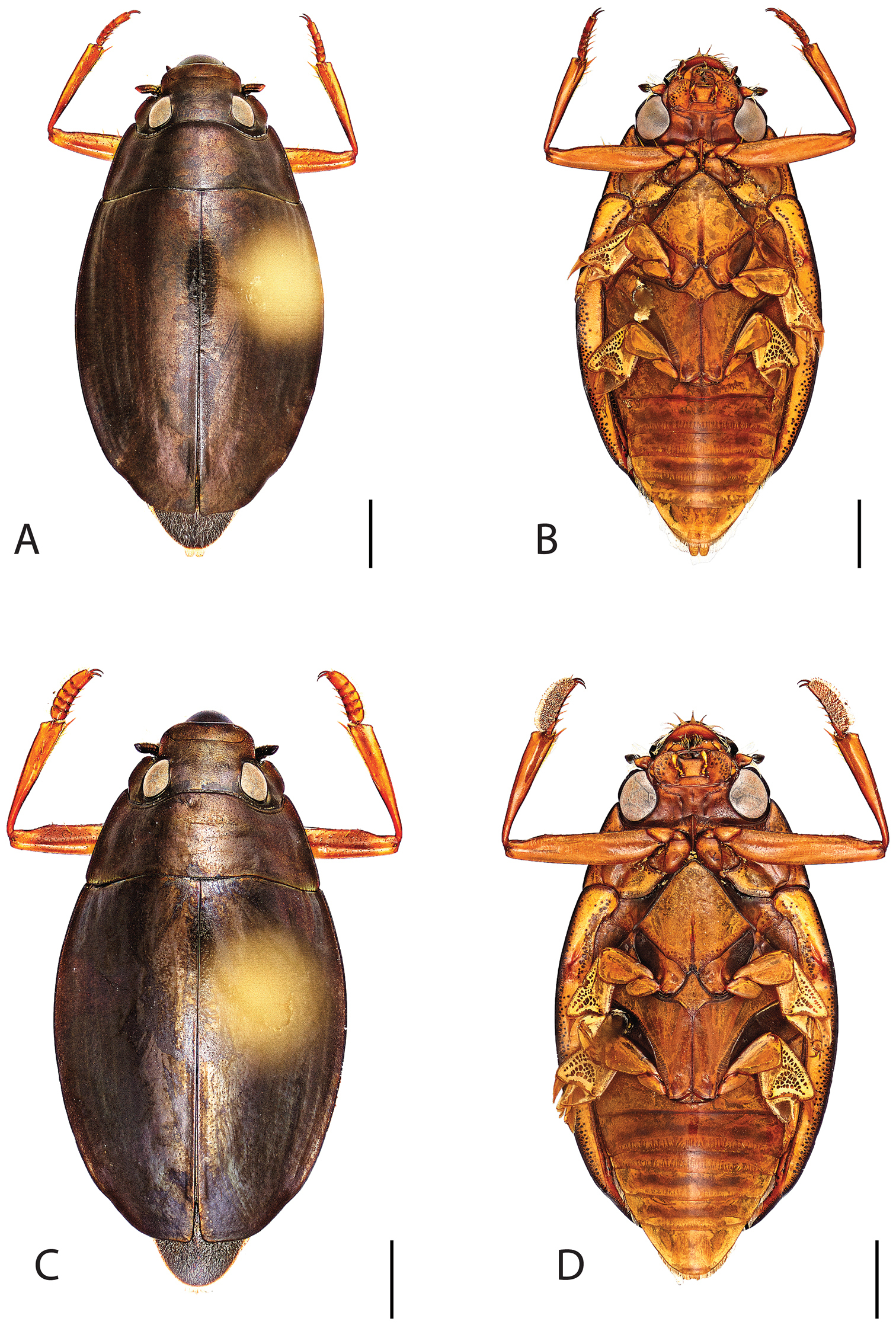

Scientific classification
- Kingdom: Animalia
- Phylum: Arthropoda
- Clade: Pancrustacea
- Class: Insecta
- Order: Coleoptera
- Suborder: Adephaga
- Family: Gyrinidae
- Genus: Dineutus
- Species: D. discolor

Binomial name
- Dineutus discolor Aube, 1838

Synonyms
- Cyclous labratus Melsheimer, 1846

= Dineutus discolor =

Species of beetle

Dineutus discolor, the large whirligig beetle, is a species of whirligig beetle in the family Gyrinidae. It is found in Central America and North America.
