= Dineutus fauveli =

Scientific classification
- Kingdom: Animalia
- Phylum: Arthropoda
- Clade: Pancrustacea
- Class: Insecta
- Order: Coleoptera
- Suborder: Adephaga
- Family: Gyrinidae
- Genus: Dineutus
- Species: D. fauveli

Binomial name
- Dineutus fauveli Regimbart, 1884

Species of beetle

Dineutus fauveli is a species of whirligig beetle in the family Gyrinidae. This species is found from Namibia northwards.
