= Dineutus punctatus =

Scientific classification
- Kingdom: Animalia
- Phylum: Arthropoda
- Clade: Pancrustacea
- Class: Insecta
- Order: Coleoptera
- Suborder: Adephaga
- Family: Gyrinidae
- Genus: Dineutus
- Species: D. punctatus

Binomial name
- Dineutus punctatus Aube, 1838

Species of beetle

Dineutus punctatus is a species of whirligig beetle in the family Gyrinidae. This species is found from South Africa (Western Cape, Eastern Cape, Free State, KwaZulu-Natal, Mpumalanga, Gauteng, Northwest Province) to Zimbabwe.
