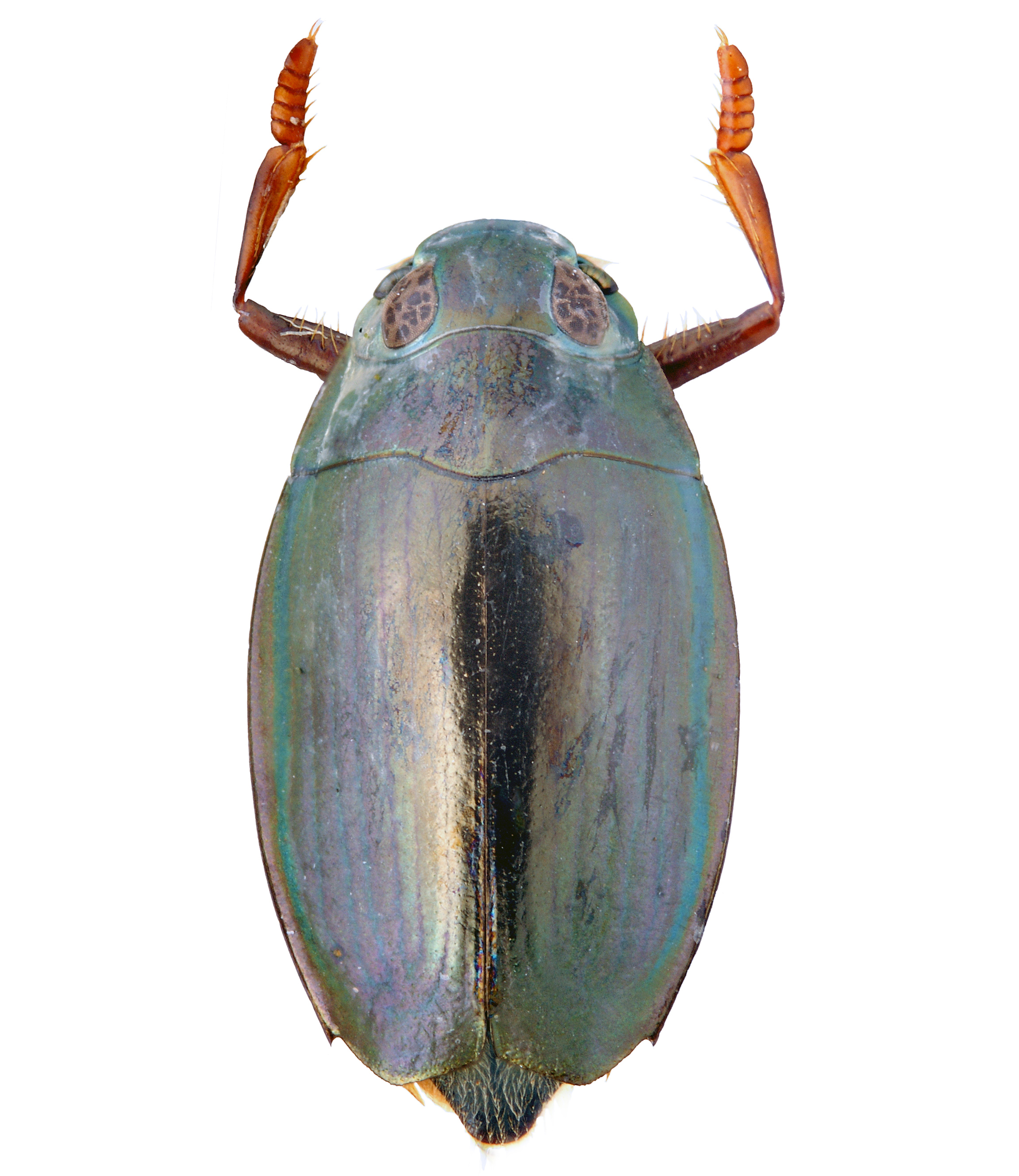

Scientific classification
- Kingdom: Animalia
- Phylum: Arthropoda
- Clade: Pancrustacea
- Class: Insecta
- Order: Coleoptera
- Suborder: Adephaga
- Family: Gyrinidae
- Genus: Dineutus
- Species: D. australis

Binomial name
- Dineutus australis (Fabricius, 1775)

Synonyms
- Gyrinus australis Fabricius, 1775; Dineutus leucopoda Montrouzier, 1860; Dineutus dentatus Suffrian, 1842; Gyrinus dentipennis W.S. Macleay, 1825; Gyrinus iridis Hope, 1842a; Gyrinus iridis Hope, 1842b; Dineutus janthinus Blanchard, 1843; Gyrinus limbatus W.S. Macleay, 1825; Gyrinus rufipes Fabricius, 1801

= Dineutus australis =

Species of beetle

Dineutus australis is a species of whirligig beetle in the family Gyrinidae. This species is widespread.

== Subspecies ==
- Dineutus australis australis (China, Australia, Oriental Region)
- Dineutus australis australis tokunoshimanus Satô, 1962 (Japan: Ryukyus)
