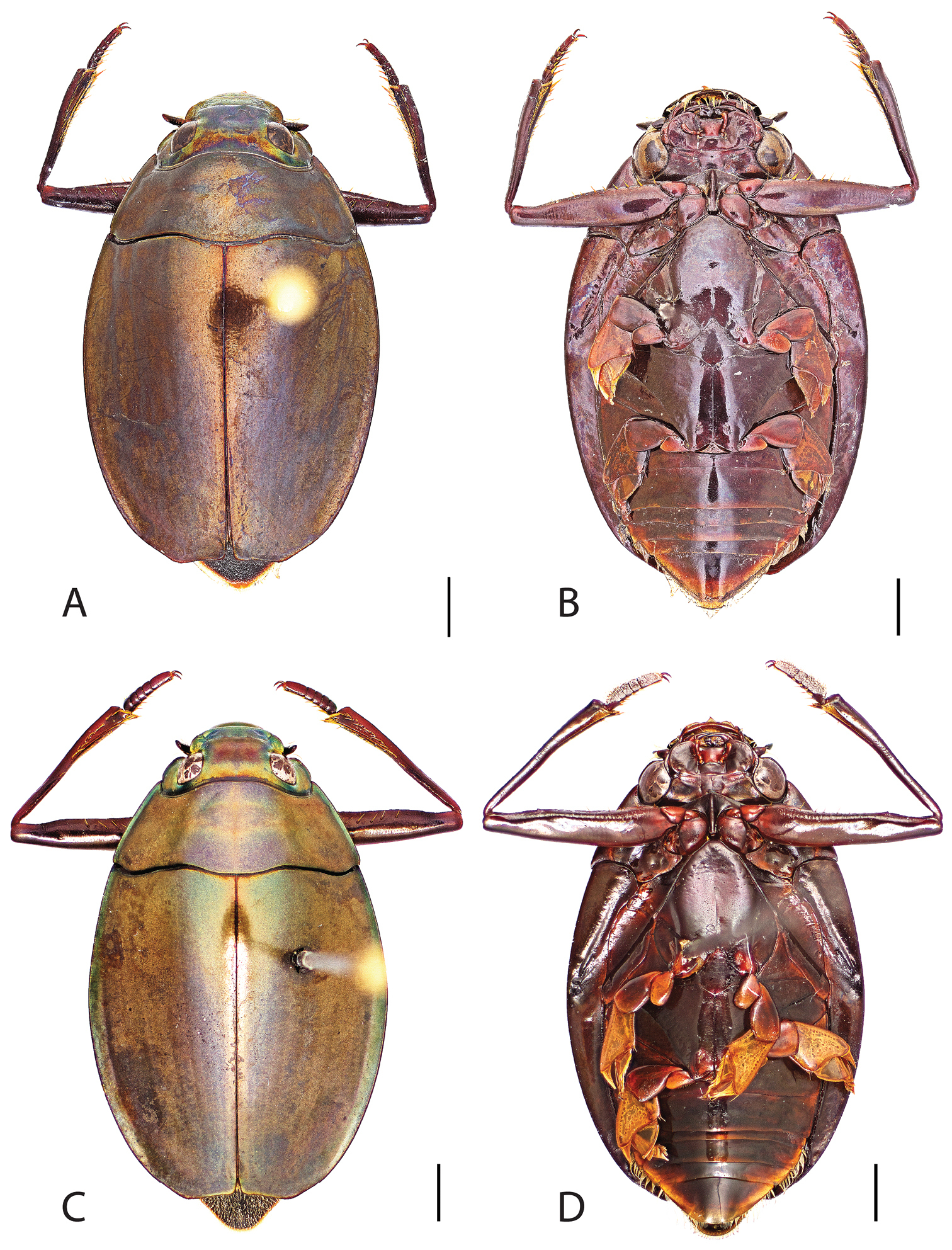

Scientific classification
- Kingdom: Animalia
- Phylum: Arthropoda
- Clade: Pancrustacea
- Class: Insecta
- Order: Coleoptera
- Suborder: Adephaga
- Family: Gyrinidae
- Genus: Dineutus
- Species: D. truncatus

Binomial name
- Dineutus truncatus Sharp, 1873

= Dineutus truncatus =

Species of beetle

Dineutus truncatus is a species of whirligig beetle in the family Gyrinidae. This species is found from Nicaragua to western Panama.
