= Dineutus spinosus =

Scientific classification
- Kingdom: Animalia
- Phylum: Arthropoda
- Clade: Pancrustacea
- Class: Insecta
- Order: Coleoptera
- Suborder: Adephaga
- Family: Gyrinidae
- Genus: Dineutus
- Species: D. spinosus

Binomial name
- Dineutus spinosus (Fabricius, 1781)

Synonyms
- Gyrinus spinosus Fabricius, 1781

Species of beetle

Dineutus spinosus is a species of whirligig beetle in the family Gyrinidae. This species is found in Pakistan, India, Nepal and the Oriental region.

== Subspecies ==
- Dineutus spinosus spinosus (Pakistan, India (Sikkim, Darjeeling, Uttarakhand , Uttar Pradesh), Oriental region)
- Dineutus spinosus nepalensis G. Ochs, 1929b (Nepal)
