= Dineutus orientalis =

Scientific classification
- Kingdom: Animalia
- Phylum: Arthropoda
- Clade: Pancrustacea
- Class: Insecta
- Order: Coleoptera
- Suborder: Adephaga
- Family: Gyrinidae
- Genus: Dineutus
- Species: D. orientalis

Binomial name
- Dineutus orientalis (Modeer, 1780)

Synonyms
- Gyrinus orientalis Modeer, 1780; Dineutes marginatus Sharp, 1873; Dineutes quadrispina Fairmaire in Deyrolle & Fairmaire, 1878

Species of beetle

Dineutus orientalis is a species of whirligig beetle in the family Gyrinidae. This species is found in China, Taiwan, Japan, North Korea and the Russian Far East.
