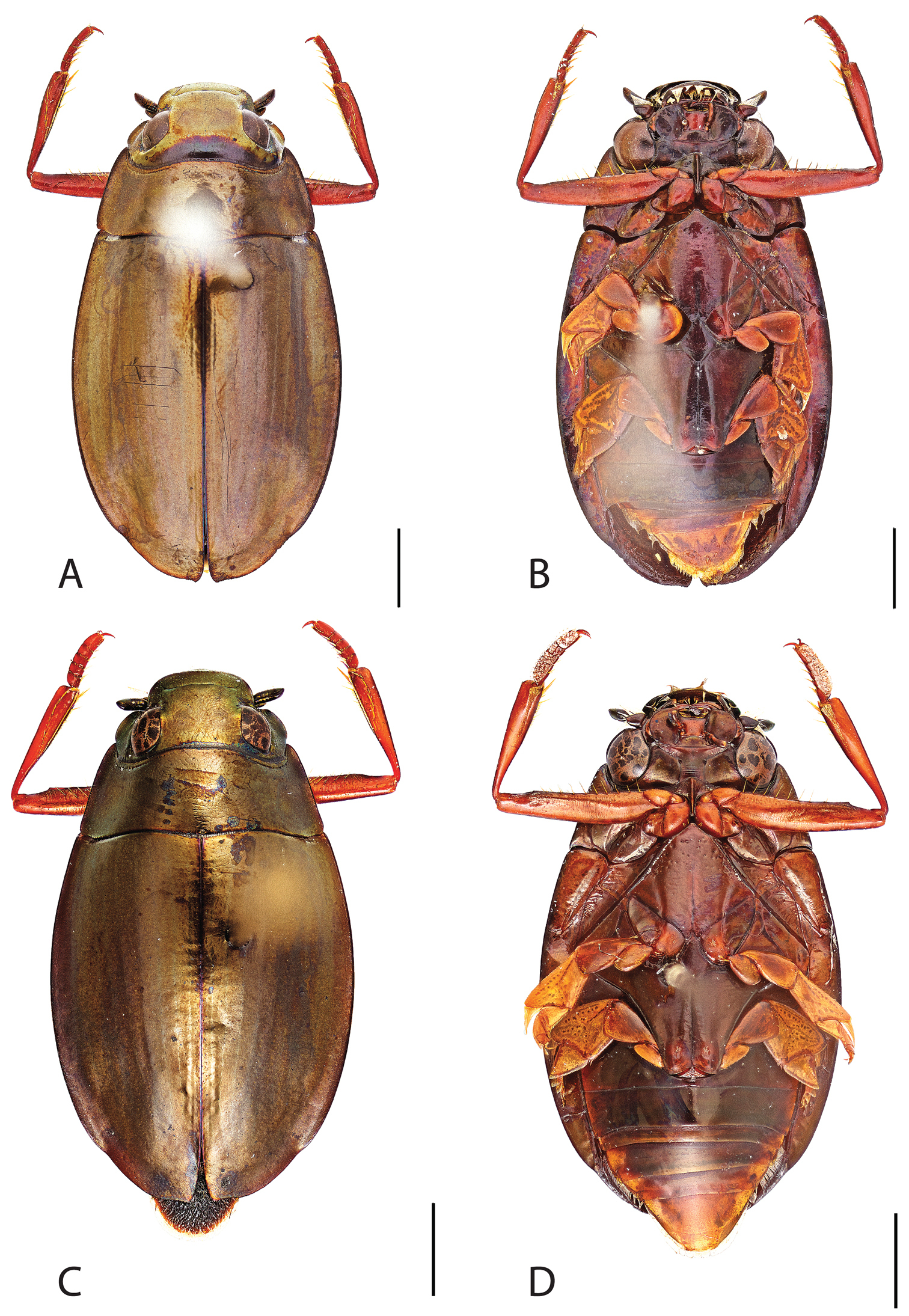

Scientific classification
- Kingdom: Animalia
- Phylum: Arthropoda
- Clade: Pancrustacea
- Class: Insecta
- Order: Coleoptera
- Suborder: Adephaga
- Family: Gyrinidae
- Genus: Dineutus
- Species: D. serrulatus

Binomial name
- Dineutus serrulatus LeConte, 1868

Synonyms
- Dineutes analis Régimbart 1883

= Dineutus serrulatus =

Species of beetle

Dineutus serrulatus is a species of whirligig beetle in the family Gyrinidae. This species is found in the Appalachian mountains of northeastern Georgia and the southwestern Carolinas.

== Subspecies ==
- Dineutus serrulatus serrulatus (Florida)
- Dineutus serrulatus analis Régimbart, 1883 (south-eastern United States)
