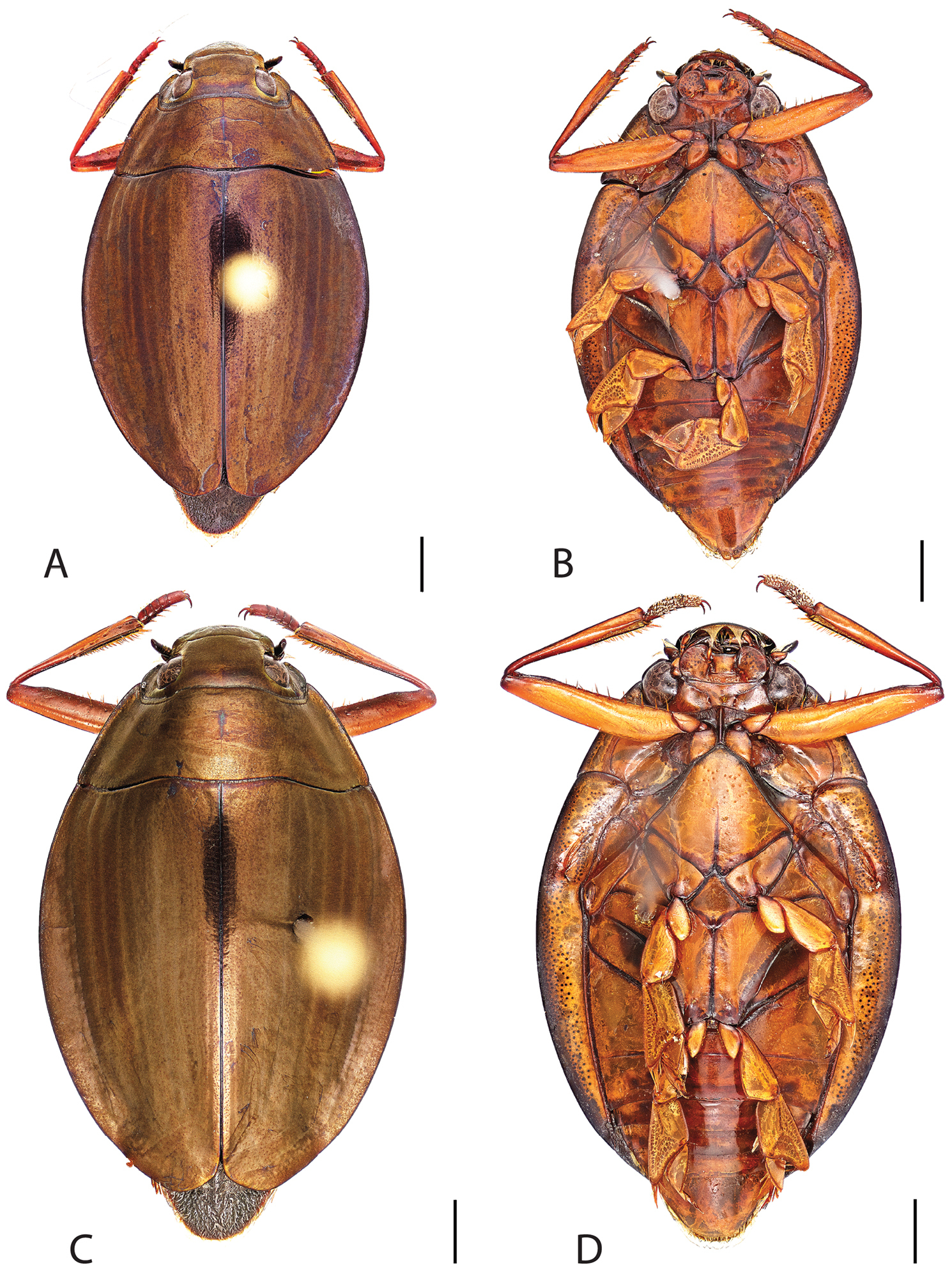

Scientific classification
- Kingdom: Animalia
- Phylum: Arthropoda
- Clade: Pancrustacea
- Class: Insecta
- Order: Coleoptera
- Suborder: Adephaga
- Family: Gyrinidae
- Genus: Dineutus
- Species: D. robertsi

Binomial name
- Dineutus robertsi Leng, 1911

= Dineutus robertsi =

Species of beetle

Dineutus robertsi is a species of whirligig beetle in the family Gyrinidae. This species is found in the Appalachian mountains of northeastern Georgia and the southwestern Carolinas.
