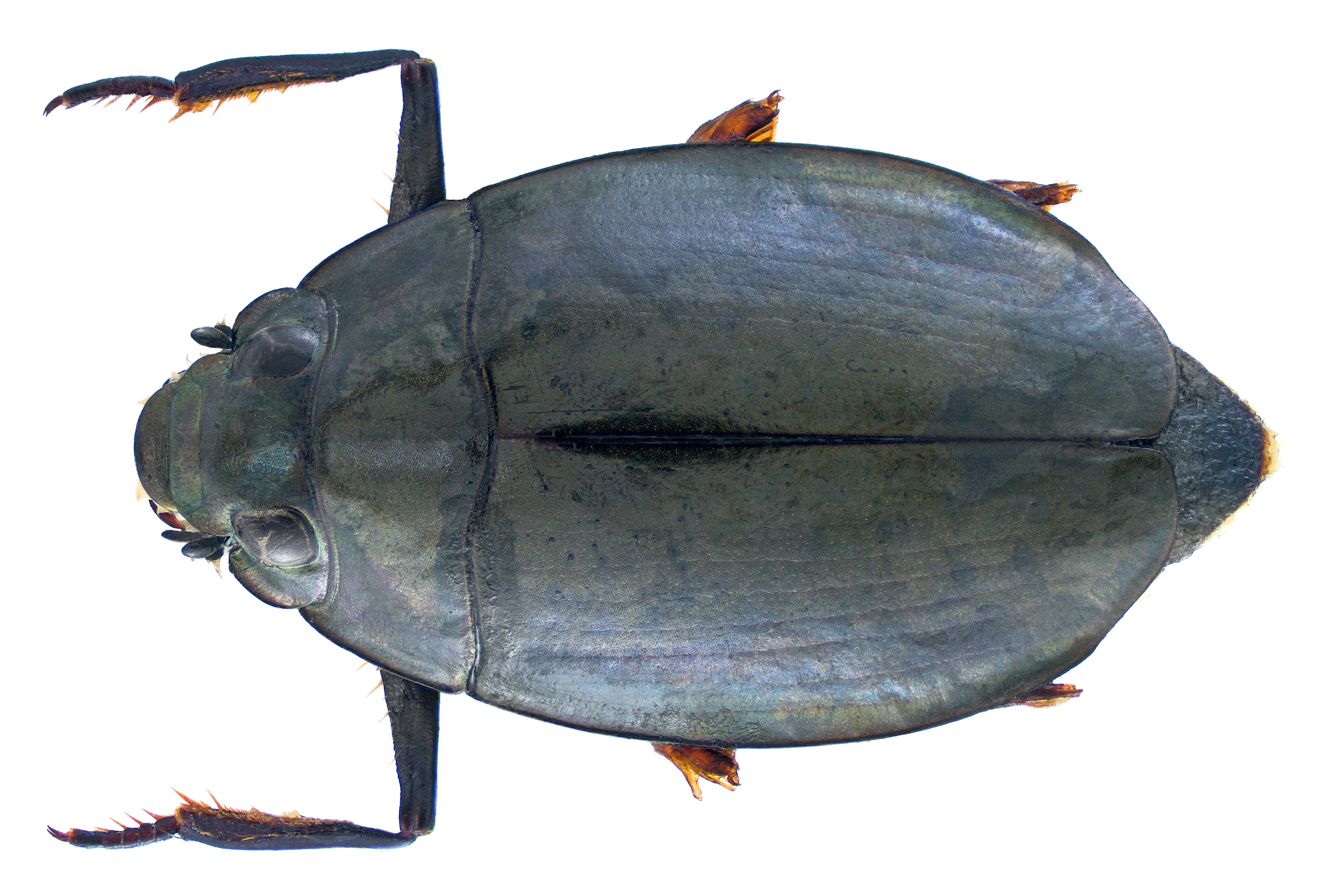

Scientific classification
- Kingdom: Animalia
- Phylum: Arthropoda
- Clade: Pancrustacea
- Class: Insecta
- Order: Coleoptera
- Suborder: Adephaga
- Family: Gyrinidae
- Genus: Dineutus
- Species: D. indicus

Binomial name
- Dineutus indicus Aubé, 1838

= Dineutus indicus =

Species of beetle

Dineutus indicus is a species of whirligig beetle in the family Gyrinidae. This species is widespread in Asia.

== Subspecies ==
- Dineutus indicus indicus (Iran, Kashmir, Nepal, India (Himachal Pradesh, Sikkim, Darjeeling District, Uttarakhand, Uttar Pradesh), Pakistan, as well as the Oriental Region)
- Dineutus indicus himalayensis Guignot 1945 (India: Arunachal Pradesh)
