= Dineutus micans =

Scientific classification
- Kingdom: Animalia
- Phylum: Arthropoda
- Clade: Pancrustacea
- Class: Insecta
- Order: Coleoptera
- Suborder: Adephaga
- Family: Gyrinidae
- Genus: Dineutus
- Species: D. micans

Binomial name
- Dineutus micans (Fabricius, 1792)

Synonyms
- Gyrinus micans Fabricius, 1792

Species of beetle

Dineutus micans is a species of whirligig beetle in the family Gyrinidae. This species is found in Africa.

== Subspecies ==
- Dineutus micans micans (countries along the northern shores of the Gulf of Guinea)
- Dineutus micans akka Ochs, 1928 (Congo)
- Dineutus micans rhodesianus Brink, 1955 (Zimbabwe)
- Dineutus micans serra Régimbart, 1907 (Congo, Angola)
- Dineutus micans subserratus Régimbart, 1904 (Cameroon)
