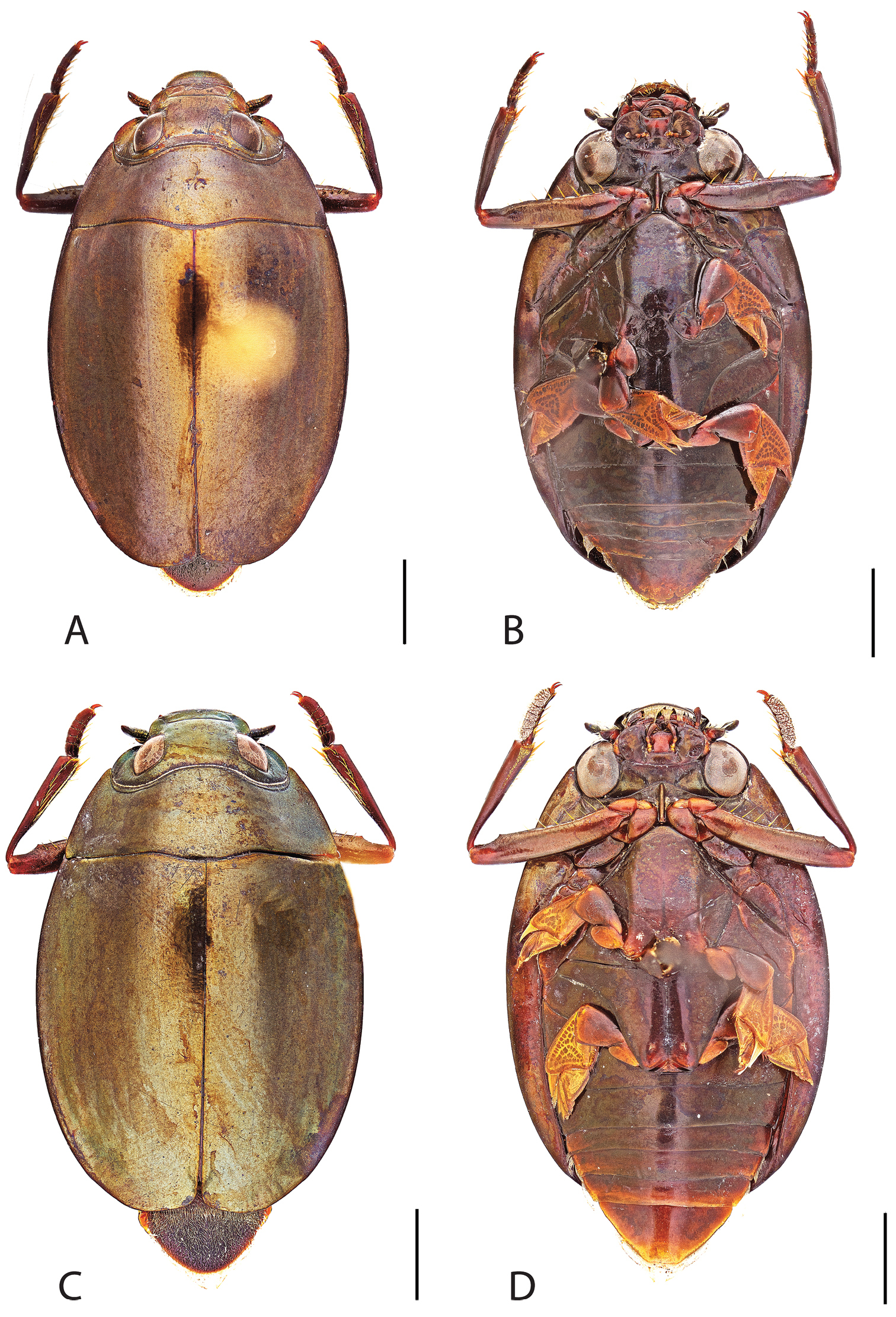

Scientific classification
- Kingdom: Animalia
- Phylum: Arthropoda
- Clade: Pancrustacea
- Class: Insecta
- Order: Coleoptera
- Suborder: Adephaga
- Family: Gyrinidae
- Genus: Dineutus
- Species: D. solitarius

Binomial name
- Dineutus solitarius Aubé, 1838

= Dineutus solitarius =

Species of beetle

Dineutus solitarius is a species of whirligig beetle in the family Gyrinidae. This species is found from Texas and California, through Mexico and Central America to western Costa Rica.
