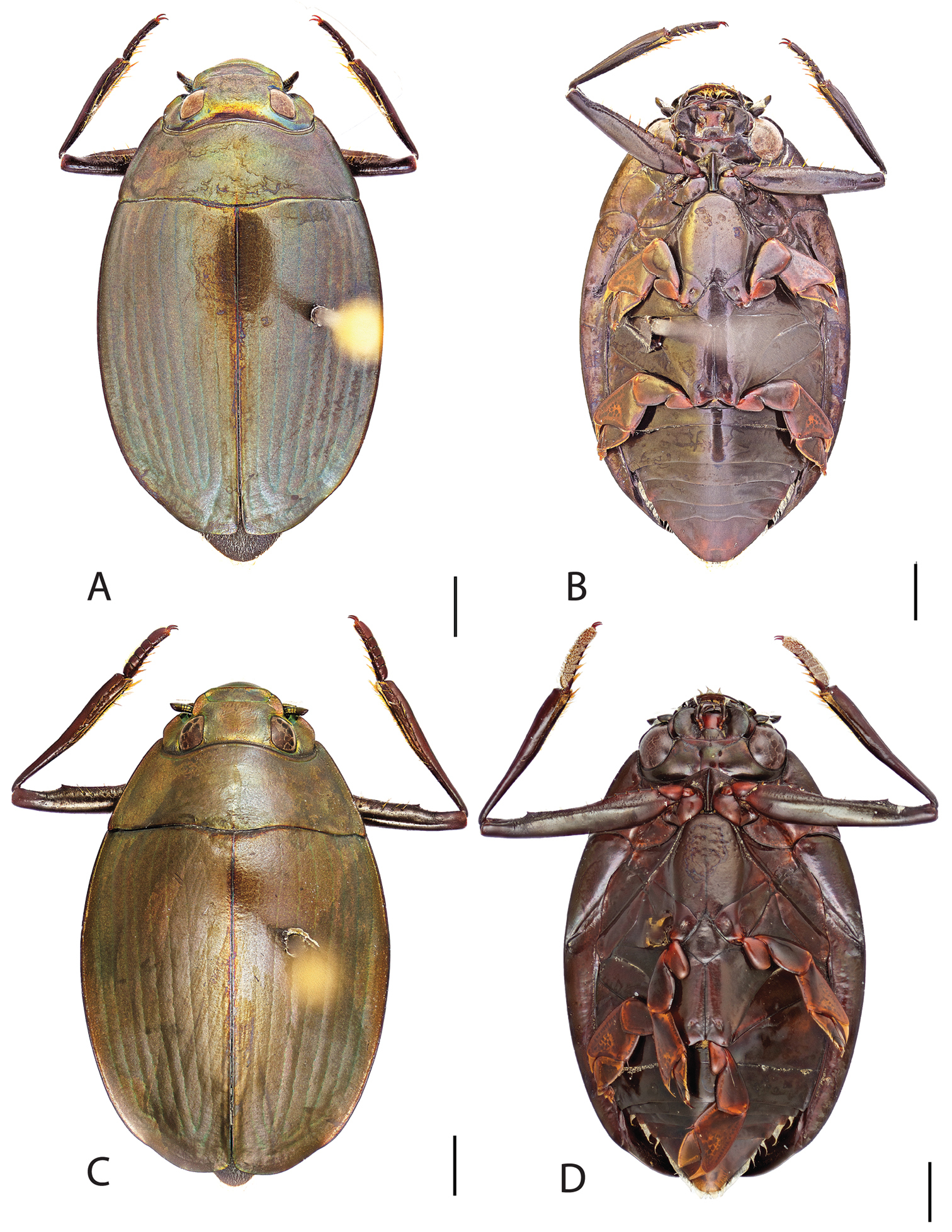

Scientific classification
- Kingdom: Animalia
- Phylum: Arthropoda
- Clade: Pancrustacea
- Class: Insecta
- Order: Coleoptera
- Suborder: Adephaga
- Family: Gyrinidae
- Genus: Dineutus
- Species: D. sublineatus

Binomial name
- Dineutus sublineatus (Chevrolat, 1834)

Synonyms
- Gyrinus sublineatus Chevrolat, 1834; Dineutes integer CLeConte 1854

= Dineutus sublineatus =

Species of beetle

Dineutus sublineatus is a species of whirligig beetle in the family Gyrinidae. It is found in Central America and the Southwestern United States.

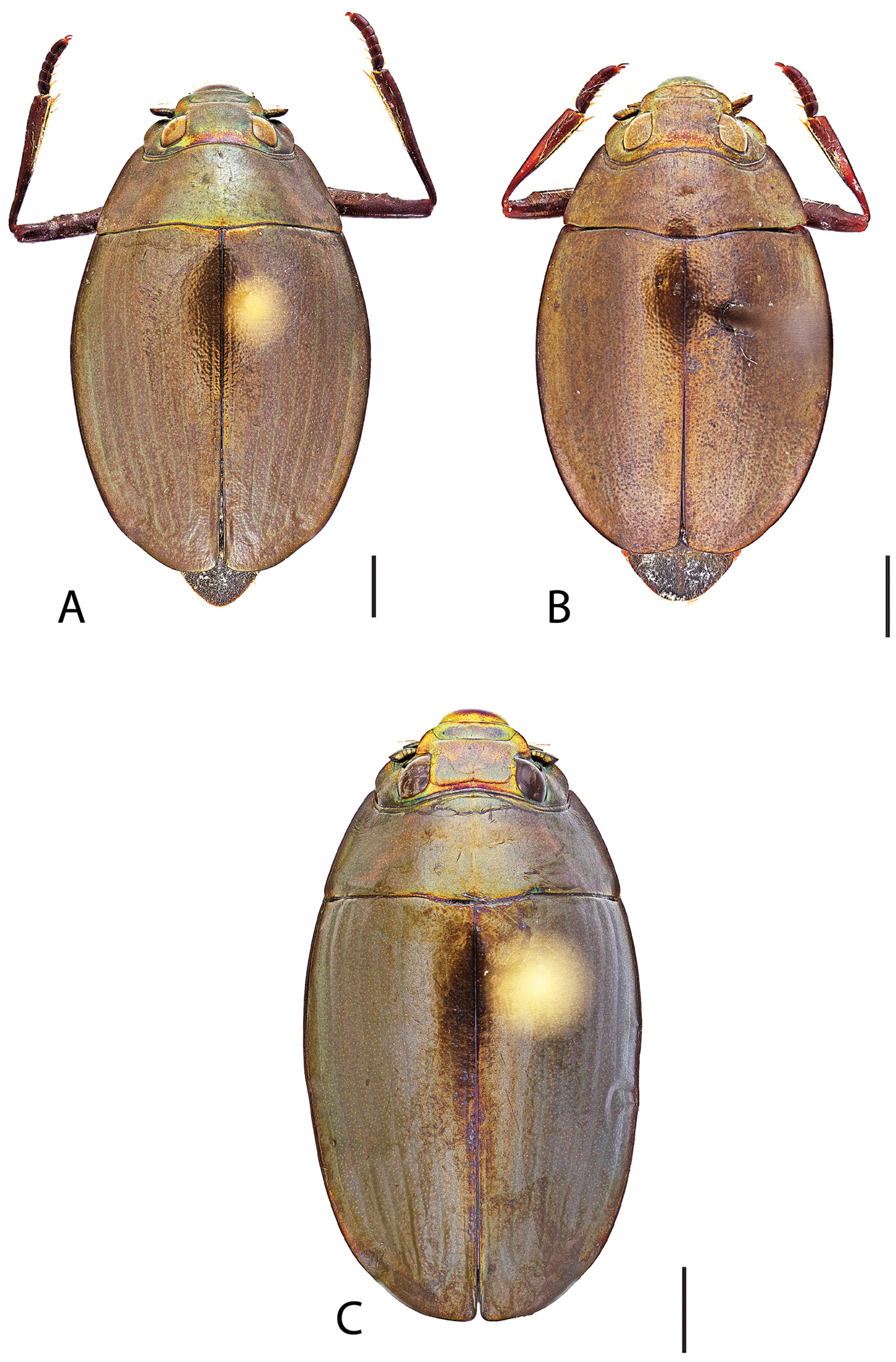
