= Dineutus unidentatus =

Scientific classification
- Kingdom: Animalia
- Phylum: Arthropoda
- Clade: Pancrustacea
- Class: Insecta
- Order: Coleoptera
- Suborder: Adephaga
- Family: Gyrinidae
- Genus: Dineutus
- Species: D. unidentatus

Binomial name
- Dineutus unidentatus Aubé, 1838

Species of beetle

Dineutus unidentatus is a species of whirligig beetle in the family Gyrinidae. This species is found in China (Hainan), Nepal and the Oriental region.
