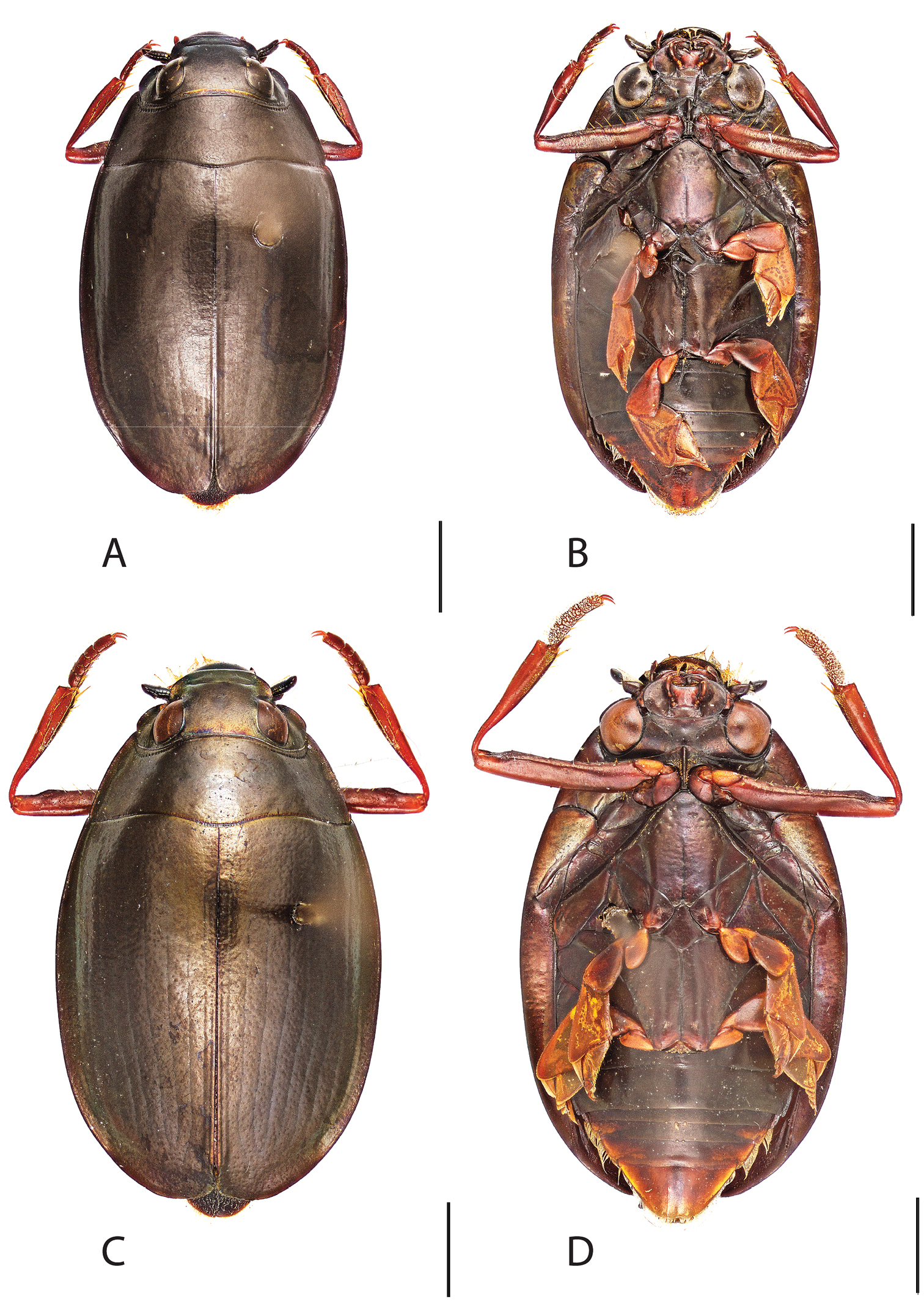

Scientific classification
- Kingdom: Animalia
- Phylum: Arthropoda
- Clade: Pancrustacea
- Class: Insecta
- Order: Coleoptera
- Suborder: Adephaga
- Family: Gyrinidae
- Genus: Dineutus
- Species: D. carolinus

Binomial name
- Dineutus carolinus LeConte, 1868

Synonyms
- Dineutus carolinus mutchleri Ochs, 1924; Dineutus emarginatus mutchleri Ochs, 1924

= Dineutus carolinus =

Species of beetle

Dineutus carolinus is a species of whirligig beetle in the family Gyrinidae. It is found in the Caribbean Sea, Central America, and North America.
