= Dineutus aereus =

Scientific classification
- Kingdom: Animalia
- Phylum: Arthropoda
- Clade: Pancrustacea
- Class: Insecta
- Order: Coleoptera
- Suborder: Adephaga
- Family: Gyrinidae
- Genus: Dineutus
- Species: D. aereus

Binomial name
- Dineutus aereus (Klug, 1834)

Synonyms
- Gyrinus aereus Klug, 1834; Dineutus perezi Régimbart, 1907

Species of beetle

Dineutus aereus is a species of whirligig beetle in the family Gyrinidae. This species is found in Africa, Egypt, the United Arab Emirates, Bahrain, Oman, Saudi Arabia and Yemen.
