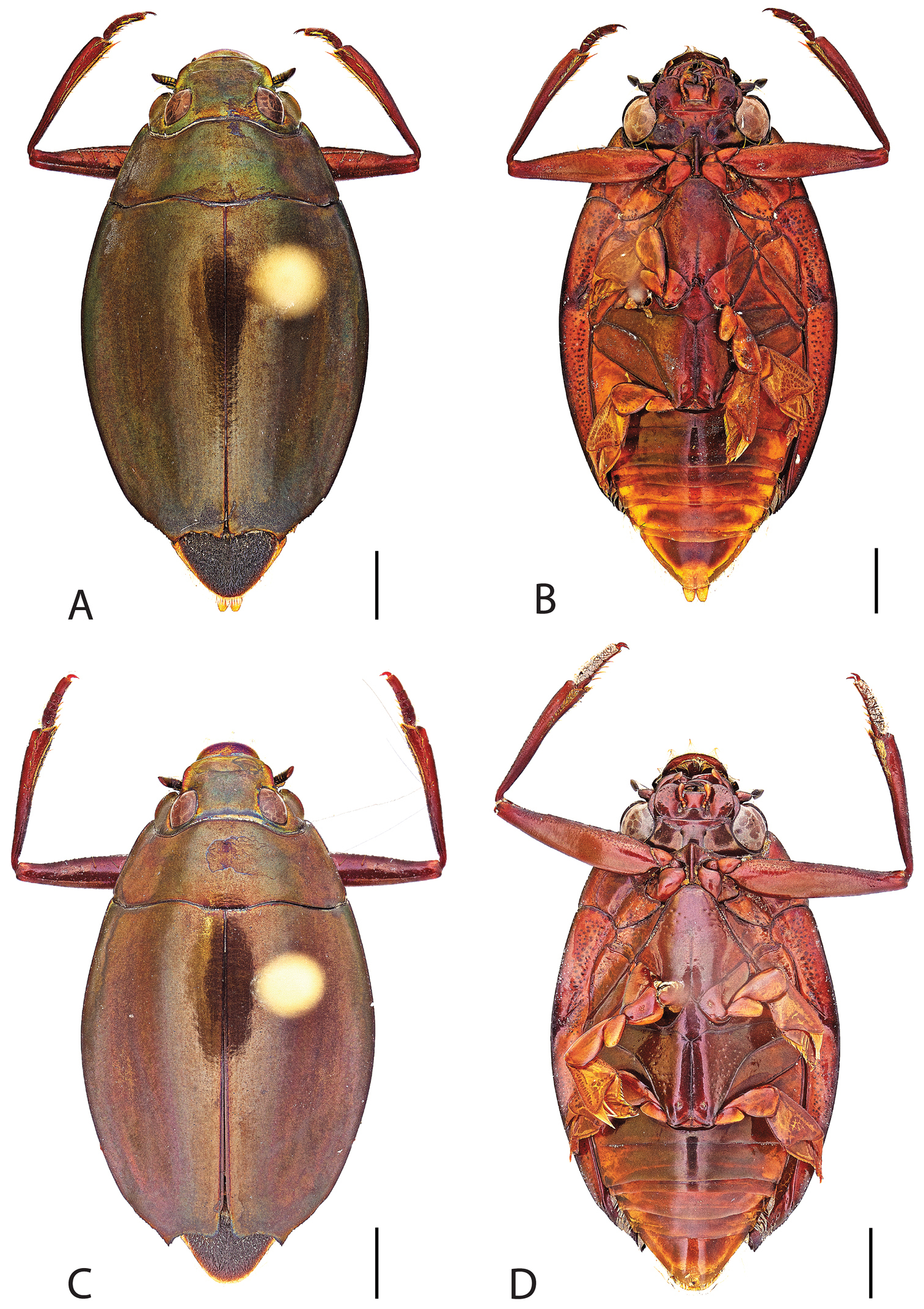

Scientific classification
- Kingdom: Animalia
- Phylum: Arthropoda
- Clade: Pancrustacea
- Class: Insecta
- Order: Coleoptera
- Suborder: Adephaga
- Family: Gyrinidae
- Genus: Dineutus
- Species: D. longimanus

Binomial name
- Dineutus longimanus (Olivier, 1791)

Synonyms
- Gyrinus longimanus Olivier 1795

= Dineutus longimanus =

Species of beetle

Dineutus longimanus is a species of whirligig beetle in the family Gyrinidae. This species is endemic to the Caribbean.

== Subspecies ==
- Dineutus longimanus longimanus (Haiti, Dominican Republic)
- Dineutus longimanus cubensis Ochs, 1927 (Cuba)
- Dineutus longimanus jamaicensis Ochs, 1938 (Jamaica)
- Dineutus longimanus portoricensis Ochs, 1924 (Puerto Rico)
