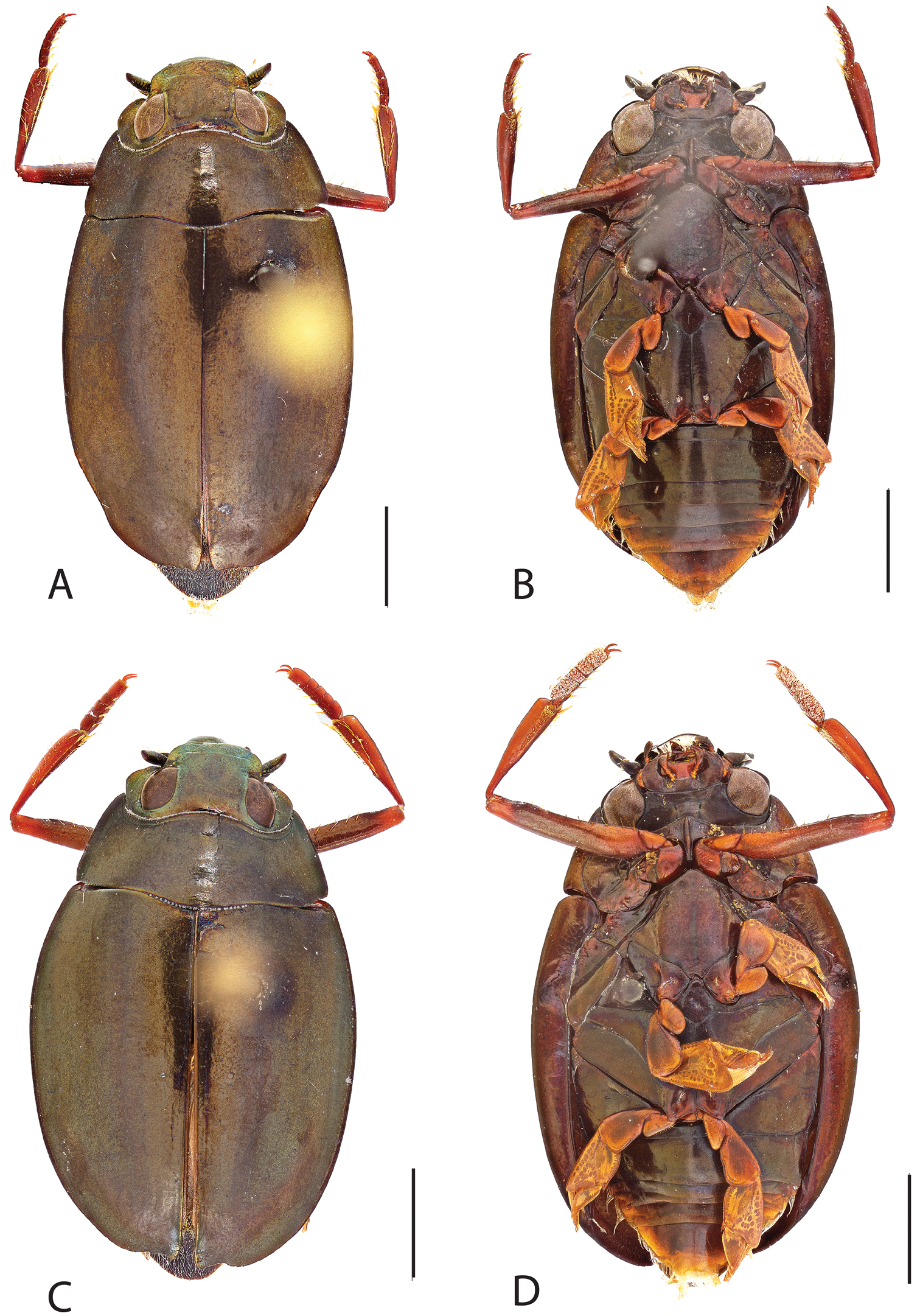
- Image of Dineutus americanus

Scientific classification
- Kingdom: Animalia
- Phylum: Arthropoda
- Clade: Pancrustacea
- Class: Insecta
- Order: Coleoptera
- Suborder: Adephaga
- Family: Gyrinidae
- Genus: Dineutus
- Species: D. americanus

Binomial name
- Dineutus americanus Linnaeus C., 1767

Synonyms
- Gyrinus americanus Linnaeus, 1767; Dineutes metallicus Aubé, 1838; Dineutes americanus Schaum, 1848; Dineutus (Cyclinus) metallicus Ochs, 1926a

= Dineutus americanus =

Species of beetle

Dineutus americanus is a species of whirligig beetle in the family Gyrinidae. This species is found in the Florida Keys, through the Caribbean from the Bahamas to Cuba, Isle de Pinos, Jamaica, the Dominican Republic, Puerto Rico, St. Thomas, St. John, Antigua to Guadeloupe. The habitat consists of still waters and it has also been recorded from caves.
