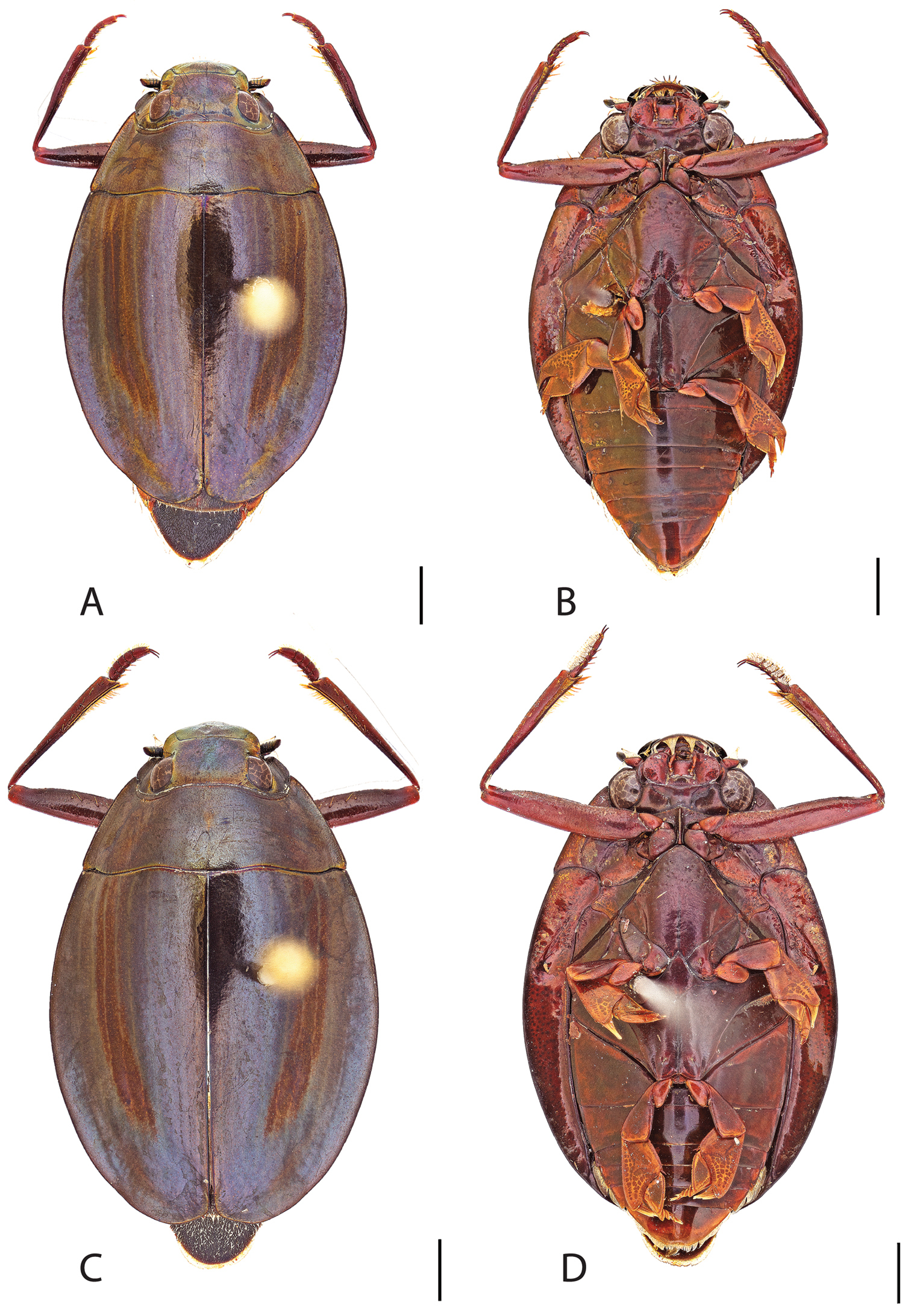

Scientific classification
- Kingdom: Animalia
- Phylum: Arthropoda
- Clade: Pancrustacea
- Class: Insecta
- Order: Coleoptera
- Suborder: Adephaga
- Family: Gyrinidae
- Genus: Dineutus
- Species: D. ciliatus

Binomial name
- Dineutus ciliatus (Forsberg, 1821)

Synonyms
- Gyrinus vittatus Germar, 1824; Cyclous vittatus Dejean, 1833; Dineutes vittatus Brullé, 1835; Cyclous opacus Melsheimer, 1846; Dineutus (Dineutus) ciliatus; Dineutus (Cyclinus) ciliatus

= Dineutus ciliatus =

Species of beetle

Dineutus ciliatus is a species of whirligig beetle in the family Gyrinidae. It is found in North America.
