= Dineutus amazonicus =

Scientific classification
- Kingdom: Animalia
- Phylum: Arthropoda
- Clade: Pancrustacea
- Class: Insecta
- Order: Coleoptera
- Suborder: Adephaga
- Family: Gyrinidae
- Genus: Dineutus
- Species: D. amazonicus

Binomial name
- Dineutus amazonicus Hatch, 1930

Species of beetle

Dineutus amazonicus is a species of whirligig beetle in the family Gyrinidae. This species is only known from the type location in Arkansas.
