= Orectochilus orbisonorum =

Scientific classification
- Kingdom: Animalia
- Phylum: Arthropoda
- Clade: Pancrustacea
- Class: Insecta
- Order: Coleoptera
- Suborder: Adephaga
- Family: Gyrinidae
- Genus: Orectochilus
- Species: O. orbisonorum

Binomial name
- Orectochilus orbisonorum Miller, Mazzoldi & Wheeler, 2008

Species of beetle

Orectochilus orbisonorum is a species of whirligig beetle named in honor of Roy and Barbara Orbison. It's black on top and translucent white on the bottom. Its length is about 5 millimeters. It lives in India.

== See also ==
- List of organisms named after famous people (born 1925–1949)
- List of organisms named after famous people (born 1950–1974)
