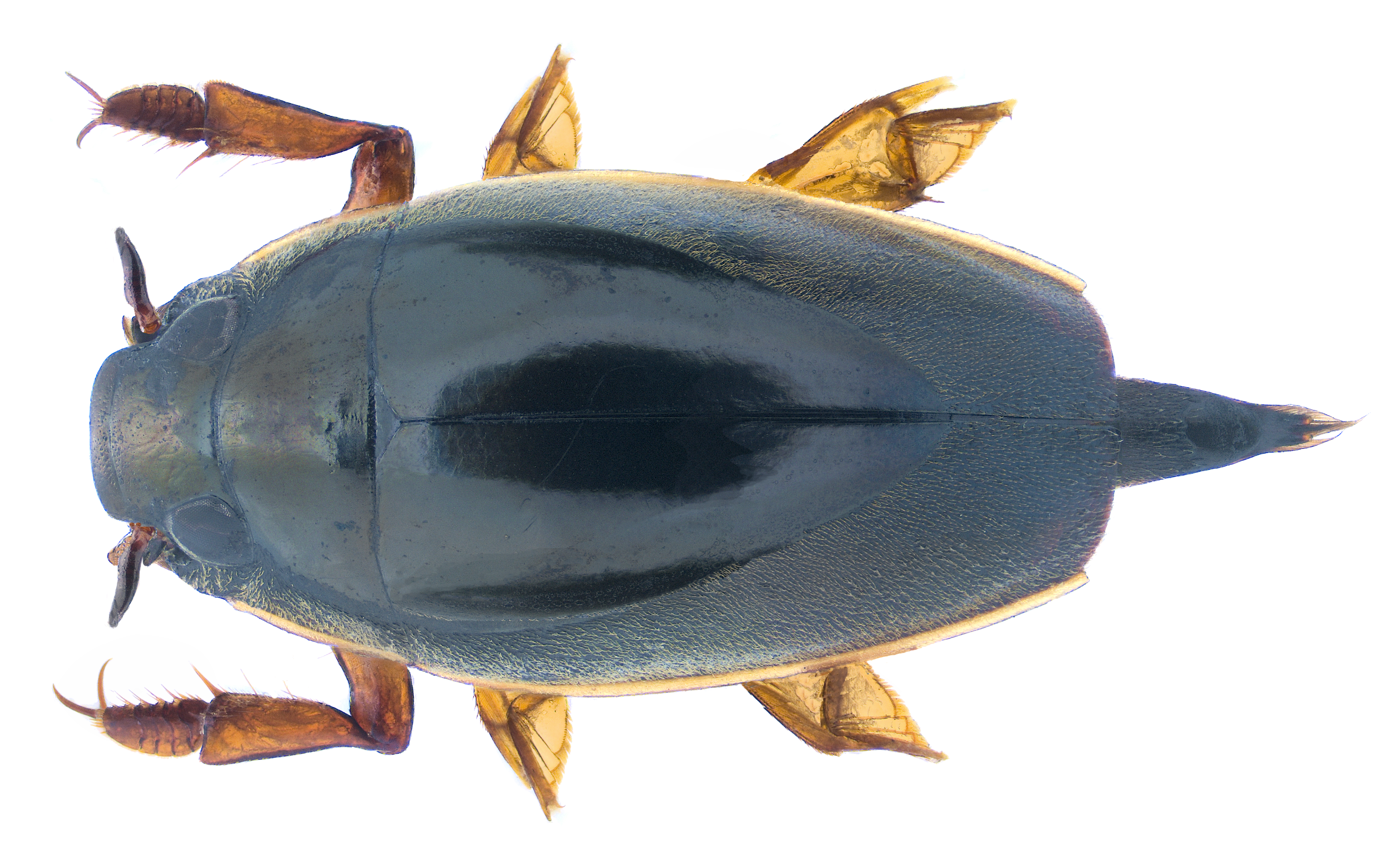

Scientific classification
- Kingdom: Animalia
- Phylum: Arthropoda
- Class: Insecta
- Order: Coleoptera
- Suborder: Adephaga
- Family: Gyrinidae
- Subfamily: Gyrininae
- Tribe: Orectochilini
- Genus: Orectochilus
- Species: O. discifer

Binomial name
- Orectochilus discifer (Walker, 1859)

Synonyms
- Patrus discifer (Walker, 1859)

= Orectochilus discifer =

Species of beetle

Orectochilus discifer, sometimes Patrus discifer, is a species of whirligig beetle found in India, Sri Lanka.

The average size is about 7.1 mm.

It is identified as a host of ectoparasitic fungi called Laboulbenia strangulata.
