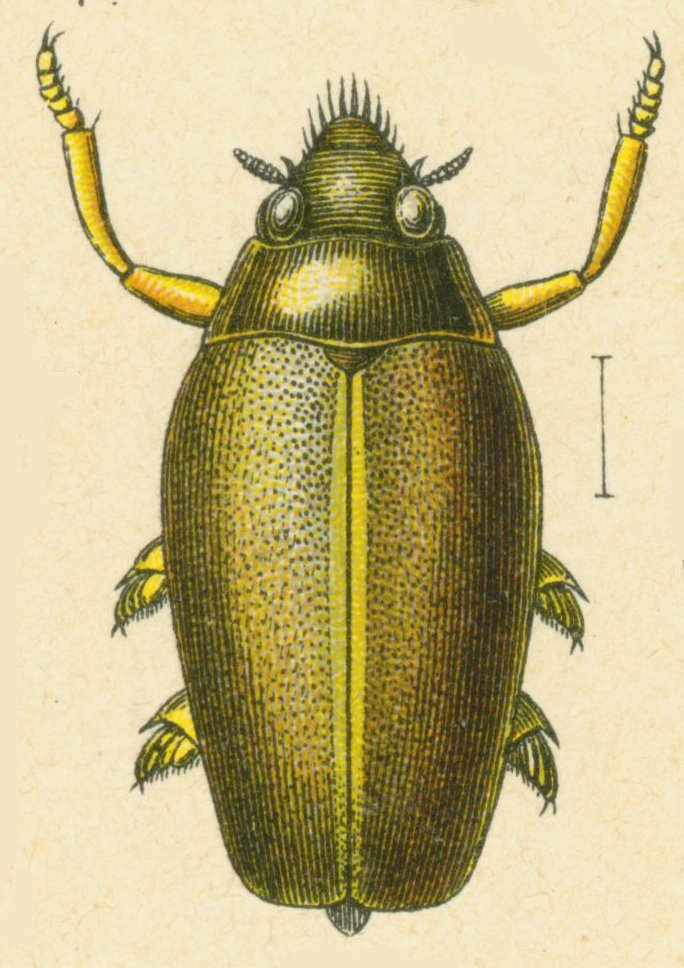
- Orectochilus villosus

Scientific classification
- Kingdom: Animalia
- Phylum: Arthropoda
- Class: Insecta
- Order: Coleoptera
- Suborder: Adephaga
- Family: Gyrinidae
- Subfamily: Gyrininae
- Tribe: Orectochilini
- Genus: Orectochilus; Dejean, 1833

= Orectochilus =

Genus of beetles

Orectochilus is a genus of beetle native to the Palearctic (including Europe), the Near East and North Africa. It contains the following species:

- Orectochilus acuductus Régimbart, 1907
- Orectochilus acutilobus Régimbart, 1907
- Orectochilus aeneipennis Régimbart, 1907
- Orectochilus afghanus Ochs, 1955
- Orectochilus africanus Ochs, 1923
- Orectochilus agilis Sharp, 1884
- Orectochilus agnatus Ochs, 1937
- Orectochilus ahlwarthi Ochs, 1957
- Orectochilus alienus Ochs, 1933
- Orectochilus andamanicus Régimbart, 1884
- Orectochilus angulatus Régimbart, 1882
- Orectochilus angusticinctus Régimbart, 1907
- Orectochilus annandalei Ochs, 1925
- Orectochilus apicalis Régimbart, 1891
- Orectochilus archipelagensis Ochs, 1953
- Orectochilus argenteolimbatus Peschet, 1923
- Orectochilus assequens Ochs, 1936
- Orectochilus assimilis Ochs, 1957
- Orectochilus baeri Régimbart, 1886
- Orectochilus bakeri Ochs, 1924
- Orectochilus bataviensis Régimbart, 1907
- Orectochilus bicolor Ochs, 1957
- Orectochilus biformis Ochs, 1937
- Orectochilus bipartitus Régimbart, 1882
- Orectochilus birmanicus Régimbart, 1891
- Orectochilus boettcheri Ochs, 1937
- Orectochilus brevidens Ochs, 1940
- Orectochilus brevitarsis Falkenström, 1934
- Orectochilus brincki Ochs, 1948
- Orectochilus caliginosus Régimbart, 1907
- Orectochilus cameroni Ochs, 1925
- Orectochilus cardiophorus Régimbart, 1888
- Orectochilus cardoni Régimbart, 1892
- Orectochilus castaneus Régimbart, 1907
- Orectochilus castetsi Régimbart, 1892
- Orectochilus cavernicola Ochs, 1925
- Orectochilus celebensis Régimbart, 1907
- Orectochilus chalceus Ochs, 1936
- Orectochilus chinensis Régimbart, 1892
- Orectochilus choprai Ochs, 1925
- Orectochilus coimbatorensis Ochs, 1925
- Orectochilus compressus Sturm, 1826
- Orectochilus conspicuus Régimbart, 1882
- Orectochilus coomani Peschet, 1925
- Orectochilus cordatus Régimbart, 1888
- Orectochilus corniger Zaitzev, 1910
- Orectochilus corporaali Peschet, 1922
- Orectochilus corpulentus Régimbart, 1884
- Orectochilus crassipes Régimbart, 1884
- Orectochilus cribratellus Régimbart, 1891
- Orectochilus cuneatus Régimbart, 1892
- Orectochilus cupreolus Régimbart, 1907
- Orectochilus cylindricus Régimbart, 1892
- Orectochilus dehiscens Régimbart, 1907
- Orectochilus depressiusculus Ochs, 1940
- Orectochilus desgodinsi Régimbart, 1886
- Orectochilus dilatatus Redtenbacher, 1868
- Orectochilus discifer Walker, 1859
- Orectochilus discus Aubé, 1838
- Orectochilus dispar Régimbart, 1907
- Orectochilus distinguendus Ochs, 1942
- Orectochilus divergens Régimbart, 1907
- Orectochilus drescheri Ochs, 1937
- Orectochilus dulitensis Ochs, 1928
- Orectochilus dulitensis Ochs, 1932
- Orectochilus eberti Ochs, 1966
- Orectochilus emmerichi Falkenström, 1936
- Orectochilus fairmairei Régimbart, 1884
- Orectochilus fallax Peschet, 1923
- Orectochilus feae Régimbart, 1888
- Orectochilus ferruginicollis Régimbart, 1907
- Orectochilus figuratus Régimbart, 1892
- Orectochilus fletcheri Ochs, 1925
- Orectochilus florensis Régimbart, 1892
- Orectochilus foersteri Ochs, 1957
- Orectochilus formosanus Takizawa, 1931
- Orectochilus fraternus Régimbart, 1884
- Orectochilus fruhstorferi Régimbart, 1907
- Orectochilus fusiformis Régimbart, 1892
- Orectochilus gangeticus Wiedemann, 1821
- Orectochilus gestroi Régimbart, 1882
- Orectochilus grandipes Ochs, 1936
- Orectochilus haemorrhous Régimbart, 1892
- Orectochilus helferi Ochs, 1940
- Orectochilus himalayensis Vazirani, 1984
- Orectochilus hirtellus Ochs, 1940
- Orectochilus horni Ochs, 1933
- Orectochilus indicus Régimbart, 1884
- Orectochilus indulans Severin, 1892
- Orectochilus jaechi Mazzoldi, 1998
- Orectochilus javanus Aubé, 1838
- Orectochilus jilanzhui Mazzoldi, 1998
- Orectochilus kempi Ochs, 1925
- Orectochilus kinabaluensis Ochs, 1937
- Orectochilus klapperichi Ochs, 1942
- Orectochilus klynstrai Ochs, 1927
- Orectochilus landaisi Régimbart, 1892
- Orectochilus laticinctus Régimbart, 1907
- Orectochilus latimanus Régimbart, 1907
- Orectochilus leucophthalmus Fröhlich
- Orectochilus limbatus Régimbart, 1884
- Orectochilus longulus Régimbart, 1907
- Orectochilus lucidus Régimbart, 1882
- Orectochilus lumbaris Ochs, 1940
- Orectochilus malaisei Ochs, 1940
- Orectochilus marginepennis Aubé, 1838
- Orectochilus matruelis Régimbart, 1907
- Orectochilus melli Ochs, 1925
- Orectochilus metallicus Régimbart, 1884
- Orectochilus mimicus Ochs, 1936
- Orectochilus minusculus Ochs, 1936
- Orectochilus mjobergi Ochs, 1928
- Orectochilus mjobergianus Falkenström, 1934
- Orectochilus murinus Régimbart, 1892
- Orectochilus murudensis Ochs, 1928
- Orectochilus musculus Ochs, 1940
- Orectochilus nathani Ochs, 1966
- Orectochilus neglectus Ochs, 1925
- Orectochilus nigricans Régimbart, 1892
- Orectochilus nigroaeneus Régimbart, 1907
- Orectochilus nipponensis Zaitzev, 1910
- Orectochilus nitens Peschet, 1923
- Orectochilus nuristanicus Ochs, 1955
- Orectochilus oberthueri Régimbart, 1884
- Orectochilus oblongiusculus Régimbart, 1886
- Orectochilus obscuriceps Régimbart, 1907
- Orectochilus obtusangulus Régimbart, 1907
- Orectochilus obtusipennis Régimbart, 1892
- Orectochilus orbisonorum
- Orectochilus orissaensis Vazirani, 1958
- Orectochilus ornaticollis (Dejean, 1866)
- Orectochilus oxygonus Régimbart, 1907
- Orectochilus palawanensis Régimbart, 1907
- Orectochilus palliatus Dejean, 1833
- Orectochilus panoembanganus Ochs, 1940
- Orectochilus patellimanus Régimbart, 1907
- Orectochilus pendleburyi Ochs, 1932
- Orectochilus pescheti Ochs, 1957
- Orectochilus pfisteri Ochs, 1927
- Orectochilus philippinarum White, 1847
- Orectochilus pilosellus Ochs, 1940
- Orectochilus planatus Ochs, 1937
- Orectochilus planiusculus Ochs, 1937
- Orectochilus procerus Régimbart, 1884
- Orectochilus productus Régimbart, 1884
- Orectochilus pubescens Régimbart, 1882
- Orectochilus pulchellus Régimbart, 1884
- Orectochilus punctilabris Régimbart, 1907
- Orectochilus punctipennis Sharp, 1884
- Orectochilus punctulatus Régimbart, 1886
- Orectochilus pusillus Régimbart, 1882
- Orectochilus regimbarti Sharp, 1884
- Orectochilus ribeiroi Vazirani, 1958
- Orectochilus ritsemae Régimbart, 1882
- Orectochilus rivularis Régimbart, 1884
- Orectochilus ruficaudatus Ochs, 1940
- Orectochilus samarensis Ochs, 1929
- Orectochilus scalaris Régimbart, 1880
- Orectochilus schillhammeri Mazzoldi, 1998
- Orectochilus schultzei Ochs, 1924
- Orectochilus sculpturatus Régimbart, 1884
- Orectochilus seminitens Ochs, 1937
- Orectochilus semivestitus Guérin-Meneville, 1840
- Orectochilus severini Régimbart, 1892
- Orectochilus similis Ochs, 1929
- Orectochilus sinhalensis Ochs, 1937
- Orectochilus spiniger Régimbart, 1880
- Orectochilus spinosus Zimmermann, 1917
- Orectochilus staudingeri Régimbart, 1907
- Orectochilus strandi Ochs, 1936
- Orectochilus striolifer Régimbart, 1907
- Orectochilus sublineatus Régimbart, 1892
- Orectochilus subsinuatus Ochs, 1928
- Orectochilus sulcipennis Régimbart, 1892
- Orectochilus sutteri Ochs, 1953
- Orectochilus teranishii Kamiya, 1933
- Orectochilus tibialis Ochs, 1940
- Orectochilus timorensis Régimbart, 1907
- Orectochilus tomentosus Régimbart, 1891
- Orectochilus tonkinensis Régimbart, 1892
- Orectochilus trianguliger Régimbart, 1888
- Orectochilus undulans Régimbart, 1892
- Orectochilus validus Régimbart, 1882
- Orectochilus velatus Ochs, 1940
- Orectochilus vestitus Sturm, 1843
- Orectochilus villosovittatus Régimbart, 1891
- Orectochilus villosus (Müller, 1776)
- Orectochilus vitalisi Peschet, 1923
- Orectochilus volubilis Ochs, 1929
- Orectochilus wangi Mazzoldi, 1998
- Orectochilus waterstradti Ochs, 1940
- Orectochilus wehnckei Régimbart, 1884
- Orectochilus wui Ochs, 1932
- Orectochilus yayeyamensis Satô, 1971
- Orectochilus zeravschanicus Glasunow, 1893
