= Bess Flynn =

American actress and writer (1886–1976)

Bess McAllister Flynn (August 1886 - February 28, 1976) was an American actress and a writer of radio soap operas.

== Early years ==
Born Bess McAllister in Iowa in August 1886, Flynn was the daughter of a schoolmaster and a teacher. She began teaching in a country school when she was 16, but she resigned three years later to become a member of a traveling stock theater troupe.

== Acting ==
Flynn acted in stock theater in Canada and in the midwestern United States before she began working on radio. Her husband was also a stock actor, and when they began having children, they left the theater and operated a printing business. The depression ended that income. In 1931 she took her son to Chicago to audition for a radio program. The audition was delayed because of the lack of a woman to read some lines in the script, so Flynn volunteered to do that. She and her son left with roles on the show, with Flynn portraying Tilda on The Gumps. Flynn also portrayed Mother Moynihan on Painted Dreams. Other radio programs on which she acted included Princess Pat Players.

== Writing ==
Flynn's acting on radio kindled her interest in writing. As she read her lines, she decided to try writing scripts, and in 1935 she began doing so. When a dispute about sponsorship caused Irna Phillips to stop writing Painted Dreams, Flynn became one of the show's new writers. In 1940 she left acting entirely so that she could spend more time writing.

By May 1941, Flynn was producing about 30,000 words weekly as she wrote for 10 radio programs. Programs that she wrote included We Love and Learn, Life Begins (later retitled Martha Webster), Bachelor's Children and We Are Four. She was an advisor for the soap opera We, the Abbotts.

Flynn said that the quality of a writer's work increased with practice: "You must write, and write, and write, every day until gradually your style is improved and your thoughts along with it and suddenly you, will have 'succeeded', for it is an unquestioned fact that improvement and success are the direct result of practice."

Flynn dictated scripts to a secretary, seldom remaining still while she talked. A 1940 newspaper article said:

She acts out the parts, weeps, moans, laughs, cries, harangues, shouts. Dictation makes her restless. Suddenly she will stop to play with her dog or water a plant, or she'll pick up a book, thumb through it then suddenly throw it down to emphasize a speech. Clasping her hands in dejection during a sad scene, she'll abruptiy sit down and start a game of solitaire, still dictating.

After Flynn moved to New York, her new neighbors were concerned about what they considered to be unusual activity in her apartment. When the building superintendent asked her about that activity, she replied, "Tell them that I'm just a radio writer in the pangs of creation and I may need help any minute." At one point a sprained ankle failed to diminish her physical activity while writing. She "hobbled across the floor on crutches" as she dictated.

Flynn said that criticism leveled at soap operas "could have been avoided if certain sponsors and agencies — not all of them by any means — had not underestimated the tastes of their listeners." She said, "Some [soap operas], not many, have good writing and are first-class popular entertainment", She added that many novels had literary quality while they appealed to the masses, noting that a similar situation could exist for serial dramas on radio. To do so, she said, "intelligent fans" would need to "write letters demanding better soap operas." That effort would lead sponsors and agencies to "forget their silly taboos".

Flynn was part of "a vigorous new school of near-realists" in soap opera, a description that encompassed directors, writers, and producers who valued intimacy and sincerity more than thrills in the shows on which they worked. Flynn said that, as she had plots in mind "for the next two years or more", she considered the characters in her shows to be real and avoided getting them involved in devices such as court trials, kidnappings, and murders.

Like other radio writers, Flynn based some content of her scripts on her real-life experiences and her acquaintances. She based Dr. Robert Graham (the leading man in Bachelor's Children) on Dr. Robert Black, her children's pediatrician in Chicago. She occasionally consulted Black when segments of scripts related to medical topics.

== Personal life and death ==
She married actor Edward Flynn in Chicago. They had three children, all of whom acted on radio. She died on February 28, 1976.
