= These Are My Children =

1949 American soap opera, considered the first to be broadcast on television

These Are My Children is an American television soap opera, or novella, that ran on NBC from January 31 to March 4, 1949. The show was broadcast live from WNBQ in Chicago, Illinois, airing 15 minutes a day, five days a week, at 5 p.m. EST. It is widely credited as the first soap opera broadcast on television. It may be more accurately described as the first daytime drama or the first soap opera strip, as it was preceded by DuMont series Faraway Hill in 1946 and Highway to the Stars in 1947, both of which are described as soap operas but aired later in the evenings and broadcast only once a week; Guiding Light had also been in production for 12 years once These Are My Children debuted, but only as a radio series - its TV version did not debut until 1952.

Created by Irna Phillips and directed by Norman Felton, the show was based in large part on Phillips' early radio soaps Today's Children and Painted Dreams.

In addition to critical opinions, the immediate factor in NBC's cancellation of These Are My Children was the decision by AT&T Corporation to end use of its coaxial cable for weekday eastbound distribution of programs originating in Chicago. Simultaneously executives of NBC "had found fault with the program" while they wanted to have more shows originate in New York rather than in Chicago or on the West Coast.

Phillips later created many popular daytime dramas, and Felton produced primetime soaps Dr. Kildare and Executive Suite.

== Premise ==
Children centered on an Irish widow, Mrs. Henehan and her struggles to run a boarding house, as well as help her three children and her new daughter-in-law, Jean.

== Cast ==
- Alma Platts as Mother Henehan
- George Kluge as John Henehan
- Joan Arlt as Jean Henehan
- Jane Brooksmith as Patricia Henehan
- Martha McClain as Penny Henehan
- Margaret Heneghan as Aunt Kitty Henehan
- Eloise Kummer as Katherine "Kay" Carter
- Mignon Schreiber as Mrs. Berkovitch

== Critical response ==
A review in the trade publication Variety described These Are My Children as "visualization of an ordinary actionless daytime drama" It said that the program differed from soap operas on radio only in that "the actors have memorized lines and have to look sad most of the time."
