= Adopted Daughter =

Radio soap opera

- Genre: Soap Opera
- Country of origin: USA
- Language: English
- Home station: WOW
- Starring: Jettabee Ann Hopkins; Alan Bunce
- Announcer: Art Miller
- Written by: Jettabee Ann Hopkins
- Original release: 1937
- Sponsored by: J. C. Penney

Adopted Daughter was a radio soap opera in the United States. It premiered in 1937 on station WOW in Omaha, Nebraska, and moved to NBC's Midwest regional network in 1939. It was broadcast there five times a week for two years. The show was sponsored by J. C. Penney. Billboard magazine noted that the program was J.C. Penney's "first use of radio on a national basis." After 26 successful weeks on WOW, the program was carried on 16 stations via transcription.

== Plot ==
Based on a series of skits called The Jangles, the story of Adopted Daughter centered on Jerry Jangles, a "courageous young wife who fights for home and happiness." The show took place in a small mid-western town and talked about the struggles of an average young couple with interfering in-laws.

== Cast ==
The cast included Jettabee Ann Hopkins (who also wrote the program) and Alan Bunce. The announcer was Art Miller.

== See also ==
- List of radio soaps
