= Webnovela =

Type of fan fiction

A webnovela or foronovela is a type of fan fiction. The term "webnovela" or "web novel" adapts the word "telenovela" for web-based fan fiction. They are written and read primarily in Latin American and European countries.

They are often written like soap operas and can involve fans of a particular serial or telenovela creating a story based on that series' characters. The term "webnovela" is also used to refer to the hosting by Univision of recorded telenovelas online.

== Cyberseries ==
A variation of the webnovela is the cyberserie. The cyberserie are more like North American series. They have seasons, and are composed usually of Anglo-Saxon actors.

== See also ==
- Web series
- Original net animation
- Mobile soap opera
