= Original net animation =

Anime released directly online

An original net animation (ONA), known in Japan as web anime (Webアニメ, webu anime), is an anime that is directly released onto the Internet. ONAs may also have been aired on television if they were first directly released on the Internet. The name mirrors original video animation, a term that has been used in the anime industry for straight-to-video animation since the early 1980s.

A growing number of trailers and preview episodes of new anime have been released as ONA. For example, the anime movie of Megumi can be considered an ONA. ONAs have the tendency to be shorter than traditional anime titles, sometimes running only a few minutes. There are many examples of an original net animation, such as Hetalia: Axis Powers, which only last a few minutes per episode. But while that was true for the beginning of the 2010s, this began to change in the second half of the decade as full series began to be licensed exclusively for streaming services like Netflix, Amazon Prime Video, and Disney+.

Most animation in Japan is made for television or for other audio-visual formats, which include ONAs that can be viewed on television, mobile devices or computers.

== History ==
Makoto Shinkai was a pioneer of original net animation (ONA) in the late 1990s, producing his first animated short films on a home computer and distributing them on the Internet. He produced the earliest animated short ONA, including Tōi Sekai (Other Worlds) in 1997, Kakomareta Sekai (The World Be Enclosed) in 1998, and She and Her Cat in 1999. Another early short ONA was Azumanga Web Daioh (2000).

As broadband Internet bandwidth began to increase in speed and availability, delivering high-quality online video over the Internet became a reality. In the early 2000s, the Japanese anime industry began broadcasting ONA web series on the Internet. Early examples of ONA series include Infinite Ryvius: Illusion (2000), Ajimu (2001) and Mahou Yuugi (2001).

== See also ==
- Original video animation
- Webisode
- Web series
- Webnovela
- Mobile soap opera
