= Today's Children =

- A 1935 Pillsbury premium
- Genre: Soap opera
- Running time: 15 minutes
- Country of origin: United States
- Language(s): English
- Home station: NBC
- Starring: Irna Phillips
- Announcer: Louis Roen (1933–1937)
- Created by: Irna Phillips
- Written by: Irna Phillips, Virginia Cooke (dialogue, second series)
- Directed by: Axel Gruenberg (1943–1950)
- Produced by: Carl Wester (1943–1950)
- Recording studio: Chicago, Illinois (1933–1937, 1943–1946), Hollywood, California (1946–1950)
- Original release: September 11, 1933 – June 2, 1950
- No. of series: Two
- Audio format: Mono
- Sponsored by: Pillsbury (1933–1937), General Mills (1943–1950)

Today's Children was a name shared by two thematically related American radio soap operas created and written by Irna Phillips, the earliest of which was her first nationally networked series.

== 1933–1938 series ==
The original series, which debuted on September 11, 1933, revolved around the large Moran clan, headed by widow Mary "Mother" Moran, who was voiced by Phillips herself. Mother Moran had three adult children—Terry, Frances, and Eileen—whose troubles she dealt with using what promotional materials called "warm-hearted understanding and a common-sense philosophy."

The creation of the series was a direct result of Phillips' resignation from her pioneering WGN series Painted Dreams when the station refused to allow her to take the program to a network. As a result of the station's decision, she created Children for NBC-owned WMAQ as a thinly disguised version of the earlier series. Mother Moran was based on Mother Moynahan. the mother-in-law of WGN station manager Harry Gilman, and Lucy Gilman's grandmother. The series ended on December 31, 1937, replaced in the new year by another Phillips creation, Woman in White.

In 1937 a novel was published in book form by Pillsbury Flour Mills Company based on the radio program and given the same name ("Today's Children"). The copyright was held by the National Broadcasting Company. No author was cited in the book. The book was illustrated with line drawings depicting the action, as well as photographs of the leading characters in the show, identified by their character names only.

=== Characters ===
A 1935 Pillsbury advertising premium describes the characters as follows.

- Mary "Mother" Moran: "The widowed mother of Terry, Frances and Eileen—a typical American family of today. So big is her heart that its loving kindness has taken in all the others—the people she calls her "family of Today's Children." Her quiet old-fashioned philosophy has brought peace and understanding to all the members of her family in times of trouble, for hers is a philosophy as sound and as enduring as the eternal hills—love of family, love of home, and love of fellow man."
- Frances Moran: "The elder daughter, Frances, is twenty-five, tall and very blond. An ambitious, talented and successful commercial artist, she is typical of the modern business girl. Ordinarily practical and level-headed, she has occasionally let the dictates of her heart lead her into difficulties, but has a way of regaining her balance."
- Eileen Moran: "The youngest of Mother Moran's children, she is perhaps her mother's secret favorite. Petite, dark and unsophisticated Eileen, at twenty has secured a foothold on the ladder of artistic success through her beautiful singing voice. Yet today she is not quite so sure that her first ambition—to have a career—is more worthwhile than love, family and a home."
- Terry Moran: "Mother Moran's 'first born,' Terry is thirty-three, tall, and like his sister Eileen, dark. He has had his ups and downs, but is now well established as an executive of an advertising agency. A devoted father and husband, his deep affection for little Lucy and Bobbie, and for his wife, Dorothy, is generally concealed by his undemonstrative manner."
- Dot: "In Dorothy, we find the typical young mother of today, meeting the new and yet old problems of wifehood and motherhood with present-day intelligence and spirit. She has been obliged to live in close contact with her husband's family because of economic necessity, but has met the situation with rare sympathy and understanding."
- Lucy: "'Do you know what?' characterizes little Lucy, the self-appointed bearer of news between the various households of 'Today's Children.' This pert but intelligent youngster, who recently celebrated her tenth birthday, has been a constant source of joy, and amusement, and affection, to the entire family."
- Dick Crane: "Richard Crane, Bob's brother, is twenty-two, dark and impulsive. He is typical of the farm boy who has tasted both college and the city and so feels that he can never reconcile himself to future on the farm, even though business connections have help him there until very recently. He is eager and ambitious to rise in the world."
- Bob Crane: "The idealism that characterizes Robert Crane may have come from his childhood spent on a farm. His fine family background, together with his early contact with Mother Nature, have given him high ideals and a broad understanding and tolerance. At thirty, he is a successful young attorney, becoming more and more involved in reform politics."
- Kay: "A dark, striking brunette of twenty-eight, Mrs. Robert Crane (Katherine Norton) is at times wholeheartedly generous toward others, and again utterly selfish in her desire for happiness. She was a successful young business woman before her marriage, but felt she had realized her fondest dream when she became a wife and home-maker."

== 1943–1950 series ==
Six years following the end of the original series, Phillips created a new serial bearing the Today's Children title which began on December 13, 1943 on NBC radio, related to the original series only by its general dramatic themes and the setting of Chicago's Hester Street. The new serial followed the family of Mama and Papa Schultz, played by Virginia Payne and Murray Forbes.

Originally, the series was one of three Phillips-created serials which made up the General Mills Hour, with characters and plots crossing over between Children, The Guiding Light, and Woman In White. Although Phillips was integral in plotting the revived series, the dialogue was written by Virginia Cooke. The second version of Today's Children ended on June 2, 1950.

== See also ==
- List of radio soaps
