= Front Line Family =

British radio soap opera

Front Line Family is a British radio soap opera initially broadcast on the BBC's North American shortwave service. It ran from April 1941 until 1948, when it was replaced by Mrs Dale's Diary. The show's storylines depicted the trials and tribulations of a British family, the Robinsons, living through the war. This featured plots about rationing, family members missing in action and the Blitz.

The BBC had resisted soaps as antithetical to its quality image, but began Front Line Family to encourage American intervention on Britain's behalf in World War II. The network instructed the show's writer that "[t]his material must appeal to an audience of relatively limited mentality, an audience who believes in thrilleresque, is not squeamish, and is almost completely credulous". Front Line Family became popular, and soon independent radio stations purchased it for rebroadcasting within the United States. After the war the show was moved to the Light Programme in 1946 and continued to run until 1948.

== See also ==
- Radio drama
