= Irna Phillips =

American screenwriter and actress (1901–1973)

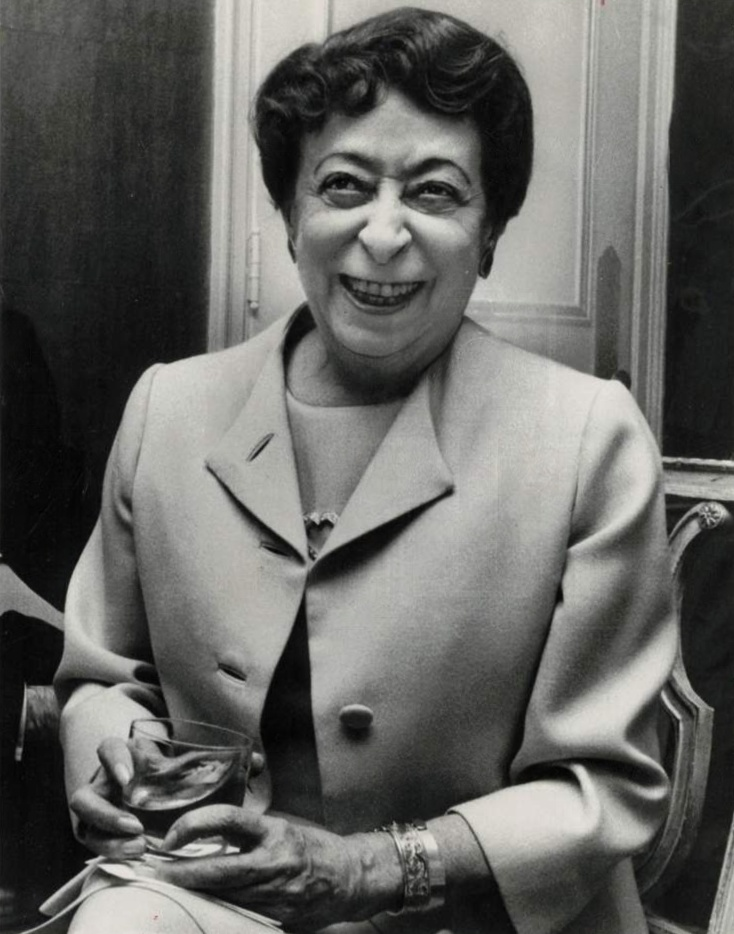
- Phillips in 1970
- Born: July 1, 1901; Chicago, Illinois, U.S.
- Died: December 23, 1973 (aged 72); Chicago, Illinois, U.S.
- Occupations: Scriptwriter; screenwriter; producer; actress
- Years active: 1930–1972
- Children: 2

Irna Phillips (July 1, 1901 – December 23, 1973) was an American scriptwriter, screenwriter, casting agent, and actress who pioneered a style of daytime soap opera in the United States geared specifically toward women. Phillips created, produced, and wrote several radio and television daytime serials throughout her career, including Guiding Light, As the World Turns, and Another World. She was also a mentor to several other pioneers of the American daytime soap opera, including Agnes Nixon, William J. Bell and Ted Corday.

== Personal life ==
Phillips was one of 10 children born to a German-Jewish family in Chicago. Her father died when she was 8, leaving her mother alone to raise the children. She claimed to be a lonely child always given hand-me-down clothes and making up long and involved stories for her dolls to live out. At 19, she was pregnant, abandoned by her boyfriend, and then gave birth to a still-born baby. She studied drama at the University of Illinois at Urbana-Champaign (where she became a member of Phi Sigma Sigma sorority), receiving a Master of Arts degree before going on to earn a master's degree in journalism at the University of Wisconsin–Madison.

Phillips wanted to be an actress, but her teachers told her she was too plain to have any real success. From 1925 to 1930, she worked as a school teacher in Dayton, Ohio, teaching drama and theatre history to schoolchildren. While working in this capacity she continued to attempt a career as an actress, and after performing several acting roles for radio productions at WGN in Chicago, she left her career as a teacher. At the age of 42, Phillips adopted a son, Thomas Dirk Phillips. A year later, she adopted a daughter, Katherine Louise Phillips.

== Career ==
=== Early radio career: Painted Dreams and Woman in White (1930–40) ===
After working as a staff writer on a daytime talk show, Phillips created the serial Painted Dreams, which aired daily except Sundays on local Chicago station WGN. Phillips wrote every episode of the series in addition being a starring cast member as the characters Mother Moynihan and Sue Morton. Mother Moynihan was a widowed matriarch of a large Irish-American family. Phillips based Mother Moynihan's struggles on her own mother's obstacles. After creating, producing and starring in Painted Dreams, Phillips became credited with innovating a daytime serial format for radio geared toward women. Later known as “Queen of the Soaps”, she introduced techniques such as the organ bridge to give a smooth flow between scenes and the cliff-hanger ending to each episode.

Phillips endured much disapproval for her writing, especially from sponsors like Procter & Gamble. The radio business during the 1930s was heavily male-dominated, and as result, it was claimed the audience for Phillips' serials were childlike, unrealistic, vulgar, and distasteful. In reality, her female characters were depicted as strong women with options, education, and personality. Phillips' characters were not something of the ordinary for the stereotypical 1930s women. No regular male roles were introduced until later in the series' run. The conflict most basic to the programs' dramatic structure was that between traditional and changing gender roles: Irene Moynihan, the daughter was characterized as the “aspiring modern girl, with ambitions toward a career”, against Mother Moynihan's and Sue Morton's more traditional views. Although Painted Dreams began as an unsponsored program, Phillips believed that a radio series must be a "utility to its sponsors" and that it must "actually sell merchandise; otherwise the object of radio advertising has failed". With this in mind, she wrote in an engagement and a wedding which provided the possibility of product tie-ins.

In 1932, Phillips urged WGN to sell Painted Dreams to a national network. When they refused, Phillips took them to court, claiming the series as her own property. WGN manager Henry Selinger claimed to have come up with the original daytime serial to sell products for women. However, Phillips was hired to write as well as perform in this first series. Disputes of ownership over the innovative serial ended Phillips' association with WGN and she was picked up by opponent station WMAQ. Painted Dreams was then changed to Today's Children featuring the same plot and debate over starting a career or starting a family. Phillips had then learned to retain all rights and ownership to her newly titled show and the many that followed during her career.

By 1938, Painted Dreams emerged from the courts and was purchased by CBS. The nature of the court settlement prohibited Phillips from any future involvement with the series. That year, when Phillips's mother died, she demanded that Today's Children be discontinued out of respect. CBS agreed and replaced it with her new series, Woman in White, a serial which focused on the internal workings of a hospital; it was one of the first daytime serials to be set in a hospital. It was on Woman in White that Phillips first began working with Agnes Nixon. William J. Bell also began his apprenticeship under Phillips during her radio days.

=== Radio and television series: The Guiding Light and As the World Turns (1940–60) ===
In 1937, Phillips collaborated with Emmons Carlson on her third radio serial, The Guiding Light (shortened to simply Guiding Light after 1975), basing it on personal experiences; after giving birth to a stillborn child at age 19, she found spiritual comfort listening to sermons by a preacher of a church centered on the brotherhood of man. It was these sermons that formed the nucleus of the creation of The Guiding Light. From 1937 to 1946, the series was broadcast from Chicago on the NBC radio network. The show was cancelled by NBC twice; once in 1939, and once in 1946. After the first time on October 13, 1939, it was brought back by popular demand of the listening audience and began again only four months later on January 22, 1940. NBC cancelled the series a second time on November 29, 1946, coinciding with the U.S. Federal Communications Commission forcing a split of NBC and the creation of the ABC network. CBS would pick up the series seven months later on June 2, 1947, where it transferred to television in June 1952, and where it would stay for the remainder of its run until its television conclusion in September 2009.

In the 1940s, Phillips wrote two million words a year, dictated six to eight hours a day, and earned $250,000 a year. Her other serials of the era included The Right to Happiness (1939–60) and The Brighter Day (1954–62). In 1938, Phillips supervised the creation of the tie-in book, The Guiding Light, published by The Guiding Light Co. of 360 North Michigan Avenue Chicago, Illinois. The book traced the backstory of the radio series, told from the point of view of the "keeper of the guiding light", Reverend John Ruthledge.

In 1949, Phillips created the first serial broadcast on a major television network, These Are My Children, which ran on NBC for one month. In 1956, she created As the World Turns, one of the first two daytime serials to run a half-hour in length (the other being The Edge of Night, which premiered on CBS the same day). Within two years, As the World Turns had become the highest-rated drama, a position it would retain for over two decades. Within six months of the series' debut, Phillips fired lead actress Helen Wagner because she reportedly did not like the way she poured coffee. Procter & Gamble and CBS both backed Wagner, and Phillips was forced to rehire her. Wagner remained as a cast member on the series until her death in 2010, just months before As the World Turns concluded.

=== Final years: Another World, Love is a Many Splendored Thing and return to As the World Turns (1964–73) ===
Phillips co-created Another World with William J. Bell in 1964, originally planned as a sister show to As the World Turns. Although Procter & Gamble owned both series, CBS had no room for the program and rival network NBC acquired broadcast rights. Phillips fired veteran actor John Beal from Another World after only one episode, and actress Fran Sharon after two weeks. Actress Kay Campbell stated, "I'll never forget once on As the World Turns, Rosemary Prinz did a scene, and when we were only off the air five minutes, Irna was on the phone and tore her to pieces. I don't think Irna liked actors." Phillips and Bell would cede the head writing role at Another World to James Lipton; Agnes Nixon would succeed him.

In 1965, Phillips was a story editor for Days of Our Lives and was a story consultant on Peyton Place before co-creating Our Private World, the first primetime series to be spun off from a daytime serial. The series featured the As the World Turns character Lisa Miller; the series ran during the spring, summer and early fall of 1965, before being cancelled. She left Love is a Many Splendored Thing when CBS censors refused to fully tell a love story involving an Amerasian woman (born out of the love affair in the original film) and a white man. CBS and Twentieth Century-Fox Television were co- producers of the show. All 1,430 episodes of Love Is a Many Splendored Thing were recorded on videotape at CBS Broadcast Center Studio 41 in New York.

Phillips was the unofficial story editor for A World Apart, an ABC soap opera that was created by her daughter, Katherine. One of the main characters was a soap opera writer who lived in Chicago and was in charge of a soap opera in New York. Soon after, As the World Turns asked her to come back and write for them. Phillips introduced a number of characters to the show and integrated them with the core Hughes family. Her new story, and the show's new heroine, Kimberly Sullivan (Kathryn Hays), became involved with longtime hero, Bob Hughes (Don Hastings). Bob was married to Kim's sister Jennifer, but Phillips had Kim seduce Bob. She became pregnant. P&G fired Phillips in early 1973; it was to be her last writing gig.

On January 25, 2007, in an episode celebrating the 70th Anniversary of Guiding Light, the current cast portrayed actors and behind-the-scenes personnel from the early years of the series (both radio and TV). Beth Ehlers played Phillips, and several incidents in her life were fictionalized in the series.

Phillips retained ownership rights to all her series, producing through Carl Wester and Company and allowing agencies, sponsors, and networks little control over her soap operas.

=== Posthumous tribute ===
In 2019, Time created 89 new covers to celebrate women of the year starting from 1920; it chose Phillips for 1957.

== Programs ==
Phillips created (and co-created) radio and TV soap operas including:

- Painted Dreams (radio 1930–1932)
- Guiding Light (radio 1937–1956, television 1952–2009)
- The Road of Life (radio 1937–1959, television 1954)
- Young Dr. Malone (radio 1939–1960, television 1958–1963)
- The Brighter Day (radio 1948–1956, television 1954–1962)
- These Are My Children (1949)
- As the World Turns (1956–2010) a sister show to Guiding Light (character crossovers)
- Another World (1964–1999) a sister show to As the World Turns (character crossovers)
- Our Private World (1965) a spinoff of As The World Turns
- Love Is a Many Splendored Thing (1967–1973)

Phillips also was a creative consultant on Peyton Place (1964–69), and was an unofficial consultant on A World Apart, which was created by her adopted daughter Katherine. Phillips was also a story editor on Days of Our Lives.

== Death ==
Irna Phillips died in Chicago on December 23, 1973, aged 72, from undisclosed causes. Harding Lemay wrote her obituary and he and his wife paid to have the words placed in The New York Times. Agnes Nixon learned of Phillips' death when she called her mentor to wish her well on Christmas Day. According to Nixon, Phillips had not wanted anyone to know that she had died.. She is buried in Memorial Park Cemetery in Skokie, Illinois.

== Credits ==
=== Radio ===
- Painted Dreams (1930–1943)
- Today's Children (1932–1938, 1943–1950)
- Judy and Jane (1932–1943)
- Woman in White (1938–1942)
- Joyce Jordan, Girl Interne (aka Joyce Jordan, M.D.) (1938–1955)
- The Road of Life (1937–1959)
- The Guiding Light (1937–1956)
- The Right to Happiness (1939–1960)
- Lonely Women (1942–1943)
- Masquerade (1948–1952)
- The Brighter Day (1948–1956)

=== Television ===
- These Are My Children (1949)
- Guiding Light (1952–2009)
- The Brighter Day (1954–1962)
- The Road of Life (1954)
- As the World Turns (1956–2010)
- Another World (1964–1999)
- Our Private World (1965)
- Days of Our Lives (1965–present)
- Love Is a Many Splendored Thing (1967–1973)
- A World Apart (1970–1971)
