= Mobile soap opera =

Soap opera developed for the mobile phone platform

A mobile soap opera is a soap opera developed for the mobile phone platform. The series can be viewed by mobile phones, the internet or MSN Messenger. Subscribers register online and receive two episodes a day, each episode consisting of about 6 or 7 pictures and accompanying text.

Mobile soap opera was first introduced into the Netherlands in 2003 with the series Jong Zuid. An Australian version of Jong Zuid called Random Place was launched on 22 April 2005. Featuring a cast of Australian Olympians, reality TV & soaps stars including Libby Lenton, Leisal Jones, Nicole Sanderson, Tatiana Gregorieva, Riki Lee Coulter, Amy Erbacher, and starred Marty Worrall, & Daniel O'Connor. Random Place was sponsored by Vodafone and produced by Bill Roberts.

Another mobile Soap FanTESStic produced in Spain by Telefónica, was translated and sold into five other markets including UK, Chile & Australia (on April 8, 2005). The concept was awarded the Best Mobile Application Award Europe 2003.

== See also ==
- Web series
- Webnovela
- Duanju
