= Painted Dreams =

Radio soap opera

- Genre: Soap opera
- Country of origin: United States
- Language(s): English
- Home station: WGN
- Starring: Irna Phillips
- Created by: Irna Phillips
- Written by: Irna Phillips
- Original release: 1930 – 1943
- Audio format: Mono

Irna Phillips, creator of Painted Dreams

Painted Dreams is an American radio soap opera that premiered on WGN radio, Chicago, on October 20, 1930 and last aired in July 1943. It is widely considered by scholars of the genre to be the first daytime soap opera or drama-by-installment serial. The first to be broadcast in daytime over a radio network would be Clara, Lu 'n Em, two years later.

In 1930 radio station WGN asked Irna Phillips, who worked for them as an actress, to create a 15-minute daily show "about a family," to air during the day. Painted Dreams was the result.

Phillips wrote and acted in the show until 1932 when she asked WGN to sell the show to a national broadcaster. When they refused, Phillips sued, claiming the show was her property. The dispute was finally settled in 1938, and the show was acquired by CBS. Meanwhile, Phillips had left WGN in 1932, creating Today's Children for rival station WMAQ with virtually the same plot premises and characters.

== Plot ==
Phillips' storyline followed the relationship of Irish-American widow Mother Moynihan and her unmarried daughter. Listeners in 1931 heard this dialogue in episode 25:

(Kitchen: Irene and Sue arguing. Mrs. Moynihan preparing breakfast.)
IRENE: I tell you, Sue, it won’t work. I’ve never worn that shade of orchid in all my life. I’d look like a perfect washout. Besides, that’s your very best special occasion dress. I wouldn’t think of taking it.
SUE: Don’t be silly. A wedding is a special occasion, isn’t it? And as long as I won’t need to wear it, you might just as well. If you’re a bridesmaid, you’ve got to look the part, kid.
IRENE: But I don’t look good in that color. I’d look faded or something.
SUE: Cracked ice! You can’t tell. You’ve never had it on. Gee, with gold slippers and a gold turban hat, you’d be a wow! Wouldn’t she, Mrs. Moynihan?
MRS.: Won't you be wearing it, Sue?
SUE: Why no; there's no reasons for my dressing up. I'm not in the wedding party. And I think that it would be just right for Irene, if there were a few tucks taken in around the waist. Anyway, it would save her from buying a dress.
IRENE: Well, who says I don't want to buy a dress? It's about time I was getting a new formal, anyhow. I haven't got a rag that's fit to be seen.

Phillips occasionally played the lead of Mother Moynihan, as did Bess Flynn, who was a member of the show's writing team. Flynn, born August 18, 1899, in Tama, Iowa, went on to script three other soap operas: We, the Abbotts, Bachelor's Children and Martha Webster (originally titled Life Begins). In addition to performing the title role on Martha Webster, she also portrayed the annoying maid Tilda on The Gumps.

Kay Chase portrayed Joyce in the series. Other actresses heard on it included Mary Afflick and Alice Hill.

In the fall of 1933 orphan Joe Giolotti was added as a character in the story. Joyce brought him into the Moynihan household after his mother died, creating "an interesting series of radio episodes".

== See also ==
- List of radio soaps
