= Soap opera =

Radio or TV serial

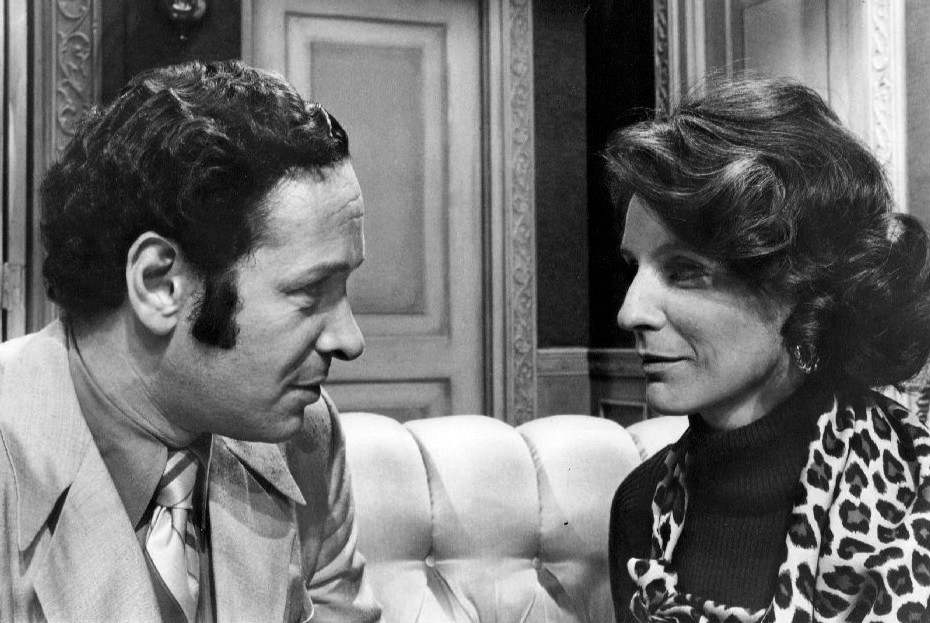
Publicity photo of married couple Nick Davis (Larry Keith) and Anne Tyler Davis Martin (Joanna Miles) in the American soap opera All My Children (1970)

A soap opera (also called a daytime drama or soap) is a genre of a long-running radio or television serial, frequently characterized by melodrama, ensemble casts, and sentimentality. The term soap opera originated from radio dramas' original sponsorship by soap manufacturers. The term was preceded by horse opera, a derogatory term for low-budget Westerns. Some authorities exclude short-running serial dramas from their definition.

BBC Radio's The Archers, first broadcast in 1950, is the world's longest-running soap opera. The longest-running television soap opera is Coronation Street, which was first broadcast on ITV in 1960.

According to Albert Moran, one of the defining features that make a television program a soap opera is "that form of television that works with a continuous open narrative. Each episode ends with a promise that the storyline is to be continued in another episode". In 2012, Los Angeles Times columnist Robert Lloyd wrote of daily dramas:

Although melodramatically eventful, soap operas such as this also have a luxury of space that makes them seem more naturalistic; indeed, the economics of the form demand long scenes, and conversations that a 22-episodes-per-season weekly series might dispense with in half a dozen lines of dialogue may be drawn out, as here, for pages. You spend more time even with the minor characters; the apparent villains grow less apparently villainous.

Soap opera storylines run concurrently, intersect and lead into further developments. An individual episode of a soap opera will generally switch between several concurrent narrative threads that may at times interconnect and affect one another or may run entirely independently of each other. Episodes may feature some of the show's storylines, but not always all of them. Especially in daytime serials and those that are broadcast each weekday, there is some rotation of both storyline and actors, so any given storyline or actor will appear in some but usually not all of a week's worth of episodes. Soap operas seldom conclude all their storylines at the same time. When one story thread ends, there are several others at differing stages of development. Soap opera episodes typically end on some sort of cliffhanger, as does the season finale (if a soap incorporates a break between seasons), the tension only to be resolved when the show returns for the start of a new yearly broadcast.

Evening soap operas and those that air at a rate of one episode per week are more likely to feature the entire cast in each episode and present all storylines. Evening soap operas and serials that run for only part of the year tend to bring things to a dramatic end-of-season cliffhanger.

In 1976, Time magazine described American daytime television as "TV's richest market", noting the loyalty of the soap opera fan base and the expansion of several half-hour series into hour-long broadcasts to maximise advertising revenues. At that time, many prime time series lost money, while daytime serials earned profits several times more than their production costs. The issue's cover notably featured its first daytime soap stars, Bill Hayes and Susan Seaforth Hayes of Days of Our Lives, a married couple whose onscreen and real-life romance was widely covered by both the soap opera magazines and the mainstream press at large.

== Origin and history of the genre ==
The first program generally considered to be a "soap opera" or daytime serial by scholars of the genre is Painted Dreams, written by and starring Irna Phillips, which premiered on WGN radio Chicago, on October 20, 1930. It was regularly broadcast in a daytime time slot, where most listeners would be housewives; thus, the shows were aimed at – and consumed by – a predominantly female audience. Clara, Lu, 'n Em would become the first network radio serial of the type when it aired on the NBC Blue Network at 10:30 p.m. Eastern Time on January 27, 1931. Although it did not make the move until February 15, 1932, Clara, Lu 'n Em would become the first network serial of the type to move to a weekday daily timeslot; as such, it also became the first network daytime serial.

== Plots and storylines ==
The main characteristics that define soap operas are "an emphasis on family life, personal relationships, sexual dramas, emotional and moral conflicts; some coverage of topical issues; set in familiar domestic interiors with only occasional excursions into new locations". Fitting in with these characteristics, most soap operas follow the lives of a group of characters who live or work in a particular place, or focus on a large extended family. The storylines follow the day-to-day activities and personal relationships of these characters. "Soap narratives, like those of film melodramas, are marked by what Steve Neale has described as 'chance happenings, coincidences, missed meetings, sudden conversions, last-minute rescues and revelations, deus ex machina endings.'" These elements may be found across the gamut of soap operas, from EastEnders to Dallas.

In many soap operas, in particular daytime serials in the United States, the characters are frequently attractive, seductive, glamorous and wealthy. Soap operas from the United Kingdom and Australia tend to focus on more everyday characters and situations and are frequently set in working-class environments. Many of the soaps produced in those two countries explore social realist storylines such as family discord, marriage breakdown or financial problems. Both British and Australian soap operas feature comedic elements, often affectionate comic stereotypes such as the gossip or the grumpy old man, presented as a comic foil to the emotional turmoil that surrounds them. This diverges from American soap operas where such comedy is rare. British soap operas frequently make a claim to presenting "reality" or purport to have a "realistic" style. British soap operas also frequently foreground their geographic location as a key defining feature of the show while depicting and capitalising on the exotic appeal of the stereotypes connected to the location. As examples, EastEnders focuses on the tough and grim life in the East End of London; Coronation Street and its characters exhibit the stereotypical characteristic of "northern straight talking".

If we want to blend an actor back into a show, there's always a way. You can generally find a way to twist and manipulate something. You rarely see a dead body, but hey, even if you do, he or she can always come back to play the evil identical twin.

— Marlena Laird in 1992, during her time as a line producer and director for General Hospital.

Romance, secret relationships, extramarital affairs, and genuine hate have been the basis for many soap opera storylines. In American daytime serials, the most popular soap opera characters, and the most popular storylines, often involved a romance of the sort presented in paperback romance novels. Soap opera storylines weave intricate, convoluted and sometimes confusing tales of characters who have affairs, meet mysterious strangers and fall in love, and who commit adultery, all of which keeps audiences hooked on the unfolding story. Crimes such as kidnapping, assault (sometimes sexual), and even murder may go unpunished if the perpetrator is to be retained in the ongoing story.

Australian and British soap operas also feature a significant proportion of romance storylines. In Russia, most popular serials explore the "romantic quality" of criminal and/or oligarch life.

In soap opera storylines, previously unknown children, siblings and twins (including the evil variety) of established characters often emerge to upset and reinvigorate the set of relationships examined by the series. Unexpected calamities disrupt weddings, childbirths, and other major life events with unusual frequency.

As in comic books – another popular form of linear storytelling pioneered in the United States during the 20th century – a character's death is not guaranteed to be permanent. On The Bold and the Beautiful, Taylor Hayes (Hunter Tylo) was shown to flatline and have a funeral. Once Tylo reprised her character in 2005, a retcon explained that Taylor had actually gone into a coma.

Stunts and complex physical action are largely absent, especially from daytime serials. Such story events often take place off-screen and are referred to in dialogue instead of being shown. This is because stunts or action scenes are difficult to adequately depict without complex movements, multiple takes, and post-production editing. When episodes were broadcast live, post-production work was impossible. Though all serials have long switched to being taped, extensive post-production work and multiple takes, while possible, are not feasible due to the tight taping schedules and low budgets.

== United States ==
=== Daytime serials on television ===
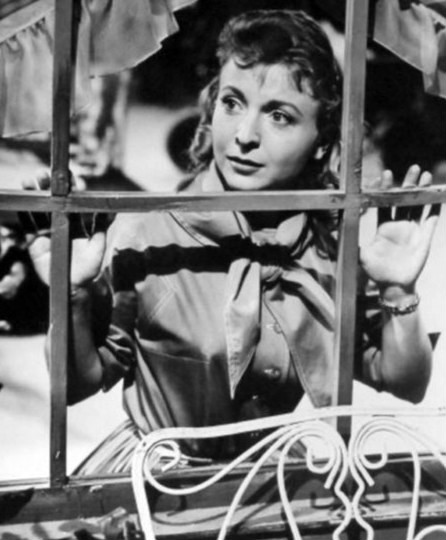
Publicity photo of Rosemary Prinz as Penny Hughes from As the World Turns

The first daytime TV soap opera in the United States was These Are My Children in 1949, though earlier melodramas had aired in the evenings as once-a-week programs. Soap operas quickly became a fixture of American daytime television in the early 1950s, joined by game shows, sitcom reruns and talk shows.

In 1988, H. Wesley Kenney, who at the time served as the executive producer of General Hospital, said to The New York Times:

I think people like stories that continue so they can relate to these people. They become like a family, and the viewer becomes emotionally involved. There seem to be two attitudes by viewers. One, that the stories are similar to what happened to them in real life, or two, thank goodness that isn't me.

— H. Wesley Kenney

Many long-running American soap operas established particular environments for their stories. The Doctors and General Hospital, in the beginning, told stories almost exclusively from inside the confines of a hospital. As the World Turns dealt heavily with Chris Hughes' law practice and the travails of his wife Nancy who, tired of being "the loyal housewife" in the 1970s, became one of the first older women on the American serials to enter the workforce. Guiding Light dealt with Bert Bauer (Charita Bauer) and her alcoholic husband Bill, and their endless marital troubles. When Bert's status shifted to caring mother and town matriarch, her children's marital troubles were showcased. Search for Tomorrow mostly told its story through the eyes of Joanne Gardner (Mary Stuart). Even when stories revolved around other characters, Joanne was frequently a key player in their storylines. Days of Our Lives initially focused on Dr. Tom Horton and his steadfast wife Alice. The show later branched out to focus more on their five children. The Edge of Night featured as its central character Mike Karr, a police detective (later an attorney), and largely dealt with organized crime. The Young and the Restless first focused on two families, the prosperous Brooks family with four daughters, and the working-class Foster family of a single working mother with three children. Its storylines explored realistic problems including cancer, mental illness, poverty, and infidelity.

In contrast, Dark Shadows (1966–1971), Port Charles (1997–2003) and Passions (1999–2008) featured supernatural characters and dealt with fantasy and horror storylines. Their characters included vampires, witches, ghosts, goblins, and angels.

The American soap opera Guiding Light (originally titled The Guiding Light until 1975) started as a radio drama in January 1937 and subsequently began transitioning to television in June 1952; the television and radio editions of the serial continued to broadcast concurrently until the latter version ended production in 1956. With the exception of several years in the late 1940s, during which creator Irna Phillips was involved in a dispute with Procter & Gamble, Guiding Light was heard or seen nearly every weekday from 1937 to 2009, making it the longest story ever told in a broadcast medium.

Originally, serials were broadcast as 15-minute installments each weekday in daytime slots. In 1956, As the World Turns and The Edge of Night, both produced by Procter & Gamble Productions, debuted as the first half-hour soap operas on the CBS television network. All soap operas broadcast half-hour episodes by the end of the 1960s. With increased popularity in the 1970s, most soap operas had expanded to an hour in length by the end of the decade (Another World even expanded to 90 minutes for a short time from 1979 to 1980). More than half of the serials had expanded to one-hour episodes by 1980. As of 2025, four of the five American serials air one-hour episodes each weekday; only The Bold and the Beautiful airs 30-minute episodes.

Soap operas were broadcast live from the studio, creating what many at the time regarded as a feeling similar to that of a stage play. As nearly all soap operas were originated at that time from New York City, a number of soap actors were also accomplished stage actors who performed live theater during breaks from their soap roles. In the 1960s and 1970s, new serials such as General Hospital, Days of Our Lives, and The Young and the Restless were produced in Los Angeles. Their success made the West Coast a viable alternative to New York-produced soap operas, which were becoming more costly to perform. By the early 1970s, nearly all soap operas had transitioned to being taped. As the World Turns and The Edge of Night were the last to make the switch, in 1975.

Port Charles used the practice of running 13-week "story arcs," in which the main events of the arc are played out and wrapped up over the 13 weeks, although some storylines did continue over more than one arc. According to the 2006 Preview issue of Soap Opera Digest, it was briefly discussed that all ABC shows might do telenovela arcs, but this was rejected.

Though American daytime soap operas are not generally rerun by their networks, occasionally they are rebroadcast elsewhere; CBS and ABC have made exceptions to this, airing older episodes (either those aired earlier in the current season or those aired years prior) on major holidays when special event programming is not scheduled or because of last-minute deferrals of scheduled episodes to the following day because of breaking news coverage. (Temporary production stoppages caused by the COVID-19 pandemic similarly resulted in CBS and ABC airing older reruns of The Young and the Restless, The Bold and the Beautiful and General Hospital during the Spring and Summer of 2020 in order to ration first-run episodes and, eventually, to fill airtime after the programs ran out of new episodes to broadcast; Days of Our Lives, which produces its episodes roughly eight months ahead of their initial broadcast, did not resort to airing older episodes during this time as it had a larger first-run episode backlog.) Early episodes of Dark Shadows were rerun on PBS member stations in the early 1970s after the show's cancellation, and the entire series (except for a single missing episode) was rerun on the Sci-Fi Channel in the 1990s. After The Edge of Night's 1984 cancellation, reruns of the show's final five years were shown late nights on USA Network from 1985 to 1989. On January 20, 2000, a digital cable and satellite network dedicated to the genre, Soapnet, began re-airing soaps that aired on ABC, NBC and CBS.

Newer broadcast networks launched since the late 1980s (such as Fox) and cable television networks have largely eschewed offering soap operas on their daytime schedules, instead running syndicated programming and reruns. No cable television outlet has produced its own daytime serial, although DirecTV's The 101 Network took over existing serial Passions, continuing production for one season; while TBS and CBN Cable Network respectively aired their own soap operas, The Catlins (a primetime soap that utilized the daily episode format of its daytime counterparts) and Another Life (a soap that combined standard serial drama with religious overtones), during the 1980s. Fox, the fourth "major network", carried a short-lived daytime soap Tribes in 1990. Yet, other than this and a couple of pilot attempts, Fox mainly stayed away from daytime soaps, and has not attempted them since their ascension to major-network status in 1994 (it did later attempt a series of daily prime time soaps from 2006 to 2007, which aired on newly created sister network MyNetworkTV, but the experiment was largely a failure after disappointing ratings).

Due to the masses of episodes produced for a series, release of soap operas to DVD (a popular venue for distribution of current and vintage television series) is considered impractical. With the exception of occasional specials, daytime soap operas are notable by their absence from DVD release schedules (an exception being the supernatural soap opera, Dark Shadows, which did receive an essentially complete release on both VHS and DVD; the single lost episode #1219 is reconstructed by means of an off-the-air audio recording, still images, and recap material from adjacent episodes).

==== Performers ====
See List of longest-serving soap opera actors

Soap opera performers in the United States are typically divided into two main groups: primary characters (sometimes referred to as "contract players" – as their portrayers signed contracts of employment – or leading characters) and secondary characters (sometimes referred to as recurring characters). These two groups of characters make up the vast majority of the people who appear on any given soap. There are also characters who appear only for a short time as dictated by a specific storyline, and even characters who may only get a first name and no fleshed-out character history with little dialogue (these are sometimes referred to as "under-5s" since they receive under five lines of dialogue in each episode).

Due to the longevity of these shows, it is not uncommon for a single character to be played by multiple actors. The key character of Mike Karr on The Edge of Night was played by three actors.

Conversely, several actors have remained playing the same character for many years, or decades even. Helen Wagner played Hughes family matriarch Nancy Hughes on American soap As the World Turns from its April 2, 1956, debut through her death in May 2010. She is listed in the Guinness Book of World Records as the actor with the longest uninterrupted performance in a single role. A number of performers played roles for 20 years or longer, occasionally on more than one show. Rachel Ames played Audrey Hardy on both General Hospital and Port Charles from 1964 until 2007 and returned in 2009. Susan Lucci played Erica Kane in All My Children from the show's debut in January 1970 until it ended its network television run on ABC on September 23, 2011. Erika Slezak played Victoria Lord #3 on One Life to Live from 1971 until the show ended its network television run on ABC on January 13, 2012, and resumed the role in its short-lived online revival on April 29, 2013.

Other actors have played several characters on different shows. Millette Alexander, Bernard Barrow, Doris Belack, David Canary, Judith Chapman, Keith Charles, Jordan Charney, Joan Copeland, Nicolas Coster, Jacqueline Courtney, Augusta Dabney, Louis Edmonds, Don Hastings, Larry Haines, Vincent Irizarry, Lenore Kasdorf, Teri Keane, Lois Kibbee, John Loprieno, Lori March, Maeve McGuire, Robert Milli, James Mitchell, Lee Patterson, Christopher Pennock, Antony Ponzini, William Prince, Rosemary Prinz, Louise Shaffer, Mary Stuart, Richard Thomas, Diana van der Vlis, Mary K. Wells, Lesley Woods and Michael Zaslow, among many others, have all played multiple soap roles.

==== Evolution of the daytime serial ====
For several decades, most daytime soap operas concentrated on family and marital discord, legal drama and romance. The action rarely left interior settings, and many shows were set in fictional, medium-sized Midwestern towns.

Social issue storylines were typically verboten when soaps were starting, due to heavy network-imposed censorship at that time, but writer and producer Agnes Nixon introduced these storylines slowly but surely, first in 1962 when the matriarch of The Guiding Light, Bert Bauer, developed uterine cancer (as the actress, Charita Bauer, had been diagnosed with the same illness in real life). The storyline encouraged many women to get pap smears and the CBS mailroom in New York City received a then-record amount of fan mail wishing Bauer (both Bert and Charita) well. Nixon would go on to tell many socially relevant storylines on her soaps One Life to Live and All My Children in the late 1960s and into the 1970s.

Exterior shots were slowly incorporated into the series The Edge of Night and Dark Shadows. Unlike many earlier serials that were set in fictional towns, The Best of Everything and Ryan's Hope were set in a real-world location, New York City.

The first exotic location shoot was made by All My Children, to St. Croix in 1978. Many other soap operas planned lavish storylines after the success of the All My Children shoot. Soap operas Another World and Guiding Light both went to St. Croix in 1980, the former show culminating a long-running storyline between popular characters Mac, Rachel and Janice, and the latter to serve as an exotic setting for Alan Spaulding and Rita Bauer's torrid affair. Search for Tomorrow taped for two weeks in Hong Kong in 1981. Later that year, some of the cast and crew ventured to Jamaica to tape a love consummation storyline between the characters of Garth and Kathy.

During the 1980s, perhaps as a reaction to the evening drama series that were gaining high ratings, daytime serials began to incorporate action and adventure storylines, more big-business intrigue, and an increased emphasis on youthful romance.

One of the most popular couples was Luke Spencer and Laura Webber on General Hospital. Luke and Laura helped to attract both male and female fans. Even actress Elizabeth Taylor was a fan and at her own request was given a guest role in Luke and Laura's wedding episode. Luke and Laura's popularity led to other soap producers striving to reproduce this success by attempting to create supercouples of their own.

With increasingly bizarre action storylines coming into vogue, Luke and Laura saved the world from being frozen, brought a mobster down by finding his black book in a left-handed boy statue, and helped a princess find her Aztec treasure in Mexico. Other soap operas attempted similar adventure storylines, often featuring footage shot on location – frequently in exotic locales.

During the 1990s, the mob, action and adventure stories fell out of favor with producers, due to generally declining ratings for daytime soap operas at the time. With the resultant budget cuts, soap operas were no longer able to go on expensive location shoots overseas as they were able to do in the 1980s. During that decade, soap operas increasingly focused on younger characters and social issues, such as Erica Kane's drug addiction on All My Children, the re-emergence of Viki Lord's dissociative identity disorder on One Life to Live, and Stuart Chandler dealing with his wife Cindy dying of AIDS on All My Children. Other social issues included cancer, rape, abortion and racism.

Several shows during the 1990s and 2000s incorporated supernatural and science fiction elements into their storylines in an attempt to boost their ratings. One of the main characters on the earlier soap opera Dark Shadows was Barnabas Collins, a vampire, and One Life to Live featured an angel named Virgil. Both shows featured characters who traveled to and from the past. In 1995, Days of our Lives featured a storyline in which fan favorite character Marlena Evans was possessed by the devil (which was revisited in 2021 with the devil possessing several of her relatives as well), and in 1998, Guiding Light featured a cloning storyline involving legacy character Reva Shayne.

==== Traditional grammar of daytime serials ====
Modern American daytime soap operas largely stay true to the original soap opera format. The duration and format of storylines and the visual grammar employed by American daytime serials set them apart from soap operas in other countries and from evening soap operas. Stylistically, British and Australian soap operas, which are usually produced for early evening timeslots, fall somewhere in between American daytime and evening soap operas. Similar to American daytime soap operas, British and Australian serials are shot on videotape, and the cast and storylines are rotated across the week's episodes so that each cast member will appear in some but not all episodes. British and Australian soap operas move through storylines at a faster rate than daytime serials, making them closer to American evening soap operas in this regard.

American daytime soap operas feature stylistic elements that set them apart from other shows:

- A construct unique to American daytime serials is the format where the action will cut between various conversations, returning to each at the precise moment it was left. This is the most significant distinction between American daytime soap operas and other forms of American television drama, which generally allow for narrative time to pass, off-screen, between the scenes depicted. On occasion, a character or characters involved a conversation earlier in that act may appear in a different setting later in the same act.
- In American daytime soap operas, scenes often end with a pregnant pause and a close-up on the character. There will be no dialogue for several seconds, while the music builds before cutting to a commercial or a new scene. This kind of segue is referred to in the industry as a "tag".
- The traditional three-point lighting set-up routinely used in filmmaking and television production is also used on daytime soap operas, sometimes with accentuated back lighting to lift actors out of the background. This is useful in programs like soap operas, which are shot on videotape in small interior sets. The backlight is frequently more subtle on filmed productions shot on location and in larger sets.
- Domestic interiors are often furnished with stained wood wall panels and furniture, and items of brown leather furniture. This is to give a sumptuous and luxurious look suggesting the wealth of the characters. Daytime serials often foreground other sumptuous elements of set decoration; presenting a "mid-shot of characters viewed through a frame of lavish floral displays, glittering crystal decanters or gleaming antique furniture".
- Few American daytime soap operas routinely feature location or exterior-shot footage (Guiding Light began shooting many of its scenes outdoors in its final two seasons). Often an outdoor locale is recreated in the studio, although in recent years, The Bold and the Beautiful and General Hospital have taped certain exterior scenes within the grounds of their main soundstages. Australian and British daily soap operas invariably feature a certain amount of exterior-shot footage in every episode. This is usually shot in the same location and often on a purpose-built set, with new exterior locations for particular events.
- The visual quality of a soap opera is usually lower than prime time American television drama series due to the lower budgets and quicker production times. This is also because soap operas are recorded on videotape using a multi-camera setup, unlike prime time productions that are usually shot on film and frequently use the single-camera shooting style. Because of the lower resolution of video images, and also because of the emotional situations portrayed in soap operas, daytime serials make heavy use of close-up shots. Programs in the United States did not make the full conversion to high-definition broadcasting until September 2011, when The Bold and the Beautiful became the last soap to convert to the format; One Life to Live was an exception to this, as it continued to be produced and broadcast in standard definition – albeit in the 16:9 aspect ratio – until the end of its run on ABC in January 2012. Beyond the Gates, being the first daytime soap opera to debut in the modern high-definition era, broadcast in HD from its premiere in February 2025.
- Soap operas have idiosyncratic blocking techniques. In one common situation, a romantically involved couple starts a conversation face to face, then one character will turn 180° and face away from the other character while the conversation continues. This allows both characters to appear together in a single shot, and with both of them facing the audience. This is unrealistic in real life and is not frequently seen in film or on television outside American daytime serials, but it is an accepted soap opera convention, sometimes referred to as a "two shot West".
- Because of the escapist tone of the genre and due to the large number of cast members employed by each program (usually totaling around 30 to 35 actors for hour-long soaps, and 15 to 25 for those lasting a half hour), daytime soap operas have traditionally listed all contract cast members (as well as recurring and guest actors) during the closing credits, instead of the opening title sequence. Until the 1990s, these series listed only a few of the principal actors at the end of the episode in certain episodes airing on Monday through Thursdays. Because of the aforementioned reasons, an extended credit sequence featuring a complete list of the show's cast members, listed alongside the characters they portray, typically airs at least once per week (usually on the Friday show; although since the 2000s, most soap operas, with General Hospital as one of the few exceptions, have randomized the day the cast list is shown). The Young and the Restless became the first American daytime soap to include the names of its contract actors in the opening credits in 1999 (although due to the large number of actors on contract with the show at one time, it utilizes different versions of the title sequence with a randomized list of about nine actors, increased from the seven listed in each version until 2017). The Bold and the Beautiful listed its entire main cast (as well as some actors appearing on a recurring basis) from 2004 to 2017, with General Hospital following suit from 2010 to 2013; Beyond the Gates, beginning with its 2025 premiere, uses a similar alternating title sequence structure as The Young and the Restless, although uniform top billing is given to a handful of its primary lead actors. (As of 2025, The Young and the Restless and Beyond the Gates are the only American daytime soap operas that list the names of their main cast during both their opening titles and extended closing credit sequence.)

==== Decline ====
===== Statistics and trends =====
Soap opera ratings have significantly fallen in the U.S. since the 2000s. Experts believe that this is due to their failure to attract younger demographics, the tendency of modern audiences to have shorter attention spans, and the rise of reality television in the 1990s. Nevertheless, Internet streaming services do offer materials in the serial format, a legacy of soap operas. However, the availability of such on-demand platforms saw to it that soap operas would never again be the cultural phenomenon they were in the twentieth century, especially among the younger generations, not least because cliffhangers could no longer capture the imagination of the viewers the way they did in the past, when television shows were available as scheduled, not on demand.

From September 2013 to February 2025, only four daytime soap operas – General Hospital, Days of Our Lives, The Young and the Restless and The Bold and the Beautiful – were still in production, down from a total of 12 soaps broadcast during the 1990–91 season and a high of 19 in the 1969–70 season; of those, three aired between two broadcast networks and one on streaming. This period marked the first time since 1953 that there were only four soap operas on the air. The Young and the Restless, the highest-rated soap opera, had fewer than 5 million daily viewers as of February 2012, a number exceeded by several non-scripted programs such as Judge Judy. Circulations of soap opera magazines have decreased and most have even ceased publication; Soap Opera Digest, the last remaining weekly print magazine devoted to the genre, switched to a quarterly "special issue" publication in October 2023, although it continues to publish daily articles and episode summaries online. Soapnet, which largely aired soap opera reruns, began to be phased out in 2012 for the children's cable channel Disney Jr., and fully ceased operations the following year. The Daytime Emmy Awards, which honor soap operas and other daytime shows, moved from prime time network television to smaller cable channels in 2012, then failed to get any TV broadcast at all in 2014, 2016, and 2017; the ceremony would eventually return to broadcast television in 2020.

Several of the most established soaps on American television ended between 2009 and 2012. The longest-running drama in television and radio history, Guiding Light, barely reached 2.1 million daily viewers in 2009 and ended on September 18 of that year, after a 72-year run (including radio). As the World Turns aired its final episode on September 17, 2010, after a 54-year run. Until it ventured back into the genre in 2024, As the World Turns was the last of 20 soap operas produced by Procter & Gamble, the soap and consumer goods company from which the genre got its name. As the World Turns and Guiding Light were also among the last of the soaps that originated from New York City. All My Children, another New York–based soap, moved its production out to Los Angeles in an effort to reduce costs and raise sagging ratings; however, both it and One Life to Live, each with a 40-year-plus run, were cancelled in 2011. All My Children aired its network finale in September 2011, with One Life to Live following suit in January 2012. Both All My Children and One Life to Live were briefly revived online in 2013, before being cancelled again amid creative and intellectual property issues between ABC and Prospect Park (the production company that acquired rights for both serials in a sub-licensing deal with ABC parent Disney), ending in September that same year. In 2019, production of Days of Our Lives was put on "indefinite hiatus" and all of the cast's contracts were terminated, raising concerns within soap publications that cancellation would ensue, though the show was later renewed through September 2021. In 2022, NBC announced that Days of Our Lives would be moved exclusively to its streaming service, Peacock, making NBC the first of the Big Three networks not to air any daytime soap operas.

In March 2024, CBS Studios and NAACP Ventures, in partnership with P&G Studios announced that a new soap opera for CBS tentatively titled The Gates, which would be the first soap opera since Generations to feature a primarily African American cast, was in development. On April 15, 2024, CBS ordered The Gates (later retitled Beyond the Gates) to series; it premiered on February 24, 2025, taking the timeslot previously occupied by panel talk show The Talk (the timeslot successor of As the World Turns, which would end its 15-season run on December 20, 2024), making it the first new daytime soap opera to premiere on a major broadcast network since NBC's Passions in 1999.

===== Causes =====
New generations of potential viewers were not raised watching soap operas with their mothers, leaving the shows' long and complex storylines foreign to younger audiences. As viewers age, ratings continue to drop among young adult women, the demographic group for which soap opera advertisers pay the most. Those who might watch in workplace breakrooms are not counted, as Nielsen does not track television viewing outside the home. The rise of cable and the Internet has also provided new sources of entertainment during the day. The genre's decline has additionally been attributed to reality television displacing soap operas as TV's dominant form of melodrama. An early term for the reality TV genre was docu-soap. A precursor to reality TV, the televised 1994–95 O. J. Simpson murder case, both preempted and competed with an entire season of soaps, transforming viewing habits and leaving soap operas with 10 percent fewer viewers after the trial ended.

Daytime programming alternatives such as talk shows, game shows, and court shows cost up to 50% less to produce than scripted dramas, making those formats more profitable and attractive to networks, even if they receive the same or slightly lower ratings than soap operas. A network may even prefer to return a time slot to its local stations to keeping a soap opera with disappointing ratings on the air, as was the case with Sunset Beach and Port Charles. Compounding the financial pressure on scripted programming in the 2007–2010 period was a decline in advertising during the Great Recession, which led shows to reduce their budgets and cast sizes. In addition to these external factors, a litany of production decisions has been cited by soap opera fans as contributing to the genre's decline, such as clichéd plots, a lack of diversity that narrowed audience appeal, and the elimination of core families.

==== Current ====
Soap	Network	Premiered	Switched to color	Expanded to hour	First HDTV broadcast
Beyond the Gates	CBS	February 24, 2025	From the start	From the start	From the start
The Bold and the Beautiful	CBS	March 23, 1987	From the start	N/A	September 7, 2011
Days of Our Lives	Peacock	November 8, 1965	From the start	April 21, 1975	November 8, 2010
General Hospital	ABC	April 1, 1963	October 30, 1967	January 16, 1978	April 23, 2009
The Young and the Restless	CBS	March 26, 1973	From the start	February 4, 1980	June 27, 2001

==== Former ====
Soap	Network	Premiere	Finale	Switched to color	Expanded to hour	First HDTV broadcast
All My Children	ABC	January 5, 1970	September 23, 2011	From the start	April 25, 1977	February 3, 2010
Another World	NBC	May 4, 1964	June 25, 1999	June 1966	January 6, 1975	N/A
As the World Turns	CBS	April 2, 1956	September 17, 2010	August 21, 1967	December 1, 1975	N/A
The Best of Everything	ABC	March 30, 1970	September 25, 1970	From the start	N/A	N/A
The Brighter Day	CBS	January 4, 1954	September 28, 1962	N/A	N/A	N/A
Capitol	CBS	March 29, 1982	March 20, 1987	From the start	N/A	N/A
The City	ABC	November 13, 1995	March 28, 1997	From the start	N/A	N/A
The Clear Horizon	CBS	July 11, 1960	June 15, 1962	N/A	N/A	N/A
Dark Shadows	ABC	June 27, 1966	April 2, 1971	August 11, 1967	N/A	N/A
The Doctors	NBC	April 1, 1963	December 31, 1982	October 17, 1966	N/A	N/A
The Edge of Night	CBS/ABC	April 2, 1956	December 28, 1984	September 11, 1967	N/A	N/A
The First Hundred Years	CBS	December 4, 1950	June 27, 1952	N/A	N/A	N/A
First Love	NBC	July 5, 1954	December 30, 1955	N/A	N/A	N/A
From These Roots	NBC	June 30, 1958	December 29, 1961	N/A	N/A	N/A
Full Circle	CBS	June 27, 1960	March 10, 1961	N/A	N/A	N/A
Generations	NBC	March 27, 1989	January 25, 1991	From the start	N/A	N/A
Golden Windows	NBC	July 5, 1954	April 1, 1955	N/A	N/A	N/A
Guiding Light	CBS	June 30, 1952	September 18, 2009	March 13, 1967	November 7, 1977	N/A
Hawkins Falls	NBC	June 7, 1950	July 1, 1955	N/A	N/A	N/A
Hidden Faces	NBC	December 30, 1968	June 27, 1969	From the start	N/A	N/A
How to Survive a Marriage	NBC	January 7, 1974	April 17, 1975	From the start	N/A	N/A
Love Is a Many Splendored Thing	CBS	September 18, 1967	March 23, 1973	From the start	N/A	N/A
Love of Life	CBS	September 24, 1951	February 1, 1980	March 13, 1967	N/A	N/A
Lovers and Friends/For Richer, For Poorer	NBC	January 3, 1977	September 29, 1978	From the start	N/A	N/A
Loving	ABC	June 26, 1983	November 10, 1995	From the start	N/A	N/A
Miss Susan	NBC	March 12, 1951	December 28, 1951	N/A	N/A	N/A
Never Too Young	ABC	September 27, 1965	June 24, 1966	N/A	N/A	N/A
The Nurses	ABC	September 27, 1965	March 31, 1967	N/A	N/A	N/A
One Life to Live	ABC	July 15, 1968	January 13, 2012	From the start	January 16, 1978	December 6, 2010 (EDTV)
Our Five Daughters	NBC	January 2, 1962	September 28, 1962	N/A	N/A	N/A
Passions	NBC	July 5, 1999	September 7, 2007	From the start	From the start	N/A
Port Charles	ABC	June 1, 1997	October 3, 2003	From the start	N/A	N/A
Portia Faces Life	CBS	July 5, 1954	March 18, 1955	N/A	N/A	N/A
Return to Peyton Place	NBC	April 3, 1972	January 4, 1974	From the start	N/A	N/A
Ryan's Hope	ABC	July 7, 1975	January 13, 1989	From the start	N/A	N/A
Santa Barbara	NBC	July 30, 1984	January 15, 1993	From the start	From the start	N/A
Search for Tomorrow	CBS/NBC	September 3, 1951	December 26, 1986	September 11, 1967	N/A	N/A
The Secret Storm	CBS	February 1, 1954	February 8, 1974	September 11, 1967	N/A	N/A
Somerset	NBC	March 30, 1970	December 31, 1976	From the start	N/A	N/A
Sunset Beach	NBC	January 5, 1997	December 31, 1999	From the start	From the start	N/A
Texas	NBC	August 4, 1980	December 31, 1982	From the start	From the start	N/A
These Are My Children	NBC	January 31, 1949	February 25, 1949	N/A	N/A	N/A
Three Steps to Heaven	NBC	June 27, 1960	March 10, 1961	N/A	N/A	N/A
Tribes	Fox	March 5, 1990	July 13, 1990	From the start	N/A	N/A
Where the Heart Is	CBS	September 8, 1969	March 23, 1973	From the start	N/A	N/A
A World Apart	ABC	March 30, 1970	June 25, 1971	From the start	N/A	N/A
The Young Marrieds	ABC	October 5, 1964	March 25, 1966	N/A	N/A	N/A

=== The primetime serial ===
Serials produced for prime-time slots have also found success. The first prime time soap opera was Faraway Hill (1946), which aired on October 2, 1946, on the now-defunct DuMont Television Network. Faraway Hill ran for 12 episodes and was primarily broadcast live, interspersed with short pre-recorded film clips and still photos to remind the audience of the previous week's episode.

The first long-running prime time soap opera was Peyton Place (1964–1969) on ABC. It was based in part on the eponymous 1957 film (which, in turn, was based on the 1956 novel).

The popularity of Peyton Place prompted the CBS network to spin off popular As the World Turns character Lisa Miller into her own evening soap opera, Our Private World (originally titled "The Woman Lisa" in its planning stages). Our Private World was broadcast from May to September 1965. The character of Lisa (and her portrayer Eileen Fulton) returned to As The World Turns after the series ended.

The structure of Peyton Place, with its episodic plots and long-running story arcs, set the mold for the prime time serials of the 1980s, when the format reached its pinnacle.

The successful prime time serials of the 1980s included Dallas, its spin-off Knots Landing, Dynasty, and Falcon Crest. These shows frequently dealt with wealthy families, and their personal and big-business travails. Common characteristics were sumptuous sets and costumes, complex storylines examining business schemes and intrigue, and spectacular disaster cliffhanger situations. Each of these series featured a wealthy, domineering, promiscuous, and passionate antagonist as a key character in the storyline, respectively, J. R. Ewing (Larry Hagman), Abby Cunningham (Donna Mills), Alexis Colby (Joan Collins), and Angela Channing (Jane Wyman). These villainous schemers became immensely popular figures that audiences "loved to hate".

Unlike daytime serials, which are shot on video in a studio using the multi-camera setup, these evening series were shot on film using a single camera setup, and featured substantial location-shot footage, often in picturesque locales. Dallas, its spin-off Knots Landing, and Falcon Crest all initially featured episodes with self-contained stories and specific guest stars who appeared in just that episode. Each story was completely resolved by the end of the episode, and there were no end-of-episode cliffhangers. After the first couple of seasons, all three shows changed their story format to that of a pure soap opera, with interwoven ongoing narratives that ran over several episodes. Dynasty featured this format throughout its run.

The soap opera's distinctive open plot structure and complex continuity were increasingly incorporated into American prime time television programs of the period. The first significant drama series to do this was Hill Street Blues. This series, produced by Steven Bochco, featured many elements borrowed from soap operas, such as an ensemble cast, multi-episode storylines, and extensive character development throughout the series. It and the later Cagney & Lacey overlaid the police series formula with ongoing narratives exploring the personal lives and interpersonal relationships of the regular characters. The success of these series prompted other drama series, such as St. Elsewhere and situation comedy series, to incorporate serialized stories and story structure to varying degrees.

The prime-time soap operas and drama series of the 1990s and 2000s, such as Beverly Hills, 90210, Melrose Place, Party of Five, The O.C., and Dawson's Creek, focused more on younger characters. In the 2000s, ABC began to revitalize the prime time soap opera format with shows such as Desperate Housewives, Grey's Anatomy, Brothers & Sisters, Ugly Betty, Private Practice, and more recently Revenge, Nashville, Scandal, Mistresses, and formerly Ringer, which its sister production company ABC Studios co-produced with CBS Television Studios for The CW. While not soaps in the traditional sense, these shows managed to appeal to wide audiences with their high drama mixed with humor, and are soap operas by definition. These successes led to NBC's launching serials, including Heroes and Friday Night Lights. The upstart MyNetworkTV, a sister network of Fox Broadcasting Company, launched a line of prime time telenovelas (a genre similar to soap operas in terms of content) upon its launch in September 2006, but discontinued its use of the format in August 2007 after disappointing ratings.

On June 13, 2012, Dallas, a continuation of the 1978 original series premiered on the cable network, TNT. The revived series, which was canceled after three seasons in 2014, delivered solid ratings for the channel, only losing viewership after the show's most established star, Larry Hagman, died midway through the series. In 2012, Nick at Nite debuted a primetime soap opera, Hollywood Heights, which aired episodes five nights a week (on Monday through Fridays) in a manner similar to a daytime soap opera, instead of the once-a-week episode output common of other prime time soaps. The series, which was an adaptation of the Mexican telenovela Alcanzar una estrella, suffered from low ratings (generally receiving less than 1 million viewers) and was later moved to sister cable channel TeenNick halfway through its run to burn off the remaining episodes.

In 2015, Fox debuted Empire, a prime time musical serial centering on the power struggle between family members within the titular recording company. Created by Lee Daniels and Danny Strong and led by Oscar nominees Terrence Howard and Taraji P. Henson, the drama premiered to high ratings. The show is strongly influenced by other works such as William Shakespeare's King Lear, James Goldman's The Lion in Winter and the 1980s soap opera Dynasty. Also in 2015, E! introduced The Royals, a series following the life and drama of a fictional English Royal family, which was also inspired by Dynasty (even featuring Joan Collins as the Queen's mother). In addition, ABC debuted a prime time soap opera Blood & Oil, following a young couple looking to make money off the modern-day Williston oil boom, premiering on September 27, 2015.

==== List of primetime serials ====
Soap	Network	Premiere	Finale	Number of seasons	Number of episodes
2000 Malibu Road	CBS	August 23, 1992	September 9, 1992	1	6
90210	The CW	September 2, 2008	May 13, 2013	5	114 (List of episodes)
American Heiress	MyNetworkTV	March 13, 2007	July 18, 2007	1	65 (List of episodes)
Army Wives	Lifetime	June 3, 2007	June 9, 2013	7	117 (List of episodes)
Bare Essence	NBC	February 15, 1983	June 13, 1983	1	11
Beacon Hill	CBS	August 25, 1975	November 4, 1975	1	13
Berrenger's	NBC	January 1, 1985	March 16, 1985	1	12
Beverly Hills, 90210	Fox	October 4, 1990	May 17, 2000	10	293 (List of episodes)
Blood & Oil	ABC	September 27, 2015	December 13, 2015	1	10 (List of episodes)
Brothers & Sisters	ABC	September 24, 2006	May 8, 2011	5	109; List of episodes)
Central Park West	CBS	September 13, 1995	June 28, 1996	2	21 (List of episodes)
Dallas (1978)	CBS	April 2, 1978	May 3, 1991	14	357 (List of episodes)
Dallas (2012)	TNT	June 13, 2012	September 22, 2014	3	40 (List of episodes)
Dark Shadows (1991)	NBC	January 13, 1991	March 22, 1991	1	12 (List of episodes)
Dawson's Creek	The WB	January 20, 1998	May 14, 2003	6	128 (List of episodes)
Deception	NBC	January 7, 2013	March 18, 2013	1	11 (List of episodes)
Desire	MyNetworkTV	September 5, 2006	December 5, 2006	1	65 (List of episodes)
Desperate Housewives	ABC	October 3, 2004	May 13, 2012	8	180 (List of episodes)
Devious Maids	Lifetime	June 23, 2013	August 8, 2016	4	49 (List of episodes)
Dynasty (1981)	ABC	January 12, 1981	May 11, 1989	9	220 (List of episodes)
Dynasty (2017)	The CW	October 11, 2017	September 16, 2022	5	108 (List of episodes)
Empire	Fox	January 7, 2015	April 21, 2020	6	97 (List of episodes)
Falcon Crest	CBS	December 4, 1981	May 17, 1990	9	227 (List of episodes)
Faraway Hill	Dumont Television Network	October 2, 1946	December 18, 1946	N/A	N/A
Fashion House	MyNetworkTV	September 5, 2006	December 5, 2006	1	65 (List of episodes)
Flamingo Road	NBC	May 12, 1980	May 4, 1982	2	38 (List of episodes)
Filthy Rich	Fox	September 21, 2020	November 30, 2020	1	10 (List of episodes)
Friday Night Lights	NBC	October 3, 2006	February 9, 2011	5	76 (List of episodes)
GCB	ABC	March 4, 2012	May 6, 2012	1	10 (List of episodes)
Glitter	ABC	September 13, 1984	December 25, 1984	1	14
Gossip Girl	The CW	September 19, 2007	December 17, 2012	6	121 (List of episodes)
Grand Hotel	ABC	June 17, 2019	September 9, 2019	1	13 (List of episodes)
Grey's Anatomy	ABC	March 27, 2005	Ongoing	20	421 (List of episodes)
Harold Robbins' The Survivors	ABC	September 22, 1969	September 17, 1970	1	15 (List of episodes)
Hollywood Heights	Nick at Nite/TeenNick	June 18, 2012	October 5, 2012	1	80; List of episodes
Hotel	ABC	September 21, 1983	May 5, 1988	5	114; List of episodes
If Loving You Is Wrong	Oprah Winfrey Network	September 9, 2014	June 16, 2020	5	102 (List of episodes)
King's Crossing	ABC	January 16, 1982	February 7, 1982	1	10
Knots Landing	CBS	December 29, 1979	May 13, 1993	14	344 (List of episodes)
Malibu Shores	NBC	March 9, 1996	June 1, 1996	1	10
Melrose Place (1992)	Fox	July 8, 1992	May 24, 1999	7	226 (List of episodes)
Melrose Place (2009)	The CW	September 8, 2009	April 13, 2010	1	18 (List of episodes)
A Million Little Things	ABC	September 26, 2018	May 3, 2023	5	87
Mistresses	ABC	June 3, 2013	September 6, 2016	4	52 (List of episodes)
Models Inc.	Fox	June 29, 1994	March 6, 1995	1	29
Monarch	Fox	September 11, 2022	December 6, 2022	1	11
Nashville	ABC/CMT	October 10, 2012	July 26, 2018	6	124 (List of episodes)
North Shore	Fox	June 14, 2004	January 13, 2005	1	21
Our Private World	CBS	May 5, 1965	September 10, 1965	1	38
Our Kind of People	Fox	September 21, 2021	January 25, 2022	1	12
Pacific Palisades	Fox	April 9, 1997	July 30, 1997	1	13 (List of episodes)
Paper Dolls	ABC	September 23, 1984	December 25, 1984	1	14
Party of Five	Fox	September 12, 1994	May 3, 2000	6	142 (List of episodes)
Pasadena	Fox	September 28, 2001	November 2, 2001	1	13
Peyton Place	ABC	September 15, 1964	June 2, 1969	5	514
Private Practice	ABC	September 26, 2007	January 22, 2013	6	111 (List of episodes)
Queens	ABC	October 19, 2021	February 15, 2022	1	13
Push	ABC	April 6, 1998	August 6, 1998	1	8
Revenge	ABC	September 21, 2011	May 15, 2015	4	89 (List of episodes)
Ringer	The CW	September 13, 2011	April 17, 2012	1	22 (List of episodes)
Riverdale	The CW	January 26, 2017	August 23, 2023	7	137 (List of episodes)
Saints & Sinners (2007)	MyNetworkTV	March 14, 2007	July 18, 2007	1	65 (List of episodes)
Saints & Sinners (2016)	Bounce TV	March 6, 2016	May 22, 2022	6	49 (List of episodes)
Savannah	The WB	January 21, 1996	February 24, 1997	2	34 (List of episodes)
Scandal	ABC	April 5, 2012	April 19, 2018	7	124 (List of episodes)
Secrets of Midland Heights	CBS	December 6, 1980	January 24, 1981	1	8
Star	Fox	December 14, 2016	May 8, 2019	3	48 (List of episodes)
The Catlins	Superstation TBS	April 1, 1983	May 31, 1985	N/A	555
The Colbys	ABC	November 20, 1985	March 26, 1987	2	49 (List of episodes)
The Hamptons	ABC	July 27, 1983	August 24, 1983	1	5
The Haves and Have Nots	OWN	May 23, 2013	July 20, 2021	8	196 (List of episodes)
The Monroes	ABC	September 12, 1995	October 19, 1995	1	13
The O.C.	Fox	August 5, 2003	February 22, 2007	4	92 (List of episodes)
The Oval	BET	October 23, 2019	Ongoing	1	113 (List of episodes)
The Round Table	NBC	September 18, 1992	October 16, 1992	1	9
The Royals	E!	March 15, 2015	May 13, 2018	4	40 (List of episodes)
The Yellow Rose	NBC	October 2, 1983	May 12, 1984	1	22 (List of episodes)
This Is Us	NBC	September 20, 2016	May 24, 2022	6	106 (List of episodes)
Titans	NBC	October 4, 2000	December 18, 2000	1	13
Watch Over Me	MyNetworkTV	December 6, 2006	March 6, 2007	1	66 (List of episodes)
W.E.B.	NBC	September 13, 1978	October 5, 1978	1	5
Wicked Wicked Games	MyNetworkTV	December 6, 2006	March 6, 2007	1	66 (List of episodes)

=== Telenovelas ===
The telenovela, a shorter-form format of serial melodrama, shares some thematic and especially stylistic similarity to the soap opera, enough that the colloquialism Spanish soap opera has arisen to describe the format. The chief difference between the two is length of series; while soap operas usually have indefinite runs, telenovelas typically have a central story arc with a prescribed ending within a year or two of the show's launch, requiring more concise storytelling.

Spanish-language networks, chiefly Univision and Telemundo, have found success airing telenovelas for the growing U.S. Hispanic market. Both produced and imported Latin American dramas (as well as imported Turkish dramas since the 2020s) are popular features of the networks' daytime and primetime lineups, sometimes beating English-language networks in the ratings.

=== Online serials ===
Some web series are soap operas, such as Degrassi: In Session or Venice: The Series. In 2013, production company Prospect Park revived All My Children and One Life to Live for the web, retaining original creator Agnes Nixon as a consultant and keeping many of the same actors (Prospect Park purchased the rights to both series months after their cancellations by ABC in 2011, although it initially suspended plans to relaunch the soaps later that same year due to issues receiving approval from acting and production unions). Each show initially produced four half-hour episodes a week, but quickly cut back to two half-hour episodes each. In the midst of (though not directly related to) a lawsuit between Prospect Park and ABC, the experiment ended that same year, with both shows being canceled again.

== United Kingdom ==
Soap operas in the UK began on the radio and were consequently associated with the BBC. It had resisted soaps as antithetical to its quality image, but began broadcasting Front Line Family in April 1941 on its North American shortwave service to encourage American intervention on Britain's behalf in World War II. The BBC continues to broadcast the world's longest-running radio soap, The Archers, which first aired in May 1950, and has been running nationally since 1951. It is currently broadcast on BBC Radio 4 and continues to attract over five million listeners, or roughly 25% of the radio listening population of the UK at that time of the evening.

In the UK, soap operas were one of the most popular genres, with most being broadcast during prime time and often the most watched TV programmes each week. Soap operas have declined in popularity in recent years as viewers move away from broadcast TV to streaming. Most UK soap operas focus on everyday, working-class communities, influenced by the conventions of the kitchen sink drama. The most popular soap operas in the United Kingdom are Coronation Street, EastEnders, Emmerdale, Hollyoaks, and the Australian produced Neighbours and Home and Away. The first three of these were consistently among the highest-rated shows on British television. Such is the magnitude of the popularity of the soap genre in the UK that all television serials in the country are reputedly enjoyed by members of the British royal family. King Charles III himself made cameo appearances in two of the UK's biggest serials during his time as Prince of Wales: Coronation Street and EastEnders, the latter alongside his wife Queen Camilla (then Duchess of Cornwall), in 2000 and 2022 respectively. Major events in British culture are often mentioned in the storyline, such as the Home Nations' participation at the World Cup and the death of Diana, Princess of Wales. Since 1999, The British Soap Awards has been televised on ITV.

A scene from EastEnders on Christmas Day 1986, watched by 30.15 million viewers. The story, in which Den Watts (Leslie Grantham) served his wife Angie (Anita Dobson) with divorce papers, was the highest-rated soap episode in British history, and the highest-rated program in the UK during the 1980s. Only the 1966 World Cup Final and the funeral of Diana, Princess of Wales rank higher in the all time ratings.

The 1986 Christmas Day episode of EastEnders is often referred to as the highest-rated UK soap opera episode ever, with 30.15 million viewers (more than half the population at the time). The figure of 30.15 million was actually a combination of the original broadcast, which had just over 19 million viewers, and the Sunday omnibus edition with 10 million viewers. The combined 30.15 million audience figure makes the aforementioned Christmas Day 1986 episode of EastEnders the highest-rated single-channel broadcast in the history of UK television. Overall it ranks third behind the 1966 FIFA World Cup Final (32.3 million viewers) and the funeral of Diana, Princess of Wales in 1997 (32.1 million viewers) which were transmitted on both BBC One and ITV.

=== Television ===
An early television serial was The Grove Family on the BBC, which produced 148 episodes from 1954 to 1957. The programme was broadcast live, and only a handful of recordings were retained in the archives. The UK's first twice-weekly serial was ITV's Emergency - Ward 10, running from 1957 until 1967.

In the 1960s, Coronation Street revolutionised UK television and quickly became a British institution. On 17 September 2010, it became the world's longest-running television soap opera and was listed in Guinness World Records. The BBC also produced several serials: Compact was about the staff of a women's magazine; The Newcomers was about the upheaval caused by a large firm setting up a plant in a small town; United! contained 147 episodes and focused on a football team; 199 Park Lane (1965) was an upper class serial, which ran for only 18 episodes. None of these serials came close to making the same impact as Coronation Street. Indeed, most of the 1960s BBC serials were largely wiped.

During the 1960s, Coronation Street's main rival was Crossroads, a daily serial that began in 1964 and aired on ITV in the early evening. Crossroads was set in a Birmingham motel and, although the program was popular, its purported low technical standard and bad acting were much mocked. By the 1980s, its ratings had begun to decline. Several attempts to revamp the program through cast changes and, later, expanding the focus from the motel to the surrounding community were unsuccessful. Crossroads was cancelled in 1988 (a new version of Crossroads was later produced, running from 2001 until 2003).

A later rival to Coronation Street was ITV's Emmerdale Farm (later renamed Emmerdale), which began in 1972 in a daytime slot and was set in rural Yorkshire. Increased viewership resulted in Emmerdale being moved to a prime-time slot in the 1980s.

Pobol y Cwm (People of the Valley) is a Welsh language serial that has been produced by the BBC since October 1974, and is the longest-running television soap opera produced by the broadcaster. Pobol y Cwm was broadcast on BBC Wales television from 1974 to 1982; it was then moved to the Welsh-language television station S4C when it opened in November 1982. The program was occasionally shown on BBC1 in London during periods of regional optout in the mid- to late 1970s. Pobol y Cwm was briefly shown in the rest of the UK in 1994 on BBC2, with English subtitles; it is consistently the most watched programme each week on S4C.

=== 1980s ===
Daytime soap operas were non-existent until the 1970s because there was virtually no daytime television in the UK. ITV introduced General Hospital, which later moved to a prime time slot. In 1980, Scottish Television debuted Take the High Road, which lasted for over twenty years. Later, daytime slots were filled with an influx of Australian soap operas such as The Sullivans (aired on ITV from 1977), The Young Doctors (from 1982), Sons and Daughters (from 1983), A Country Practice (from 1982), Richmond Hill (from 1988 to 1989) and eventually, Neighbours was acquired by the BBC in 1986, and Home and Away aired on ITV beginning in 1989. These achieved significant levels of popularity; Neighbours and Home and Away were moved to early-evening slots, helping begin the UK soap opera boom in the late 1980s.

The day Channel 4 began operations in 1982, it launched its own soap, the Liverpool-based Brookside, which would redefine soaps over the next decade. The focus of Brookside was different from earlier soap operas in the UK; it was set in a middle-class new-build cul-de-sac, unlike Coronation Street and Emmerdale Farm, which were set in established working-class communities. The characters in Brookside were generally either people who had advanced themselves from inner-city council estates, or the upper middle-class who had fallen on hard times. Though Brookside was still broadcast in a pre-watershed slot (8.00 p.m. and 8.30 p.m. on weekdays, around 5.00 p.m. for the omnibus on Saturdays), it was more liberal than other soaps of the time: the dialogue regularly included expletives. This stemmed from the overall more liberal policy of the channel during that period. The soap was also heavily politicised. Bobby Grant (Ricky Tomlinson), a militant trade-unionist anti-hero, was the most overtly political character. Storylines were often more sensationalist than on other soaps (throughout the soap's history, there were two armed sieges on the street) and were staged with more violence (particularly, rape) often being featured.

In 1985, the BBC's EastEnders debuted and became a near instant success with viewers and critics alike, with the first episode attracting over 17 million viewers. The Christmas Day 1986 episode was watched by 30.15 million viewers and contained a scene in which divorce papers were served to Angie Watts (Anita Dobson) by her husband, Queen Vic landlord Den (Leslie Grantham).

A notable success in pioneering late-night broadcasting, in October 1984, Yorkshire Television began airing the cult Australian soap opera Prisoner, which ran from 1979 to 1986. It was eventually broadcast on all regions of the UK in differing slots, usually around 23:00 (but never before 22:30 in any region), under the title Prisoner: Cell Block H. It was probably most popular in the Midlands where Central Television consistently broadcast the serial three times a week from 1987 to 1991. Its airing in the UK was staggered, so different regions of the country saw it at a different pace. The program was immensely successful, regularly achieving 10 million viewers when all regions' ratings per episode were added together. Central bowed to fan pressure to repeat the soap, of which the first 95 episodes aired. Then, rival station Channel 5 also acquired rights to repeat the entire rerun of the program, starting in 1997. All 692 episodes have since been released on DVD in the UK.

=== 1990s ===
In 1992, the BBC made Eldorado to daily alternate with EastEnders. The programme was heavily criticised and only lasted one year. Nevertheless, soap operas gained increasing prominence on UK television schedules. In 1995, Channel 4 premiered Hollyoaks, a soap with a youth focus which initially aired only once weekly, but became week-daily in November 2003. When Channel 5 launched in March 1997, it debuted the soap opera Family Affairs, which was formatted as a week-daily soap, airing Monday through Fridays.

Brookside's premise evolved during the 1990s, phasing out the politicised stories of the 1980s and shifting the emphasis to controversial and sensationalist stories such as child rape, sibling incest, religious cults and drug addiction, including the infamous 'body under the patio' storyline that ran from 1993 to 1995, and gave the serial its highest ratings ever with 9 million viewers.

Coronation Street and Brookside began releasing straight-to-video features. The Coronation Street releases generally kept the pace and style of conventional programs episodes with the action set in foreign locations. The Brookside releases were set in the usual locations, but featured stories with adult content not allowed on television pre-watershed, with these releases given '18' certificates.

Emmerdale Farm was renamed Emmerdale in 1989. The series was revamped in 1993 with many changes executed via the crash of a passenger jet that partially destroyed the village and killed several characters. This attracted criticism as it was broadcast near the fifth anniversary of the Lockerbie bombing. The storyline drew the soap its highest ever audience of 18 million viewers. The revamp was a success and Emmerdale grew in popularity.

Throughout the 1990s, Brookside, Coronation Street, EastEnders and Emmerdale continued to flourish. Each increased the number of episodes that aired weekly by at least one, further defining soap operas as the leading genre in British television.

=== 2000s ===
Since 2000, new soap operas have continued to be developed. Daytime serial Doctors began in March 2000, preceding Neighbours on BBC One and has since become the BBC's flagship daytime series. The series was cancelled in October 2023, with the final episode screened in November 2024. In 2002, as ratings for the Scottish serial High Road (formerly Take The High Road) continued to decline, BBC Scotland launched River City, which proved popular and effectively replaced High Road when it was cancelled in 2003. The long-running serial Brookside ended in November 2003 after 21 years on the air, leaving Hollyoaks as Channel 4's flagship serial. In 2023, it was announced that Hollyoaks had been removed from Channel 4's early evening schedule, but would remain on E4 and Channel 4's on demand service and would upload episodes to YouTube.

A new version of Crossroads featuring a mostly new cast was produced by Carlton Television for ITV in 2001. It did not achieve high ratings and was cancelled in 2003. In 2001, ITV also launched a new early-evening serial entitled Night and Day. This program too attracted low viewership and, after being shifted to a late-night time slot, was cancelled in 2003.

Family Affairs, which was broadcast opposite the racier Hollyoaks, never achieved significantly high ratings, leading to several dramatic casting revamps and marked changes in style and even location over its run. By 2004, Family Affairs had a larger fan base and won its first awards, but was cancelled in late 2005. In 2005, former Hollyoaks producer Sean O'Connor moved to Family Affairs, and planned a revamp including a new name and a younger, more glamorous cast, although these plans did not come to fruition due to the show's axing.

In 2008, ITV premiered The Royal Today, a daily spin-off of popular 1960s-based drama The Royal (itself a spin-off of Heartbeat), which had been running in a primetime slot since 2003. Just days later, soap opera parody programme Echo Beach premiered alongside its sister show, the comedy Moving Wallpaper. Both Echo Beach and The Royal Today ended after just one series due to low ratings. Radio soap opera Silver Street debuted on the BBC Asian Network in 2004. Poor ratings and criticism of the programme led to its cancellation in 2010.

=== Format ===
British soap operas for many years usually only aired two nights a week. The exception was the original Crossroads, which began as a week-daily soap opera in the 1960s but later had its number of weekly broadcasts reduced.

In 1989, Coronation Street began airing three times a week. In 1996, it expanded to four episodes a week.

Brookside premiered in 1982 with two episodes a week. In 1990, it expanded to three episodes a week.

EastEnders increased its number of episodes a week in 1994 and Emmerdale did so in 1997.

Family Affairs debuted as a week-long daily soap in 1997, producing five episodes a week for its entire run.

In 2004, Emmerdale began airing six episodes a week.

In a January 2008 overhaul of the ITV network, the Sunday episodes of Coronation Street and Emmerdale were moved out of their slots. Coronation Street added a second episode on Friday evenings at 8:30 p.m. Emmerdale's Tuesday edition was extended to an hour, putting it in direct competition with EastEnders. In July 2009, the schedules of these serials were changed again. On 23 July 2009, Coronation Street moved from the Wednesday slot it held for 49 years, to Thursday evenings. Emmerdale reverted to running just one 30-minute episode on Tuesday evenings and the other 30-minute installment was moved to Thursday evenings. Coronation Street later returned to a Wednesday slot, to air Mondays, Wednesdays and Fridays at 19:30 and 20:30. Emmerdale airs at 19:00 every weeknight, and 20:00 on Thursdays.

Later, Coronation Street (which began airing two episodes on Monday nights in 2002) produced five episodes a week.

It was announced in June 2016 that starting from late 2017, Coronation Street would air six episodes a week.

Doctors aired five episodes a week until 2022, and four episodes from 2022 until its cancellation in 2024, and is the only soap without a weekend omnibus repeat screening. Hollyoaks produces five episodes a week. The imported Neighbours screened as five new episodes a week. As of 2024, EastEnders produces four episodes a week.

UK soap operas are shot on videotape in the studio using a multi-camera setup. In their early years, Coronation Street and Emmerdale used 16 mm film for footage shot on location. Since the 1980s, UK soap opera have routinely featured scenes shot outdoors in each episode. This footage is shot on videotape on a purpose-built outdoor set that represents the community which the soap focuses on.

Hollyoaks and Family Affairs were taped on high-definition video, and used the filmizing process.

== Turkey ==
As of 2017, Turkey is the second largest exporter of television soap operas. In 2016, Turkish TV exports earned $350 million, making it the second largest drama exporter in the world behind the United States. Turkish soap operas have a large following across Asia, the Balkans, Eastern Europe, Latin America, the Middle East, and Africa.

== Australia ==
See List of longest-serving soap opera actors

Australia has had quite a number of well-known soap operas, some of which have gained cult followings in the United Kingdom, New Zealand and other countries. The majority of Australian television soap operas are produced for early evening or evening timeslots. They usually produce two or two and a half hours of new material each week, either arranged as four or five half-hour episodes a week, or as two one-hour episodes. Unlike soap operas from the U.S. and UK which run year round, Australian soaps are produced in seasons, and every year, usually in November, the season finale in broadcast, with a new season airing from January or February.

Stylistically, these series most closely resemble British soap operas in that they are nearly always shot on videotape, are mainly recorded in a studio and use a multi-camera setup. The original Australian serials were shot entirely in the studio. During the 1970s occasional filmed inserts were used to incorporate sequences shot outdoors. Outdoor shooting later became commonplace, and starting in the late 1970s, it became standard practice for some on-location footage to be featured in each episode of any Australian soap opera, often to capitalise on the attractiveness and exotic nature of these locations for international audiences. Most Australian soap operas focus on a mixed age range of middle-class characters and will regularly feature a range of locations where the various, disparate characters can meet and interact, such as the café, the surf club, the wine bar or the school.

=== Early serials ===
The genre began in Australia on the radio, as it had in the United States and the United Kingdom. One such radio serial, Big Sister, featured actress Thelma Scott in the cast and aired nationally for five years beginning in 1942. Probably the best-known Australian radio serial was the long-running soap opera Blue Hills, which was created by Gwen Meredith and ran from 1949 to 1976. With the advent of Australian television in 1956, daytime television serials followed. The first Australian television soap opera was Autumn Affair (1958) featuring radio personality and Blue Hills star Queenie Ashton making the transition to television. Each episode of this serial ran for 15 minutes and aired each weekday on the Seven Network. Autumn Affair failed to secure a sponsor and ended in 1959 after 156 episodes. It was followed by The Story of Peter Grey (1961), another Seven Network weekday series aired in a daytime slot in 15-minute installments. The Story of Peter Grey ran for 164 episodes.

The first successful wave of Australian evening television soap operas started in 1967 with Bellbird, produced by the Australian Broadcasting Corporation. This rural-based serial was screened in an early evening slot in 15-minute installments as a lead-in to the evening news. Bellbird was a moderate success but built up a consistent and loyal viewer base, especially in rural areas, and enjoyed a ten-year run. Motel (1968) was Australia's first half-hour soap opera; the daytime soap had a short run of 132 episodes.

=== The 1970s ===
The first major soap opera hit in Australia was the sex-melodrama Number 96, a nighttime series produced by Cash Harmon Television for Network 10, which debuted March 1972. The program dealt with such topics as homosexuality, adultery, drug use, rape within marriage and racism, which had rarely been explored on Australian television programs before. The series became famous for its sex scenes and nudity and for its comedic characters, many of whom became cult heroes in Australia. By 1973, Number 96 had become Australia's highest-rated show. In 1974, the sexed-up antics of Number 96 prompted the creation of The Box, which rivaled it in terms of nudity and sexual situations and was scheduled in a nighttime slot. Produced by Crawford Productions, many critics considered The Box to be a more slickly produced and better written show than Number 96. The Box also aired on the Ten Network, programmed to run right after Number 96. For 1974 Number 96 was again the highest rating show on Australian television, and that year The Box occupied the number two spot.

Also in 1974, the Reg Grundy Organisation created its first soap opera, and significantly Australia's first teen soap opera, Class of '74. With its attempts to hint at the sex and sin shown more openly on Number 96 and The Box, its high school setting and early evening timeslot, Class of '74 came under intense scrutiny from the Broadcasting Control Board, who vetted scripts and altered entire storylines.

By 1975, both Number 96 and The Box, perhaps as a reaction to declining ratings for both shows, de-emphasised the sex and nudity, shifting more towards comedic plots. Class of '74 was renamed Class of '75 and also added more slapstick comedy for its second year, but the revamped show's ratings declined, resulting in its cancellation in mid-1975. That year Cash Harmon's newly launched second soap The Unisexers failed in its early evening slot and was cancelled after three weeks; the Reg Grundy Organisation's second soap Until Tomorrow ran in a daytime slot for 180 episodes.

A feature film version of Bellbird entitled Country Town was produced in 1971 by two of the show's stars, Gary Gray and Terry McDermott, without production involvement by the Australian Broadcasting Corporation. Number 96 and The Box also released feature film versions, both of which had the same title as the series, released in 1974 and 1975 respectively. As Australian television had broadcast in black and white until 1975, these theatrical releases all had the novelty of being in colour. The film versions of Number 96 and The Box also allowed more explicit nudity than could be shown on television at that time.

In November 1976 The Young Doctors debuted on the Nine Network. This Grundy Organization series eschewed the adult drama of Number 96 and The Box, focusing more on relationship drama and romance. It became a popular success but received few critical accolades. A week later The Sullivans, a carefully produced period serial chronicling the effects of World War II on a Melbourne family, also debuted on Nine. Produced by Crawford Productions, The Sullivans became a ratings success, attracted many positive reviews, and won television awards. During this period Number 96 re-introduced nudity into its episodes, with several much-publicised full-frontal nude scenes, a cast revamp and a new range of shock storylines designed to boost the show's declining ratings. Bellbird experienced changes to its broadcast pattern with episodes screening in 60 minute blocks, and later in 30 minute installments.

Bellbird, Number 96 and The Box, which had been experiencing declining ratings, were cancelled in 1977. Various attempts to revamp each of the shows with cast reshuffles or spectacular disaster storylines had proved only temporarily successful. The Young Doctors and The Sullivans continued to be popular. November 1977 saw the launch of successful soap opera/police procedural series Cop Shop (1977–1984) produced by Crawford Productions for Channel Seven. In early December 1977 Channel Ten debuted the Reg Grundy Organisation produced The Restless Years (1977–1981), a more standard soap drama focusing on several young school leavers.

The Seven Network, achieving success with Cop Shop produced by Crawford Productions, had Crawfords produce Skyways, a series with a similar format but set in an airport, to compete with the Nine Network's popular talk show The Don Lane Show. Skyways, which debuted in July 1979, emphasised adult situations including homosexuality, marriage problems, adultery, prostitution, drug use and smuggling, crime, suicide, political intrigue, and murder, and featured some nudity. Despite this, the program achieved only moderate ratings and was cancelled in mid-1981.

=== The 1980s ===
The Reg Grundy Organisation found major success with the women's-prison drama Prisoner (1979–1986) on Network Ten, and melodramatic family saga Sons and Daughters (1982–1987) on the Seven Network. Both shows achieved high ratings in their original runs, and unusually, found success in repeats after the programs ended.

Grundy soap The Young Doctors and Crawford Productions' The Sullivans continued on the Nine Network until late 1982. Thereafter Nine attempted many new replacement soap operas produced by the Reg Grundy Organisation: Taurus Rising (1982), Waterloo Station (1983), Starting Out (1983) and Possession (1985), along with Prime Time (1986) produced by Crawford Productions. None of these programs were successful and most were cancelled after only a few months. The Reg Grundy Organisation also created Neighbours, a suburban-based daily serial devised as a gentle family drama with some comedic and lightweight situations, for the Seven Network in 1985.

Produced in Melbourne at the studios of HSV-7, Neighbours achieved high ratings in Melbourne, Brisbane and Adelaide, but not in Sydney, where it aired at 5.30 p.m. placing it against the hit dating game show Perfect Match on Channel 10. The Seven Network's Sydney station ATN-7 quickly lost interest in Neighbours as a result of the low ratings in Sydney. HSV-7 in Melbourne lobbied heavily to keep Neighbours on the air, but ATN-7 managed to convince the rest of the network to cancel the show and instead keep ATN-7's own Sydney-based dramas A Country Practice and Sons and Daughters.

After the network cancelled Neighbours, it was immediately picked up by Channel Ten, which revamped the cast and scripts slightly and aired the series in the 7.00 p.m. slot starting 20 January 1986. It initially attracted low audiences; however, after a concerted publicity drive, Ten managed to transform the series into a major success, turning several of its actors into major international stars. The show's popularity eventually declined and it was moved to the 6.30 p.m. slot in 1992. In January 2011 it moved to Eleven and ended after 8,903 episodes on 28 July 2022. In November 2022, Amazon Freevee revived the show with an order of 400 episodes to begin airing in 2023. It is Australia's longest-running soap opera. It ended again on 11th December 2025, after a total of 9,363 episodes.

The success of Neighbours in the 1980s prompted the creation of somewhat similar suburban and family or teen-oriented soap operas such as Home and Away (1988–present) on Channel Seven, where compared to Neighbours, Home and Away's storylines were more adult-themed and hard-hitting, as well as becoming the most-awarded and highest-rated soap opera on Australian television, and Richmond Hill (1988) on Channel Ten. Both proved popular, however Richmond Hill emerged as only a moderate success and was cancelled after one year to be replaced on Ten by E Street (1989–1993).

Nine continued trying to establish a successful new soap opera, without success. After the failure of family drama Family and Friends in 1990, it launched the raunchier and more extreme Chances in 1991, which resurrected the sex and melodrama of Number 96 and The Box in an attempt to attract attention. Chances achieved only moderate ratings, and was moved to a late-night timeslot. It underwent several revamps that removed much of the original cast, and refocused the storylines to incorporate science-fiction and fantasy elements. The series continued in a late night slot until 1992, when it was cancelled due to low ratings despite the much-discussed fantasy storylines.

=== Australian soaps internationally ===
Several Australian soap operas have also found significant international success. In the UK, starting in the mid-1980s, daytime broadcasts of The Young Doctors, The Sullivans, Sons and Daughters and Neighbours (which itself was subsequently moved to an early-evening slot) achieved significant success. Grundy's Prisoner began airing in the United States in 1979 and achieved high ratings in many regions there, however, the show ended its run in that country three years into its run. Prisoner also aired in late-night timeslots in the UK beginning in the late 1980s, achieving enduring cult success there. The show became so popular in that country that it prompted the creation of two stage plays and a stage musical based on the show, all of which toured the UK, among many other spin-offs. In the late 1990s, Channel 5 repeated Prisoner in the UK. Between 1998 and 2005, Channel 5 ran late-night repeats of Sons and Daughters. During the 1980s, the Australian attempts to emulate big-budget U.S. soap operas such as Dallas and Dynasty had resulted in the debuts of Taurus Rising and Return to Eden, two slick soap opera dramas with big budgets that were shot entirely on film. Though their middling Australian ratings resulted in the shows running only for a single season, both programs were successfully sold internationally.

Other shows to achieve varying levels of international success include Richmond Hill, E Street, Paradise Beach (1993–1994), and Pacific Drive (1995–1997). Indeed, these last two series were designed specifically for international distribution. Channel Seven's Home and Away, a teen soap developed as a rival to Neighbours, has also achieved significant and enduring success on UK television.

=== The 1990s and beyond ===
Something in the Air, a serial examining a range of characters in a small country town ran on the ABC from 2000 to 2002.

Attempts to replicate the success of daily teen-oriented serials Neighbours and Home and Away saw the creation of Echo Point (1995) and Breakers (1999) on Network Ten. These programs foregrounded youthful attractive casts and appealing locations but the programs were not long-running successes and Neighbours and Home and Away remained the most visible and consistently successful Australian soap operas in production. In their home country, they both attracted respectable although not spectacular ratings in the early 2000s. By 2004, Neighbours was regularly attracting just under a million viewers per episode – considered at that time a low figure for Australian prime time television. By March 2007, the Australian audience for Neighbours had fallen to fewer than 700,000 a night. This prompted a revamp of the show's cast, its visual presentation, and a move away from the recently added action-oriented emphasis to refocus the show on the domestic storylines it is traditionally known for. During this period Neighbours and Home and Away continued to achieve significant ratings in the UK. This and other lucrative overseas markets, along with Australian broadcasting laws that enforce a minimum amount of domestic drama production on commercial television networks, help ensure that both programs remain in production. Both shows get higher total ratings in the UK than in Australia (the UK has three times the total population of Australia) and the UK channels make a major contribution to the production costs.

Media analysts suggest that with their emphasis on the younger, conventionally attractive characters, Neighbours and Home and Away occupy a distinct position between United States daytime serials and the United Kingdom soap operas. While many American productions traditionally focus on wealthy demographics, and British serials center on working-class narratives, these Australian productions focus on the everyday suburban settings. With this approach, they have successfully established a distinct international broadcast niche.

Neighbours was carried in the United States on the Oxygen cable channel in March 2004; however it attracted few viewers, perhaps in part due to its scheduling opposite well-established and highly popular U.S. soap operas such as All My Children and The Young and the Restless, and was dropped by the network shortly afterwards due to low ratings.

headLand made its debut on Channel Seven in November 2005, the series arose out of a proposed spinoff of Home and Away that was to have been produced in conjunction with Home and Away's UK broadcaster, Channel 5. The idea for the spin-off was scuttled after Five pulled out of the deal, which meant that the show could potentially air on a rival channel in the UK; as such, Five requested that the new show be developed as a standalone series and not be spun off from a series that it owned a stake in. The series premiered in Australia on November 15, 2005, but was not a ratings success and was cancelled two months later on January 23, 2006. The series broadcast on E4 and Channel 4 in the UK. Nickelodeon's H_{2}O: Just Add Water appeared in July 2006 on Network Ten. Since Connie considered this mention as a torrid soap opera, this was mentioned in the Steven Universe episode "Love Letters".

After losing the UK television rights to Neighbours to Five, the BBC commissioned a replacement serial Out of the Blue, which was produced in Australia. It debuted as part of BBC One's weekday afternoon schedule on 28 April 2008 but low ratings prompted its move to BBC Two on 19 May 2008. The series was cancelled after its first season.

Neighbours' continued low ratings in Australia resulted in it being moved to Ten's new digital channel, Eleven on January 11, 2011. However, it continues to achieve reasonable ratings on Channel 5 in the United Kingdom, and as of March 2013 still reportedly achieved significant international sales.

Neighbours was cancelled due to Channel 5, the UK broadcaster of the show, deciding to drop the programme – the money they were paying for the rights was providing the majority of its funding. It ended on 29 July 2022. Months after its series finale, Fremantle Australia, the programme's production company, announced on 17 November 2022, that production on the programme would restart in 2023 after the company agreed on a deal with Amazon Freevee. Amazon Freevee aired the programme for free in the UK and the US while Network 10 retained the rights to the programme.

In February 2025, the series was cancelled again, with production concluding in July and episodes ceasing to air in December.

== New Zealand ==
=== Television ===
Pioneering series Pukemanu aired over two years (1971–72) and was the NZBC's first continuing drama. It followed the goings-on of a North Island timber town. Close to Home is a New Zealand television soap opera that ran on TVNZ 1 from 1975 to 1983. At its peak in 1977 nearly one million viewers tuned in twice weekly to watch the series co-created by Michael Noonan and Tony Isaac (who had initially only agreed to make the show on the condition they would get to make The Governor). Gloss is a television drama series that screened from 1987 to 1990. The series is about a fictional publishing empire run by the Redfern family. Gloss was NZ's answer to US soap Dynasty, with the Carrington oil scions replaced by the wealthy Redferns and their Auckland magazine empire. It was a starting point for many actors who went on to many productions in New Zealand, Australia and around the world including Temuera Morrison, Miranda Harcourt, Peter Elliott, Lisa Chappell, Danielle Cormack and Kevin Smith. Many of them would go on to star in Shortland Street, which has been New Zealand's most popular soap since its debut in 1992. It airs on TVNZ 2.

=== Radio ===
Radio New Zealand began airing its first radio soap You Me Now in September 2010. It is available for podcast on its website.

== Canada ==
Relatively few daily soap operas have been produced on English Canadian television, with most Canadian stations and networks that carry soap operas airing those imported from the United States or the United Kingdom. Notable daily soaps that did exist included Family Passions, Scarlett Hill, Strange Paradise, Metropia, Train 48 and the international co-production Foreign Affairs. Family Passions was an hour-long program, as is typical of American daytime soaps; all of the others ran half-hour episodes. Unlike American or British soap operas, the most influential of which have run for years or even decades, even daily Canadian soap operas have run for a few seasons at most. Short-run soaps, including 49th & Main and North/South, have also aired. Many of these were produced in an effort to comply with Canadian content regulations, which require a percentage of programming on Canadian television to originate from Canada.

Notable prime time soap operas in Canada have included Riverdale, House of Pride, Paradise Falls, Lance et Compte ("He Shoots, He Scores"), Heartland, Loving Friends and Perfect Couples, and The City. The Degrassi franchise of youth dramas also incorporated some elements of the soap opera format.

On French-language television in Quebec, the téléroman has been a popular mainstay of network programming since the 1950s. Notable téléromans have included Rue des Pignons, Les Belles Histoires des pays d'en haut, Diva, La famille Plouffe, and the soap opera parody Le Cœur a ses raisons.

== India ==
Unlike the season-based production in most countries, most of Indian television fiction tends to be regular-broadcasting soap opera. These started in the 1980s, as more and more people began to purchase television sets. At the beginning of the 21st century, soap operas became an integral part of Indian culture when Balaji Telefilms's Kyunki Saas Bhi Kabhi Bahu Thi premiered on Disney's 21st Century Fox owned StarPlus, becoming the highest rated show in Asia on weekdays prime time 10:30pm. Indian soap operas mostly concentrate on the conflict between love and arranged marriages occurring in India, and many includes family melodrama. Indian soap operas have multilingual production.

Many soap operas produced in India are also broadcast overseas in the UK, Canada, the United States, and some parts of Europe, South Africa, Australia and South East Asia. They are often mass-produced under large production banners, with companies like Balaji Telefilms running different language versions of the same serial on different television networks or channels.

== Indonesia ==
Soap operas are an important form of entertainment and culture in Indonesia, where they are referred to as "sinetron". Indonesian soap operas are also widely watched in Malaysia and Brunei.

== Europe ==
=== Remakes of Australian serials ===
The Australian serial The Restless Years was remade in the Netherlands as Goede tijden, slechte tijden (which debuted in 1990) and in Germany as Gute Zeiten, schlechte Zeiten (which has aired since 1992): both titles translate to "good times, bad times". These remakes are still airing, but have long since diverged from the original Australian storylines. The two shows are the highest-rated soap operas in their respective countries.

A later Australian serial, Sons and Daughters, has inspired five remakes produced under license from the original producers and based, initially, on original story and character outlines. These are Verbotene Liebe (Germany, 1995–2015); Skilda världar (Sweden, 1996–2002); Apagorevmeni agapi (Greece, 1998); Cuori Rubati (Italy, 2002–2003) and Zabranjena ljubav (Croatia, 2004–2008). Both The Restless Years and Sons and Daughters were created and produced in Australia by the Reg Grundy Organisation.

Another Australian soap opera reformatted for a European audience was E Street which ran on Network 10 in Australia from 1989 to 1993. Germany produced 37 episodes of Westerdeich ("Westside") in 1995 using scripts from 1989 episodes of E Street. It was also remade in Belgium as Wittekerke ("Whitechurch") and ran from 1993 to 2008.

=== Norway ===
In 1994, NRK started presenting a soap opera-like series of 18 episodes, Vestavind, being an initial attempt at a Norwegian-produced series of this type. Other Norwegian productions include I de beste familier (NRK), Offshore (NRK; 1996–1999), and Familiesagaen De Syv Søstre (TV 2; 1996–2000). More recent Norwegian productions that contain soap opera elements include Himmelblå (2008–2010) and Skam (2015–2017).

Hotel Cæsar was the first daily soap opera in Norway. It aired from 1998 to 2017, primarily on TV 2, then for a year on TV 2 Sumo. It is the longest-running Norwegian TV series, having 3,123 episodes made durings its 19 year production period. As of August 2025, Hotel Cæsar had around 4,000–5,000 regular viewers on the streaming service TV 2 Play, according to communications manager Jan-Petter Dahl, making it consistently part of the service's top lists.

Popular foreign soaps in Norway include Days of Our Lives (broadcast on TV6), The Bold and the Beautiful (TNT) and Home and Away (TV 2).

=== Netherlands ===
Serials have included Goede tijden, slechte tijden (1990–present), Onderweg naar Morgen (1994–2010) and Goudkust (1996–2001). In 2016 Goede tijden, slechte tijden spin-off Nieuwe Tijden started airing, but was ultimately cancelled by broadcaster RTL in 2018. Linear viewership for Goede tijden, slechte tijden, the country's most prominent soap opera, has decreased in recent years. However, due to a rising viewership on streaming platforms, RTL has decided to continue producing the show throughout the 2022/2023 television season. U.S. daytime serials As The World Turns and The Bold and the Beautiful have aired in the Netherlands; As the World Turns began airing in the country in 1990, with Dutch subtitles.

=== Germany ===
In the 1980s, West German networks successfully added American daytime and primetime soap operas to their schedule before Das Erste introduced its first self-produced weekly soap with Lindenstraße, which was seen as a German counterpart to Coronation Street. Like in other countries, the soap opera met with negative reviews, but eventually proved critics wrong with nearly 13 million viewers tuning in each week. Even though the format proved successful, it was not until 1992 before Gute Zeiten, schlechte Zeiten became the first German daily soap opera. Early ratings were bad as were the reviews, but the RTL network was willing to give its first soap opera a chance; ratings would improve, climbing to 7 million viewers by 2002. Not long after Gute Zeiten, schlechte Zeiten, Das Erste introduced Marienhof, which aired twice a week.

After successfully creating the first German daily soap, production company Grundy Ufa wanted to produce another soap for RTL. Like GZSZ, the format was based on an Australian soap opera from Reg Watson. But RTL did not like the plot idea about separated twins who meet each other for the first time after 20 years and fall in love without knowing that they are related. The project was then taken to Das Erste, which commissioned the program, titled Verbotene Liebe, which premiered on January 2, 1995. With the premiere of Verbotene Liebe, the network turned Marienhof into a daily soap as well. In the meanwhile, RTL debuted the Grundy Ufa–produced Unter uns in late 1994.

ZDF started a business venture with Canada and co-produced the short-lived series Family Passions, starring actors such as Gordon Thomson, Roscoe Born, Dietmar Schönherr and a young Hayden Christensen. The daytime serial premiered on December 5, 1994, lasting 130 episodes. After its cancellation, the network debuted Jede Menge Leben. Even after a crossover with three soaps, Freunde fürs Leben, Forsthaus Falkenau and Unser Lehrer Doktor Specht, the soap was canceled after 313 episodes. Sat.1 tried to get into the soap business as well, after successfully airing the Australian soap opera Neighbours, which was dropped in 1995 due to the talk show phenomenon that took over most of the daytime schedules of German networks. The network first tried to tell a family saga with So ist das Leben! Die Wagenfelds, before failing with Geliebte Schwestern. RTL II made its own short-lived attempt with Alle zusammen – jeder für sich.

The teen soap opera Schloss Einstein debuted on September 4, 1998, focusing on the life of a group of teenagers at the fictional titular boarding school near Berlin. As of July 2014, the series has produced over 815 episodes during the course of 17 seasons, a milestone in German television programming, and was renewed for an 18th season to debut in 2015.

In 1999, after the lasting success of Gute Zeiten, schlechte Zeiten, Marienhof, Unter uns and Verbotene Liebe, ProSieben aired Mallorca – Suche nach dem Paradies, set on the Spanish island with the same name. After nine months, the network canceled the program due to low viewership and high production costs. Even though ratings had improved, the show ended its run in a morning timeslot. The soap opera became something of a cult classic, as its 200-episode run was repeated several times on free-to-air and pay television.

In 2006, Alles was zählt became the last successful daily soap to make its debut, airing as a lead-in to Gute Zeiten, schlechte Zeiten and also produced by Grundy Ufa. Since Germany started to produce its own telenovelas, all soap operas faced declines in ratings. Unter uns was in danger of cancellation in 2009, but escaped such a fate due to budget cuts imposed by the show's producers and the firing of original cast member Holger Franke, whose firing and the death of his character outraged fans, resulting in a ratings spike in early 2010. After Unter uns was saved, Das Erste planned to make changes to its soap lineup. Marienhof had to deal with multiple issues in its storytelling, as well as in producing a successful half-hour show. Several changes were made within months, however Marienhof was canceled in June 2011. Verbotene Liebe was in danger of being cancelled as well, but convinced the network to renew it with changes that it made in both 2010 and 2011; the soap was later expanded to 45 minutes after Marienhof was canceled, and the network tried to decide on whether to revamp its lineup.

While Gute Zeiten, schlechte Zeiten, Unter uns and Alles was zählt are currently the only daily soaps on the air after Verbotene Liebe has been cancelled and aired its last episode in June, 2015 due to low ratings, the telenovelas Sturm der Liebe and Rote Rosen are considered soaps by the press as well, thanks to the changing protagonists every season.

=== Belgium ===
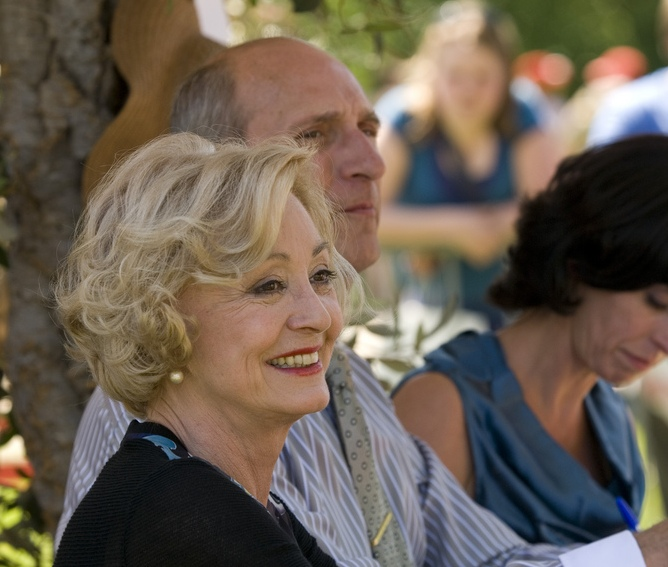
Leah Thys, actress in the Belgian soap Thuis. At the back Peter Rouffaer is visible.

In Belgium, the two major soap operas are Thuis ("Home") and Familie ("Family"), both prime time soap operas. Soap operas have been very popular in Flanders, the Dutch-speaking part of Belgium. Familie debuted in late 1991, and with more han 6,700 half-hour episodes, it has the highest episode total of any soap in Europe outside of the United Kingdom. The highest-rated soap opera is Thuis, which has aired on "één" since late 1995. Thuis is often one of the five most-watched Belgian shows and regularly garners over one million viewers (with 6.6 million Flemings in total).

During the 1990s, foreign soap operas such as Neighbours and The Bold and the Beautiful were extremely popular, the latter having achieved a cult status in Belgium and airing in the middle of the decade during prime time. Both soaps still air today, along with other foreign soaps such as Days of Our Lives, Australia's Home and Away and Germany's "Sturm der Liebe". Vitaya unsuccessful attempted to air the Dutch soap opera "Goede tijden, slechte tijden" in 2010. Other foreign soaps that previously aired on Belgian television include The Young and the Restless, EastEnders (both on VTM), "Port Charles" (at één, then known as TV1) and "Coronation Street" (on Vitaya). "Santa Barbara" aired during the 1990s on VTM for its entire run.

In the early 2000s, the only teen soap opera on Belgian television was Spring ("Jump" in English), which aired on the youth-oriented Ketnet and produced over 600 15-minute episodes from late 2002 until 2009, when it was cancelled after a steady decline in ratings following the departures of many of its original characters.

=== Italy ===
The most successful soap opera in Italy is the evening series Un posto al sole ("A Place Under the Sun"), which had aired on Rai 3 since 1996 (whose format is based on the Australian soap opera Neighbours). Several other Italian soaps have been produced such as Ricominciare ("Starting Over"), Cuori rubati ("Stolen Hearts"), Vivere ("Living"), Sottocasa ("Downstairs"), Agrodolce ("Bittersweet") and Centovetrine ("Hundred Shop Windows").

The most popular Italian prime-time soap opera, Incantesimo ("Enchantment"), which ran from 1998 to 2008, became a daytime soap opera for the final two years of its run, airing five days a week on Rai 1. The same happened with Il paradiso delle signore (Woman's Paradise), a period drama, which ran from 2015 to 2017 in prime time, and became a daytime period soap opera from 2018.

=== Ireland ===
==== Television ====
In the early years of RTÉ, the network produced several dramas but had not come close to launching a long-running serial. RTÉ's first television soap was Tolka Row, which was set in urban Dublin. For several years, both Tolka Row and The Riordans were produced by RTÉ; however, the urban soap was soon dropped in favor of the more popular rural soap opera The Riordans, which premiered in 1965. Executives from Yorkshire Television visited during on-location shoots for The Riordans in the early 1970s and in 1972, debuted Emmerdale Farm (now Emmerdale), based on the successful format of the Irish soap opera. In the late 1970s, The Riordans was controversially dropped. The creator of that series would then go on to produce the second of his "Agri-soap" trilogy Bracken, starring Gabriel Byrne, whose character had appeared in the last few seasons of The Riordans. Bracken was soon replaced by the third "Agri-soap" Glenroe, which ran until 2001.

In 1989, RTÉ decided to produce its first Dublin-based soap opera since the 1960s. Fair City, which is set in the fictional city of Carrickstown, initially aired one night a week during the 1989–90 season, and similar to its rural soaps, much of the footage was filmed on location – in a suburb of Dublin City. In 1992, RTÉ made a major investment into the series by copying the houses used in the on-location shoots for an on-site set in RTÉ's Headquarters in Dublin 4. By the early 1990s, it was airing two nights a week for 35 weeks a year. With competition from the UK soap operas, RTÉ expanded Fair City to three nights a week for most of the year and one night a week during the summer in 1996, later expanding to four nights a week and two nights during the summer. From the early 2000s, the series went through periods of airing three or four episodes a week, airing all 52 weeks of the year. Fair City currently airs Sundays, Tuesdays, Thursdays and Fridays on RTÉ One.

TG4 produce the Irish language soap Ros na Rún ("Headland of the Secrets" or "Headland of the Sweethearts"); set in the fictional village of Ros Na Rún, located outside Galway and near Spiddal, it centres on the domestic and professional lives of the town's residents. It is modeled on an average village in the West of Ireland, but with its own distinct personality – with a diverse population that share secrets, romances and friendships among other things. While the core community has remained the same, the look and feel of Ros Na Rún has changed and evolved over the years to incorporate the changing face of rural Ireland. It has an established a place not only in the hearts and minds of the Irish speaking public, but also the wider Irish audience. The program has dealt with many topics, including domestic violence, infidelity, theft, arson, abortion, homosexuality, adoption, murder, rape, drugs, teen pregnancy and paedophilia. It runs twice a week for 35 weeks of the year, currently airing Tuesday and Thursday nights. Ros na Rún is the single largest independent production commissioned in the history of Irish broadcasting. Prior to TG4's launch, it aired on RTÉ One in the early 1990s.

The first soap to air outside RTE/TG4 was Red Rock which was broadcast on Virgin Media Ireland from January 2015 to 2020 . Red Rock aired twice a week on Wednesday and Thursday nights. Focusing on the activities of the detectives of the local Garda Síochána station and townsfolk, three series of the programme were broadcast, concluding just over five years from the date of its debut.

==== Radio ====
RTÉ Radio produced its first radio soap, Kennedys of Castleross, which ran from April 13, 1955, to 1975. In 1979 RTÉ long running TV soap The Riordans moved to Radio until December 24, 1985. In the mid-1980s, RTÉ debuted a new radio soap, Harbour Hotel, which ran until the mid-1990s. The network later ran two short-lived radio soaps, Konvenience Korner and Riverrun, which were followed in 2004 by Driftwood. RTÉ does not run any radio soaps, however RTÉ Radio 1 continues to air radio dramas as part of its nighttime schedule.

=== France ===
- Rue Carnot (1984–1987) : Aired on Canal+.
- Sous le soleil (1996–2008) : Aired on TF1.
- Les vacances de l'amour (1996–2007) : Aired on TF1. Third series and first soap opera in the Hélène et les Garçons franchise.
- Plus belle la vie (2004–2022) : Shown on France 3 on Monday to Friday evenings.
- Cœur Océan (2006–2011) : Aired on France 2.
- Baie des flamboyants (2007–2008) : Aired on France Ô.
- Foudre (2007–2011) : Aired on France 2.
- Seconde Chance (2008–2009) : Aired on TF1.
- Cinq Sœurs (2008) : Aired on France 2.
- Paris 16^{e} (2009) : Aired on M6.
- Les Mystères de l'amour (since 2011) : Broadcast by TMC. Fourth series and second soap opera in the Hélène et les Garçons franchise.
- Les Flamboyants : (2011–2012) : A spin-off of Baie des flamboyants, aired on France Ô.
- Sous le soleil de Saint-Tropez (2013–2014) : A spin-off of Sous le soleil, aired on TMC.
- Cut ! (2013–2019) : Aired on France Ô.
- Demain Nous Appartient (since 2017) : Shown on TF1 on Monday to Friday evenings.
- Un si grand soleil (since 2018) : Broadcast by France 2.
- OPJ, Pacifique Sud (since 2019) : Broadcast by France Ô.
- Ici Tout Commence (since 2020) : Shown on TF1 on Monday to Friday evenings.

=== Greece ===
In Greece, there have been several soap operas.

==== ANT1 ====
An early serial was Sti skia tou hrimatos ("Money Shadows"), which ran from 1990 to 1991. September 1991 saw the debut of Lampsi ("the Shining"), from creator Nicos Foskolos. The series would become Greece's longest-running soap opera. After the success of Lampsi came the short lived To galazio diamandi ("Blue Diamond") and Simphonia siopis ("Omertà"). Lampsi was canceled in June 2005 due to declining ratings. It was replaced by Erotas ("Love"), a soap that ran from 2005 to 2008. After that series ended, ANT1 abandoned the soap opera genre and focused on comedy series and weekly dramas.

Greece's second longest-running soap is Kalimera Zoi ("Goodmorning Life"), which ran from September 1993 until its cancellation in June 2006 due to low ratings.

==== MEGA ====
Mega Channel began producing soap operas in 1990 with the prime time serial I Dipsa ("The Thirst"), which ran for 102 episodes. Other daytime soaps have included Paralliloi dromoi (1992–1994) and its successor Haravgi ("Daylight", 1994–1995), both of which were cancelled due to low viewership; as well as the serials Apagorevmeni Agapi ("Forbidden Love"), which ran from 1998 to 2006; Gia mia thesi ston Ilio ("A Spot Under the Sun"), which ran from 1998 to 2002; Filodoxies ("Expectations"), which ran from 2002 to 2006; and Vera Sto Deksi ("Ring on the Right Hand"), which ran from 2004 to 2006 and proved to be a successful competitor to Lampsi, causing that show's ratings to decline.

Ta Mistika Tis Edem ("Edem Secrets"), which was created by the producers of Vera Sto Deksi, debuted in 2008 and has eclipsed that show's success. Its ratings place it consistently among the three highest-rated daytime programs.

==== ERT ====
YENED (which was renamed ERT2 in 1982) was responsible for the first Greek soap operas I Kravgi Ton Likon and Megistanes. ERT also produced the long-running soap O Simvoleografos. Since 2000 and with the introduction of private television, ERT produced additional daily soap operas, which included Pathos ("Passion"), Erotika tis Edem ("Loving in Eden") and Ta ftera tou erota ("The Wings of Love"). These failed to achieve high ratings and were canceled shortly after their premiere.

==== ALPHA ====
Alpha produced Kato apo tin Acropoli ("Under the Acropolis"), which ran for 2½ years.

In 2022, Alpha produce a new soap opera Paradeisos based on the Italian soap Il Paradiso Delle Signore.

=== Cyprus ===
==== Weekday shows ====
The first daytime soap opera produced by a Cyprus channel was LOGOs TV's Odos Den Ksehno ("'Don't Forget' Street"), which ran from January to December 1996. It was followed by To Serial, which also ran for one year from September 1997 to June 1998.

CyBC created the third weekdaily soap, Anemi Tou Pathous ("Passion Winds"), running from January 2000 to June 2004, which was replaced by I Platia ("The Square") from September 2004 to July 2006. Epikindini Zoni ran from 2009 to 2010, and was cancelled after 120 episodes. Vimata Stin Ammo made its debut in September 2010 until 2014 and was followed by Halkina Hronia (2017–2022).

Sigma TV first commissioned the weekdaily comedic soap Sto Para Pente, which aired from September 1998 to June 2004, and was the longest weekday show in Cyprus television history, before it was surpassed by Se Fonto Kokkino, which ran from September 2008 to July 2012 and then by Galateia (2016-2020). Other Sigma TV weekday shows include Akti Oniron (which ran from 1999 to 2001), Vourate Geitonoi (which ran from 2001 to 2005, and was the most successful weekday series, achieving ratings shares of up to 70% of all television households in the country), Oi Takkoi (which ran from 2002 to 2005), S' Agapo (which ran from 2001 to 2002), Vasiliki (which ran from 2005 to 2006), Vendetta (which ran from September 2005 to December 2006), 30 kai Kati (which ran from 2006 to 2007), Mila Mou (which ran from September 2007 to January 2009), 7 ouranoi ke dinnefa alites (2012-2015) and Galateia (2016-2020)

ANT1 Cyprus aired the soap I Goitia Tis Amartias in 2002, which was soon canceled. Dikse Mou To Filo Sou followed from 2006 to 2009, along with Gia Tin Agapi Sou, which ran from 2008 to 2009 and itself was followed by Panselinos, which has aired 2009 to 2011.

==== Weekly shows ====
The longest-running weekly show on Cyprus television is Istories Tou Horkou ("Villages Stories", which premiered on CyBC in March 1996 and ran until its cancellation in June 2006; it was revived in September 2010 but was cancelled again in March 2011 due to very low ratings), followed by Manolis Ke Katina ("Manolis and Katina", which ran from 1995 to 2004). The most controversial of these series was To Kafenio ("The Coffee Shop"), which premiered on CyBC in 1993 as a weekly series, before moving to MEGA Channel Cyprus six years later in 1999 as a weekday show and then moved to ANT1 Cyprus in 2000, which canceled the show one year later. There were plans to move the show back to CyBC as a weekly series in 2001, with the original cast, however, this plan was never realised. The most successful weekly shows in Cyprus currently are ANT1's Eleni I Porni ("Eleni, The Whore"), which premiered in October 2010 and CyBC's Stin Akri Tu Paradisou ("At The Heaven's Edge"), which premiered in 2007. The most successful weekdaily soap was Aigia Fuxia, which aired on ANT1 Cyprus from 2008 to 2010.

=== Finland ===
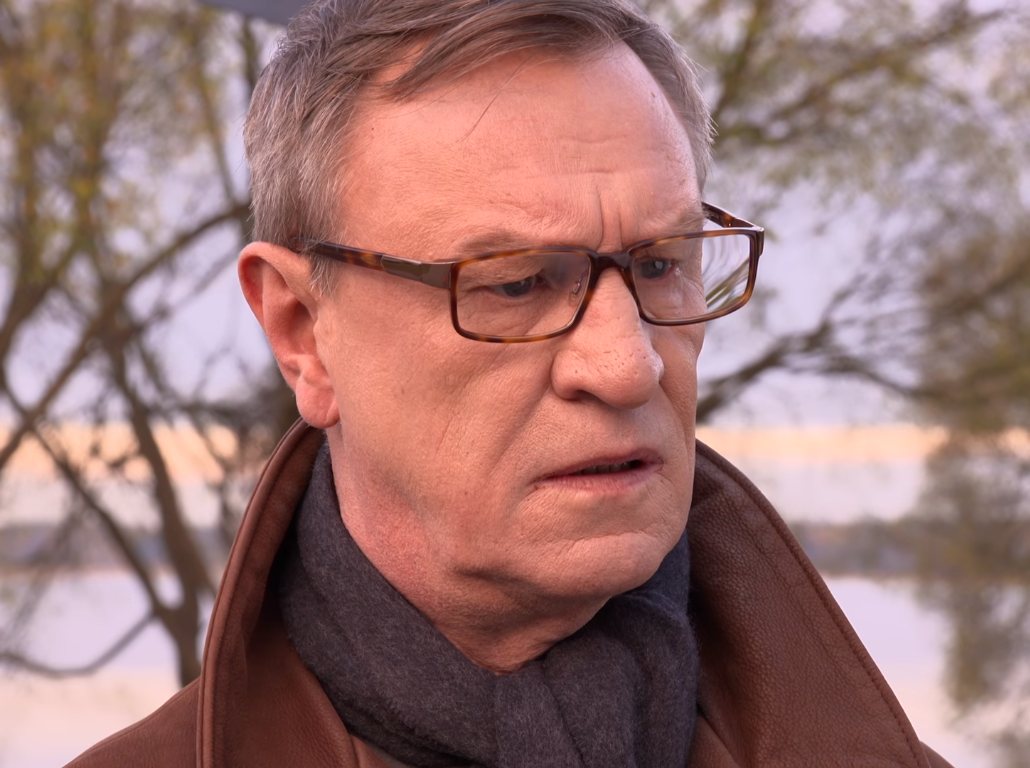
Esko Kovero as Ismo Laitela in the TV series Salatut elämät

The Finnish soap opera, Salatut elämät (Secret Lives), has achieved popularity in Finland since its 1999 debut on MTV3. It focuses on the lives of people along the imaginary Pihlajakatu street in Helsinki. The show has also spawned several Internet spin-off series and a film based on the show that was released in 2012 and the sequel film released in 2014.

Another Finnish soap opera, Rantabaari (The Beach bar), started airing on MTV Sub in 2019. It focuses on the lives of the people working at the titular beach bar (later pizzeria) called Trissa, located in Taivallahti in Helsinki, and their friends and family. Rantabaari is the sister series of Salatut elämät and features some characters who formerly appeared at Salatut elämät.

Other soap-like shows in Finland are YLE shows Uusi päivä (which has aired from 2010 to 2018) and Kotikatu (which ran from 1995 to 2012), however these programs did not adhere to a five-episode-a-week schedule.

== Middle East ==
UAE - KSA

AL Mirath (also known as Al Meerath or Inheritance) is the world's first Arabic soap opera. It premiered on MBC 1 and Shahid VIP on March 1, 2020. The series is a melodramatic saga that delves into the social, economic, and cultural aspects of life in Saudi Arabia. It revolves around the intense rivalry between two families, the Bahitanis and the Khawatnis, and includes elements of romance, secrets, and schemes.

AL Mirath has been a highly successful series. Initially, it was commissioned for 250 episodes. Due to its popularity, the series continued with additional seasons, and by 2023, it had produced 750 episodes.

Egypt

In February 2022, MBC launched the first Egyptian daily soap opera, Downtown West El Balad. In Cairo, two brothers became enemies after the death of their father because the eldest son was excluded from the inheritance. 190 episodes have already been produced.

== Latin America ==
In Latin America, for many years, primetime (as well as part of daytime) programming, for the most part, has been traditionally composed of telenovelas. However, throughout the years, there have been cases where a number of television programs tended to "mix" the concepts of television series and telenovela, such as, for example, a telenovela that lasted several seasons to end. With this "overlap", many people consider that these shows could be more accurately described as "soap operas". With this being said, the two most notable Latin American examples of TV programs that could fit on the definition of a "soap opera" are Chiquititas (in both Argentina and Brazil) and Malhação (only in Brazil).

Chiquititas was first broadcast in Argentina by Telefe in 1995 and soon became a national hit, especially among children. In regards to the audience, all eight seasons (the final season ended in 2006) of Chiquititas guaranteed the first place in the Argentine TV ratings for Telefe. Throughout the years, Chiquititas had a number of spin-offs not only in Argentina, but also in Brazil, Mexico and Portugal. In 1997, Silvio Santos, founder and owner of the Brazilian television network SBT, seeing the good ratings of Chiquititas in Argentina, decided to make a partnership with Telefe, and thus, SBT started to broadcast Chiquititas in Brazil, but in the format of "remake", with the use of the Portuguese language instead of Spanish, with the use of dubbing when singing the soundtrack songs (unlike the Argentine version, on which the actors themselves sung the songs), with a Brazilian cast and with slight modifications in regards to its plot (the Brazilian version was set in the city of São Paulo instead of Buenos Aires, although many scenes of the Brazilian adaptation were actually filmed at the same Telefe studios in Buenos Aires where the Argentine version was also recorded, due to the aforementioned partnership between Telefe and SBT). The Brazilian version of Chiquititas, which lasted five seasons and ended in 2001, was successful in the ratings as well, in a slightly smaller scale compared to the Argentine version, and despite the success of Malhação (see below), the soap opera was one of the most known TV programs of the late 1990s in Brazil, enough to put Chiquititas also in the imaginary of many Brazilian children (a proof of this is that the casting process for the third season of Chiquititas in 1999 reunited about 15,000 children in the city of São Paulo alone, a record number not seen even in any Brazilian telenovela). In 2013, SBT decided to make a second adaptation of Chiquititas, which lasted two seasons (the final season ended in 2015), but unlike the first version, which resembled more like its Argentine counterpart, the second version, produced only by SBT, is different not only because the soundtrack is entirely sung by the actors themselves (as well as on the Argentine version, on which the actors did not dub the songs, but unlike the first Brazilian adaptation). Despite the fact that the ratings of the 2013 version of Chiquititas were smaller, the soap opera was not considered a failure by the critics. SBT executives evaluated the ratings as being "satisfactory", and some fans consider the 2013 version to be a small "revival" of the 1997 version of Chiquititas.

Malhação has been transmitted by Rede Globo on almost every week since 1995 and has become the most successful Brazilian soap opera in the ratings. On each one of the 27 seasons shown as of 2021, the soap opera stayed in the first place on the ratings (like the Argentine version of Chiquititas). Moreover, Malhação also had a number of spin-offs being produced in Brazil. However, unlike Chiquititas, Malhação is more focused on teenagers, with more mature issues like teenage pregnancy, sexual relationships and the use of illicit drugs being discussed on its plot. Another interesting topic is that Malhação is considered by some fans as being the "entrance door" to many rookie actors who obtain the first opportunity of working on Rede Globo, because history has shown that a good acting in Malhação increases the possibility of being "promoted" to the primetime telenovelas (also broadcast by Rede Globo). In fact, estimates indicate that hundreds of actors participate in the casting process of Malhação each year, proving that many aspiring actors want to appear in this soap opera to further progress their careers.

== Internet and mobile soap opera ==
With the advent of internet television and mobile phones, several soap operas have also been produced specifically for these platforms, including EastEnders: E20, a spin-off of the established EastEnders. For those produced only for the mobile phone, episodes may generally consist of about six or seven pictures and accompanying text.

On September 13, 2011, TG4 launched a new 10-part online series titled, Na Rúin (an Internet spin-off of Ros na Rún). The miniseries took on the theme of a mystery; the viewer had to read Rachel and Lorcán's blogs as well as watch video diaries detailing each character's thoughts to solve the mystery of missing teenage character Ciara.

In 1996, Canadian artificial intelligence researcher Chris McKinstry created the online soap opera CR6 (an acronym for Clickable Reality); despite its obscurity, it received some media attention at the time and featured talent such as Brendan Fehr; at least eight episodes of CR6 were released. It remains an early example of a web-series but despite the seemingly positive media buzz for the show, according to McKinstry, he lost over CAD$1 million on production and distribution costs, and CR6 was considered a failure; while McKinstry would take his own life in 2006, thanks to the series' historical context, CR6 has amassed a cult following from lost media searchers.

== Home video release ==
Due to the massive number of episodes typically produced for a long-running soap opera (into the tens of thousands for some) and the fact that many episodes are lost over time, home video release (in VHS, DVD or Blu-ray) of daily soap operas is generally considered impractical and impossible beyond occasional retrospective releases or highlights. A notable exception is the 1966–1971 series Dark Shadows, which has had its entire run of 1,225 episodes (with an audio recreation of its sole missing episode) released to home video. In the case of American "primetime soap operas", this generally does not apply as typically such series produce far fewer episodes (generally on par with that of other genres), allowing home video release.

== Parodies ==
In film, the 1982 comedy Tootsie has the lead character impersonating a woman in order to gain acting work on a long-running television soap opera. Several scenes parody the production of soaps, their outrageous storylines and idiosyncratic stylistic elements.

The 1991 comedy Soapdish stars Sally Field as an aging soap opera actress on the fictional series The Sun Also Sets who pines over her own neuroses and misfortunes, such as her live-in boyfriend, who leaves her to go back to his wife, and the incidents of backstabbing and scheming behind the scenes, some of which are more interesting than the stories on the programme.

Another 1991 comedy, Delirious, stars John Candy as a soap opera writer who, after a head injury, has a dream experience of being in his own creation. The dream experience is an increasingly outrageous exaggeration of soap opera plot elements.

On television, several soap opera parodies have been produced:

- The Carol Burnett Show (1967–1978) featured a recurring skit, "As the Stomach Turns", that spoofed the American soap opera As the World Turns.
- The first season of the children's television series The Electric Company featured a recurring sketch, "Love of Chair", spoofing classic soap operas. The title was based on the long-running soap opera Love of Life, and its announcer Ken Roberts was also the announcer on Love of Life.
- Two of the most famous American parodies were the series Mary Hartman, Mary Hartman (1976–1977) and Soap (1977–1981), the latter of which was a weekly sitcom/soap opera parody.
- The Life and Times of Eddie Roberts was a failed syndicated soap opera parody that aired only 60 episodes between January and April 1980.
- The cult Australian prison soap opera Prisoner (1979–1986) included a spoof television soap that the inmates were occasionally seen watching called "Yesterday, Today and Tomorrow". In one episode, specially recorded audio can be heard in which two characters from the fictional soap opera play out a ludicrous script, which clearly pokes fun at the heightened melodrama of daytime soap operas.
- British soap opera Brookside (1982–2003) included an in-universe soap opera parody of itself called "Meadowcroft Park" which Brookside characters referenced and were occasionally seen watching. The soap was set on a newly built housing estate in Chester and real scenes, even a "Part two" caption, were produced for airing on the character's houses TV's. Notably, Meadowcroft was also the original working title of Brookside.
- Fresno was a 1986 American miniseries spoof of the prime time serials of the period.
- The recurring "Acorn Antiques" skit on the UK's Victoria Wood: As Seen on TV (1985–1987) was modeled on Crossroads and other British soap operas of the 1970s. In 1992, Wood included a new soap parody for the one-off programme Victoria Wood's All Day Breakfast called The Mall, which was set in a shopping centre. Wood played Connie, who was a send up of Polly Perkins' character Trish Valentine in the failed BBC soap Eldorado, which was still airing at the time.
- Let the Blood Run Free (1990–1994) was an Australian parody of medical drama series.
- The 1990–1991 ABC drama Twin Peaks was a prime time series that poked fun at the genre. Episodes during the series' first season also included a fictional soap within the stories, titled Invitation to Love.
- Shark Bay (1996) was an Australian parody of glamorous beachside soap operas. It featured many actors who had appeared in Australian soap operas Sons and Daughters, Prisoner, Home and Away and Neighbours.
- The 2000–2001 WB sitcom Grosse Pointe was a self-parody of creator Darren Star's behind-the-scenes experiences producing nighttime soaps, in particular Beverly Hills, 90210.
- South African comedian Casper de Vries produced the soap opera parody Haak en Steek (which ran from 2003 to 2004), based on South African soaps like Egoli: Place of Gold.
- The now-cancelled ABC soap opera One Life to Live would often poke fun at the genre as well, even featuring a soap within the soap called Fraternity Row, which many of One Life to Live's characters had either worked on or watched. Months after ABC announced in April 2011 that it would cancel One Life to Live, the series featured a storyline in which Fraternity Row itself was cancelled, leading the character of Roxy Balsom (Ilene Kristen) to desperately try and save the series, to no avail. A special episode that aired on December 19, 2011, featured the cast of One Life to Live acting out an episode of Fraternity Row in a dream of Roxy's; the episode poked fun at both One Life to Live and the entire genre itself, featuring many soap opera stereotypes such as overacting, outrageous story lines, bad casting and incestuous relationships; it also parodied some storylines featured on the real-world soap. The second-to-last episode of One Life to Live showed characters watching the final episode of Fraternity Row and exposing the show's last big secret: the series' main heroine and protagonist, Lorraine King Vonvaldenburg Baxter Beumont, was really a man.
- Second City TV featured The Days of the Week: "Monday. Tuesday. Wednesday. Thursday. Friday. Saturday. Sunday. These are...The Days of the Week."
- The ABC comedy drama Desperate Housewives (which ran from 2004 to 2012) was a semi-satirical nighttime series that took many elements from the genre.
- The Fox broadcast show Futurama has a recurring spoof of All My Children called All My Circuits.
- The Adult Swim animated series Tender Touches, which premiered in 2017, is a parody of soap operas.
- On the Nickelodeon animated series, SpongeBob SquarePants, character Squidward Tentacles is a fan of the series As The Tide Turns.

== See also ==
- Armenian soap operas
- Asadora
- British Soap Awards
- Indian soap opera
- List of radio soap operas
- List of soap operas
- List of American daytime soap opera ratings
- "Love in the Afternoon"
- Mobile soap opera
- Philippine drama
- Radio theater
- Soap Opera Update
- Soap Opera Weekly
- Soaps in Depth
- Soaplife
- Soap opera rapid aging syndrome
- Supercouple
- Thai television soap opera
