= List of LGBTQ-related films of 2012 =

This is a list of lesbian, gay, bisexual, transgender or queer-related films released in 2012. It contains theatrically released films that deal with important gay, lesbian, bisexual, transgender or queer characters or issues and may have same-sex romance or relationships as a plot device.

== Films ==
Title	Director	Country	Genre	Cast	Notes
The Adored	Carl Medland and Amarjeet Singh	United Kingdom	Drama, Mystery, Romance	Laura Martin-Simpson, Ione Butler, Caroline Burns Cook, Jake Maskall	Psychological lesbian thriller
Amen	Judhajit Bagchi, Ranadeep Bhattacharyya	India	Drama, Biography	Karan Veer Mehra, Jitin Gulati	Based on activist Harish Iyer's life
Any Day Now	Travis Fine	United States	Drama	Alan Cumming, Garret Dillahunt, Gregg Henry, Jamie Anne Allman, Chris Mulkey, Don Franklin, Kelli Williams, Alan Rachins, Frances Fisher, Isaac Leyva, Mindy Sterling, Miracle Laurie, Michael Nouri, Jeffrey Pierce	
Ardhanaari	Santhosh Souparnika	India	Drama	Manoj K. Jayan, Maniyanpilla Raju, Thilakan, Sukumari	
Ballroom Rules	Nickolas Bird, Eleanor Sharpe	Australia	Documentary	Anny Salerni and Eleanor Sharpe	Same-sex ballroom dancers pursuing dreams of competing at the Gay Games in Germany
BearCity 2: The Proposal	Doug Langway	United States	Comedy	Gerald McCullouch, Stephen Guarino, Brian Keane, Gregory Gunter, James Martinez	
Beyond the Hills	Cristian Mungiu	Romania	Drama	Cosmina Stratan, Cristina Flutur	
Beyond the Walls (Hors les murs)	David Lambert	Belgium; Canada; France	Drama	Guillaume Gouix, Matila Malliarakis, David Salles, Mélissa Désormeaux-Poulin, Flonja Kodheli, Carmela Locantore	
Blue and Not So Pink	Miguel Ferrari	Venezuela	Drama	Guillermo García, Ignacio Montes, Hilda Abrahamz, Carolina Torres, Alexander Da Silva, Sócrates Serrano, Elba Escobar, Beatriz Valdés	Won the Goya Award for Best Spanish Language Foreign Film at the 28th Goya Awards in 2014
Call Me Kuchu	Malika Zouhali-Worrall and Katherine Fairfax Wright	United States	Documentary	David Kato (Founder, Sexual Minorities Uganda), Gilles Muhame (Managing Editor, Rolling Stone), John "Longjones" Abdallah Wambere (Journalist), Naome Ruzindana (Founder, Coalition of African Lesbians), Pastor Solomon Male, David Bahati (Ugandan Politician), Pastor Martin Ssempa and Bishop Christopher Senyonjo	
Cloud Atlas	Lana Wachowski, Lilly Wachowski, Tom Tykwer	United States; Germany	Science fiction, drama	Tom Hanks, Halle Berry, Jim Broadbent, Hugo Weaving, Jim Sturgess, Doona Bae, Ben Whishaw, James D'Arcy, Zhou Xun, Keith David, David Gyasi, Susan Sarandon, Hugh Grant	Based on the novel of the same name by David Mitchell
Common Gender	Noman Robin	Bangladesh	Drama	Dolly Zahur, Chitralekha Guho, Dileep Chakraborty and Saju Khadem	
Do Not Disturb	Yvan Attal	France	Comedy	François Cluzet, Yvan Attal, Laetitia Casta, Charlotte Gainsbourg, Asia Argento, Joeystarr	
Farewell, My Queen (Les adieux à la reine)	Benoît Jacquot	France; Spain	Drama	Léa Seydoux, Diane Kruger, Virginie Ledoyen, Xavier Beauvois, Grégory Gadebois	Based on the novel of the same name by Chantal Thomas
For Dorian	Rodrigo Barriuso	Canada	Short drama	Ron Lea, Dylan Harman	
Fourplay	Kyle Henry	United States	Comedy, drama, romance	Christeene, Gary Chason, Danielle Rene, Atticus Rowe, Sara Sevigny, Paul Soileau, Jose Villarreal	Premiered at Outfest 2010
Gayby	Jonathan Lisecki	United States	Comedy, drama	Jenn Harris, Matthew Wilkas, Mike Doyle, Jonathan Lisecki	Based on the 2010 short film of the same name
Girlfriend, Boyfriend	Ya-che Yang	Taiwan	Comedy, romance	Gwei Lun-mei, Joseph Chang, Rhydian Vaughan, Bryan Chang, Serena Fang	
The Guest House	Michael Baumgarten	United States	Romance	Ruth Reynolds, Madeline Merritt	
How to Survive a Plague	David France	United States	Documentary	Interviews with; Bill Bahlman, David Barr (HIV/AIDS activist) Gregg Bordowitz, Spencer Cox, Jim Eigo, Susan Ellenberg, Anthony S. Fauci, Mark Harrington, Garance Franke-Ruta, Larry Kramer, Mathilde Krim, Ed Koch, Iris Long, Ray Navarro, Ann Northrop, Bob Rafsky, Peter Staley and archive footage of George H. W. Bush, Bill Clinton and Jesse Helms	About the early years of the AIDS epidemic. Nominated for the Academy Award for Best Documentary Feature in the 85th Academy Awards
I Do	Glenn Gaylord	United States	Drama	David W. Ross, Jamie-Lynn Sigler, Alicia Witt, Grant Bowler, Maurice Compte, Mike C. Manning	Festival circuit; general release in 2013
I Want Your Love	Travis Mathews	United States	Drama	Jesse Metzger, Brontez Purnell, Ben Jasper	Feature expansion of a short film made by Mathews in 2010
The Invisibles (Les Invisibles)	Sébastien Lifshitz	France	Documentary	Bernard, Catherine, Christian, Thérèse Clerc, Elisabeth, Monique Isselé, Jacques, Pierre, Pierrot and Yann	
It's Not a Cowboy Movie (Ce n'est pas un film de cowboys)	Benjamin Parent	France	Short, comedy	Malivaï Yakou, Finnegan Oldfield, Leïla Choukri, Garance Marillier, Damien Gomes	Queer Palm winner for short film
Jack and Diane	Bradley Rust Gray	United States	Drama, horror, romance	Juno Temple, Riley Keough, Dane DeHaan, Haviland Morris, Cara Seymour, Kylie Minogue, Lou Taylor Pucci, Neal Huff, Michael Chernus	
Jaurès	Vincent Dieutre	France	Docudrama	Eva Truffaut and Vincent Dieutre	Named after the Parisian métro station Jaurès and won the Teddy Award Jury Prize in 2012
Jobriath A.D.	Kieran Turner	United States	Documentary	Interviews with; agent Jerry Brandt, singer Jayne County, actor Dennis Christopher, singer Joe Elliott, singer Kristian Hoffman, singer Gloria Jones, artist Ann Magnuson, Miss Mercy (singer with The GTOs), singer Jake Shears, singer Will Sheff, singer Marc Almond, artist Joseph Arias, Michael Butler, record label boss Lisa Fancher and Jim Fouratt	Features Jobriath, first openly gay rock musician to be signed to a major record label, treated as the 'next' David Bowie, but was trashed
Joshua Tree, 1951: A Portrait of James Dean	Matthew Mishory	United States	Drama	James Preston, Dan Glenn, Clare Grant, Erin Daniels, Rafael Morais, Edward Singletary, Darri Ingolfsson, Edgar Morais, Dalilah Rain	
K-11	Jules Stewart	United States	Drama	Goran Višnjić, Kate del Castillo, D. B. Sweeney, Portia Doubleday, Jason Mewes, Tom Lister Jr. (credited as Tommy "Tiny" Lister), Sonya Eddy	
Keep the Lights On	Ira Sachs	United States	Drama	Thure Lindhardt, Zachary Booth, Julianne Nicholson, Souléymane Sy Savané, Paprika Steen	
Last Chance (Une derniere chance)	Paul-Émile d'Entremont	Canada	Documentary	Five LGBT people seeking the right of asylum in Canada in order to escape persecution or homophobic violence in their homelands including; a transgender woman who was institutionalized by her family in Lebanon, an LGBT person jailed in Egypt and as Trudi, a corrective raped Jamaican lesbian	
Laurence Anyways	Xavier Dolan	Canada; France	Drama, romance	Melvil Poupaud, Suzanne Clément, Nathalie Baye, Monia Chokri	
Look at Me Again (Olhe pra mim de novo) and Berlinale in 2012	Kiko Goifman, Claudia Priscilla	Brazil	Documentary	(Sillvyo Lucio), born female, searching to find a doctor in Brazil who will perform gender re-assignment surgery. Also interviewed Lucio's mother and daughter	Screened at BAFICI
Love Free or Die: How the Bishop of New Hampshire is Changing the World	Macky Alston	United States	Documentary	About Gene Robinson, who is widely known for being the first priest in an openly gay relationship to be consecrated a bishop in a major Christian denomination believing in the historic episcopate	Shown at Sundance Film Festival
Love Is Not Perfect (L'amore è imperfetto)	Francesca Muci	Italy	Romance	Anna Foglietta, Giulio Berruti	
Mapa Para Conversar (A Map for a Talk) Sometimes translated as 'A Map For Love'	Constanza Fernández	Chile	Drama	Moro Andrea, Francisca Bernardi, Romano Kottow, Francisco Pizarro Saenz de Urtury and Mariana Prat	
Margarita	Laurie Colbert, Dominique Cardona	Canada	Comedy-drama	Nicola Correia-Damude, Patrick McKenna, Christine Horne, Maya Ritter	
The Master	Paul Thomas Anderson	United States	Drama	Joaquin Phoenix, Philip Seymour Hoffman, Amy Adams, Laura Dern, Ambyr Childers, Rami Malek, Jesse Plemons, Kevin J. O'Connor, Christopher Evan Welch, Madisen Beaty, Lena Endre, Amy Ferguson, Patty McCormack, Jillian Bell, Joshua Close, Fiona Dourif, David Warshofsky, Steven Wiig, W. Earl Brown	Homoerotic subtext
Men to Kiss (Männer zum knutschen)	Robert Hasfogel	Germany	Comedy	Frank Christian Marx, Udo Lutz, Alexandra Starnitzky, Sascia Haj, Marcel Schlutt, Marcus Lachmann	Winner of FilmOut Audience Award San Diego, US
Mississippi I Am	Harriet Hirshorn, Katherine Linton	United States	Documentary	Lance Bass, Constance McMillen	
Mixed Kebab	Guy Lee Thys	Belgium; Turkey	Drama	Cem Akkanat, Simon Van Buyten, Gamze Tazim, Karlijn Sileghem, Lukas De Wolf	
Mommy Is Coming	Cheryl Dunye	Germany	Comedy, romance	Lil Harlow, Papi Coxx, Maggie Tapert, Wieland Speck, Cheryl Dunye, Stefan Kuschner, Jiz Lee, Judy Minx	
Mosquita y Mari	Aurora Guerrero	United States	Drama	Fenessa Pineda, Venecia Troncoso	
My Brother the Devil	Sally El Hosaini	United Kingdom	Drama	James Floyd, Fady Elsayed, Saïd Taghmaoui	
The Mystery of Mazo de la Roche	Maya Gallus	Canada	Docudrama	Severn Thompson, Deborah Hay	
On the Road	Walter Salles	France; United Kingdom; Brazil; United States; Canada	Adventure, drama	Garrett Hedlund, Sam Riley, Kristen Stewart	Based on the novel by Jack Kerouac
Out in the Dark (Alata)	Michael Mayer	Israel	Drama	Nicholas Jacob, Michael Aloni, Jamil Khoury, Alon Pdut, Loai Nofi, Khawlah Hag-Debsy, Maysa Daw, Shimon Mimran	
ParaNorman	Sam Fell; Chris Butler	United States	Animation	Kodi Smit-McPhee, Tucker Albrizzi, Anna Kendrick, Casey Affleck, Christopher Mintz-Plasse, Leslie Mann, Jeff Garlin, Elaine Stritch, Bernard Hill, Jodelle Ferland	
A Perfect Ending	Nicole Conn	United States	Drama	Jessica Clark, Barbara Niven, John Heard, Morgan Fairchild	
Revealing Mr. Maugham	Michael House	United Kingdom; United States	Documentary	Interviews with; Marnie Baxter (actress), Suanne Braun, Tianna Nicole Brown, Camilla Chandon (journalist), Richard Davenport-Hines, Alan Furst, Ronald Harwood, Selina Hastings, Pico Iyer, Armistead Maupin, Akio Namekata (journalist), Nicolas Paravicini (family member), Chris Rolls (journalist), Alexander McCall Smith	Life and work of author W. Somerset Maugham
Sassy Pants	Coley Sohn	United States	Comedy	Anna Gunn, Ashley Rickards, Haley Joel Osment, Diedrich Bader, Jenny O'Hara, Martin Spanjers, Shanna Collins	
Scenes from a Gay Marriage	Matt Riddlehoover	United States	Comedy, romance	Matt Riddlehoover, Jared Allman	
She Said Boom: The Story of Fifth Column	Kevin Hegge	Canada	Documentary		Profile of the queer punk band Fifth Column
The Skinny	Patrik-Ian Polk	United States	Comedy, drama, romance	Jussie Smollett, Blake Young-Fountain, Anthony Burrell	
Sleepless Knights	Stefan Butzmühlen, Cristina Diz	Germany	Drama, romance	Raul Godoy, Jaime Pedruelo, David Ruiz Miranda, Pepa Duran Sanchez, Ángel Muñoz Ruiz	It was presented at the 62nd Berlin Festival (Berlinale)
Soongava: Dance of the Orchids	Subarna Thapa	Nepal	Drama	Saugat Malla, Deeya Maskey, Nisha Adhikari	First Nepalese lesbian film
Speechless	Simon Chung	Hong Kong; China	Drama, mystery, romance	Pierre-Matthieu Vital, Qilun Gao, Yung Yung Yu, Jian Jiang, Yu Ting Si Tu, Shu Ling Lang, Shao Qiu Shen, Hua Li	Chinese/Western gay relationship
Struck by Lightning	Brian Dannelly	United States	Comedy, drama	Chris Colfer, Allison Janney, Christina Hendricks, Sarah Hyland, Carter Jenkins, Brad William Henke, Rebel Wilson, Angela Kinsey, Polly Bergen, Dermot Mulroney	
Stud Life	Campbell Ex	United Kingdom	Drama, romance	T'Nia Miller, Kyle Treslove, Robyn Kerr, Simon Savory, Doña Croll, Naechane Romeo, Manfredi Gelmetti, Mizz. Kimberley	Filmed in London
Swan Lake and filmed in 3D	Ross MacGibbon, Matthew Bourne	United States	Drama, musical	Richard Winsor, Dominic North, Nina Goldman, Madelaine Brennan, Steve Kirkham, Joseph Vaughan	A modern interpretation of Tchaikovsky's ballet Swan Lake, with replacing the female corps de ballet with male dancers
Ta av mig (Undress Me)	Victor Lindgren	Sweden	Short, drama	Jana Bringlöv Ekspong, Björn Elgerd	
Tell No One	Ivan Silvestrini	Italy	Comedy	Josafat Vagni, Jose Dammert, Valeria Bilello, Francesco Montanari, Monica Guerritore, Ninni Bruschetta, Victoria Cabello	Screenplay by Roberto Proia, based on his novel of the same name
Tennessee Queer	Earl Goshorn	United States	Comedy, drama	Christian Walker, Billie Worley, Jim Eikner, Jerre Dye, Ann Marie Hall, Lindsey Roberts, Jamie Mann, Drew Smith, Drew Paslay, David Tankersley	filmed almost entirely in Memphis with a local cast and crew
This Is Not a Dream	Gavin Butt, Ben Walters	United Kingdom; United States; Germany	Documentary	Dickie Beau, Nao Bustamante, Dara Birnbaum, Glenn O'Brien, Vaginal Davis, Kalup Linzy, and other UK performance artists Scottee, David Hoyle, Alp Haydar and Holestar	Features contemporary art and performance
Unfit: Ward vs. Ward	Penny Edmiston	United States	Documentary	Jessica Acebo, Michelle Caldwell, Charlene Carres, Beatrice Dohrn, Carla Janes, Kate Kendell, Michael Kenny, Neena Malik, Leonard Pitts Jr., Gretl Plessinger, Ted Stokes, Susan Walch, Cassey Ward, Donna Welch and Douglas White	1995 Florida case, who is more fit to raise a child: a convicted killer or a lesbian?
United in Anger: A History of ACT UP	Jim Hubbard	United States	Documentary	David Barr, Ken Bing, Gregg Bordowitz, Jim Eigo, Avram Finkelstein, Tom Kalin, Patrick Moore, Michael Nesline, Ann Northrop, Michael Petrelis, Michelangelo Signorile, Peter Staley and archive footage of Vito Russo and Larry Kramer (founder of ACT UP)	
Verde verde (Green green)	Enrique Pineda Barnet	Cuba; Spain	Drama	Héctor Noas, Carlos Miguel Caballero, Farah Maria, Rocío García	
The Weight	Jeon Kyu-hwan	South Korea	Drama	Cho Jae-hyun, Park Ji-a	
Woman's Lake (Frauensee)	Zoltan Paul	Germany	Drama	Nele Rosetz, Therese Hämer, Lea Draeger, Constanze Wächter, Enrico Weidner and Thomas Thieme	
Young and Wild (Joven y alocada)	Marialy Rivas	Chile	Drama	Alicia Rodríguez (credited as Alicia Luz Rodríguez), Aline Küppenheim, María Graica Omegna	
Zenne Dancer	Caner Alper, Mehmet Binay	Turkey	Drama	Kerem Can, Giovanni Arvaneh	
