= List of soap operas =

The following is a list of soap operas that have been broadcast in various countries, including previous and current soap operas. Soap operas that are currently being broadcast are listed in bold if they are not in a table.

== Albania ==
Albanian Soap Operas
Name	Years broadcast
Njerëz dhe Fate (sq)	2002–2003
Dhimbja e dashurisë (sq)	2008
Tingulli i heshtjes (sq)	2010

== Australia ==
Australian Soap Operas
Name	Years broadcast	Ongoing
Blue Hills (radio serial)	1949–1976	X mark
Autumn Affair	1958–1959	X mark
The Story of Peter Grey	1961–1962	X mark
Homicide	1964–1977	X mark
Bellbird	1967–1977	X mark
Motel	1968–1969	X mark
Division 4	1969–1976	X mark
Matlock Police	1971–1975	X mark
Number 96	1972–1977	X mark
Class of '74 / Class of '75	1974–1975	X mark
Rush	1974–1976	X mark
The Box	1974–1977	X mark
Until Tomorrow	1975–1976	X mark
Solo One	1976	X mark
The Young Doctors	1976–1982	X mark
The Sullivans	1976–1983	X mark
Glenview High	1977–1978	X mark
The Restless Years	1977–1981	X mark
Cop Shop	1977–1984	X mark
Skyways	1979–1981	X mark
Prisoner	1979–1986	X mark
Arcade	1980	X mark
Sons and Daughters	1981–1987	X mark
A Country Practice	1981–1994	X mark
Taurus Rising	1982	X mark
Starting Out	1983	X mark
Waterloo Station	1983–1984	X mark
Carson's Law	1983–1984	X mark
Return to Eden	1983–1986	X mark
The Flying Doctors / R.F.D.S.	1985–1994	X mark
Neighbours	1985–2025	X mark
Richmond Hill	1988	X mark
Home and Away	1988–present	check
The Power, The Passion	1989–1990	X mark
E Street	1989–1993	X mark
G. P.	1989–1996	X mark
Family And Friends	1990	X mark
Chances	1991–1992	X mark
Paradise Beach	1993–1994	X mark
Heartbreak High	1994–1999	X mark
Blue Heelers	1994–2006	X mark
Echo Point	1995	X mark
Pacific Drive	1996–2001	X mark
Water Rats	1996–2001	X mark
Wildside	1997–1999	X mark
Murder Call	1997–2000	X mark
Breakers	1998–1999	X mark
Stingers	1998–2004	X mark
All Saints	1998–2009	X mark
Above The Law	2000–2001	X mark
Something in the Air	2000–2002	X mark
The Secret Life of Us	2001–2005	X mark
McLeod's Daughters	2001–2009	X mark
Crash Palace	2001–2002	X mark
CrashBurn	2003	X mark
Love My Way	2004–2007	X mark
headLand	2005–2006	X mark
Blue Water High	2005–2008	X mark
Out of the Blue	2008–2009	X mark
Rush	2008–2011	X mark
Wentworth	2013–2021	X mark
Neighbours: Erinsborough High	2019	X mark
The Heights	2019–2020	X mark

== Austria ==
Name	Year Started	Year Ended	Ongoing?
Kaisermühlen Blues	1992	1999	X mark
Mitten im 8en	2007	2007	X mark
Wien – Tag und Nacht	2014	2014	X mark
Vorstadtweiber	2015	2022	? **Maybe**
Trakehnerblut	2017	Present	check
Walking on Sunshine	2019	Present	check

== Belgium ==
Name	Start date	End date	Ongoing?	Telenovela?
Emma	1 January 2007	27 June 2007	X mark	check
Familie	30 December 1991	present	check	X mark
Thuis	23 December 1995	present	check	X mark
Vennebos	20 January 1997	23 February 1998	X mark	X mark
Wittekerke	31 August 1993	26 August 2008	X mark	X mark
Sara	2007	2008	X mark	check
Lisa	2021	2023	X mark	check
LouisLouise	2008	2009	X mark	check
David	2009	2010	X mark	check
Ella	2010	2011	X mark	check
ZOOP^{a}	7 April 2004	June 2006	X mark	X mark
Het Huis Anubis^{b}	26 September 2006	4 December 2009	X mark	X mark
Het Huis Anubis en de Vijf van het Magische Zwaard^{b}	2010	2011	X mark	X mark
Milo	2024	2024	Maybe	check

a.Made & aired in the Netherlands for The Netherlands & Flanders

b.Made in Belgium for airings in the Netherlands & Flanders

== Bolivia ==
Spanish name	English name
Amor en tiempo seco	The love in time of drought
Cambas en apuros	Cambas in difficulties
Carmelo Hurtado - El Retorno	Carmelo Hurtado Returns
Chantaje de Amor	Blackmail of love
Coraje Salvaje	Wild courage
La Fundación	The Foundation
Hotelucho	Poor Hotel
Indira	
Luna de Locos	Moon of the crazies
Los Pioneros	The Pioneers
Tardes Antiguas	Old Afternoon
Tierra Adentro	Inland
Las Tres Perfectas Solteras	The Three Perfect Unmarried Women
La Última Expedición	The Last Expedition
Una Vida, Un Destino	A life, a destiny
La Virgen de las Siete Calles	The Virgin of the Seven Streets

== Bosnia and Herzegovina ==
- Pečat (2008–2009)

Republika Srpska

- Hotel Balkan (2021)

== Bulgaria ==
Name	Broadcast Period	Ongoing
Hotel Balgariya	2004	X mark
Zabranena Lyubov	October 2008 – 5 May 2011	X mark
Staklen Dom	2010–11 June 2012	X mark
Pod Prikritie	(2011–June 2016)	X mark
Stolichani v poveche	2011-2019	? **Maybe**
Otkradnat jivot	2016-2021	? **Maybe**

== Cambodia ==
- **Roschea Chiveth (The Taste of Life)** (2004-)

== Canada ==
- 11 Cameras (2006)
- 49th & Main (2006)
- The Best Years (2007–2009)
- Black Harbour (1996–1999)
- The City (1999–2000)
- Country Joy (1979)
- Degrassi (1980–1992, 2001–2017)
- Edgemont (2001–2005)
- E.N.G. (1988–1994)
- Falcon Beach (2006–2007)
- Family Passions (1993–1994)
- High Hopes (1978)
- Hillside (also known as Fifteen) (1991–1993)
- Loving Friends and Perfect Couples (1983)
- Metropia (2004–2006)
- Moccasin Flats (2003–2008)
- Moment of Truth (1965)
- Mount Royal (1988)
- MVP (2008)
- North of 60 (1992–1997)
- North/South (2006)
- Paradise Falls (2001–2008)
- Riverdale (1997–2000)
- Train 48 (2003–2005)
- Scarlett Hill (1962–1964)
- Strange Paradise (1969–1970)
- Street Legal (1987–1994)
- Time of Your Life (1988–1989)
- Whistler (2006–2007)
- Wild Roses (2008)

=== Quebec ===
- Virginie (1996–2010)
- Marilyn (1991–1993)
- La Bonne aventure (1982–1986)
- La Maison Deschênes (1987–1989)
- L'or du temps (1985–1993)
- Watatatow (1991–2005)
- 4 et demi...
- Les Belles Histoires des pays d'en haut (1956–1970)
- Le Cœur a ses raisons (2005–2007)
- Les Dames de coeur
- Diva (2010)
- Francoeur
- Jasmine
- Lance et Compte
- La famille Plouffe
- 14, rue de Galais
- Les Soeurs Elliot
- Chambres en ville
- Grand Papa
- Les Hauts et les bas de Sophie Paquin
- Au nom de la loi
- Plus belle la vie
- Providence
- Les Soeurs Elliot
- Terra humaine
- Virginie

== China ==
Name	Broadcast Period
Xieng Fujie	2000–2002
Spirit of Love	2005–2007
Dwelling Narrowness	2009
Golden Marriage	2010
loveo20	

== Croatia ==
Name	Broadcast Period	Episode count
Zabranjena ljubav	2004–2008	805
Najbolje godine	2009–2011	318
Ruža vjetrova	2011–2013	345
Kumovi	2022–present	600+

== Cyprus ==
Name	Name (English)	Original Air dates	Episode count	Ongoing?
Galatia		2016-2020	738	No
Halkina Hronia		2017-2022	795	Maybe
Anemoi Tou Pathous	"Winds of Passion"	2000–2004		No
I Platia	"The Plaza"	2004–2006		No
Mila Mou	"Talk to Me"	2007–2009		No
Se Fonto Kokkino	"On a Red Background"	2008–2012	735	No
7 Ouranoi Ke Sinnefa Alites	"7 skies and Bum clouds"	2012-2015	580	No
Istories Tou Horkou	"Village Stories"	weekly, 1996–2006	510	No
Manolis Ke Katina	"Manolis and Katina"	weekly, 1994–2007		No
Gia Tin Agapi Sou	"For Your Love"	2008–2009		No
Odos Den Xehno	"Don't Forget Street"	1996		No

== Czech Republic ==
- Rodinná pouta (2004–2006)
- Pojišťovna štěstí (2004–2010)
- **Ulice** (2005–present)
- **Ordinace v Růžové zahradě** (2005–present)
- Letiště (2006–2007)
- Velmi křehké vztahy (2007–2009)
- Ošklivka Katka (2008–2009)
- Cesty domů (2010–2015)
- Obchoďák (2012)
- Přístav (2015–2017)
- Ohnivý kuře (2016–2018)
- Modrý kód (2017–2020)
- Krejzovi (2018–2019)
- Slunecná (2020–2022)

== Denmark ==
- Landsbyen (1991–1996)
- Hvide Løgne (1998–2000)
- 2900 Happiness (2007–2009)

== Egypt ==
- Layali El Helmiya (1992)

== Estonia ==
- Kodu keset linna (2003–2011)
- **Õnne 13** (1993–present)
- Helena (2006)
- Elu keset linna (2012–2013)

== Finland ==
- **Salatut elämät** (1999–present)
- Kotikatu (1995–2012)
- Voitto kotiin (1998)
- Tähtitehdas (1998–1999)
- Ihmeidentekijät/Parhaat vuodet (1996–2002)
- Uusi päivä (2010–2018)
- **Rantabaari** (2019–present)

== Falkland Islands ==
- **Sea Light** (2012–present)

== France ==
- Riviera (1991–1992)
- Sous le soleil (1996–2008)
- Tide of Life (1998–2000)
- Plus Belle La Vie (2004–2022)
- Cinq Soeurs (2008)
- **Les Mystères de l'amour** (2011–present)
- Cut ! (2013–2019)
- **Demain nous appartient** (2017–present)
- **Un Si Grand Soleil** (2018–present)
- **Ici tout commence** (2020–present)

== Germany ==
- Lindenstraße (8 December 1985−29 March 2020)
- **Gute Zeiten, schlechte Zeiten** (11 May 1992−present, based on The Restless Years)
- Marienhof (1 October 1992− 15 June 2011)
- **Die Fallers – Eine Schwarzwaldfamilie** (1994−present)
- **Unter uns** (1994−present)
- Verbotene Liebe (1995−2015, based on Sons and Daughters)
- Montagskinder (1995−1996)
- Montagsgeschichten (1997)
- Jede Menge Leben (1995−1996)
- So ist das Leben! Die Wagenfelds (1995−1996)
- Alle zusammen – jeder für sich (1996−1997)
- Von Mann zu Mann (1998)
- St. Angela (1997−2005)
- Geliebte Schwestern (1997−1998)
- Die Anrheiner (1998−2011)
- **Schloss Einstein** (1998−present)
- **In aller Freundschaft** (1998−present)
- Mallorca – Suche nach dem Paradies (1999−2000)
- Berlin Bohème (2000−2005, 53 episodes)
- Bianca – Wege zum Glück (2004−2005)
- Verliebt in Berlin (2005−2007, telenovela; series 1 based on Yo soy Betty, la fea)
- **Sturm der Liebe** (2005−present, telenovela)
- Wege zum Glück (2005−2009)
- Sophie – Braut wider Willen (2005–2006, telenovela)
- Schmetterlinge im Bauch (2006−2007)
- Das Geheimnis meines Vaters (2006 + "Best of", telenovela)
- **Alles was zählt** (2006−present)
- **Rote Rosen** (2006−present, telenovela)
- Maple Avenue (2007, 60 episodes)
- **Dahoam is Dahoam** (2007−present)
- 112 – Sie retten dein Leben (2008−2009)
- Sonntagsmänner (2008)
- Anna und die Liebe (2008−2012, telenovela)
- Alisa – Folge deinem Herzen (2009−2010, telenovela)
- Das Haus Anubis (2009–2012, remake of Het Huis Anubis)
- Lena - Liebe meines Lebens (2010–2011, telenovela; adaption of Don Juan y su bella dama)
- Hand aufs Herz (2010−2011)
- **Verbotene Liebe: Next Generation** (2020–Present)

== Greece ==
- İ Lampsi ["The Shine"] (1991–2005)
- Kalimera Zoe ["Good Morning Life"] (1993–2006)
- Apagoreymeni Agapi ["Forbidden Love"] (1998–2006)
- Filodoxies ["Ambition"] (2002–2006) (799 episodes)
- Vera Sto Dexi ["Wedding Ring on the Right (Hand)"] (2004–2007)
- Erotas ["Love"] (2005–2008)
- Haravgi ["Dawn"]
- Dromoi Paraliloi ["Parallel Roads"]
- Sti skia tou hrimatos ["In Money's Shadow"] (1990–1991)
- To galazio diamanti ["The Blue Diamond"] (1991–1992)
- simphonia ["Agreement" or "Symphony"] (1991–1992)
- İ Dipsa ["The Thirst"] (1990–1991)
- Gia mia thesi ston ilio ["For a Place in the Sun"] (1998–2002)
- Ta mistika tis Edem ["The Secrets of Eden"] (2008–2011)

== Hungary ==
- Barátok közt /Among Friends/ (1998–2021)
- Jóban Rosszban /In Good And in Bad Times/ (2005–2022)
- Szomszédok /Neighbours/ (1987–1999)
- Szeress most! / Love Me Now/ (2003–2005)
- 7 es Csatorna (1999)
- Bűnök és szerelmek /Sins and loves/ (7 January 2013 – 29 November 2013)

== Indonesia ==
=== MD Entertainment ===
- Bawang Merah Bawang Putih (2004)
- Cinta Fitri (2007–2011)
- Cinta Bunga (2007–2008)
- Cinta Kirana (2008)
- Suci (2007–2008)
- Tasbih Cinta (2008)
- Melati untuk Marvel (2008–2009)
- Kesetiaan Cinta (2009–2010)
- Gadis (2012)
- Bersama Meraih Mimpi (2013)
- Teddy Boy (2014)
- Cinta Yang Beda (2014)
- Tendangan Si Madun (2014)
- Tendangan Si Madun Returns (2014)
- Disini Ada Tuyul (2014)
- Si Dul (2014)
- Manusia Harimau (2014)
- Cakep-cakep Sakti (2014)
- Alfa (2014)
- Badai (2014)
- Vampire (2014)
- Rahasia Aura (2015)
- Entong Santri Cilik (2015)
- Bromo (2015)
- Malu-Malu Kucing (2015)
- Nathan dan Nadia (2017)
- Antara Cinta dan Doa (2017)
- Samuel (2025)
- Cinta Cinderella (2025)
- **Terlanjur Indah** (2025)
- **Kupu Malam** (2025)
- Dosa & Cinta (2025)
- Rasa Rindu (2025)

=== Multivision Plus ===
- Gara-Gara (RCTI, 1992–1997) Starring: Lydia Kandouw, Jimmy Gideon, Sion Gideon, Nani Widjaja, Pietrajaya Burnama
- Ada Apa Saja (RCTI, 1991–1992) Starring: Nurul Arifin, Rudi Salam, Kiki Fatmala, Fuad Alkhar
- Angin Tak Dapat Membaca (RCTI, 1996)
- Mawar Mekar Diantara Duri (Indosiar, 1995–1996)
- Selangkah Demi Selangkah (Indosiar, 1995–1996)
- Simphony Dua Hati (RCTI, 1993–1996)
- Pelangi di Hatiku (RCTI, 1991–1992)
- Hati Seluas Samudra (RCTI, 1993–1994)
- Untukmu Segalanya 1–2 (RCTI, 1994–1996)
- Saling Silang (SCTV,1993-1995) Starring: Debby Sahertian, Ida Kusuma, Eeng Saptadi, Zainal Abidin
- Simphony Dua Hati (RCTI, 1995)
- Saat Memberi Saat Menerima (RCTI, 1995)
- Bella Vista 1–3 (RCTI, 1995–1997)
- Anakku Terlahir Kembali (RCTI, 1996–1998)
- Rosanna (SCTV, 1996–1997)
- Jinny oh Jinny 1–5 (RCTI, 1998–2002) Starring: Diana Pungky, Indra Bruggman, Gracia Indri, etc.
- Janjiku (RCTI, 1996–1997)
- Tuyul & Mbak Yul (RCTI, 1997–2002) Starring: Jamal Bulat, Onny Syahrial, Slamet Joyo, Ersa Mayori, Dominiq Sanda, etc.
- Jin & Jun (RCTI, 1996–2001) Starring: Fuad Baradja, Syahrul Gunawan, Mira Asmara, Misye Arsita, Sukma Ayu, M.Amin
- Abad 21 (Indosiar, 1997–1998)
- Asmara (Indosiar, 1997–1998)
- Kupu Kupu Kertas (Indosiar, 1997–1998)
- Selendang Sutera Biru (Indosiar, 1997–1998)
- Istri Pilihan (RCTI, 1997–1998)
- Tersayang (SCTV, 1998–2000)
- Pertalian (SCTV, 1997–1998)
- Bulan Bukan Perawan (RCTI, 1997–1998)
- Air Mata Ibu (RCTI, 1997–1998)
- Hari Berganti Hari (RCTI, 1999)
- Bukan Perempuan Biasa (RCTI, 1996–1998)
- Terpesona (SCTV, 1998–1999)
- Kemuning (RCTI, 1999–2000)
- Hanya Kamu (Indosiar, 1999–2000)
- Melati (SCTV, 1998–1999)
- Tersanjung 1-6 (Indosiar, 1998–2006) Starring: Lulu Tobing, Putri Patricia, Ari Wibowo, Raynold Surbakti, etc.
- Doaku Harapanku 1 (RCTI, 1998–1999) Starring: Krisdayanti, Leily Sagita, Dicky Wahyudi, etc.
- Diantara Dua Pilihan (Indosiar, 1999)
- Doaku Harapanku 2 (RCTI, 1999–2000)
- Dewi Fortuna (SCTV, 1999–2001) Starring: Krisdayanti, Bella Saphira, Didi Riyadi, etc.
- Pena Asmara (Indosiar, 2000)
- Panji Manusia Millenium (RCTI, 1999–2001) Starring: Primus Yustisio, Tia Ivanka, Pangky Suwito, Fendy Pradana, Kiki Widyasari, Anwar Fuady, Diding Boneng, Edy Oglek, etc.
- Terpikat (SCTV, 2000–2001)
- Hati Yang Terpilih (RCTI, 2000)
- Andini (Demi Cinta) (Indosiar, 2001)
- Waktu Terus Berjalan (Indosiar, 2001)
- Bidadari 1–3 (RCTI, 2000–2005) Starring: Marini Zumarnis, Moudy Wilhelmina, Ayu Azhari, Marshanda, Cecep Reza, Vicky Burky, Sheila Dara Aisha, etc.
- Doa Membawa Berkah 1 (Indosiar, 2000)
- Kehormatan 1–3 (Indosiar, 2001–2004)
- Wah Cantiknya 1–2 (SCTV, 2001–2002)
- Indra Keenam (RCTI, 2001–2002)
- Tiga Orang Perempuan (SCTV, 2001)
- Mencintaimu (SCTV, 2001)
- Kalau Cinta Jangan Marah (SCTV, 2001)
- Doa Membawa Berkah 2 (Indosiar, 2001)
- Jinny Lagi Jinny Lagi 1–2 (SCTV, 2002–2004)
- Tuyul Millenium 1–2 (SCTV, 2002–2004)
- Permaisuri Hatiku (RCTI, 2002)
- Tunjuk Satu Bintang (SCTV, 2002)
- Setetes Embun (RCTI, 2002–2003)
- Doa dan Anugerah 1 (Indosiar, 2002)
- Julia Jadi Anak Gedongan (RCTI, 2003–2004)
- Kalau Cinta Sudah Bicara 1 (SCTV, 2003)
- Norak Tapi Beken (RCTI, 2003–2004)
- Kalau Cinta Sudah Bicara 2 (SCTV, 2003–2004)
- Doa dan Anugerah 2 (Indosiar, 2003)
- Si Cecep (SCTV, 2004–2005)
- Seandainya (Indosiar, 2004–2005)
- Bule Masuk Kampung 1 (Indosiar, 2004)
- Titipan Ilahi (Indosiar, 2004–2006)
- Adilkah (Indosiar, 2004–2005)
- Jangan Behenti Mencintaiku (SCTV, 2004–2006)
- Untung Ada Jinny (SCTV, 2004–2005)
- Bule Masuk Kampung 2 (Indosiar, 2004–2005)
- Bule Masuk Kampung 3 (Indosiar, 2005)
- Dina Dini dalam dekapan Doni (Indosiar, 2006)
- Cinta Indah 1–2 (SCTV, 2007–2008)
- Suami-Suami Takut Istri (Trans TV, 2007)
- Abdel & Temon Bukan Superstar (Global TV, 2008–2009)
- Bukan Abdel & Temon Biasa (Global TV, 2009)
- Nurhaliza (Indosiar, 2010)
- Beningnya Cinta (Indosiar, 2010)
- Islam KTP (SCTV, 2010–2011)
- Istiqomah (SCTV, 2011)
- Khadijah dan Khalifah (Indosiar, 2011)
- Hijrah Cinta The Series (2014)
- Cahaya Cinta (ANTV, 2017)
- I-KTP (ANTV, 2017)
- Nadin (ANTV, 2017)
- Cinta di Pangkuan Himalaya (ANTV, 2017)
- Kecil-Kecil Mikir Jadi Manten (ANTV, 2017)
- Kekasih Dunia Akhirat (ANTV, 2017)
- Ada Si Manis di Jembatan (ANTV, 2017)
- Wanita Perindu Surga (ANTV, 2017–2018)
- Nabil & Nabila (ANTV, 2017)
- Ummi (ANTV, 2018)
- Oh Mama Oh Papa (ANTV, 2018)
- Karma The Series (ANTV, 2018)
- Roy Kiyoshi Anak Indigo (ANTV, 2018)
- Semua Indah Karena Cinta (RCTI, 2018)
- Tangis Kehidupan Wanita (ANTV, 2018)
- Cinta Tiada Akhir (ANTV, 2018)
- Cinta Sebening Embun (RCTI, 2019)
- Pelangi di Matamu (RCTI, 2019)
- Aisyah (ANTV, 2019)
- Ratapan Ibu Tiri (ANTV, 2020)
- Kasih Sepanjang Masa (RCTI, 2020)
- Cinta yang Abadi (ANTV, 2020)
- Jalan Batin Ningsih Tinampi (ANTV, 2020–present)

=== SinemArt ===
- Ada Apa Dengan Cinta? (RCTI, 2003–2005)
- Kisah Sedih di Hari Minggu (RCTI, 2004–2005)
- Liontin (RCTI, 2005–2006)
- Pintu Hidayah (RCTI, 2005–2007)
- Maha Kasih (RCTI, 2006)
- Wulan (RCTI, 2006–2007)
- Intan (RCTI, 2006–2007)
- Ketika Cinta Bertasbih (Ramadhan Special) (RCTI, 2010)
- Putri Yang Ditukar (RCTI, 2010–2011)
- Kemilau Cinta Kamila (RCTI, 2010–2011)
- Ketika Cinta Bertasbih (Meraih Ridho Ilahi) (RCTI, 2011)
- Tukang Bubur Naik Haji: The Series (RCTI, 2012–2017)
- Tendangan dari Langit: The Series (RCTI, 2013)
- Catatan Hati Seorang Istri (RCTI, 2014–2016)
- 7 Manusia Harimau (RCTI, 2014–2016)
- Anak Jalanan (RCTI, 2015–2017)
- Anugerah Cinta (RCTI, 2016–2017)
- Anak Langit (SCTV, 2017–present)
- Orang Ketiga (SCTV, 2018)
- Cinta Anak Muda (SCTV, 2019)
- Samudra Cinta (SCTV, 2019–present)
- Jangan Panggil Gue Pak Haji (SCTV, 2019)
- Kisah Cinta Anak Tiri (SCTV, 2020–present)

== Republic of Ireland ==
- **Fair City** (1989–present)
- **Ros na Rún** (1996–present)
- Red Rock (2015–2019)
- Glenroe (1983–2001)
- The Riordans (1965–1979)
- Bracken (1978–1982)
- Tolka Row (1964–1968)
- The Kennedys of Castleross (1955–1973)

== Israel ==
- Ramat Aviv Gimmel (1995–2000)
- Kesef Catlanie (1996–1999)
- Zahav shel shotim (1994–1995)
- Cafe Paris (1996–1998)
- Ha-Mosad (1996–1997)
- Tik Denver (1998)
- Laga'at BaOsher (2001)
- Lehayey HaAhava (2002)
- City Tower (2002)
- Mischak HaHaim (2003)
- Ahava Me'ever LaPina (2003–2005)
- Ha-Chatzer (2003)
- Michaela (2004)
- HaShir Shelanu (2004–2007)
- Telenovela Ba'am (2005)
- HaAlufa (2006–2007, 2009)
- Bubot (2007–2008)
- Hasufim (2008–2009)
- Neshot Htayasim (2009)
- Tichon HaShir Shelanu (2009–2010)

== Italy ==
- Agrodolce (2008–2009)
- Caro domani (1999–2000)
- CentoVetrine (2001–2016)
- Cuori rubati (2002–2003)
- **Il paradiso delle signore** (2015–present)
- Incantesimo (1997–2008)
- In nome della famiglia (1995)
- Ricominciare (2000–2001)
- Sottocasa (2006)
- **Un posto al sole** (1996–present)
- Vivere (1999–2008)

== Jamaica ==
- **Royal Palm Estate** (1994–present)
- **The Blackburns** (2009–present)
- Lime Tree Lane (1970–1997)

== Japan ==
- Be Nice to People
- Cheap Love
- Food Fight
- Golden Bowl
- Good Luck!! (1996, 2003)
- Home&Away
- Ko-Ko-Ro
- Love Generation
- Otousan
- Pride
- Refrain
- Water Boys
- Wedding Planner

== Kazakhstan ==
- Perekryostok (Crossroads) (1996–2000)
- Sarancha (Locust) (2001–2003)
- Zhanym (My Love) (2010–2012)
- **Perekryostok v Astane (Crossroads in Astana)** (2014–present)

== Latvia ==
- UgunsGrēks
- Viņas melo labāk
- Svešā seja

== Lebanon ==
- When the Soil Cries (2012)
- The Crazy Love
- Amelia
- And the Sun Has Shined
- The Returner
- Root
- Goodbye
- Ruby
- Ajyal
- Love Duets
- Luna
- Sarah
- Madame Carmen
- Casanova
- Kinda
- The Mask
- The Runnaway
- Beautiful Liar
- Teenagers
- The Returner
- Memory
- The First Time
- Nada the Advocate
- The Fault of my Life
- The Widow and the Devil
- The Old Love
- The Last News
- The Last Night
- Between Beirut and Dubai
- The Fountains
- Family
- Knight of Dreams
- Torn Roses
- Little Sins
- The Despot
- Era of Women
- The Prisoner
- My Son
- The Stranger
- Without Memory
- Beb Idris
- The Winners
- Zahia Said That
- Inn
- Teacher's Son
- Flying Eagles
- Story of Amel
- My Cousins, My Daughter, and I
- My Wife and I
- My Wife, My Son, and I
- Mariana
- Abdo and Abdo
- A man from the Past
- The Flower of the Autumn
- Doctor Hala
- Al Sharoura
- Dream of May
- The Corner
- Nidal
- Jamile and Jamilee
- Neighbors
- Sign 13
- Broken Bird
- Something Powerful
- Chance
- The Falling of a Woman
- A Love Step
- Forbidden Love
- To Yara
- A Beat of Heart
- Spot of Love
- Like a Lie
- She and She
- Cords in the Air
- Scenario
- Approximately a Love Story
- From all my Heart
- The Team
- Life is Drama

== Lithuania ==
- Nekviesta meilė (2007–2010)
- **Moterys meluoja geriau** (2008–present)
- Giminės (1993) (2007)
- Broliai (2008–2009)

== Malaysia ==
- Fajar Di Bumi Permata (1973–1981)
- Opah (1982–2000; 2013–2014)
- Wardah (1990–1993)
- City of the Rich (1996–1997)
- Idaman (1997–2004)-312 episodes
- Manjalara (2007–2008)
- Pelajaran Hidup (2011)
- Hanya Cinta (2011)

== Morocco ==
- Komar Soltane (2005–2006)

== Nigeria ==
- Dadin kowa
- Kwana casa'in
- Gidan badamasi
- Labarin a.
- Tinsel (2008–present)-3255 episode

== Netherlands ==
- Bon Bini Beach (2002–2003)
- Foreign Affairs (1992)
- Glazen huis, Het (4 September 2004 – 4 February 2005)
- **Goede tijden, slechte tijden** (GTST) (1 October 1990–present)
- Goudkust (11 March 1996 – 28 February 2001)
- Het Huis Anubis (26 September 2006 – 4 December 2009)
- Lotte (26 February 2006 – 9 April 2007)
- Malaika (25 March 2013 – 31 May 2013)
- Nieuwe Tijden (4 July 2016 – 2018)
- Onderweg Naar Morgen (3 January 1994 – 14 May 2010)
- Oude Noorden, Het (1993)
- Rijk & Ongelukkig (12 January 2005 – 2005)
- **Spangas** (7 September 2007 – present)
- StartUp (6 January 2014 – 18 April 2014)
- Topstars (26 October 2004 – 29 December 2006)
- Westenwind (1999–2003)
- ZOOP (7 April 2004 – June 2006)
- Van Jonge Leu en Oale Groond (2 October 2005 – 2009)
- Het Huis Anubis en de Vijf van het Magische Zwaard (17 March 2010 – 2011)

== New Zealand ==
- City Life (1996–1998)
- Close to Home (1975–1983)
- Country GP (1984–1985)
- Gloss (1987–1989)
- Shark in the Park (1989–1992)
- Homeward Bound (1992)
- Jackson's Wharf (1999–2001)
- **Shortland Street** (1992–present)
- The Tribe (1999–2003)
- **Korero Mai** (2000–present; Māori soap opera)
- Pukemanu (1971–1972)
- Whānau (Learning Māori soap opera)
- **You Me Now** (2010–present; Radio New Zealand soap)

== Norway ==
- Familiesagaen De syv søstre (1996–2000)
- Hotel Cæsar (1998–2017)
- Offshore (1996–1999)
- Venner og Fiender (1996–2000)

== Poland ==
- Adam i Ewa (2000–2001)
- Apetyt na życie (2010)
- **Barwy szczęścia** (2007–present)
- BrzydUla (2008–2020)
- Czułość i kłamstwa (1999–2000)
- Dwie strony medalu (2007)
- Egzamin z życia (2005–2008)
- Galeria (2012)
- **Klan** (1997–present)
- Kopciuszek (2006–2007)
- Linia życia (2011)
- **M jak miłość** (2000–present)
- Majka (2010)
- Marzenia do spełnienia (2001–2002)
- Miasteczko (2000–2001)
- **Na dobre i na złe** (1999–present)
- **Na Wspólnej** (2003–present)
- Pensjonat pod Różą (2004–2006)
- **Pierwsza miłość** (2004–present)
- Plebania (2000–2012)
- Prosto w serce (2010–2011)
- Radio Romans (1994–1995)
- Rezydencja (2011–2012)
- Samo Życie (2002–2010)
- Tylko miłość (2007–2009)
- W labiryncie (1988–1991)
- Warto kochać (2005–2007)
- Więzy krwi (2001)
- Wszystko przed nami (2012–2013)
- Złotopolscy (1998–2010)
- Życie jak poker (1998–1999)

== Puerto Rico ==
- Alejandra
- Coralito
- Cristina Bazán
- De qué color es el amor
- Dueña y Señora
- El Idolo
- Good American Family
- Julieta, Una Historia de Amor
- Karina Montaner
- La Isla
- La Otra
- La Sombra de Belinda
- La Verdadera Eva
- Laura Guzmán, Culpable
- Milly
- Pacto de amor
- Preciosa
- Rojo Verano
- Tanairí
- Vida
- Yara Prohibida
- Yo Sé Que Mentía (1982)

== Romania ==
=== Media Pro Pictures ===
- Numai iubirea (2004–2005)
- Păcatele Evei (2005–2006)
- Lacrimi de iubire (2005–2006)
- Daria, iubirea mea (2006–2007)
- Iubire ca în filme (2006–2007)
- Inima de ţigan (2007–2008)
- Regina (2008–2009)
- Iubire și onoare (2010–2011)

=== Intact Production & La Dolce Vita Production ===
- Secretul Mariei (2005–2006)
- Vocea Inimii (2006–2007)
- Clanul Spranceana (2007–2008)

== Slovakia ==
- Medzi nami (2005–2006)
- Ordinácia v ružovej záhrade (2007–2012)
- Panelák (2008–2015)
- Búrlivé víno (2013–2017)
- Chlapi neplacú (2013–2015)

== Slovenia ==
- Strasti ("Passions") (2008)
- Ena žlahtna štorija ("A Noble Story") (2015–2017)
- Usodno vino ("Fatal Wine") (2015–2017)
- '**Ena žlahtna štorija: Mlada ljubezen'** ("A Noble Story: Young Love") (spin-off of "A Noble Story")
- Reka ljubezni ("A River of Love")

== Serbia ==
- Ceo život za godinu dana (1971)
- Gore-dole (1996–1997)
- Lisice (2002–2003)
- Hotel sa 7 zvezdica (2002–2003)
- Selo gori, a baba se češlja (2007–2017)
- Ranjeni orao (2008–2009)
- Greh njene majke (2009)
- Nepobedivo srce (2010–2011)
- Žene sa Dedinja (2011–2015)
- Vojna akademija (2012–2019)
- Samac u braku (2013)
- Sudbine (2013–2015)
- Jedne letnje noći (2015)
- Sumnjiva lica (2016–2017)
- Igra sudbine (2020–present)
- Dinastija (2021)
- Zakopane tajne (2023–2024)
- Pelagijin venac (2025–present)

== South Africa ==
- Egoli: Place of Gold (1992–2010)
- Generations (1993–2014)
- Muvhango (1997–2025)
- Isidingo (1998–2020)
- Backstage (2000–2007)
- 7de Laan (2000–2023)
- Villa Rosa (2004–2016)
- Scandal! (2005–2026)
- Binnelanders (2005–present)
- Rhythm City (2007–2021)
- The Wild (2011–2013)
- Skeem Saam (2011–present)
- Generations: The Legacy (2014–present, remake of the original Generations)
- Uzalo (2015–present)
- Suidooster (2015–present)
- Getroud Met Rugby - Die Sepie (2016–2022)
- The Queen (2016–2023)
- Imbewu: The Seed (2018–2023)
- Arendsvlei (2018–2024)
- The River (2018–2024)
- Legacy (2020–2022)
- Gomora (2020–2023)
- House of Zwide (2021–2026)
- Diepe Waters (2022–present)
- Gqeberha: The Empire (2023–2025)
- Kelders van Geheime (2024–2026)
- Paradys (2026-present)

== South Korea ==
- Alone in Love (2006)
- Summer Scent (2003)
- Winter Sonata (2002)
- Moraeshigae (Hourglass/Sandglass) (1995)
- Dae Jang Geum (A Jewel in the Palace) - also popular in Hong Kong (대장금)
- Hur Jun (also called "The Way of Medicine")
- Damo (다모)
- Sea God, also known as Emperor of the Sea
- Bulmyeolei Yi Sun Shin (The Immortal Yi Soon-Shin)
- All In (올인)
- Full House
- Hotelier (호텔리어)
- I'm Sorry, I Love You
- The Third Republic
- Love Story in Harvard
- My Name is Kim Sam Soon (내이름은 김삼순)
- Sad Sonata (슬픈연가)
- City Hunter
- Faith
- Sangdo, Merchants of Joseon (상도)

== Spain ==
- La granja (1989–1992)
- El oro y el barro (1991–1992)
- Goenkale (1994–2015)
- Poble Nou (1994–1994)
- Secrets De Família (1995)
- Nissaga de Poder (1996–1998)
- El súper: Historias de todos los días (1996–1999)
- Al salir de clase (1997–2002)
- Calle nueva (1997–2000)
- Laberint d'ombres (1998–2000)
- Mareas Vivas (1998–2002)
- Ambiciones (1998)
- Plaza Alta (1998–2000)
- Nada es para siempre (1999–2000)
- El Cor de la Ciutat (2000–2009)
- Arrayán (2001–2013)
- El secreto (2001)
- Esencia de poder (2001)
- Temps de Silenci (2001–2002)
- 20 tantos (2002–2003)
- La Verdad de Laura (2002)
- Géminis, Venganza de amor (2002–2003)
- Luna negra (2003–2004)
- Tres son multitud (2003)
- Ventdelplà (2005–2010)
- Amar en tiempos revueltos (2005–2012)
- Negocis de família (2005–2007)
- El auténtico Rodrigo Leal (2005)
- Obsesión (2005)
- Yo soy Bea (2006–2009)
- SMS (2006–2007)
- Amistades peligrosas (2006)
- La dársena de poniente (2006–2007)
- **L'Alqueria Blanca** (2007–present)
- Les moreres (2007–2013)
- C.L.A. No somos ángeles (2007)
- 18, la serie (2008–2009)
- HKM (2008–2009)
- Lalola (2008–2009)
- Mi gemela es hija única (2008–2009)
- Los exitosos Pells (2009)
- El porvenir es largo (2009)
- Somos cómplices (2009)
- Gavilanes (2010–2011)
- Valientes (2010)
- El secreto de Puente Viejo (2011–2020)
- Bandolera (2011–2013)
- Amar es para siempre (2013–2024; sequel series of Amar en tiempos revueltos)
- Gran Reserva: El origen (2013)
- Ciega a citas (2014)
- Acacias 38 (2015–2021)
- Seis hermanas (2015–2017)
- Centro médico (2015–2019)
- Yo quisiera (2015–2018)
- Servir y proteger (2017–2023)
- **Com si fos ahir** (2017–present)
- Mercado Central (2019–2021)
- Derecho a soñar (2019)
- Dos Vidas (2021–2022)
- Mía es la venganza (2023)
- **4 estrellas** (2023–2024)
- **La Promesa** (2023–present)
- **La Moderna** (2023–present)
- **Sueños de libertad** (2024–present)
- **Regreso a Las Sabinas** (2024–present)
- **Valle Salvaje** (2024–present)

== Sri Lanka ==
- Andara Veta
- **Kopi Kade** (1987–present)
- Batti
- Paba
- Muthu Kirilli
- Amaa
- Malee
- **Deweni Inima** (2017–present)
- Sangeethe (2019–present)

== Sweden ==
- Hem till byn (1971–2006)
- Rederiet (1992–2002)
- Vänner och Fiender (1996–2000)
- Nya tider (1999–2003)
- Skilda världar (1996–2001)
- Vita lögner (1997–2002)
- Tre kronor (1994–1999)
- Varuhuset (1987–1989)
- Hotel Seger (2000–2001)
- Andra Avenyn (2007–2010)

== Switzerland ==
- Lüthi und Blanc (1999–2007)

== Tamil Language (India, Singapore, Sri Lanka) ==
- Anandham (ஆனந்தம்) (2003–2009)
- Andal Alagar (ஆண்டாள் அழகர்) (2014–2016)
- Annamalai (அண்ணாமலை) (2002–2005)
- Azhagi (அழகி) (2011–2016)
- Bommalattam (பொம்மலாட்டம்) (2012–2016)
- Chellamay (செல்லமே) (2009–2013)
- Chithi (சித்தி) (1999–2001)
- Deivam thandha Veedu (தெய்வம் தந்த வீடு) (2013–2017)
- Deivamagal (தெய்வமகள்) (2013–2018)
- Idhayam (இதயம்) (2009–2012)
- Kalki (கல்கி) (2004–2006)
- Kana Kaanum Kaalangal(கனா காணும் காலங்கள்) (2006–2009)
- Nandini (நந்தினி) (2017–2020)
- Office (ஆபீஸ்) (2013–2015)
- Saravanan Meenatchi (Season 1) (சரவணன் மீனாட்சி) (2011–2013)
- Tamil Kadavul Murugan (தமிழ் கடவுள் முருகன்) (2017–2018)
- **Thalayanai Pookal (தலையணைப் பூக்கள்)** (2016–2018)
- Thangam (தங்கம்) (2009–2013)
- Uravugal (உறவுகள்) (2009–2012)
- Vallamai Tharayo (வல்லமை தாராயோ) (2016)
- **Yaaradi Nee Mohini (யாரடி நீ மோகினி)** (2017–2021)

== Turkey ==
- Cennetin Sırları (2011)
- Derin Sular (2011)
- Ferhunde Hanımlar (1993–1999)
- Unutma Beni (2008–2016)
- **Deniz Yıldızı** (2009–2015)
- Dinle Sevgili (2011–2012)
- İki Dünya Arasında (2012–2015)
- **Beni Affet** (2012–2018)
- Şeytanın Gözyaşları (1998)
- Fırtınalı Aşk (2007)
- **Aşkın Bedeli** (2013–2015)
- Kara Melek (1997–2000)
- Rüzgarlı Sokak (2013)
- Elif (2014–2019)
- Kara Sevda (2015–2017)
- Aşk Laftan Anlamaz (2016–2017)

== United Kingdom ==
- Front Line Family (1941–1948)
- Mrs Dale's Diary (1948–1969)
- **The Archers** (1950, 1951–present)
- The Appleyards (1952–1957)
- The Grove Family (1954–1957, 1991)
- Emergency – Ward 10 (1957–1967)
- **Coronation Street** (1960–present)
- Compact (1962–1965)
- Dr Finlay's Casebook (1962–1971)
- Crossroads (1964–1988, 2001–2003)
- 199 Park Lane (1965)
- United! (1965–1967)
- The Newcomers (1965–1969)
- Weavers Green (1966)
- Market in Honey Lane (1967–1969)
- High Living (1968–1971)
- Waggoners' Walk (1969–1980)
- General Hospital (1972–1979)
- **Emmerdale** (1972–present)
- Crown Court (1973–1984)
- **Pobol y Cwm** (1974–present)
- Angels (1975–1983)
- Garnock Way (1976–1979)
- The Cedar Tree (1976–1979)
- Grange Hill (1978–2008)
- Take the High Road (1980–2003)
- Together (1980–1981)
- Triangle (1981–1983)
- Brookside (1982–2003)
- The Bill (1983–2010)
- Gems (1985–1988)
- Albion Market (1985–1986)
- The Practice (1985–1986)
- Howards' Way (1985–1990)
- **EastEnders** (1985–present)
- Acorn Antiques (1985–1986)
- **Casualty** (1986–present)
- Citizens (1987–1991)
- Park Avenue (1988–1992)
- Byker Grove (1989–2006)
- Jupiter Moon (1990, 1996)
- Families (1990–1993)
- Family Pride (1991–1992)
- Eldorado (1992–1993)
- Heartbeat (1992–2010)
- Machair (1992–1998)
- Revelations (1994–1996)
- Castles (1995)
- **Rownd a Rownd** (1995–present)
- **Hollyoaks** (1995–present)
- Canary Wharf (1996)
- Springhill (1996–1997)
- London Bridge (1996–1999)
- Quayside (1997)
- Family Affairs (1997–2005)
- Dream Team (1997–2007)
- Westway (1997–2005)
- Holby City (1999–2022)
- Doctors (2000–2024)
- Night and Day (2001–2003)
- Footballers' Wives (2002–2006)
- Chalkhill Lives (2002–2009)
- **River City** (2002–2026)
- Mile High (2003–2005)
- Silver Street (2004–2010)
- Hollyoaks: In The City (2006)
- The Chase (2006–2007)
- Hotel Babylon (2006–2009)
- **Waterloo Road** (2006–2015, 2023–present)
- HolbyBlue (2007–2008)
- Echo Beach (2008)
- The Royal Today (2008)
- Hollyoaks Later (2008-2013, 2020, 2025)
- EastEnders: E20 (2010–2011)
- The Windsors (2016-2023)
- Ackley Bridge (2017-2022)
- **Hope Street** (2021–present)
- Tracey: A Day in the Life (2024)
- Corriedale (2026)

== United States ==
=== Radio serials ===
- The Goldbergs (1929–1950)
- Clara, Lu, and Em (1930–1942)
- Painted Dreams (1930–1943)
- Myrt and Marge (1931–1942)
- Judy and Jane (1932–1935)
- Just Plain Bill (1932–1955)
- One Man's Family (1932–1959)
- Pepper Young's Family (1932–1959)
- Today's Children (1933–1938, 1943–1950)
- Ma Perkins (1933–1960)
- The Romance of Helen Trent (1933–1960)
- Girl Alone (1935–1941)
- The O'Neills (1935–1943)
- Bachelor's Children (1935–1946)
- Backstage Wife (1935–1959)
- Dan Harding's Wife (1936–1938)
- Second Husband (1936–1946)
- David Harum (1936–1950)
- Big Sister (1936–1952)
- Our Gal Sunday (1936–1959)
- Kitty Keene, Incorporated (1937–1941)
- Aunt Jenny's Real Life Stories (1937–1955)
- Lorenzo Jones (1937–1955)
- Stella Dallas (1937–1955)
- The Guiding Light (1937–1956)
- Jane Arden (1938–1939)
- Your Family and Mine (1938–1940)
- Valiant Lady (1938–1952)
- Life Can Be Beautiful (1938–1954)
- Young Widder Brown (1938–1956)
- When a Girl Marries (1939–1957)
- Young Doctor Malone (1939–1960)
- Adopted Daughter (1939–1941)
- Against the Storm (1939–1952)
- Amanda of Honeymoon Hill (1940–1946)
- Portia Faces Life (1940–1953)
- Lonely Women (1942–1943)
- Perry Mason (1943–1955)
- Rosemary (1944–1955)
- Aunt Mary (1944–1961)
- The Second Mrs. Burton (1946–1960)
- The Brighter Day (1948–1956)

=== Daytime television ===
- These Are My Children (1949)
- A Woman to Remember (1949)
- Hawkins Falls (1950–1955)
- The First Hundred Years (1950–1952)
- Miss Susan (1951)
- The Egg and I (1951-1952)
- Love of Life (1951–1980)
- Search for Tomorrow (1951–1986)
- Guiding Light (1952–2009)
- The Bennetts (1953-1954)
- Follow Your Heart (1953-1954)
- Three Steps to Heaven (1953–1954)
- Valiant Lady (1953–1957)
- A Time to Live (1954)
- Concerning Miss Marlowe (1954-1955)
- First Love (1954–1955)
- One Man's Family (1954–1955)
- Portia Faces Life (1954–1955)
- Golden Windows (1954–1955)
- The Greatest Gift (1954-1955)
- The Road of Life (1954-1955)
- The World of Mr. Sweeney (1954-1955)
- The Brighter Day (1954–1962)
- The Secret Storm (1954–1974)
- As the World Turns (1956–2010)
- The Edge of Night (1956–1984)
- Today is Ours (1958)
- From These Roots (1958–1961)
- Young Doctor Malone (1958–1963)
- Full Circle (1960-1961)
- The Clear Horizon (1960–1962)
- Our Five Daughters (1962)
- The Doctors (1963–1982)
- **General Hospital** (1963–present)
- A Flame in the Wind (1964–1965)
- The Young Marrieds (1964–1966)
- Peyton Place (1964–1969)
- Another World (1964–1999)
- **Days of Our Lives** (1965–2022, 2022–present)
- Morning Star (1965–1966)
- Paradise Bay (1965–1966)
- Never Too Young (1965–1966)
- The Nurses (1965–1967)
- Dark Shadows (1966–1971)
- Love Is a Many Splendored Thing (1967–1973)
- Hidden Faces (1968–1969)
- One Life to Live (1968–2012)
- Bright Promise (1969–1972)
- Where the Heart Is (1969–1973)
- The Best of Everything (1970)
- Bird of the Iron Feather (1970)
- A World Apart (1970–1971)
- Somerset (1970–1976)
- All My Children (1970–2011)
- The Best of Everything (1970)
- Return to Peyton Place (1972–1974)
- Our Street (1972–1974)
- **The Young and the Restless** (1973–present)
- How to Survive a Marriage (1974–1975)
- Ryan's Hope (1975–1989)
- Lovers and Friends/For Richer, For Poorer (1977–1978)
- Texas (1980–1982)
- Another Life (1981–1984)
- Capitol (1982–1987)
- The Catlins (1983–1985)
- Loving (1983–1995)
- Rituals (1984–1985)
- Santa Barbara (1984–1993)
- **The Bold and the Beautiful** (1987–present)
- Generations (1989–1991)
- Tribes (1990)
- Swans Crossing (1992)
- The City (1995–1997)
- Port Charles (1997–2003)
- Sunset Beach (1997–1999)
- Passions (1999–2008)
- **Beyond the Gates** (2025–present)

=== Prime time television ===
- Faraway Hill (1946)
- Highway to the Stars (1947)
- One Man's Family (1949–1952)
- Peyton Place (1964–1969)
- Paradise Bay (1965–1966)
- Harold Robbins' The Survivors (1969–1970)
- Executive Suite (1976–1977)
- Lovers and Friends (1977–1978)
- Mary Hartman, Mary Hartman (1977–1978)
- Dallas (1978–1991, 2012–2014)
- Knots Landing (1979–1993)
- Secrets of Midland Heights (1980–1981)
- Flamingo Road (1980–1982)
- Dynasty (1981–1989, 2017–2022)
- Falcon Crest (1981–1990)
- Bare Essence (1983)
- The Hamptons (1983)
- Hotel (1983–1988)
- Paper Dolls (1984)
- Berrenger's (1985)
- The Colbys (1985–1987)
- Beverly Hills, 90210 (1990–2000)
- 2000 Malibu Road (1992)
- Melrose Place (1992–1999, 2009–2010)
- Winnetka Road (1994)
- Models Inc. (1994–1995)
- The Monroes (1995)
- Central Park West (1995–1996)
- Malibu Shores (1996)
- Savannah (1996–1997)
- Pacific Palisades (1997)
- Push (1998)
- Undressed (1999–2002)
- Titans (2000)
- Pasadena (2001)
- Spyder Games (2001)
- North Shore (2004–2005)
- Desperate Housewives (2004–2012)
- Sex, Love & Secrets (2005)
- Dante's Cove (2005–2007)
- Point Pleasant (2005)
- Desire (2006)
- Fashion House (2006)
- American Heiress (2007)
- Saints & Sinners (2007)
- Watch Over Me (2006–2007)
- Wicked Wicked Games (2006–2007)
- Cane (2007)
- General Hospital: Night Shift (2007–2008)
- Revenge (2011–2015)
- Nashville (2012–2018)
- Deception (2013)
- Devious Maids (2013–2016)
- The Haves and the Have Nots (2013–2021)
- Hit the Floor (2013–2018)
- Mistresses (2013–2016)
- If Loving You Is Wrong (2014–2020)
- Blood & Oil (2015)
- Empire (2015–2020)
- The Royals (2015–2018)
- Greenleaf (2016–2020)
- Ambitions (2019)
- Grand Hotel (2019)
- Tiny Pretty Things (2020)

=== Web series ===
- All My Children (2013)
- **Anacostia** (2009–present)
- As the Cookie Crumbles (2008)
- **The Bay** (2010–present)
- Beacon Hill (2014–2015)
- The Cavanaughs (2010–2011)
- **Days of Our Lives** (2022–present)
- DeVanity (2011–2014)
- East Los High (2013–2017)
- EastSiders (2012–2020)
- Miss Behave (2010–2012)
- One Life to Live (2013)
- Ragged Isle (2011–2014)
- River Ridge (2012)
- The Spot (1995–1997)
- Tainted Dreams (2013–2017)
- They Go On (1997)
- Venice: The Series (2009–2021)
- What If... (2010)
- Winterthorne (2015)
- **Youthful Daze** (2012–present)

== Uruguay ==
- Las novias de Travolta (2009)
- Porque te quiero así (2011–2012)
- Dance! (2011)

== See also ==
- List of telenovelas
- List of GL dramas
- List of BL dramas
