= Mascha Müller =

German actress (born 1984)

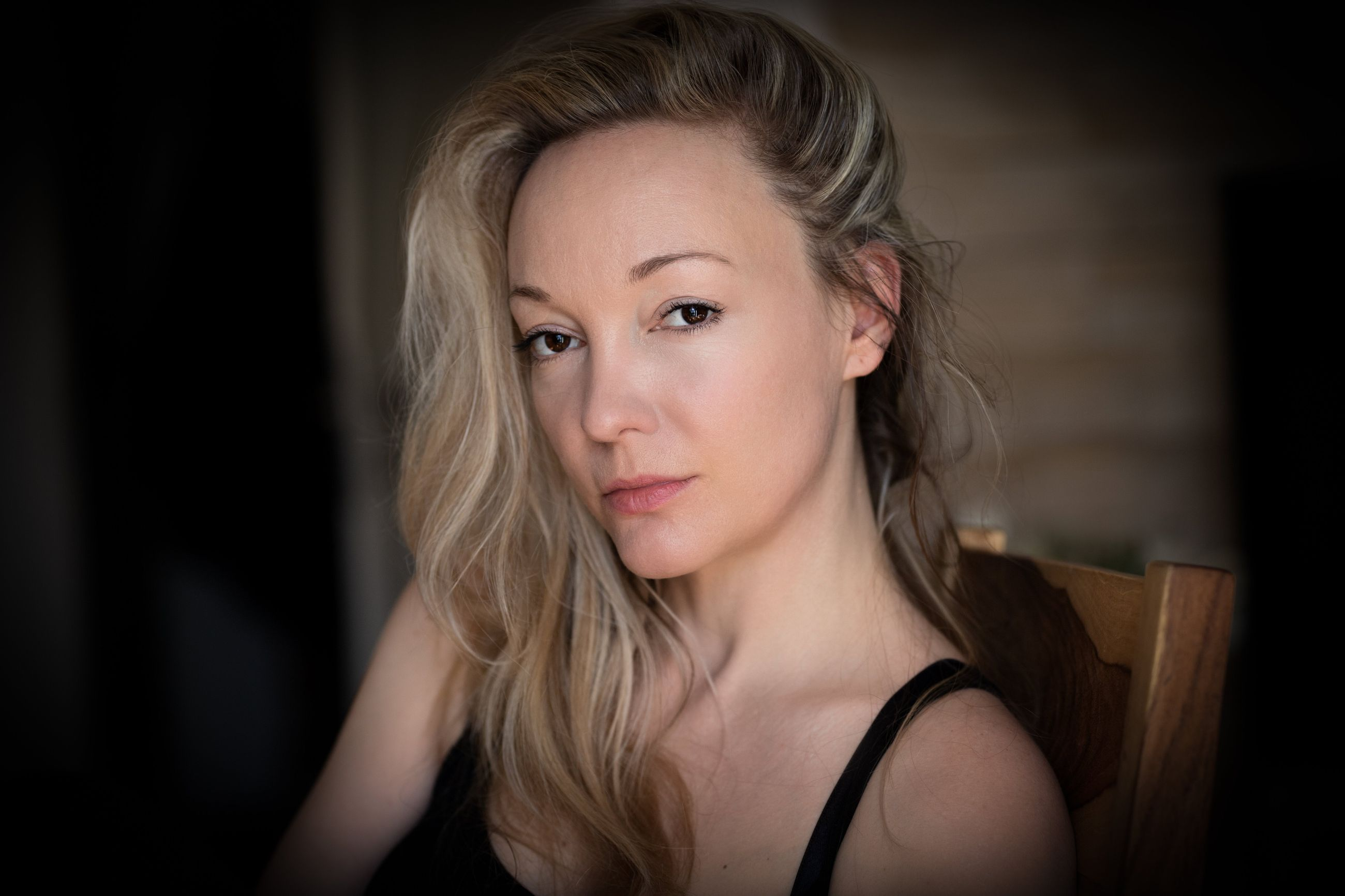
- Born: Mascha Müller; May 8, 1984 (age 41); Munich, Bavaria, West Germany
- Occupation: Actress
- Years active: 2000-present
- Website: http://www.mascha-mueller.de

Mascha Müller (born May 8, 1984 in Munich, West Germany) is a German actress and best known for her role as Luise von Waldensteyck on the soap opera Verbotene Liebe (Forbidden Love).

Mascha began acting with sixteen on a little stage, called Bühne Moosberg, which was founded by her mother, playing the role of the legendary Anne Frank. She succeeded her acting schooling on the International School for Acting in Munich. Her first television roles were little parts in the crime solving show Aktenzeichen XY… ungelöst and the scripted documentary Die Abschlussklasse. After that she became guest parts in the primetime sitcom Hausmeister Krause – Ordnung muss sein and in the telenovelas Storm of Love and Lotta in Love, followed by main parts in stage plays in Munich. In 2007, Mascha took the part of Vanessa Eichoff in the short-lived soap opera Maple Avenue. In November 2007, she started filming for Verbotene Liebe and was first seen on-screen on January 21, 2009 in the role of Luise von Waldensteyck. With a fast popularity by the audience it became her biggest success yet.

== Filmography ==
- 2005: Aktenzeichen XY… ungelöst (segment: 'Bankraub') as bank assistant
- 2005: Die Abschlussklasse (1 episode) as transvestite
- 2007: Maple Avenue (contract role) as Vanessa Eichhoff
- 2008: Der Bulle von Tölz (episode: 'Das Ende aller Sitten') as Jana Fitz
- 2009–present: Verbotene Liebe (contract role) as Luise von Waldensteyck
- 2009: Pfarrer Braun (episode: 'Glück auf! Der Mörder kommt!') as Ulla Wiehr
