= List of films shot at the British Museum =

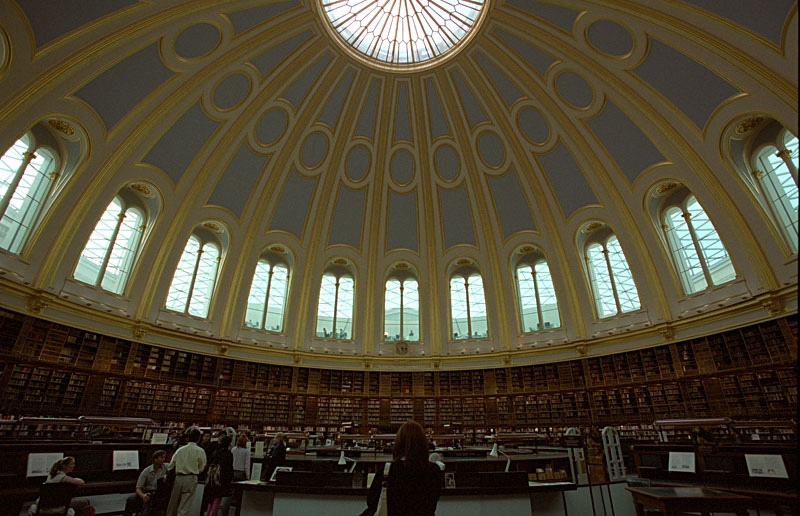
The Reading Room in the British Museum as it appeared in 2004. Used in many films as a backdrop including Hitchcock's Blackmail and Zinnemann's The Day of the Jackal.

Several films have featured the British Museum in London as part of their plot, with scenes filmed at the location.

- The Wakefield Case (1921): Four rubies belonging to the British Museum are stolen. A man called Wakefield is killed after trying to capture two brothers in possession of the jewels. His son (Wakefield Jr), a playwright, investigates and follows a woman whom he suspects of his father’s murder across the Atlantic to the US. Wakefield eventually solves the case and falls in love with the woman, who was in fact a Secret Service agent working under cover as a member of the gang.
- Blackmail (1929): Blackmail features a chase scene around the British Museum, although due to low light inside the building, the director Alfred Hitchcock made do with blown-up photographs as studio backdrops. The last shot of the film is the dome of the Reading Room.
- Bulldog Jack (1935): A comedy thriller which ends in a chase through a secret (fictitious) tunnel from ‘Bloomsbury’ underground station (clearly modelled on the British Museum underground station which closed in September 1933, not long before this film was made) to the Egyptian room at the Museum. The film features the British Museum in the story line, but was filmed at Shepherd's Bush Studios.
- Phaedra (1962): Jules Dassin's 1962 film Phaedra was an updated version of Euripides' Hippolytus. Melina Mercouri plays the eponymous tragic heroine who falls in love with her stepson, Alexis/Hippolytus, played by Anthony Perkins. In the film, Phaedra meets her stepson for the first time in the British Museum's Duveen Gallery where the Parthenon sculptures are displayed.
- The Ipcress File (1965): An encounter between hero and villain, though using the exterior of the Royal School of Mines in South Kensington, used as the interior location a library at the British Museum (not the main reading room).
- Day of the Jackal (1973): The Jackal is seen researching at the British Museum reading room.
- The Awakening (1980)
- Maurice (1987): The film is based on the novel by E. M. Forster (written 1913–, published posthumously 1971). In this scene, Maurice bumps into his old schoolmaster (Simon Callow) by the Assyrian sculptures.
- The Mummy Returns (2001): The British Museum is the new home for Imhotep. A British Museum curator Baltus Hafez (Alun Armstrong) leads a cult who have resurrected the ancient Egyptian god Imhotep with the intent of using Imhotep's power to defeat the Scorpion King. The cult capture Alex, the eight-year-old son of Rick (Brendan Fraser) and Evelyn O'Connell (Rachel Weisz) who set off to save their son and save the world from Imhotep.
- Possession (2002): Roland Michell (Aaron Eckhart) is an American scholar working at the British Museum as a research assistant to Professor Blackadder (Tom Hickey), an expert on Randolph Henry Ash, a 19th-century English poet. One afternoon while studying Ash's Latin texts in the London Library (sequences filmed in the Arched Room in the British Museum), Roland discovers two drafts of what appear to be love letters written by Ash to the Victorian poet Christabel LaMotte. Roland takes the letters to Maud Bailey (Gwyneth Paltrow), a gender studies scholar, an expert on LaMotte who also happens to be a distant relation.
- Justice League and Wonder Woman (both 2017): Both filmed at the museum, however, Wonder Woman's scenes were not set in the museum, instead doubling for the Louvre.

== See also ==
- List of films shot at the Palace of Versailles
- List of films shot at Parkwood Estate
