= Farewell, My Queen =

2012 film

- Theatrical release poster
- Directed by: Benoît Jacquot
- Screenplay by: Benoît Jacquot; Gilles Taurand
- Based on: Les Adieux à la reine by Chantal Thomas
- Produced by: Jean-Pierre Guérin; Kristina Larsen
- Starring: Diane Kruger; Léa Seydoux; Virginie Ledoyen; Noémie Lvovsky
- Cinematography: Romain Winding
- Edited by: Luc Barnier; Nelly Ollivault
- Music by: Bruno Coulais
- Distributed by: Ad Vitam Distribution
- Release dates: 9 February 2012 (Berlin); 21 March 2012 (France)
- Running time: 100 minutes
- Countries: France; Spain
- Language: French
- Budget: $8.1 million
- Box office: $6.4 million

Farewell, My Queen (French: Les Adieux à la reine) is a 2012 French drama film directed by Benoît Jacquot and based on the novel of the same name by Chantal Thomas, who won the Prix Femina in 2002. It gives a fictional account of the last days of Marie Antoinette in power seen through the eyes of Sidonie Laborde, a young servant who reads aloud to the queen. The film stars Diane Kruger as the Queen, Léa Seydoux, and Virginie Ledoyen. It opened the 62nd Berlin International Film Festival in February 2012 and has subsequently been screened at other festivals. It was released on 21 March 2012 in France.

== Plot ==
In 1789, on the eve of the French Revolution, the court at the Palace of Versailles still live their routines, relatively unconcerned by the increasing turmoil in Paris a mere twenty miles away. The routines are seen through the eyes of the young Sidonie Laborde, who serves Queen Marie Antoinette.

When news about the storming of the Bastille reaches the Court, most aristocrats and servants desert the Palace and abandon the royal family, fearing that the government is falling. But Sidonie, a true believer in the monarchy, refuses to flee. She feels secure under the protection of the royal family. She does not know these are the last three days she will spend by the queen's side.

The queen orders Sidonie to disguise herself as Yolande Martine Gabrielle de Polastron, Duchess of Polignac, and serve as bait so that the latter can safely flee to Switzerland. This Sidonie does, despite a prior warning from one of the queen's ladies-in-waiting. Sidonie is stripped naked and then redressed in a green gown. The coach carrying Sidonie is also occupied by the real duchess and her husband, dressed as her servants. They treat her with disdain during the journey but she plays her role convincingly enough to enable the party to safely cross the border. As the film ends, she remarks that she has no connections other than her position as reader to the queen, and soon she will be a nobody.

== Cast ==
- Léa Seydoux as Sidonie Laborde
- Diane Kruger as Marie-Antoinette, Queen of France
- Virginie Ledoyen as Gabrielle de Polastron, duchesse de Polignac
- Xavier Beauvois as Louis XVI
- Grégory Gadebois as Louis, comte de Provence
- Francis Leplay as Charles, comte d'Artois
- Noémie Lvovsky as Jeanne-Louise-Henriette Campan
- Vladimir Consigny as Paolo
- Julie-Marie Parmentier as Honorine
- Michel Robin as Nicolas Moreau
- Lolita Chammah as Louison
- Marthe Caufman as Alice
- Jacques Boudet as Monsieur de la Tour du Pin
- Martine Chevallier as Madame de la Tour du Pin
- Jacques Nolot as Monsieur de Jolivet
- Serge Renko as Marquis de la Chesnaye
- Anne Benoît as Rose Bertin
- Dominique Reymond as Madame de Rochereuil
- Jean-Chrétien Sibertin-Blanc as Monsieur de Polignac
- Jacques Herlin as Marquis de Vaucouleurs
- Pierre Rochefort as Le valet Antonin

== Production ==
Farewell, My Queen was directed by Benoît Jacquot and based on a script by him, Chantal Thomas, and Gilles Taurand. They adapted the script from the novel of the same name by Thomas. She won the Prix Femina for her book in 2002. After reading Chantal's feminist novel, Jacquot wanted to create a film from this perspective.

German actress Diane Kruger was cast as Marie Antoinette. Recognizing that many audience members had preconceptions of Marie Antoinette, Kruger approached the role by "trying not to judge her... We have the same origins, the same age. I could relate to her as a woman." Even though Léa Seydoux was younger than the age of the lectrice character in the novel, Jacquot cast her as Laborde because "she brought this carnal dimension. She has incontrovertible sex appeal."

Jacquot also added to the plot the same-sex relationship between the queen and the Duchess of Polignac; he thought it might be possible, given women's strong relationships with each other in that time period.

== Release ==
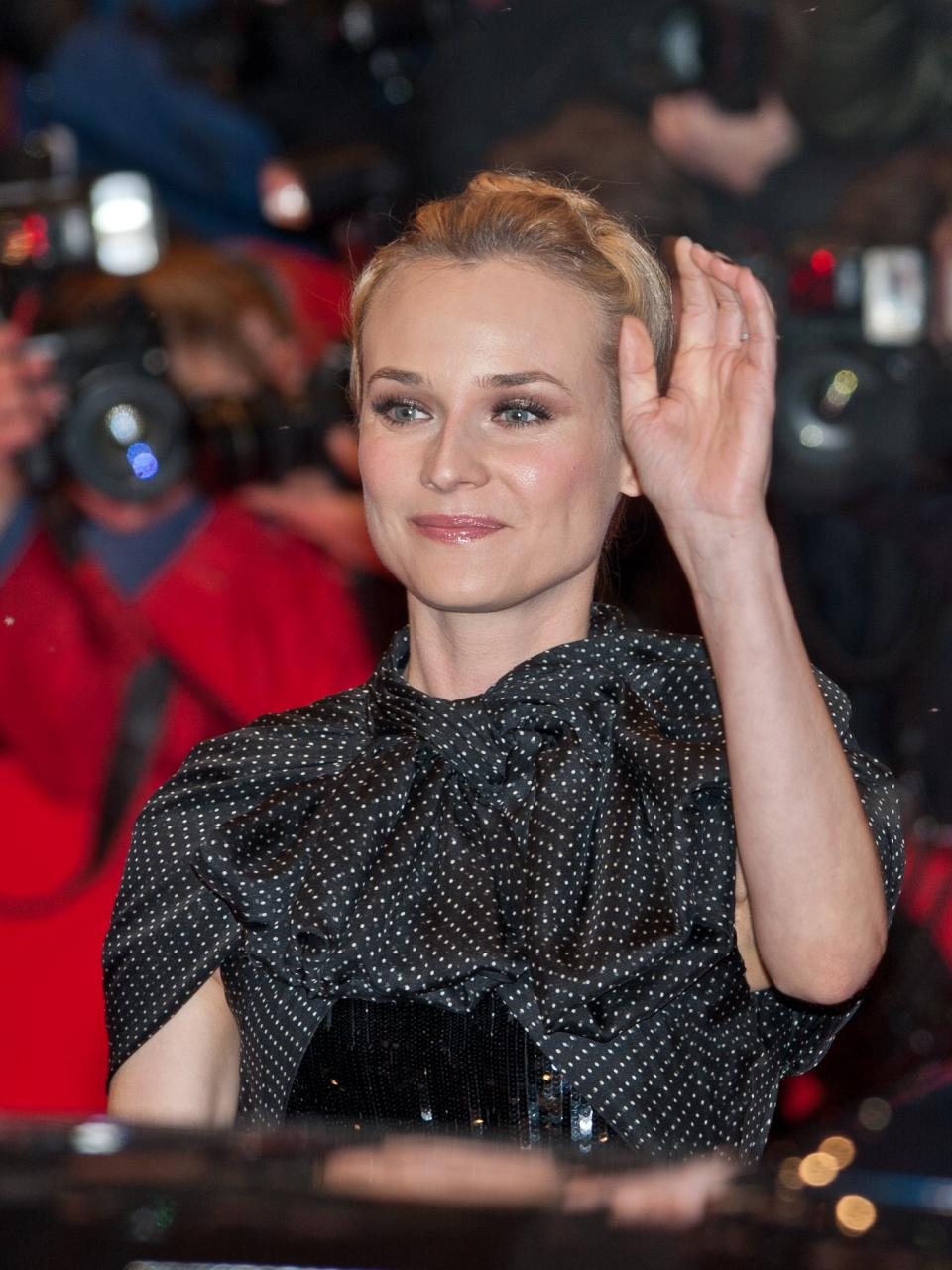
Diane Kruger promoting the film at the 62nd Berlin International Film Festival.

The film opened the 62nd Berlin International Film Festival in February 2012. It was later shown at the San Francisco International Film Festival (19 April) and the Minneapolis–Saint Paul International Film Festival (27 April) and as part of the L'Alliance Française French Film Festival, in Australia, in March 2013. Farewell, My Queen opened in theaters in France on 21 March 2012, and was released on a limited basis to American theaters on 13 July 2012.

== Reception ==
On the review aggregator website Rotten Tomatoes, 93% of 82 critics' reviews are positive. The website's consensus reads: "Farewell, My Queen transcends its gaudy period trappings to offer an affecting historical drama built on timeless - and timely - themes."Farewell, My Queen holds a rating of 67/100 on Metacritic. Several reviewers compared the film to Sofia Coppola's 2006 production, Marie Antoinette. IndieWire's Anne Thompson believed it was "an intimate and sexy period spectacle that takes us backstage at Versailles and into territory Sofia Coppola was not willing to go." Deborah Young of The Hollywood Reporter called Farewell, My Queen a "visual joy, even while its tale of a lower class girl at court infatuated with the Queen of France labors to say something relevant. Though director Benoit Jacquot opts for the grand European style of Girl with a Pearl Earring rather than a modernist rereading à la Sofia Coppola's post-punk vision Marie Antoinette, the film has its own charm, a matter-of-fact treatment of lesbianism and 'magnifique' costumes and settings guaranteed to please Upper East Side patrons, all of which suggests a wide art-house release for this lavish French-Spanish coprod."

Writing for The Independent, Geoffrey Macnab said that the director "doesn't have any grand political statements to make. He is not trying to make a sweeping melodrama either. His approach is more like that of an anthropologist, studying a tribe in its death throes. The result is quietly fascinating." Manohla Dargis of The New York Times describes Jacquot's film as a "tense, absorbing, pleasurably original look at three days in the life and lies of a doomed monarch..." She suggests that Jacquot adopted his addition of the lesbian relationship from virulent political pamphlets of the time attacking the queen.

Justin Chang, the critic of Variety magazine wrote, "Benoit Jacquot's venom-tipped account of palatial intrigue and royal oblivion scrupulously maintains a servant's-eye view but winds up holding the viewer at an unrewarding distance. Cast names should lend the picture some Euro arthouse traction, though Stateside biz won't far exceed that of Jacquot's recent work." While Chang criticized the characterization and depiction of Seydoux's character Sidonie Laborde, he praised Kruger's projection of "regal desperation" as well as Ledoyen's performance as the duchess.

== See also ==
- 2012 in film
- List of films shot at the Palace of Versailles
- List of French films of 2012
- List of lesbian, gay, bisexual or transgender-related films of 2012
