= List of films shot at the Palace of Versailles =

This is a list of the films shot at the Palace of Versailles including its interior and its palace gardens. All films listed here have the approval of the museum administration for location shooting. Some of the films have an unknown title. The dates given are the dates of shooting. A majority of the films listed were shot and released in French, with some being shot and released in English.

== 1900s ==
- Reconstitution d’une fête sous Louis XIV (1904)
- Plusieurs scènes sur Marie-Antoinette (1908) Directors: Henri Lavedan et Georges Lenôtre
- Reconstitution historique (1908) Director: Georges Fagot
- Vues cinématographiques (1909) Director: Georges Fagot

== 1910s ==
- Vues cinématographiques et reconstitution de scènes (1910) Director: Max Lyon
- Reproduction de scènes historiques de l’époque Louis XIV (1910)
- L’affaire du collier de la Reine (1911) Director: Camille de Morchon
- Vues cinématographiques (1) (1911) Director: C. Gilbert
- Vues cinématographiques (2) (1911) Director: Jacques Brindejont-Offenbach
- Vues cinématographiques (3) (1911)
- Vues cinématographiques (1) (1913)
- Vues cinématographiques en couleur (2) (1913)
- Vues cinématographiques (3) (1913) Director: Arthur Bernede
- Vue cinématographique (1915)
- Scènes cinématographiques (1916) Director: M. Rivers
- Films d’une pièce historique tirée de la guerre actuelle (1917) Director: Th. Drouvillé

== 1920s ==
- Vues cinématographiques d’un modèle réduit d’hydravion (1921)
- L’Aiglonne (1921) Directors: Emile Keppens and René Navarre
- L’enfant-roi (1923) Director: Jean Kremm
- Le vert galant (1924) Director: René Leprince
- The Princess and the Clown (1924) Director: André Hugon
- Fanfan la Tulipe (1925) Director: René Leprince
- Napoléon (1925–27) Director: Abel Gance
- The Magician (1926) Director: Rex Ingram
- Voir Versailles et mourir (1926) Director: Henri Diamant-Berger
- Printemps d’amour (1927) IMDb Director: Léonce Perret
- The Farewell Waltz (1928) Director: Henry Roussell
- La fin de Monte-Carlo (1928) IMDb Directors: Mario Nalpas et Henri Étiévant
- The Queen's Necklace (1929) Directors: Gaston Ravel et Tony Lekain
- End of the World (1929–31) Director: Abel Gance

== 1930s ==
- A Caprice of Pompadour (1930–31) Directors: Joë Hamman and Willi Wolff
- Romance à l'inconnue (1930) IMDb Director: René Barberis
- Au jardin de la Pompadour (1932) Directors: Casadesus et Taponier
- Casanova (1934) Director: René Barberis
- Qui va à la chasse ou les soins inutiles (court-métrage) (1934)
- Marie Antoinette (1938) Director: W. S. Van Dyke

== 1940s ==
- Le Mariage de Chiffon (1941) IMDb Director: Claude Autant-Lara
- Pamela (1944) Director: Pierre de Hérain
- L’affaire des poisons (1944)
- Échec au roy (1944) IMDb Director: Jean-Paul Paulin
- The Idiot (1946) Director: Georges Lampin
- The Queen's Necklace (1946) Director: Marcel L'Herbier
- La dynastie des Nguyen (1949)
- The Treasure of Cantenac (1949–50) Director: Sacha Guitry
- L’esprit de famille (1949)

== 1950s ==
- Bille de clown (1950) IMDb Director: Jean Wall
- La vie commence demain (1950) Director: Nicole Védrès
- L’homme qui marche (1951)
- Rendez-vous à Versailles (1953)
- Capitaine Pantoufle (1953) Director: Guy Lefranc
- The Earrings of Madame de… (1953) Director: Max Ophüls
- La France est un jardin (1953)
- The Lovers of Midnight (1953) Director: Roger Richebé
- La Dame aux camélias (1953) IMDb Director: Raymond Bernard
- Royal Affairs in Versailles (1953) Director: Sacha Guitry
- Napoléon (1954–55) Director: Sacha Guitry
- Unknown title (1954)
- Madame du Barry (1954) Director: Christian-Jaque
- House of Ricordi (1954) Director: Carmine Gallone
- Marie Antoinette Queen of France (1955) Director: Jean Delannoy
- Frou-Frou (1955) Director: Augusto Genina
- Unknown title (1955) Director: Raymond Larrain
- Funny Face (1956–57) Director: Stanley Donen
- Décembre, mois des enfants (1956) Director: Henri Storck
- Les Espions (1957) Director: Henri-Georges Clouzot
- The Fox of Paris (1957) Director: Paul May
- The Perfect Furlough (1957) IMDb Director: Blake Edwards
- Unknown title (1957) Director: Edouard Logereau
- Unknown title (1958) Director: Sacha Kamenka
- Le Bossu (1959) Director: André Hunebelle
- L’An II (1959)

== 1960s ==
- Petite suite pour jardins (1960)
- Un Martien à Paris (1960) IMDb Director: Jean-Daniel Daninos
- Fonderie (1960)
- Paris Blues (1960–61) Director: Martin Ritt
- Vive Henri IV, vive l'amour (1960–61) Director: Claude Autant-Lara
- Four Horsemen of the Apocalypse (1960) Director: Vincente Minnelli
- Five Day Lover (1960) Director: Philippe de Broca
- Demain Paris (1960)
- Unknown title (1960)
- Napoléon II l'Aiglon (1961) Director: Claude Boissol
- Unknown title (1961)
- Femmes de Paris (1961)
- La Fayette (1961) Director: Jean Dréville
- The Mysteries of Paris (1962) Director: André Hunebelle
- Robespierre (1962)
- Le temps des copains (1962) IMDb Director: Robert Guez
- Le temps d’Emma (1963)
- La Prima Donna (1963) IMDb Director: Philippe Lifchitz
- La Belle Vie (1963) IMDb Director: Robert Enrico
- Angélique, Marquise des Anges (1964) Director: Bernard Borderie
- El senor de la Salle (1964) IMDb Director: Luis César Amadori
- Angelique and the King (1965) Director: Bernard Borderie
- Vingt mille ans à la française (1965)
- Rose rosse per Angelica (1965) IMDb Director: Steno
- The Taking of Power by Louis XIV (1966, TV film) Director: Roberto Rossellini
- La petite vertu (1967) IMDb Director: Serge Korber
- Parlons français (1967)
- Louis XV (1967)
- Darling Lili (1967) Director: Blake Edwards
- The Tattooed One (Le Tatoué) (1968) Director: Denys de La Patellière
- La Chamade (Heartbeat) (1968) Director: Alain Cavalier

== 1970s ==
- Le moulin de Valmy (1970)
- La maison sous les arbres a.k.a. The Deadly Trap (1971) IMDb Director: René Clément
- Salut l’artiste (1973) IMDb Director: Yves Robert
- Lucien Leuwen (1973) (TV) IMDB Director: Claude Autant-Lara
- Rude journée pour la reine (1973) IMDb Director: René Allio
- Chinese in Paris (1973) IMDb Director: Jean Yanne
- Jarosław Dąbrowski (1974) IMDb Director: Bohdan Poręba
- Unknown title (1974)
- Romance in Paris (Original title Ba Li yan yu) (1975) IMDb Director: Chi Lu
- Marie-Antoinette (TV) (1975) IMDb Director: Guy-André Lefranc
- Monsieur Coffermann (1975)
- Unknown title (1975)
- Saint Simon (TV) (1975)
- Guerres civiles en France (1976) IMDb Directors: François Barat, Joël Farges, Vincent Nordon
- Molière (1977) IMDb Director: Ariane Mnouchkine
- Unknown title (1977)
- A Little Romance (1978) IMDb Director: George Roy Hill
- Unknown title (1978)
- Le romantisme est né dans un jardin (1978)
- Eutanasia di un amore (1978) IMDb Director: Enrico Maria Salerno
- Lady Oscar (1978) IMDb Director: Jacques Demy
- Unknown title (1978)
- Unknown title (1978)
- La manière de montrer les jardins de Versailles (1979)

== 1980s ==
- Un chien de saison (TV) (1980) IMDb Director: Bernard-Roland
- Miss (Morison's) Moberly’s ghosts (1980) IMDb Director: John Bruce
- Madame de Maintenon (TV) (1980)
- La chanson du Mal-Aimé (1981)
- La nuit de Varennes (1981) IMDb Director: Ettore Scola
- Le bourgeois gentilhomme (1981) IMDb Director: Roger Coggio
- Danton (1982) IMDb Director: Andrzej Wajda
- Marquise de Sévigné (TV) (1982)
- Vive la sociale (1983) Director: Gérard Mordillat
- Unknown title (1983)
- Les Fausses confidences (1984) Director: Daniel Maosmann
- Liberté, égalité, choucroute (1985) IMDb Director: Jean Yanne
- Mon beau-frère a tué ma soeur (1985) Director: Jacques Rouffio
- Gentille alouette (1985) Director: Sergio Castilla
- Chronos (1985) IMDb Director: Ron Fricke
- La Rumba (1986) Director: Roger Hanin
- Camille Claudel (1987) IMDb Director: Bruno Nuytten
- L’été de la Révolution (1988)IMDb Director: Lazare Iglesis
- Valmont (1988) IMDb Director: Miloš Forman
- Dangerous Liaisons (1988) IMDb Director: Stephen Frears
- Marie-Antoinette, reine d’un seul amour (TV) (1988) Director: Caroline Huppert
- Une nuit à l’Assemblée nationale (1988) Director: Jean-Pierre Mocky
- Chouans! (1988) IMDb Director: Philippe de Broca
- The Man Who Lived at the Ritz (1988) IMDb Director: Desmond Davis
- Manon Roland (1989) IMDb Director: Édouard Molinaro
- Le Radeau de la Méduse (1989) IMDb Director: Iradj Azimi
- L’Autrichienne (1989) IMDb Director: Pierre Granier-Deferre
- The Road to War (1989) IMDb Writer: Charles Wheeler

== 1990s ==
- L’homme de ma vie (1991) IMDb Director: Jean-Charles Tacchella
- Le voleur d’enfant (1991) IMDb Director: Christian de Chalonge
- Jefferson in Paris (1991) IMDb Director: James Ivory
- Ridicule (1995) IMDb Director: Patrice Leconte
- Beaumarchais, l’insolent (1995) IMDb Director: Édouard Molinaro
- L’allée du roi (1995) (TV)IMDb Director: Nina Companéez
- Les misérables (1999) IMDb Director: Josée Dayan

== 2000s ==
- Le roi danse (2000)
- La Traviata (2000) (TV)
- The Affair of the Necklace (2000) IMDb Director: Charles Shyer
- Napoléon (2001) (TV) IMDb Director: Yves Simoneau
- Dix-huit ans après (2001)
- The Young Casanova (2001) IMDb Director: Giacomo Battiato
- Les Amants réguliers (2004) IMDb Director: Philippe Garrel
- Marie-Antoinette (2006) IMDb Director: Sofia Coppola
- Un automne musical à Versailles IMDb Director: Olivier Simonnet
- Molière ou le comédien malgré lui (2006) IMDb Director: Laurent Tirard
- Jean de la Fontaine (2006) IMDb Director: Daniel Vigne
- Versailles, le rêve d’un roi (2007) IMDb Director: Thierry Binisti
- Versailles (2007) IMDb Director: Pierre Schöller
- Louis XV, le soleil noir (2009) IMDb Director: Thierry Binisti
- Nannerl, la soeur de Mozart (2009) IMDb Director: René Féret Review

== 2010s ==
- Midnight in Paris (2010) IMDb Director: Woody Allen
- 30° Couleur (2012) IMDb Director: Lucien Jean-Baptiste
- The Legendary Chevalier De Saint-George (2011) (TV) IMDb Director/Writer: Claude Ribbe
- Louis XVI, l’homme qui ne voulait pas être roi (2011) Director: Thierry Binisti
- Farewell, My Queen - Les Adieux à la Reine (2012) Director: Benoît Jacquot

== 2020s ==
- Jeanne du Barry (2023) IMDb Director: Maïwenn

== See also ==
- List of films shot at the British Museum
- List of films shot at Parkwood Estate

== Sources ==
- Liste des films tournés au domaine de Versailles
- Internet Movie Database (IMDb)
