= Het Huis Anubis =

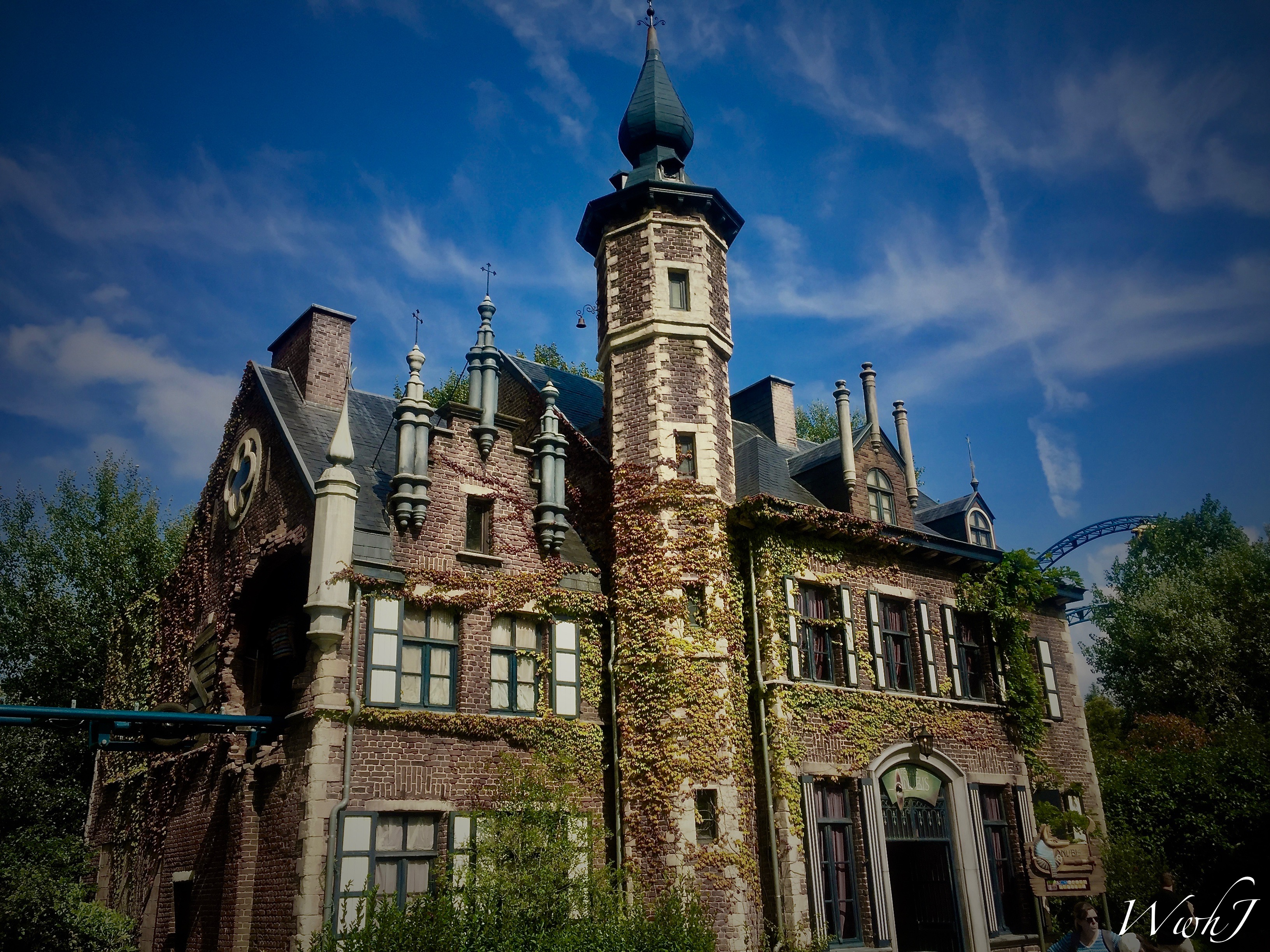
- Replica of the house used in the series
- Genre: Mystery drama
- Created by: Anjali Taneja (idea); Hans Bourlon; Gert Verhulst
- Written by: Anjali Taneja
- Starring: Loek Beernink; Iris Hesseling; Lucien van Geffen; Vincent Banic; Liliana de Vries; Vreneli van Helbergen; Achmed Akkabi; Kevin Wekker; Sven de Wijn; Marieke Westenenk; Gamze Tazim; Walter Crommelin; Patrick Wessels; Claartje Janse
- Theme music composer: Gert Verhulst; Hans Bourlon; Johan Vanden Eede
- Opening theme: Het Huis Anubis by Loek Beernink (2006); Het Geheim by Loek Beernink; Seasons 3 & 4: Kunnen Stenen Iets Vertellen? by Loek Beernink
- Composer: Johan Vanden Eede
- Countries of origin: Netherlands; Belgium
- Original language: Dutch
- No. of seasons: 4 (seasons 1, 2 and 3 were split in two parts)
- No. of episodes: 404

Production
- Executive producer: Anja Van Mensel
- Camera setup: Videotape; single-camera
- Running time: 10 minutes
- Production company: Studio 100

Original release
- Network: Nickelodeon
- Release: September 26, 2006 – December 4, 2009

Related
- Het Huis Anubis en de Vijf van het Magische Zwaard; Das Haus Anubis; House of Anubis

Het Huis Anubis (English: The House of Anubis) is a Dutch-Belgian children's television mystery drama based on elements of Egyptian mythology devised/created by Anjali Taneja, produced by Studio 100 and aired on Nickelodeon in the Netherlands and Flanders. It first aired in September 2006 and the last episode was broadcast on December 4, 2009.

The show was a large commercial and critical success in the Benelux and obtained a cult status in the Dutch-language television world. The series was dubbed and released throughout Scandinavia as well. In the Netherlands, the series quickly attracted around half a million viewers per episode. In Flanders, the series was watched by over 300.000 viewers at its peak. The series was nominated for a Rose d'Or and won numerous local television award, including the Gouden Stuiver, the most prestigious Dutch children's television prize of its time. The series finale attracted 477.000 viewers in the Netherlands, easily becoming Nickelodeon's most-watched programme in 2009.

The European success of the series made the American branch of Nickelodeon interested in producing their own remake, which eventually became House of Anubis, which was broadcast between 2011 and 2013. The American Nickelodeon producers stated to Studio 100 that they had no interest in broadcasting the original version.

== Premise ==
In Huis Anubis, a building dating from 1900 serving as an internaat, eight young people live together under the supervision of the strict manager Victor and sweet housekeeper Trudie. When newcomer Nienke Martens moves into the house, another resident, Joyce, suddenly disappears. Joyce's best friend Patricia does not trust Nienke and links her to the strange disappearance. Hoping to get Nienke expulsed out of the house, Patricia challenges Nienke to spend a night in the attic, which is forbidden terrain for the residents.

There, Nienke later makes a bizarre discovery: the recorded diary of Sarah Winsbrugge-Hennengouwen, a young girl who previously lived in the house. She discovers that Sarah's parents were archaeologists in Egypt and the original owners of Huis Anubis, who later mysteriously died in a tragic car crash after an expedition into the tomb of a pharaoh. It is revealed that the house has a secret history in relation to the expedition of the Winsbrugge-Hennengouwen pair to Egypt. Nienke decides to investigate, together with fellow resident Fabian, a nerd interested in the history of Ancient Egypt, and her roommate, Amber. Meanwhile, Patricia searches for answers about Joyce's disappearance.

While each resident has their own way of dealing with school, friends, love and growing up, some of the residents bond together to solve the mystery hidden within Huis Anubis.

== Cast ==
=== Main ===
Character (Dutch names)	Actor/Actress	Episodes	Run
Nienke Martens	Loek Beernink 11	1–404, Anubis en de Terugkeer van Sibuna	2006–2009, 2010¹
Amber Rosenberg	Iris Hesseling 11	1–404, Anubis en de Terugkeer van Sibuna	2006–2009, 2010¹
Fabian Ruitenburg	Lucien van Geffen 11	2–404, Anubis en de Terugkeer van Sibuna	2006–2009, 2010¹
Patricia Soeters	Vreneli van Helbergen 11	1-370	2006–2009²
Mick Zeelenberg	Vincent Banic 11	1-404	2006–2009¹
Mara Sabri	Liliana de Vries 0	1-147	2006-2007
Appie Tayibi	Achmed Akkabi 0	1-290	2006-2008²
Appie Tayibi	Kevin Wekker 0	290–404, Anubis en de Terugkeer van Sibuna	2021-2022-220 D
Jeroen Cornelissen	Sven de Wijn 11	2–404, Anubis en de Terugkeer van Sibuna	2006–2009, 2010
Victor Emanuel Rodenmaar	Walter Crommelin 9	1–231, 233–350, 355–400, 404	2006–2009¹
Joyce van Bodegraven	Marieke Westenenk 2	59–63, 75, 118, 124-370	2006(guest star), 2007-2009²
Noa van Rijn	Gamze Tazim 3	147-404	2007-2009³
Danny Rodenmaar	Patrick Wessels 0	370-404	2009³
Sofie Rodenmaar	Claartje Janse 0	376-404	2009³

¹ Character was seen during the entire series.

² Character left the show before it ended.

³ Character appeared later.

=== Supporting ===
Character (Dutch names)	Actor/Actress	Run	Seasons (S)
Jason Winker	Curt Fortin	2006–2007	S1-S2
Yasmine Sabri	Inge de Vries	2007	S2
Esther Verlinden	Karen Damen	2006–2007	S1-S2
Jimmy	Robert van Laar	2007–2008	S2
Vera de Kell	Elle van Rijn	2008	S2
Raven van Prijze	Hugo Metsers	2007–2008	S2
Gran Irene Martens	Roelie Westerbeek	2006–2008	S1-S2
Uncle Pierre Marant	René Retèl	2006, 2007–2009	S1-S3
Sarah Winsbrugge-Hennegouwen	Pim Lambeau	2006–2007, 2008–2009	S1, S3
Rufus Malpied¹	Just Meijer	2006–2007, 2008–2009	S1, S3-S4
Zeno Terpstra¹	Hero Muller	2006, 2007–2009	S1-S4
Ibrahim Tayibi	Sabri Saad El Hamus	2009	S3-S4
Trudie Tayibi	Magda Cnudde	2006–2009	S1-S4
Ellie van Engelen	Ingeborg Ansing	2006–2009	S1-S4
Victor Rodenmaar senior	Walter Crommelin	2008–2009	S3-S4
Marijke Rodenmaar	Trudi Klever	2009	S4
Ari van Swieten	Ton Feil	2006–2009	S1-S4
Robbie Lodewijks	Sander van Amsterdam	2006–2009	S1-S4
Anchesenamon	Meghna Kumar	2009	S4
Amneris	Ayesha Künzle	2007–2008, 2009	S2, S4
Jacob van den Berg	Evert van der Meulen	2009	S3-S4
Matthijs van den Berg	David-Jan Bronsgeest	2009	S3-S4

¹ The characters of Rufus Malpied and Zeno Terpstra would later be merged into one character (Rufus Zeno) for the English remake.

== Episodes ==
Season	Episodes	Original date	USA date
Season 1	114	2006-2007	TBA
Season 2	120	2007-2008	TBA
Season 3	120	2008-2009	TBA
Season 4	50	2009	TBA

== Spin-offs ==
After its finale, the show was followed by a spin-off, called Het Huis Anubis en de Vijf van het Magische Zwaard (The House of Anubis and the Five of the Magical Sword). This series followed another group of friends, who moved into the house from the original series after the original residents moved out and went to college. None of the actors from the original returned. The spin-off was based on Celtic mythology as opposed to Egyptian mythology.

The series started re-airing all episodes in fall 2011, after the spin-off had its finale. Even though the majority of the episodes stayed the same, the episodes were aired in widescreen (the first two seasons were originally broadcast in fullscreen) and some of the old music was replaced with newer songs. Also, other small changes and cuts were made to make the seasons look a little bit more like the later seasons (which had higher budgets).

On 6 January 2018, Spike and MTV Netherlands aired a reunion special called: #TB Het Huis Anubis in which certain cast members looked back on their time on the show. The day after, Nickelodeon started re-airing all the episodes again, starting with season 1. Just like in 2011 the first season is being aired in widescreen and some of the music has been replaced. The old opening credits were also replaced with newer visuals. The logo for the show was also slightly modified.

== International ==
=== Remakes ===
- The series was remade for Germany. The German remake, called Das Haus Anubis, debuted in September 2009 on Nick. It is filmed on exactly the same sets they used for the Dutch version and even used some of the same costumes. This version was almost identical to the original, except for the character names. However, they did make some changes to the storyline for season 2. The series was finished after the third season.
- In January 2011, an English language remake, called House of Anubis (recorded in Liverpool) debuted on Nickelodeon in the US. It used an all new set (and house) but kept almost all original character names (except Nienke, which became Nina; Appie, which became Alfie; Jeroen, which was changed to Jerome; and Joyce, which became Joy). The script was a rewritten version of the original script. This version also had a Spanish and a Brazilian Portuguese dub for Nickelodeon Latin America called El Misterio de Anubis and Mistério de Anubis respectively. The second season premiered on January 9, 2012, and the second season's last episode was on March 9, 2012. The third season started airing on January 3, 2013, and ended on April 11, 2013.

=== Dubs ===
- in Swedish as Huset Anubis on Nickelodeon (Sweden)
- in Danish as Huset Anubis on Nickelodeon (Denmark)
- in Spanish as La Casa de Anubis on Canal Once (Mexico)
- in Brazilian Portuguese as Mistério de Anubis on Nickelodeon (Brazil)

Other countries have dubbed the English adaptation of the series House of Anubis instead of Het Huis Anubis.

== Movies ==
There have been three movies, each with a stand-alone story, but with the same actors:

- Het Pad der 7 Zonden (The Path of the 7 Sins), is the first Anubis movie, released in theaters in December 2008.
- De Wraak van Arghus (The Revenge of Arghus), is the second Anubis movie, released in theaters in December 2009.
- De Terugkeer van Sibuna (The Return of Sibuna), is the third and last Anubis movie and debuted on Nickelodeon in October 2010. The movie aired almost one year after the series ended. It showed where the characters went after they moved out of the house and what they are doing. Despite airing only one year after the last episode, the third movie takes place three years after the series finale, roughly around the same time the spin-off takes place. Some characters from that series also make (non-speaking) cameo appearances.

== Books ==
The story of the series:

Released date	Title	Translation	Pages
30 November 2006	De geheime club van de oude Wilg	The secret club of the old Willow	250
23 May 2007	Het geheim van de Tombe	The Secret of the Tomb	244
10 December 2007	De geheimzinnige vloek	The mysterious curse	256
26 May 2008	De Uitverkorene	The Chosen one	255
12 December 2008	Het geheim van Winsbrugge-Hennegouwen	The secret of Winsbrugge-Hennegouwen	287
27 May 2009	De traan van Isis	The tear of Isis	243
27 December 2009	De vloek van Anchesenamon	The curse of Anchesenamon	265

The story of the movies:

Released date	Title	Translation	Pages
15 October 2008	Het pad der 7 Zonden	The Path of the 7 Sins	174
16 December 2009	De wraak van Arghus	The revenge of Arghus	176
16 December 2009	De wraak van Arghus (Limited Edition)	The revenge of Arghus (Limited Edition)	207

Additional books:

Released date	Title	Translation	Pages
1 October 2007	Het boek vol mysteries	The Book full of Mysteries	49
18 August 2008	Fanboek	Fanbook	16
19 October 2009	Hersenbreker	Brainteaser	25
3 February 2010	Spelletjesboek	Gamebook	48
