= Guy Lee Thys =

- Born: 20 October 1952 (age 73); Antwerp, Belgium
- Occupations: film director, film producer, screenwriter

Guy Lee Thys (born 20 October 1952) is a Belgian film producer, director, and screenwriter.

In 1981 Guy Lee Thys, whose nickname in the Belgian media is "enfant terrible of Flemish Cinema", established Skyline Films, renamed Fact & Fiction in 1992. The small production company produces moderate budget feature-length fiction and documentaries. Fact & Fiction is headquartered in Antwerp, Belgium.

== Works ==
- The Pencil Murders (aka De Potloodmoorden, 1982)
- Cruel Horizon (aka Boat People, 1989)
- Shades, as screenwriter and associate producer, starring Mickey Rourke, directed by Eric Van Looy (1999)
- Kassablanka (2002), a Romeo and Juliet story set in an Antwerp working class district where Muslims and white supremacists clash
- Suspect, emo-drama on phony incest victims, released in 2005
- The Box Collector (2008), as story writer and associate producer, directed by John Daly, shot in Winnipeg, Manitoba, Canada summer of 2007.
- Mixed Kebab (2012), the story about the gay relationship between a Turkish and Flemish guy.
