= Country Joy =

Canadian soap opera television series

- Genre: Soap opera
- Starring: Howard Dallin; Judith Mabey
- Country of origin: Canada
- Original language: English
- No. of seasons: 1

Production
- Producer: Mark Schoenburg
- Running time: 30 minutes

Original release
- Network: CBC Television
- Release: 19 November 1979 – 4 January 1980

Country Joy is a Canadian soap opera television series which aired on CBC Television from 1979 to 1980.

== Premise ==
This series was produced in Edmonton. Its plot features Dick Brugencate (Howard Dallin), a real estate agent in the fictitious Alberta community of Coronet, lost his wife in an automobile crash. He campaigns to build a modern medical centre for the community believing that this could have prevented his wife's death. In the process, he meets and soon marries medical executive Joy Burnham (Judith Maby). Dick's mother Helen (Vernis McQuaig) and his teenaged children Pam (Debra Au Coin) and Bob (Jim Calderbank) object to his relationship with Joy.

== Scheduling ==
This half-hour series was broadcast on weekdays at 12:30 p.m. (Eastern) from 19 November 1979 to 4 January 1980.

== Cast ==
- Howard Dallin as Dick Brugencate
- Judith Mabey as Joy Burnham
- Debra Au Coin as Pam Brugencate
- Jim Calderbank as Rob Brugencate
- Vernis McQuaig as Helen Brugencate
- Brian Taylor as Andy Mallory
- Wally McSween as John Morgan
- Pamela Boyd
- Jack Wyntars

== See also ==
- High Hopes (1978)
