= Mixed Kebab =

- Directed by: Guy Lee Thys
- Written by: Guy Lee Thys
- Starring: Cem Akkanat; Simon Van Buyten; Gamze Tazim; Karlijn Sileghem; Lukas De Wolf
- Cinematography: Björn Charpentier
- Edited by: Marc Wouters
- Music by: Michelino Bisceglia; Buscemi
- Release date: February 29, 2012
- Running time: 98 min
- Countries: Belgium; Turkey
- Languages: Dutch; Turkish; French; English; Arabic

Mixed Kebab is a Belgian drama film released in 2012. The film was written and directed by Guy Lee Thys. It stars Cem Akkanat and Simon Van Buyten.

== Synopsis ==
Ibrahim is a 27-year-old Muslim born in Belgium. He lives in a multicultural residential area with his parents. He is integrated in western society. That's why he prefers to be called Bram, a frequently used Belgian masculine name. Although his father was born in the Netherlands and his mother in Belgium, the family still sticks to many Turkish traditions.

Furkan, Bram's brother, frequently skips class. When he's confronted by his brother, Furkan blackmails him because he knows Bram frequently visits the gay nightlife. If Bram does not inform their parents about the skipping, Furkan will also hold his tongue. There are also rumors about Bram's sexual orientation in the Turkish pub. Bram's father refutes the gossips as his son is going to visit Turkey to meet his niece, Elif. Both parents have planned an arranged marriage.

In the meantime, Bram met Kevin, a 19-year-old Belgian boy who helps his mother in a bistro. Kevin's mother is almost sure her son is gay. She is also convinced Bram is attracted to Kevin. Bram visits the bistro quite often and can't keep his eyes off Kevin. That's why she encourages them to spend the evening together, but they merely become good friends.

When Bram is about to leave for Turkey, he also buys a ticket for Kevin to join him. In Turkey, Kevin doesn't hide his feelings any more and the two start a secret love affair. This is, however, noticed by one of the hotel clerks. The clerk is also in love with Elif, but is rejected since Elif knows she's going to move to Belgium. The hotel clerk is jealous and takes photos when Bram and Kevin are making love.

Bram meets Elif and prepares all the paperwork to get her a Belgian visa. The hotel clerk gives the photos to Elif. Although she is shocked, she decides to go to Belgium as she only hopes for a better life.

After a week, Bram and Kevin fly back to Belgium. Bram thinks Elif should stay in Turkey as women are more emancipated there than the Turkish women in Belgium.

Meanwhile, Furkan has become a member of an Islamic fundamentalist religious group. They want to introduce Sharia in Belgium and want shopkeepers only to sell halal. Furthermore, they take as many photos as possible of all kinds of police interventions in order to try to convince the Muslim population that the police are against them. Furkan's father is upset, as some members of the group have connections with Taliban and Osama bin Laden.

The rejected hotel clerk sends the photos to Belgium. Bram admits he is gay and in love with Kevin. He is not willing to marry Elif because both of them will be unhappy. Bram is then disowned by his family. But the word is spreading and soon the whole family is being shunned by the Muslim community.

Furkan wants his family's honor to be restored and he dreams of an honour killing in which he murders Kevin by cutting his throat. His action is approved by the fundamentalist group. Just before entering the bistro, Furkan is stabbed by a youth gang because he once beat up one of its members. However, Bram quickly intervenes and saves Furkan's life. Bram is reunited with his family in the hospital and Kevin walks away unharmed. The fate of their relationship remains uncertain at the end.
