= Sassy Pants =

- Theatrical release poster
- Directed by: Coley Sohn
- Written by: Coley Sohn
- Produced by: Pavlina Hatoupis; Adam Wilkins
- Starring: Anna Gunn; Ashley Rickards; Haley Joel Osment; Diedrich Bader; Jenny O'Hara
- Cinematography: Denis Maloney
- Edited by: Robin Katz; Kindra Marra
- Music by: Angela Correa
- Production companies: Ministry of Content; Sassy Pictures; Spruce Street Films; Urbanite
- Distributed by: Phase 4 Films
- Release dates: January 28, 2012 (SBIFF); October 19, 2012 (United States)
- Running time: 87 minutes
- Country: United States
- Language: English

Sassy Pants is a 2012 American comedy-drama film written and directed by Coley Sohn and starring Anna Gunn, Ashley Rickards, Haley Joel Osment, Diedrich Bader, and Jenny O'Hara. The film was released by Phase 4 Films on October 19, 2012.

== Cast ==
- Anna Gunn as June Pruitt, an overbearing mother who has been homeschooling children. She and her children are estranged, and she cannot admit to herself that she is the problem.
- Ashley Rickards as Bethany Pruitt, an 18-year girl who graduated from homeschooling. She wants to go away to college, but her mother wants to keep her home to control her.
- Haley Joel Osment as Chip Hardy, Bethany's father's boyfriend.
- Diedrich Bader as Dale Pinto, a divorced gay dad who has a great relationship with his kids. He owns a car lot.
- Jenny O'Hara as Grandma Pruitt, an overbearing mother who treats June the same way June treats Bethany.
- Martin Spanjers as Shayne Pruitt
- Shanna Collins as Brianna
- Aaron Perilo as Cory
- Rene Rosado as Hector
- Drew Droege as Michael Paul
- Jenna Kanell as Anna

== Reception ==
Sassy Pants received mixed reviews from critics. On Rotten Tomatoes, the film has a rating of 50%, based on 6 reviews, with an average rating of 5.5/10. On Metacritic, the film has a rating of 51 out of 100, based on 6 critics, indicating "mixed or average reviews".
