= Het Huis Anubis en de Vijf van het Magische Zwaard =

Het Huis Anubis en de Vijf van Het Magische zwaard (meaning The House of Anubis and the Five of the Magical Sword) is a Dutch / Flemish mystery series in which five people, each born with an oversensitive sense, have to fight against Dark Druids who want to steal their senses for their own purposes. The House of Anubis and the Five of the Magical Sword has aired since 17 March 2010 and was broadcast on Nickelodeon. The last episode aired in 2011. There will not be a third season. The program is produced in association with Studio 100.

The series is a sequel / spin-off to Het Huis Anubis, which ended a year earlier. No traces of the last residents and the cast of the original series are in the new series, although this new cast did make a cameo appearance in the last Anubis film. The movie, called: De terugkeer van Sibuna (meaning The Return of Sibuna), is about Nienke (Nina) and the rest of the club (Fabian, Jeroen (Jerome) and Amber) trying to save Appie (Alfie) from a German clan, who want to curse him to make themselves the rulers of the world.

The only character to appear in both the original and this spin-off is Victor. He appears in the teaser for first episode, where he's seen selling the House to Kai and Arlène.

== Plot ==
=== Season 1 ===
Five teenagers are invited to the House of Anubis. Each one of them has their own hypersensitive sense that they have to suppress to be able to live like normal teenagers. According to Merlin's prophecy, they have to develop their senses and work together to unravel the mystery of the Dark Druids, and ultimately, defeat them to protect the Magical Sword - which is, indeed, the legendary Excalibur.

Sterre, Anastacia, Pim, Raphael and Marcel live together under the leadership of the mysterious landlords Arléne and Kai. The teens do not know about the existence of Kai because he hides himself, and spies on the teens by use of cameras. Arléne knows this and is very nice to the kids so they feel at home. The truth, however, is that Kai and Arléne are Dark Druids who want to use the senses the children have to revive Ewan, Kai's brother. One of the girls, Sterre, also starts hearing voices and seeing a girl. But what does this girl want? Will she warn Sterre for Arléne and Kai?

=== Season 2 ===
With the Dark Druids gone, the Five should be safe. But nothing is as it seems... There is another danger the Five doesn't know about: the evil enchantress Morgana le Fay wants to get her hands on the sword of King Arthur. Merlin warns the Five: their senses must come back and they have to learn to control their powers, because only the Five, all together, can defeat Morgana. But Morgana has a helper, Thomas, who moved into the house with his mother. Morgana orders him to separate the Five so that they will never unite to fight against Morgana. Morgana says that he must prevent that the Five get their sense back.

And Morgana's plans works. Anastacia falls in love with Thomas and Thomas knows a way to get them all angry at each other. He has a bracelet that gives him the power to shapeshift. He turns himself into Raphael and tells Sterre that he doesn't like her anymore. But when Sterre tells the real Raphael, he thinks she made it up to be with Pim. Pim is in love with Sterre, but also meets Cato, the new principal's daughter, who falls in love with him. Sterre likes Pim now, but Thomas shapeshifts into Pim, telling her that he likes Cato. Sterre gets angry at the real Pim, but he doesn't remember anything. In the meantime Anastacia is trying to become lead singer in the school band, but she can't sing. She also has concurration; Hester, the sister of Cato. Will it all work out?
