= Blake Young-Fountain =

American actor and producer (born 1981)

- Born: September 13, 1981 (age 45); Cleveland, Ohio, United States
- Education: New York University Tisch School
- Occupations: Actor and Producer
- Years active: 1991–present

Blake Young-Fountain (born September 13, 1981) is an American actor and producer. He's known for his roles in Grownish, The Mindy Project and The Skinny (2012).

== Early life ==
Young-Fountain grew up in both St. Louis, Missouri, and Norwalk, Connecticut; his parents worked in the fashion industry. His mother was a fan of the soap opera Dynasty and named him after her favorite character - Blake Carrington. He studied at New York University Tisch School, graduating with double majors in both Drama (BA) and Journalism (BA).

== Filmography ==
- America's Most Wanted: America Fights Back (1988), Rashawn Brazell
- The Houseboy (2007), Blake
- Blueprint (2007), Keith
- Perception (2009), Interviewer
- Chasing The Green (2009), Carl
- The Real Deal (2009), D'Vaughn Murray
- 2 Broke Girls (2011) (TV Series), Bro#2, "And the 90's Horse Party" episode
- Parenthood (2011) (TV Series), Arnie/Bradely's Friend#2; 'Amazing Andy and His Wonderful World of Bugs' and 'Damage Control' (2 episodes)
- The Skinny (2012), Sebastian
- Let Clay Be Clay (2013), Young Cassius
- The Mindy Project (2013) (TV Series), Singing Waiter; "Mindy's Birthday" episode
- Filthy Sexy Teen$ (2013) (TV Movie), Shoemaker
- Michael (2015), Chris
- Griot's Lament (2014), Salb, "Griot's Lament Webisode III"
- Purple Dots (2016), Producer
- Falling For Angels (2017), Terick, "Leimert Park" episode
- Grownish (2018), Jerome, "Erase Your Social"; "Starboy" episodes
- Marlon (2018), Dustin, "Homecoming" episode
- Dear White People, (2018), Man, "Volume II: Chapter VIII" episode
- Pet Peeves, (2018), Brandon,
- SK & J, (2018), George Michael, "First Pitch" episode
- Now What (2019), Daryl, "Counter Clockwise" episode

== Production ==
- Griot's Lament (2014), Associate Producer
- Purple Dots (2016), Producer
- Make the Moon Trailer (2017), Producer, Costume Designer
