= Gamze Tazim =

Turkish-Dutch actress

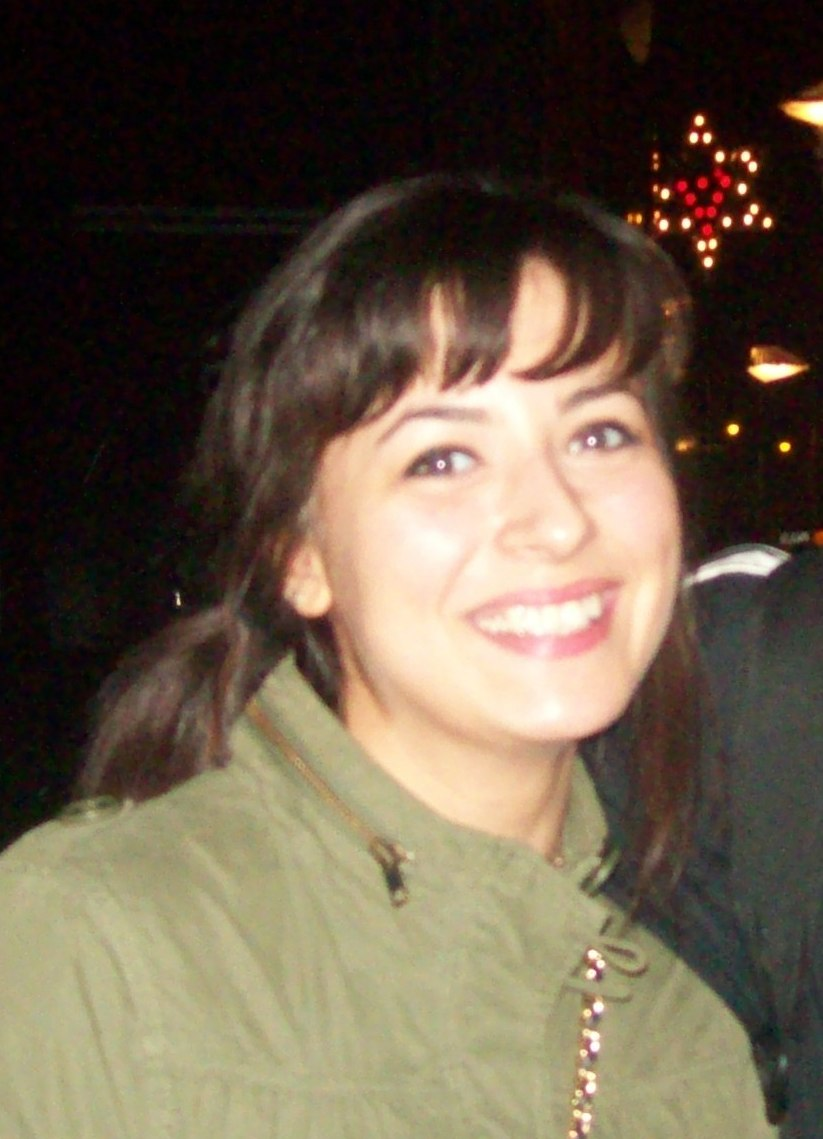
- Born: 28 January 1989 (age 37); The Hague, South Holland, Netherlands
- Years active: 2008–present

Gamze Tazim (born 28 January 1989) is a Turkish-Dutch actress.

== Filmography ==
=== Film ===
Film
Year	Film	Role	Notes
2011	Mixed Kebab	Elif	
2010	Gangsterboys	Serpil	
2009	Anubis en de wraak van Arghus	Noa van Rijn	
2008	Anubis: Het pad der 7 zonden	Noa van Rijn	

=== Television ===
Year	Film	Role	Notes
2007–09	Het Huis Anubis	Noa van Rijn	Replaced Liliana de Vries who played Mara Sabri
2009	Den Helder	Ayla	
