= Chantal Thomas =

French writer and historian

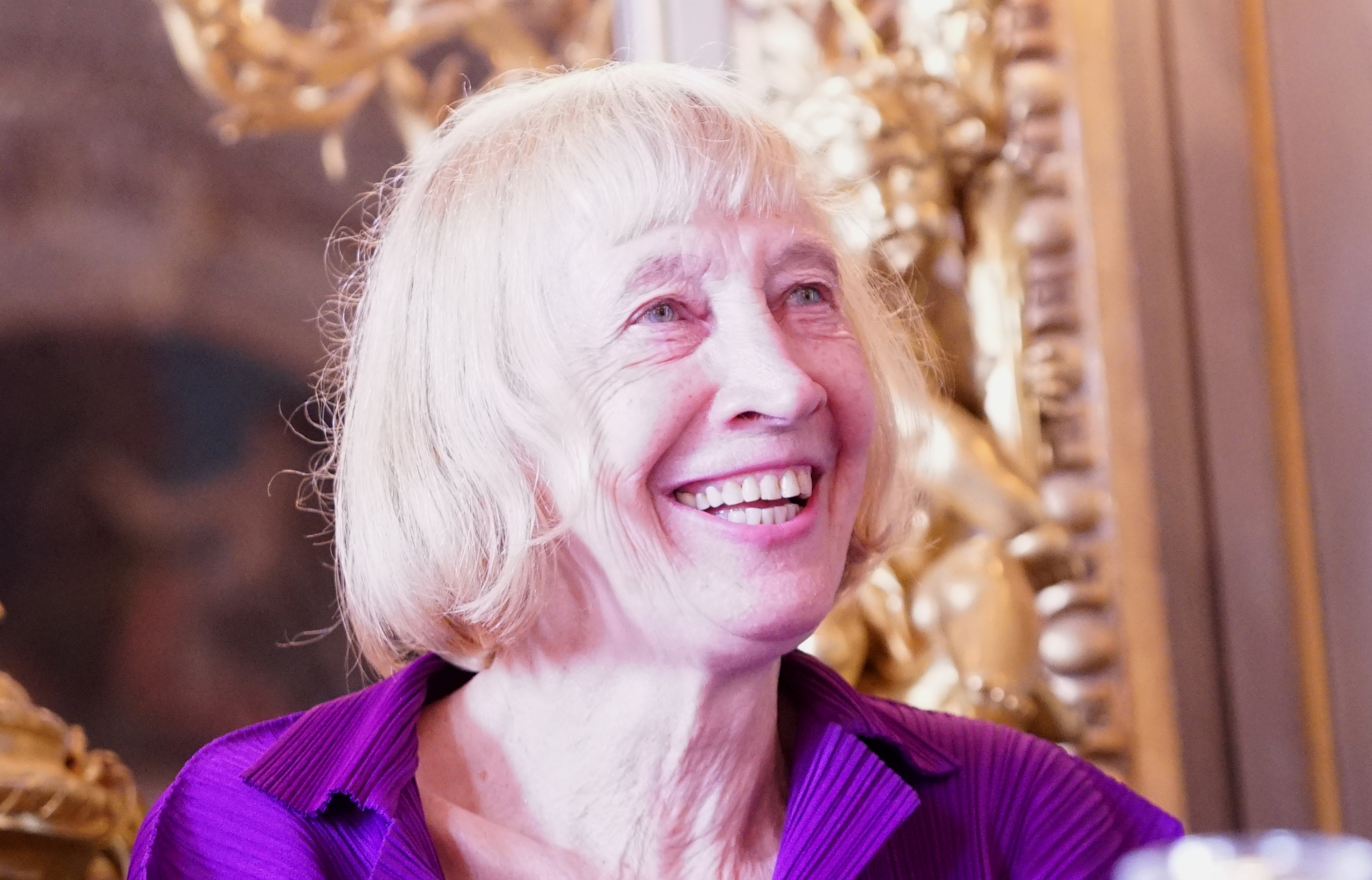
- "Le Livre sur la Place" in 2019
- Born: 18 October 1945 (age 81); Lyon, France
- Writing career
- Language: French
- Genres: European history Historical fiction
- Notable works: Les adieux à la reine Le Testament d'Olympe; L'esprit de conversation
- Notable awards: Prix Femina

Chantal Thomas (French pronunciation: [ʃɑ̃tal tɔma]; born 18 October 1945) is a French writer and historian. Her 2002 book, Farewell, My Queen, won the Prix Femina and was adapted into a 2012 film starring Diane Kruger and Léa Seydoux.

== Career ==
Thomas was born in Lyon in 1945 and was raised in Arcachon, Bordeaux, and Paris. Her life has included teaching jobs at American and French universities (such as Yale and Princeton) as well as a publishing career. She has published nineteen works, including essays on the Marquis de Sade, Casanova, and Marie Antoinette.

In 2002, Thomas published Les adieux à la reine (Farewell, My Queen). The novel gives a fictional account of the final days of Marie Antoinette in power through the perspective of one of her servants. It won the Prix Femina in 2002, and was later adapted into the 2012 film Farewell, My Queen. The film stars Diane Kruger as the titular queen and Léa Seydoux as her servant Sidonie Laborde. Thomas co-wrote the screenplay, and it opened the 62nd Berlin International Film Festival. Helen Falconer of The Guardian called the work "a well written slice of history" with "evocative, observant prose," but criticized it for creating a narrator who "merely provides us with a pair of eyes to see through rather than capturing our interest in her own right." While disagreeing with its classification as a novel, Falconer did however add that Farewell, My Queen "generates in the reader a real sense of being a fly on the wall, eavesdropping on the affairs of the great and the not-so-good."

Thomas is currently the director of research at the French National Centre for Scientific Research.

She was elected a member of the Académie française (seat number 12) on 28 January 2021.

== Honors ==
- Knight of the Legion of Honour (France, 2024).
- Officier of the National Order of Merit (France, 2016).
- Commander of the Ordre des Arts et des Lettres (France, 2021).
- Knight of the Order of Cultural Merit (Monaco, 2023).

== Works ==
- Sade, L'œil de la lettre (1978)
- Casanova, Un voyage libertin (1985)
- Don Juan ou Pavlov, Essai sur la communication publicitaire (1991)
- La Reine scélérate, Marie-Antoinette dans les pamphlets (1989)
  translated into English as The Wicked Queen : The Origins of the Myth of Marie-Antoinette (1999) by Julie Rose
- Thomas Bernhard (1990)
- Sade (1994)
- La Vie réelle des petites filles (1995)
- Comment supporter sa liberté (1998)
  translated into English as Coping with freedom : reflections on ephemeral happiness (2001), by Andrea L. Secara
- Les Adieux à la Reine (2002)
  translated into English as Farewell, My Queen (2003), by Moishe Black
- La Lectrice-Adjointe (2003)
- Souffrir (2003)
- L'île flottante (2004)
- Apolline ou L'école de la Providence (2005)
- Le Palais de la reine (2005)
- Chemins de sable, Conversation avec Claude Plettner (2006)
- Jardinière Arlequin, Conversations avec Alain Passard (2006)
- Cafés de la mémoire (2008)
- Le Testament d'Olympe (2010)
- L'esprit de conversation (2011)
- L'Échange des princesses (2013)
  translated into English as The Exchange of Princesses (2014), by John Cullen
- Un air de liberté. Variations sur l'esprit du XVIIIe siècle (2014)
- Souvenirs de la marée basse (2017)
  translated into English as Memories of Low Tide (2019), by Natasha Lehrer
- East Village Blues (2019)
- Café Vivre. chroniques en passant (2020)
- Journal de nage (2022)
