= Coley Sohn =

American filmmaker

Coley Sohn is an American screenwriter, director, and actor. She was born and raised in Washington DC and graduated from Winston Churchill High School in Potomac, MD, in 1987. During her childhood, she was part of the cast for the 1980 Broadway revival of The Music Man and also acted at Ford's Theatre and in a national tour. She graduated Magna cum laude from the University of Vermont with a major in English and minors in Theater and Film. Immediately after her university education Sohn relocated to Los Angeles and began acting. In 2009 her short film Boutonniere premiered at the Sundance Film Festival. Her debut feature film Sassy Pants was released in 2012. Most recently, she wrote, directed, produced and acted in her second feature film Mud Key which was acquired by Freestyle Digital Media and released in October 2024.

== Filmography ==
- Boutonniere (2009)
- Sassy Pants (2012)
