= Maple Avenue (TV series) =

- Country of origin: Germany
- No. of episodes: 42 (60 produced)

Original release
- Network: RTL
- Release: 16 April – 15 June 2007

Maple Avenue (In German: Ahornallee) was a German soap opera television series which ran between April and June 2007 on RTL. The series focused on a woman after the death of the father of her two children, who, plagued by financial worries, moves to the big city of Düsseldorf to start a new life. The series was discontinued due to low ratings.

== See also ==
- List of German television series
