= 1867 =

1867 in various calendars
- Gregorian calendar: 1867; MDCCCLXVII
- Ab urbe condita: 2620
- Armenian calendar: 1316; ԹՎ ՌՅԺԶ
- Assyrian calendar: 6617
- Baháʼí calendar: 23–24
- Balinese saka calendar: 1788–1789
- Bengali calendar: 1273–1274
- Berber calendar: 2817
- British Regnal year: 30 Vict. 1 – 31 Vict. 1
- Buddhist calendar: 2411
- Burmese calendar: 1229
- Byzantine calendar: 7375–7376
- Chinese calendar: 丙寅年 (Fire Tiger); 4564 or 4357 — to — 丁卯年 (Fire Rabbit); 4565 or 4358
- Coptic calendar: 1583–1584
- Discordian calendar: 3033
- Ethiopian calendar: 1859–1860
- Hebrew calendar: 5627–5628
- Hindu calendars
- Vikram Samvat: 1923–1924
- Shaka Samvat: 1788–1789
- Kali Yuga: 4967–4968
- Holocene calendar: 11867
- Igbo calendar: 867–868
- Iranian calendar: 1245–1246
- Islamic calendar: 1283–1284
- Japanese calendar: Keiō 3 (慶応３年)
- Javanese calendar: 1795–1796
- Julian calendar: Gregorian minus 12 days
- Korean calendar: 4200
- Minguo calendar: 45 before ROC 民前45年
- Nanakshahi calendar: 399
- Thai solar calendar: 2409–2410
- Tibetan calendar: མེ་ཕོ་སྟག་ལོ་ (male Fire-Tiger); 1993 or 1612 or 840 — to — མེ་མོ་ཡོས་ལོ་ (female Fire-Hare); 1994 or 1613 or 841

1867 (MDCCCLXVII) was a common year starting on Tuesday of the Gregorian calendar and a common year starting on Sunday of the Julian calendar, the 1867th year of the Common Era (CE) and Anno Domini (AD) designations, the 867th year of the 2nd millennium, the 67th year of the 19th century, and the 8th year of the 1860s decade. As of the start of 1867, the Gregorian calendar was 12 days ahead of the Julian calendar, which remained in localized use until 1923.

There were only 354 days this year in the newly purchased territory of Alaska. When the territory transferred from the Russian Empire to the United States, the calendric transition from the Julian to the Gregorian Calendar was made with only 11 days instead of 12 during the 19th century. This change was made due to the territorial and geopolitical shift from the Asian to the American side of the International Date Line. Friday, 6 October 1867 (Julian Calendar) was followed by Friday again on 18 October 1867 (instead of Saturday, 19 October 1867 in the Gregorian Calendar).

== Events ==
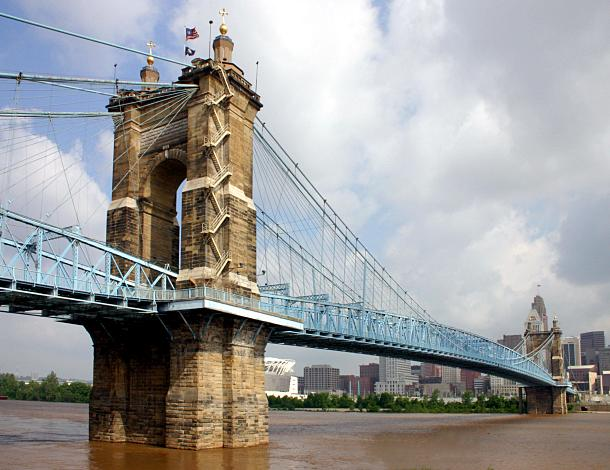
January 1: Roebling's is the longest suspension bridge.

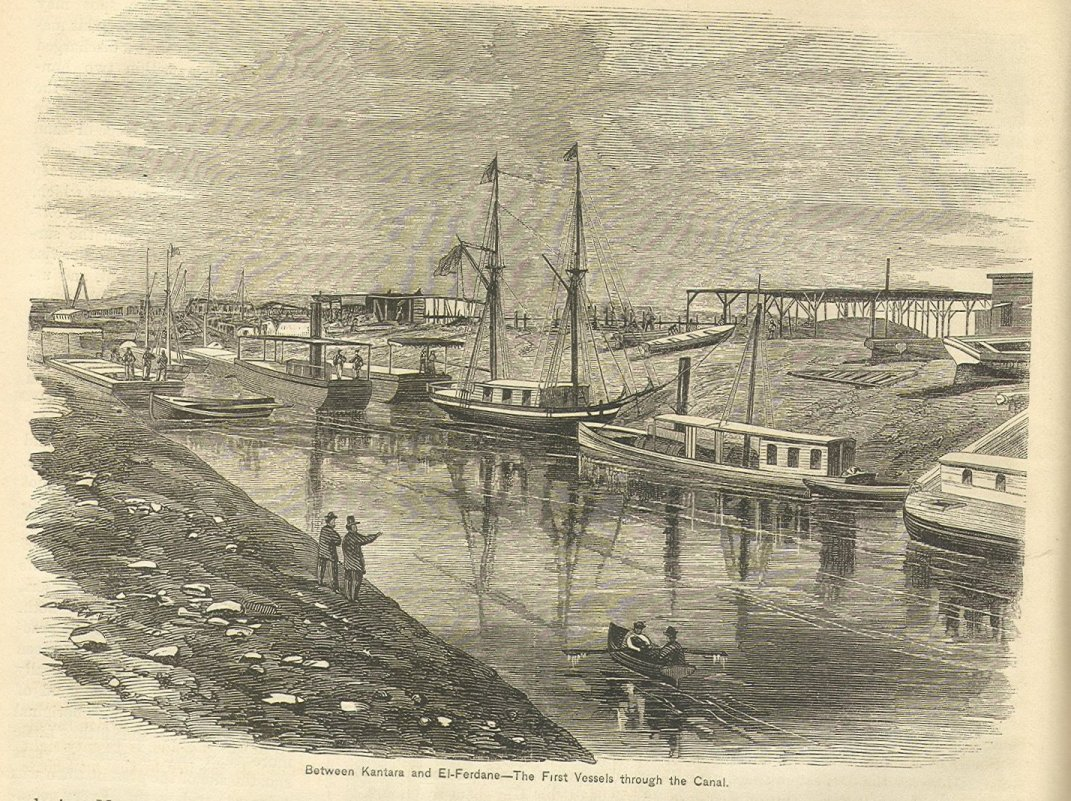
February 17: Suez Canal in use.

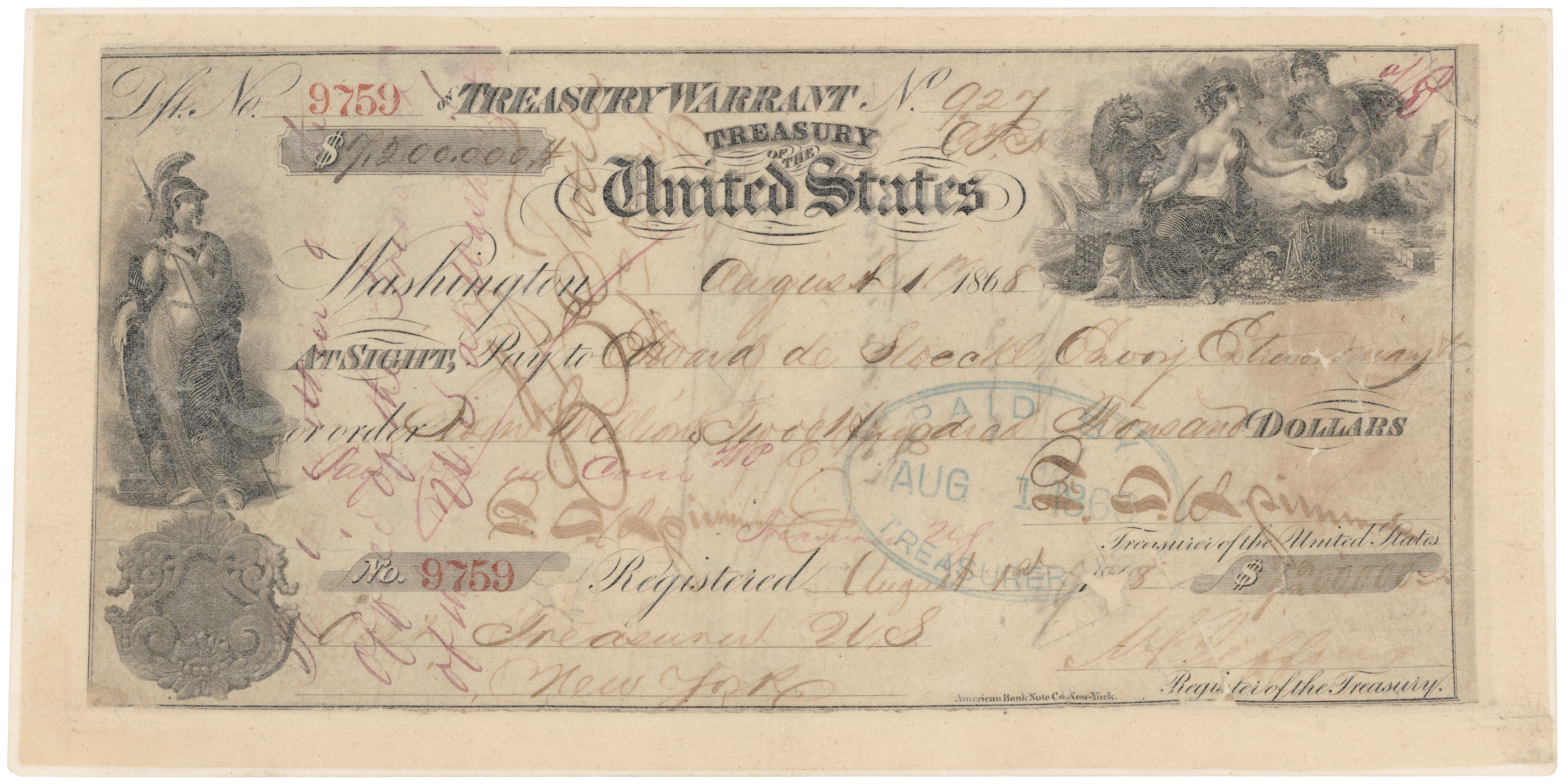
March 30: Alaska bought by check.

=== January ===
- January 1 – The Covington–Cincinnati Suspension Bridge opens between Cincinnati, Ohio, and Covington, Kentucky, in the United States, becoming the longest single-span bridge in the world. It is renamed after its designer, John A. Roebling, in 1983.
- January 8 – African-American men are granted the right to vote in the District of Columbia.
- January 11 – Benito Juárez becomes Mexican president again.
- January 15 – Regent's Park skating disaster in London: 40 people die when ice on a lake breaks.
- January 30 – Emperor Kōmei of Japan dies suddenly, age 36, leaving his son Mutsuhito to succeed him.
- January 31 – Maronite nationalist leader Youssef Bey Karam leaves Lebanon aboard a French ship for Algeria.

=== February ===
- February 3 – The late Emperor Kōmei's 14-year-old son, Prince Mutsuhito, becomes Emperor Meiji of Japan in a brief ceremony in Kyoto, ending the Late Tokugawa shogunate.
- February 7 – West Virginia University is established in Morgantown.
- February 13 – The Covering of the Senne in Brussels begins.
- February 14 – Augusta Institute is founded in Augusta, Georgia, later known as Morehouse College.
- February 15 – Johann Strauss II's waltz The Blue Danube (An der schönen blauen Donau) is first performed, at a concert of the Vienna Men's Choral Association. Later this year, Strauss will adapt it into its popular purely orchestral version for the Exposition Universelle in Paris.
- February 19 – Battle of Inlon River: The Qing dynasty defeats the Nien rebels in Hubei, China.
- February 22 – The Indiana Daily Student is established at Indiana University in Bloomington.
- February 28 – The United States Congress forbids taxpayer funding of diplomatic envoys to the Holy See (Vatican), begun in 1848, and breaks off relations. Funding resumes, along with relations, in 1984.

=== March ===
- March 1 – Nebraska is admitted as the 37th U.S. state.
- March 5 – The Fenian Rising breaks out in Ireland.
- March 16 – An article by Joseph Lister outlining his use of antiseptic surgery is first published in The Lancet.
- March 23 – William III of the Netherlands accepts an offer of 5,000,000 guilders from Napoleon III for the sale of Luxembourg, leading to the Luxembourg Crisis.
- March 29 – The British North America Act receives royal assent, forming the Dominion of Canada, in an event known as the Confederation. This unites the Province of Canada (Quebec and Ontario), New Brunswick, and Nova Scotia on July 1. Ottawa will become the capital.
- March 30 – Alaska Purchase: Alaska is purchased for US$7.2 million from Alexander II of Russia, about 2 cents/acre ($4.19/km^{2}), by United States Secretary of State William H. Seward. Newspapers call this Seward's Folly.
- March – The University of Illinois Urbana-Champaign is established (opened one year later).

=== April ===
- April 1 – The Strait Settlement of Singapore, formerly ruled from Calcutta, becomes a Crown colony, under the jurisdiction of the Colonial Office in London.
- April 1–November 3 – Exposition Universelle, an international exhibition in Paris. Among the visitors is Abdülaziz, making the first visit of a Sultan of the Ottoman Empire to Western Europe.
- April 28 – I.C. Sorosis, the first women's fraternity (sorority) founded upon the men's fraternity model, with Pi Beta Phi as its motto, is founded at Monmouth College in Monmouth, Illinois. In 1888, the motto becomes the name of the organization.

=== May ===
- May 1 – The first political May Day march takes place in Chicago.
- May 7 – Alfred Nobel patents dynamite in the United Kingdom.
- May 11
  - Treaty of London: The great powers of Europe reaffirm the neutrality of Luxembourg, ending the Luxembourg Crisis. The Duchy of Limburg is formally re-incorporated into the Kingdom of the Netherlands.
  - Cox and Box, by Francis Burnand and Arthur Sullivan, is first publicly performed, at the Adelphi Theatre, London.
- May 24 – Robert William Keate becomes Lieutenant-governor of the Colony of Natal.
- May 29
  - The Austro-Hungarian Compromise (called Ausgleich in German or kiegyezés in Hungarian (The Compromise)) is born through Act 12, which establishes the Austro-Hungarian Empire; on June 8 Emperor Franz Joseph I of Austria is crowned King of Hungary.
  - Canadian Confederation: Queen Victoria signs the British North America Act, creating the Dominion of Canada, effective July 1.

=== June ===
- June 15 – The Atlantic Cable Quartz Lode gold mine is named in Montana.

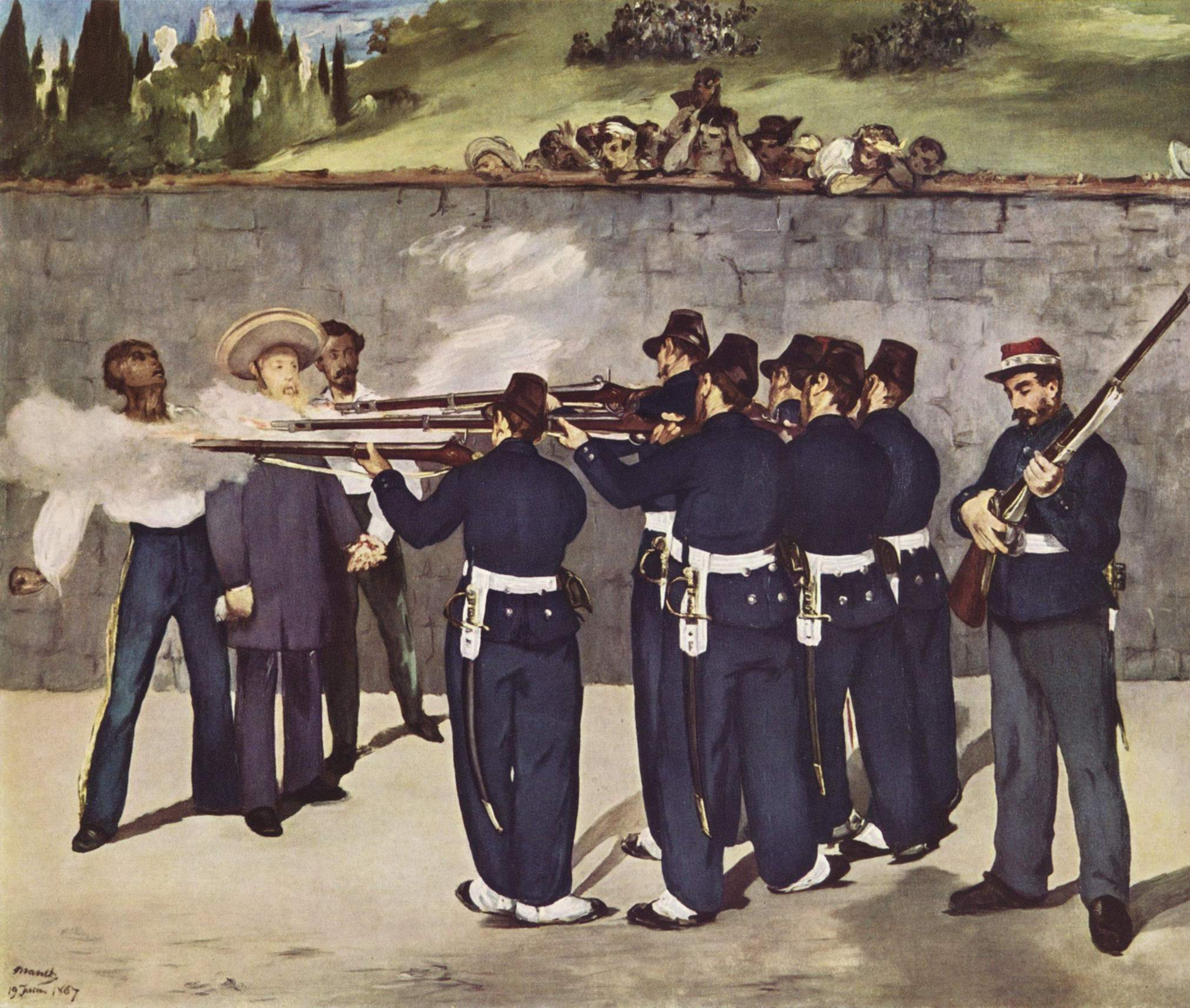
Édouard Manet's Execution of Emperor Maximilian (1868–1869), is one of five versions of his representation of the execution of the Austrian-born Emperor of Mexico, which took place on June 19, 1867. Manet borrowed heavily, thematically and technically, from Goya's The Third of May 1808.

- June 19 – A firing squad executes Emperor Maximilian I of Mexico and two of his lieutenants.
- June 20 – The first recorded association football match in Argentina takes place in Buenos Aires.

=== July ===
- July 1
  - Canadian Confederation: The British North America Act of 29 March comes into force, creating the Dominion of Canada, the first independent dominion in the British Empire.
  - The Constitution of the North German Confederation comes into effect, creating a confederation of states, under the leadership of Prussia and Otto von Bismarck.
- July 9 – Queen's Park F.C., the oldest association football league team in Scotland, is founded.
- July 15 – France declares Cambodia's independence from Siam; Cambodia becomes a protectorate of France and Britain.
- July 17 – In Boston, Massachusetts, the Harvard School of Dental Medicine is established as the first dental school in the United States.
- July 18 – The Battle of Fandane-Thiouthioune: The Serer people defeat the Muslim Marabouts of Senegambia.
- July – The Reverend Thomas Baker, a Wesleyan Methodist missionary (born in Playden, East Sussex, England) is cooked and eaten by Navatusila tribespeople at Nabutautau, Fiji, together with eight of his local followers, the only missionary in that country to suffer cannibalism.

=== August ===
- August 7–September 20 – The first Canadian election sees John A. Macdonald's Conservatives elected to government and Macdonald becomes the Dominion's first prime minister.
- August 15 – Benjamin Disraeli's Second Reform Act enfranchises many men in cities for the first time, and adds 938,000 to an electorate of 1,057,000 in England and Wales.

=== September ===
- September 2 – Emperor Meiji of Japan marries Empress Shōken (née Masako Ichijō). The Empress consort is thereafter known as Lady Haruko.
- September 4 – The Sheffield Wednesday F.C. is founded, at the Adelphi Hotel in Sheffield.
- September 14 – The first volume of Das Kapital (later translated into English as Capital) is published by Karl Marx.
- September 30 – The United States takes control of Midway Island.

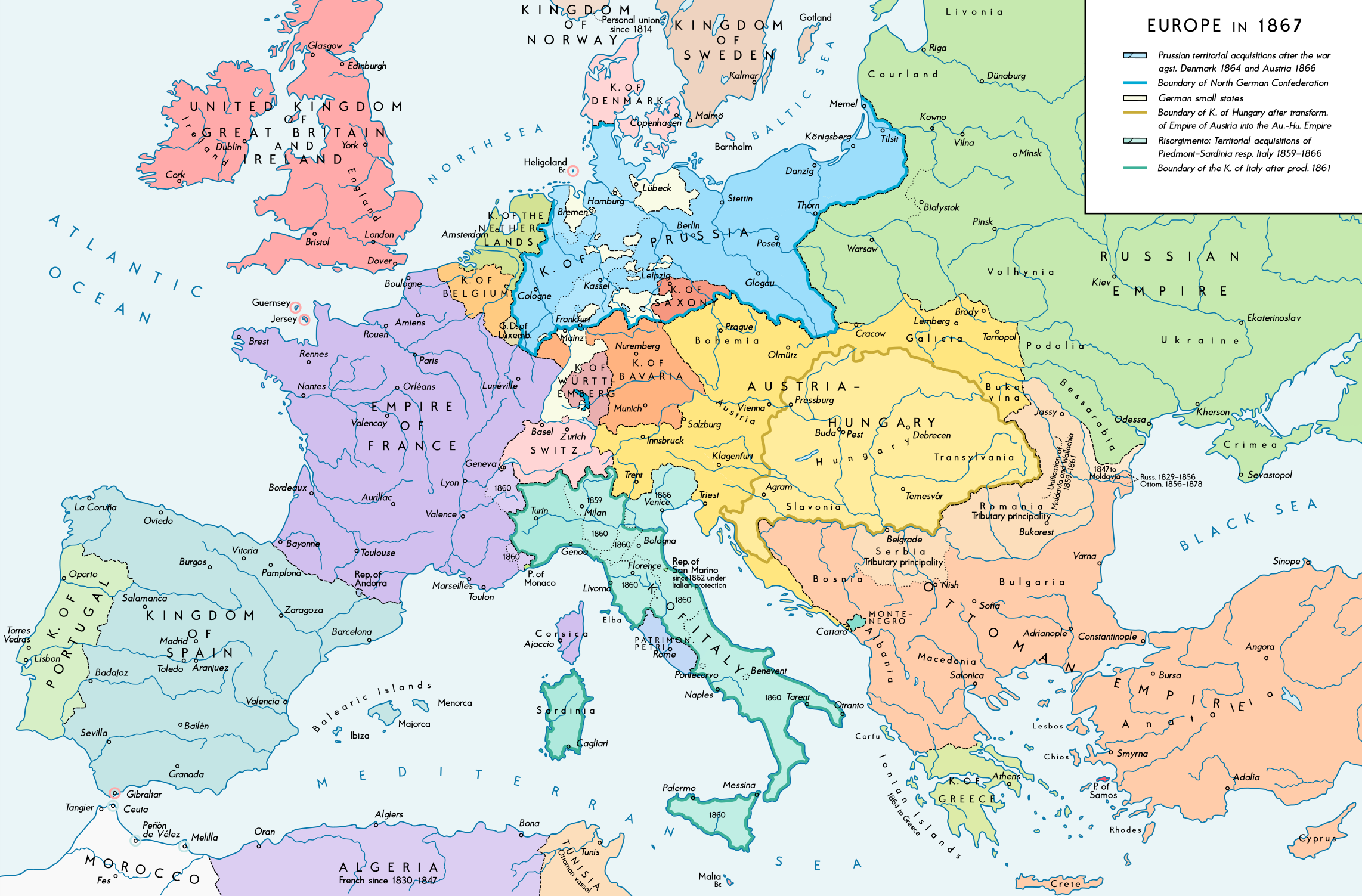
Europe in 1867, after the forming of the North German Confederation, the Italian unification (with the exception of the Roman part of the Papal States) and the Austro-Hungarian Compromise.

=== October ===
- October 12 – End of penal transportation from Britain as the last convict ship, the Hougoumont, departs from Portsmouth on an 89-day passage to Western Australia. 62 Fenians are among the transportees.
- October 18 – Alaska is transferred from Russia to the United States, becoming the Department of Alaska.
- October 21 – 'Manifest destiny': Medicine Lodge Treaty – Near Medicine Lodge Creek, Kansas, a landmark treaty is signed by southern Great Plains Indian leaders, requiring Native American Plains tribes to relocate to a reservation in western Oklahoma.
- October 27 – Italian unification: Giuseppe Garibaldi's troops march into the Papal States.

=== November ===
- November 2 – The first issue of the women's fashion magazine Harper's Bazaar is published. It is issued weekly, but later monthly.
- November 9 – The last shōgun of Japan, Tokugawa Yoshinobu, tenders his resignation to Emperor Meiji.
- November 21 – American temperance crusader Carrie Nation marries Charles Gloyd.
- November 23 – The three 'Manchester Martyrs' are hanged in England for the murder of a policeman whilst attempting to rescue two Irish Republican Brotherhood members from imprisonment on 18 September.

=== December ===
- December 2 – In a New York City theater, English author Charles Dickens gives his first public reading in the United States.
- December 4 – Beginning of British expedition to Abyssinia.
- December 13 – The Clerkenwell explosion, the most infamous action carried out by the Fenians in Britain in the 19th century.
- December 18 – Angola Horror (Buffalo, New York-area train wreck): The fiery death of 49 people leads John D. Rockefeller to develop and sell his Mineral Seal 300 °F (149 °C) Fire-Tested Burning Oil, and George Westinghouse to invent the railway air brake, which is mandated in the United States in 1893.

=== Date unknown ===
- Pierre Michaux invents the front wheel-driven velocipede, the first mass-produced bicycle.
- South African diamond fields are discovered.
- The Prohibition National Committee is formed in the United States.
- Clarke School for the Deaf in Western Massachusetts opens its doors for the first time, becoming the first school for the deaf in the United States to teach its children how to communicate using the oral method.
- At Fountain Point, Michigan, an artesian water spring, begins to gush continuously.
- The modern rose is born, with the introduction of Rosa 'La France' by Jean-Baptiste André Guillot.
- Gorse is naturalised in New Zealand, where it soon becomes the worst invasive weed.
- The Swedish famine of 1867–1869 begins.
- Yellow fever kills 3,093 in New Orleans.
- The Wasps Rugby Football Club is formed in Middlesex, England.
- Margarine Unie, at the time named Antoon Jurgens United, a predecessor of the Unilever, worldwide toiletries, beauty care and beverage brand, is founded in Netherlands.
- Delhaize, as predecessor for Ahold Delhaize, a major retail group in Europe, is founded in Belgium.
- The board game Parcheesi is introduced in the United States.
- The three western provinces of Lower Cochinchina (Vĩnh Long, An Giang, and Hà Tiên) are annexed into the colony of French Cochinchina.

=== Ongoing ===
- Paraguayan War.
- 1867–1873 – Chinese, Scandinavian and Irish immigrants lay 30,000 miles (48,000 km) of railroad tracks in the United States.

== Births ==
=== January–February ===
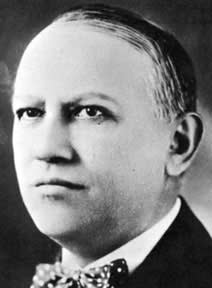
Carl Laemmle

- January 5 – Dimitrios Gounaris, 94th Prime Minister of Greece (d. 1922)
- January 6 – Takejirō Tokonami, Japanese politician, Home Minister, Railway Minister and Minister of Communication (d. 1935)
- January 8
  - Emily Greene Balch, American writer, pacifist, recipient of the Nobel Peace Prize (d. 1961)
  - Thomas Coward, English ornithologist (d. 1933)
- January 17
  - Jacob Christiaan Koningsberger, Dutch biologist and politician (d. 1951)
  - Carl Laemmle, German-born film executive (d. 1939)
- January 18 – Rubén Darío, Nicaraguan poet (d. 1916)
- January 20 – Yvette Guilbert, French singer, actress (d. 1944)
- January 21
  - James Marcus, American actor (d. 1937)
  - Maxime Weygand, French general (d. 1965)
- January 29 – Carl L. Boeckmann, Norwegian-American artist (d. 1923)
- February 4 – Alexander Godley, British general (d. 1957)
- February 7 – Laura Elizabeth Wilder, née Ingalls, American children's author (d. 1957)
- February 8 – William Michael Crose, United States Navy Commander and the seventh Naval Governor of American Samoa (d. 1929)
- February 10 – Charles W. Bryan, American politician (d. 1945)
- February 21 – Otto Hermann Kahn, German-born American millionaire, philanthropist (d. 1934)
- February 27 – Irving Fisher, American economist (d. 1947)

=== March–April ===
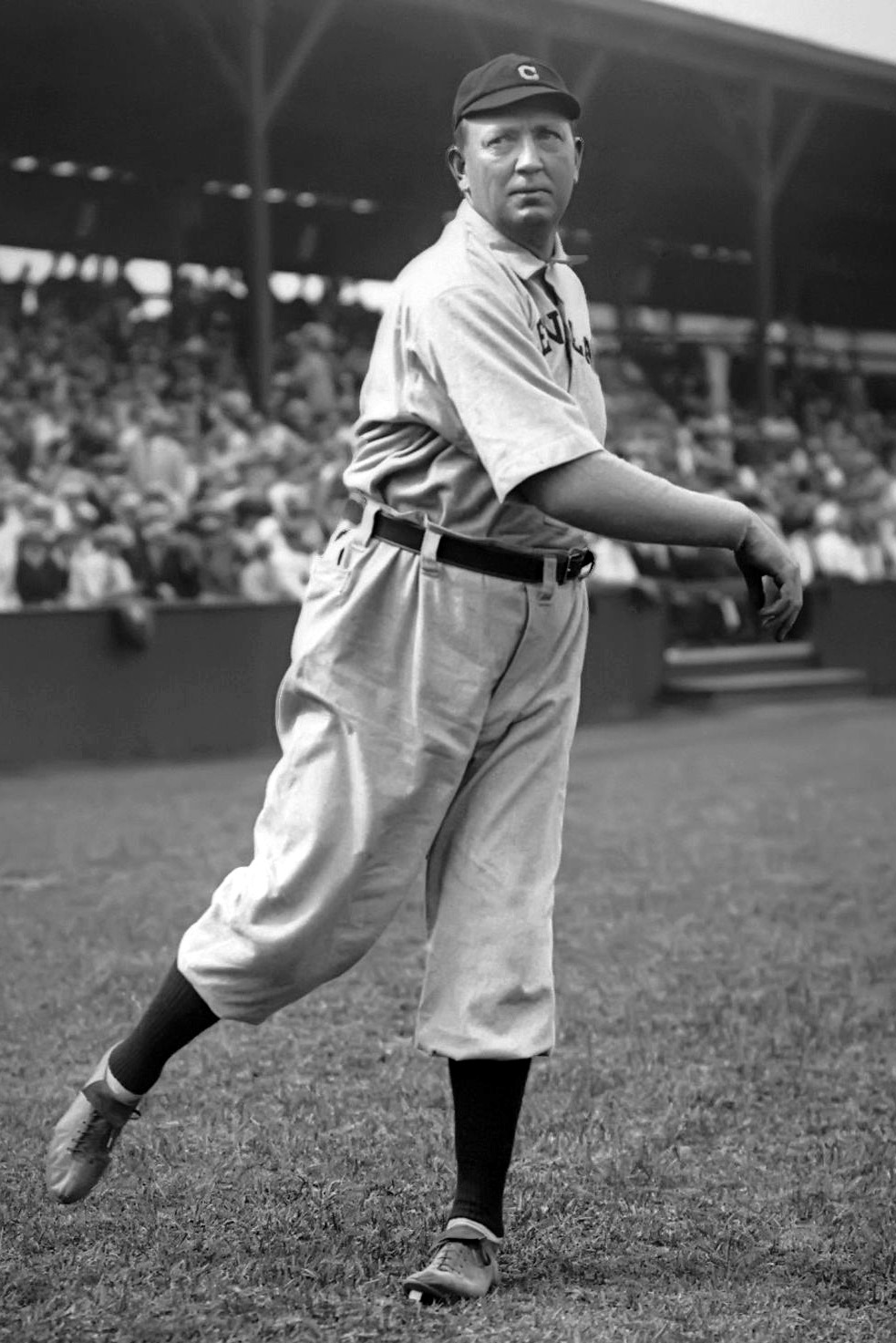
Cy Young

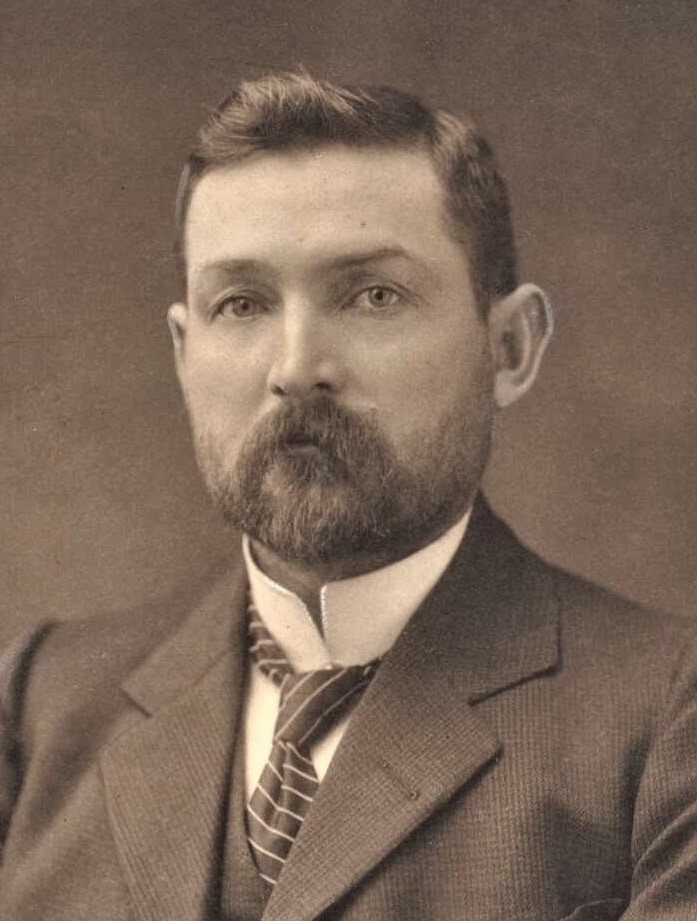
Chris Watson

- March 4 – Charles Pelot Summerall, American general (d. 1955)
- March 6 – Samuel Franklin Cody, American aviation pioneer (d. 1913)
- March 18 – Louis R. de Steiguer, American admiral (d. 1947)
- March 19 – Sakichi Toyoda, Japanese inventor, industrialist (d. 1930)
- March 21 – Florenz Ziegfeld Jr., American theatrical producer (d. 1932)
- March 25
  - Arturo Toscanini, Italian conductor (d. 1957)
  - Gutzon Borglum, American artist and sculptor (Mount Rushmore) (d. 1941)
- March 26 – Arnold Theiler, founder of the Onderstepoort Veterinary Research Institute in South Africa (d. 1936)
- March 29 – Cy Young, American baseball player (d. 1955)
- April 2 – Eugen Sandow, German-born body builder, circus performer (d. 1925)
- April 7 – Holger Pedersen, Danish linguist (d. 1953)
- April 9 – Chris Watson, 3rd Prime Minister of Australia (d. 1941)
- April 10 – George William Russell, Irish nationalist, poet and artist (d. 1935)
- April 13 – Sammy Woods, English cricketer (d. 1931)
- April 16 – Wilbur Wright, American aviation pioneer, co-inventor of the airplane with brother Orville (d. 1912)
- April 23 – Johannes Fibiger, Danish scientist, recipient of the Nobel Prize in Physiology or Medicine (d. 1928)

=== May–June ===
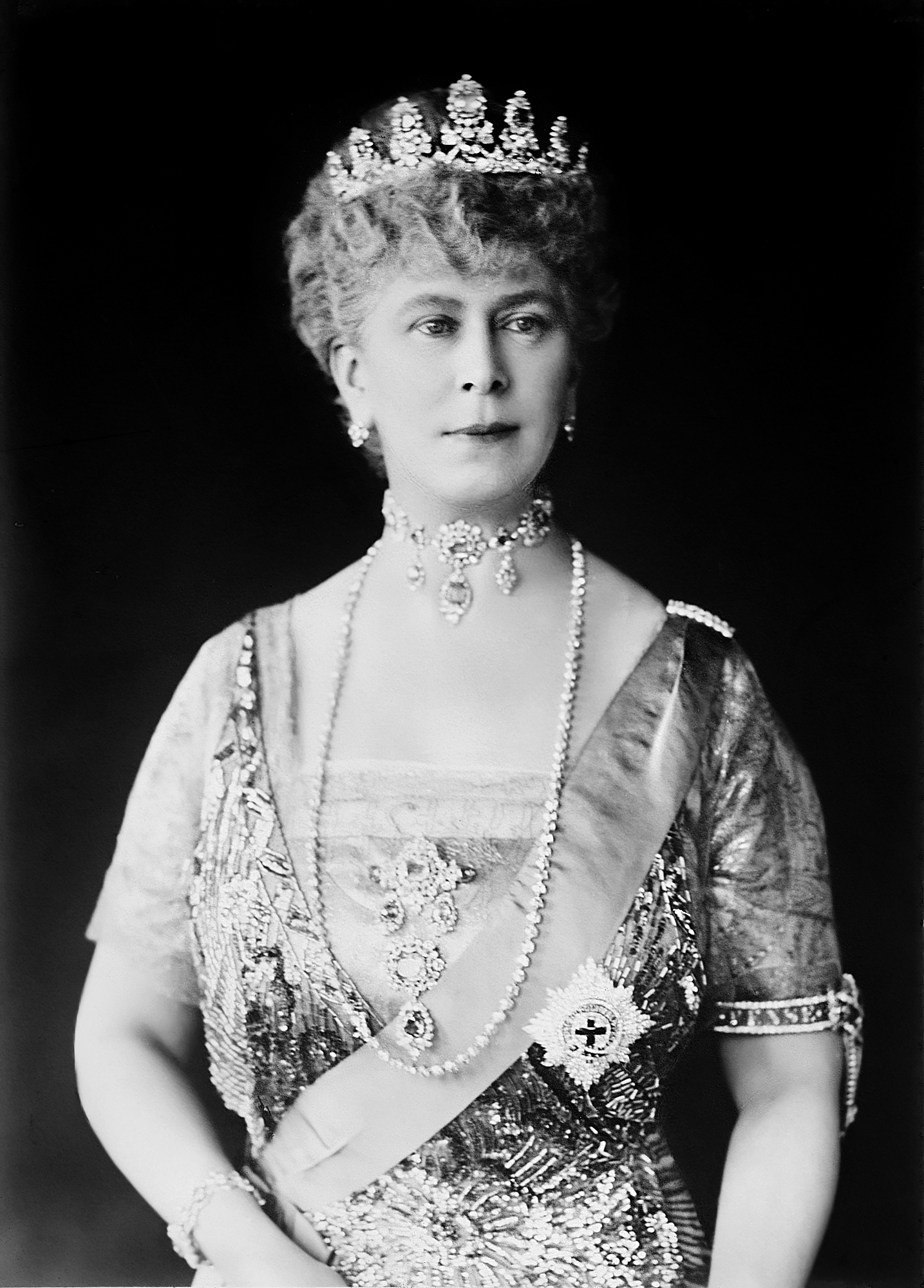
Queen Mary

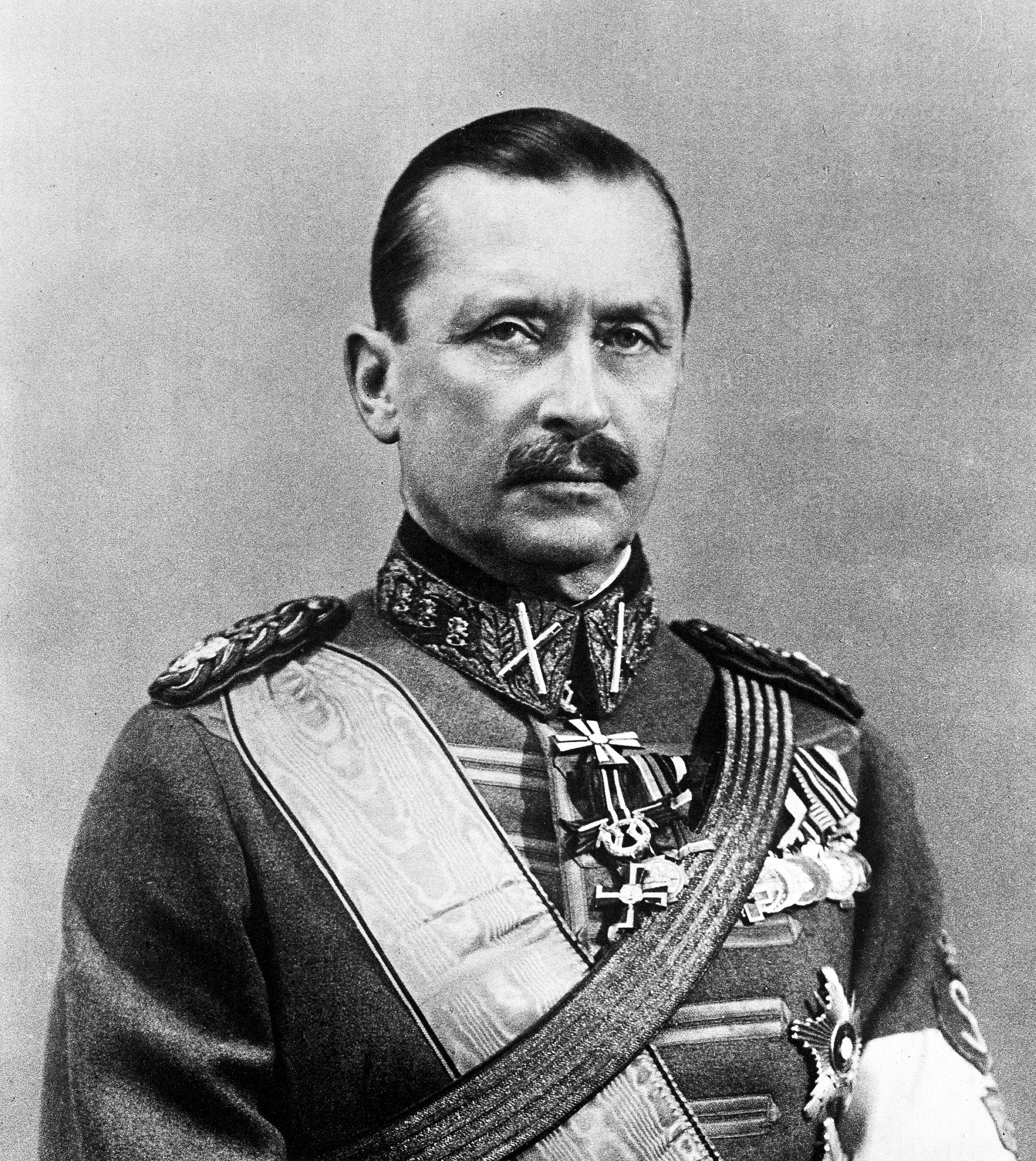
Carl Gustaf Emil Mannerheim

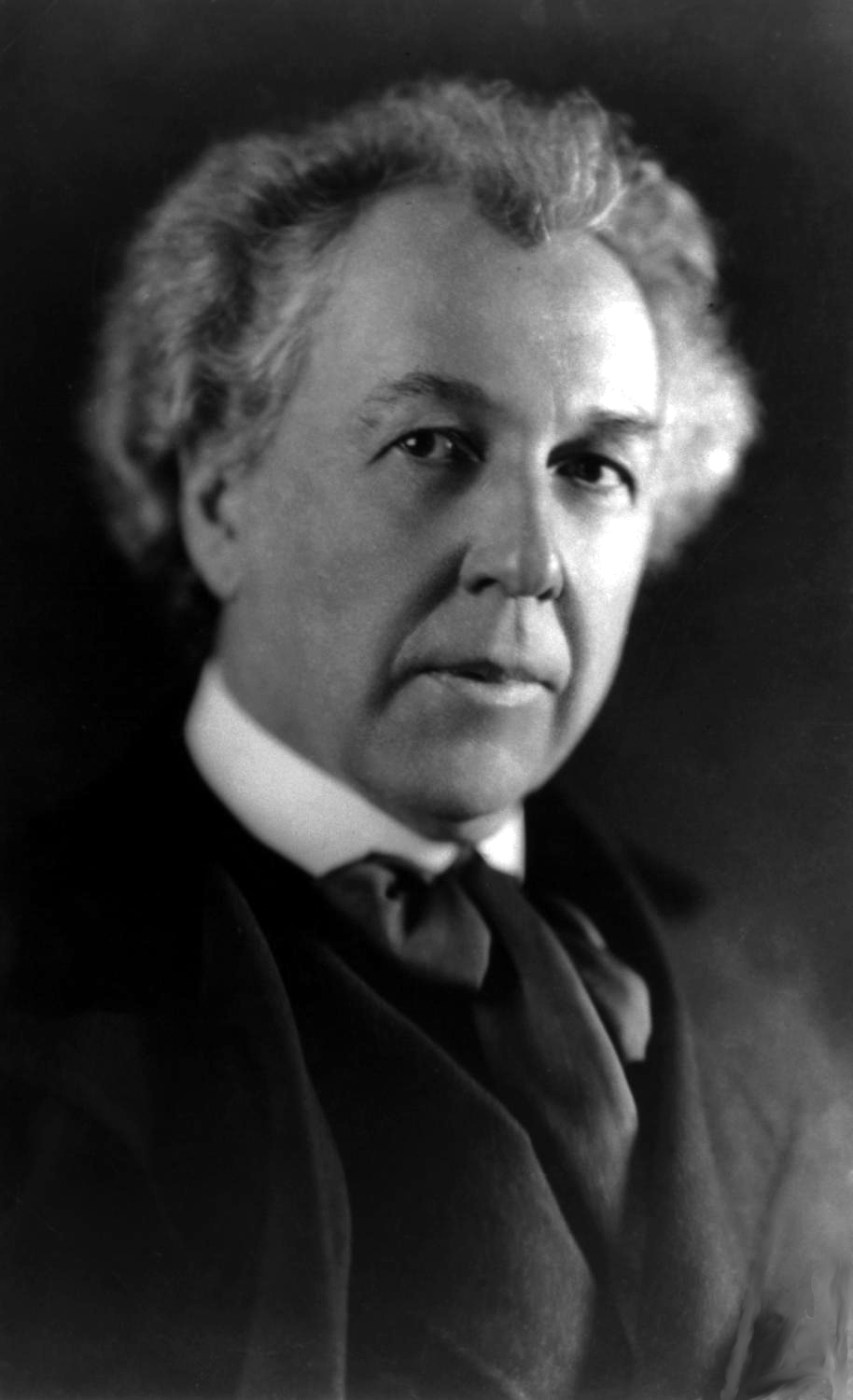
Frank Lloyd Wright

- May 3 – J. T. Hearne, English cricketer (d. 1944)
- May 7 – Władysław Reymont, Polish writer, Nobel Prize laureate (d. 1925)
- May 14 – Kurt Eisner, German politician, publicist (d. 1919)
- May 26 – Queen Mary, wife of George V of Great Britain (d. 1953)
- June 2 – William Goodenough, British admiral (d. 1945)
- June 4 – Carl Gustaf Emil Mannerheim, Finnish military leader and 6th President of Finland (d. 1951)
- June 8 – Frank Lloyd Wright, American architect (d. 1959)
- June 9 – Clarence Geldart, Canadian-American actor (d. 1935)
- June 17 – Flora Finch, British-American silent film comedian (d. 1940)
- June 20 – Leon Wachholz, Polish scientist and medical examiner (d. 1942)
- June 24 – J. Gordon Edwards, American film director (d. 1925)
- June 28 – Luigi Pirandello, Italian writer, Nobel Prize laureate (d. 1936)
- June 30 – Edward L. Beach, Sr., American naval officer, author (d. 1943)

=== July–August ===
- July 8 – Käthe Kollwitz, German artist (d. 1945)
- July 10 – Prince Maximilian of Baden, Chancellor of Germany (d. 1929)
- July 18 – Margaret "Molly" Brown, American socialite, philanthropist, and RMS Titanic survivor (d. 1932)
- July 24 – E. F. Benson, English writer (d. 1940)
- July 27 – Enrique Granados, Spanish composer (d. 1916)
- July 28 – Charles Dillon Perrine, American-born astronomer (d. 1951)
- July 29 – Berthold Oppenheim, Moravian rabbi (d. 1942)
- August 3 – Stanley Baldwin, Prime Minister of the United Kingdom (d. 1947)
- August 9 – Evelina Haverfield, British suffragette (d. 1920)
- August 11 – Hobart Bosworth, American film actor, director, writer and producer (d. 1943)
- August 12 – Edith Hamilton, German-born American educator, author (d. 1963)
- August 14 – John Galsworthy, English writer, Nobel Prize laureate (d. 1933)
- August 22 – Maximilian Bircher-Benner, Swiss physician, nutritionist (d. 1939)
- August 28 – Umberto Giordano, Italian opera composer (d. 1948)

=== September–October ===
- September 5 – Amy Beach, American pianist, composer (d. 1944)
- September 7 – Albert Bassermann, German actor (d. 1952)
- September 12 – Alfredo Acton, Italian admiral and politician (d. 1934)
- September 16 – Vintilă Brătianu, 31st Prime Minister of Romania (d. 1930)
- September 17 – W. H. Ellis, American attorney and politician (d. 1948)
- September 21 – Charles Bathurst, 1st Viscount Bledisloe, English politician, 4th Governor-General of New Zealand (d. 1958)
- September 28
  - James Edwin Campbell, American educator, school administrator, newspaper editor, poet, and essayist (d. 1896)
  - Hiranuma Kiichirō, 24th Prime Minister of Japan (d. 1952)
- September 29 – Walther Rathenau, German statesman, Weimar Republic foreign minister (d. 1922)
- October 2 – James Stevenson-Hamilton, 1st warden of South Africa's Kruger National Park (d. 1957)
- October 12 – Lyn Harding, Welsh actor (d. 1952)
- October 14 – Masaoka Shiki, Japanese haiku poet (d. 1902)
- October 16 – Mario Ruspoli, 2nd Prince of Poggio Suasa (d. 1963)
- October 25
  - Hiranuma Kiichirō, 35th Prime Minister of Japan (d. 1952)
  - Józef Dowbor-Muśnicki, Polish general (d. 1937)
- October 27 – Viola Allen, American actress (d. 1948)
- October 30 – Ed Delahanty, American Baseball Hall of Famer (d. 1903)

=== November–December ===
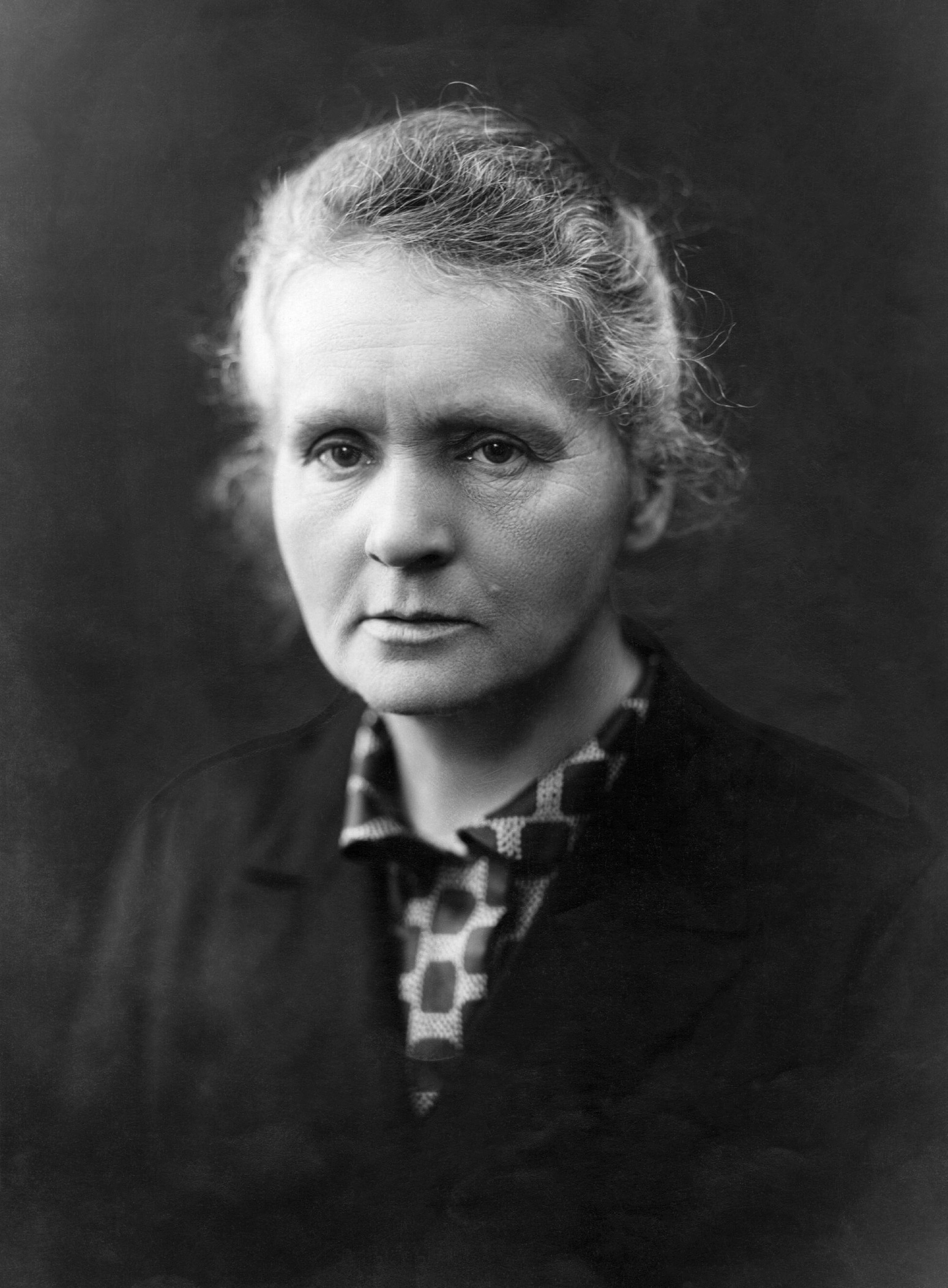
Marie Curie

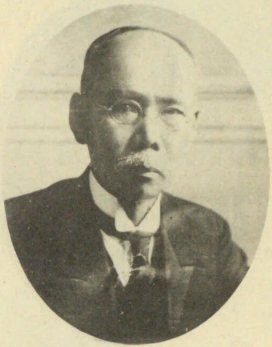
Nakamura Yoshikoto

- November 7
  - Marie Curie, Polish-born scientist, recipient of the Nobel Prize in Chemistry and physics (d. 1934)
  - George Paish, English economist (d. 1957)
- November 8 – Sadakichi Hartmann, German/Japanese critic, poet (d. 1944)
- November 9 – Shrimad Rajchandra, prominent Indian Jain philosopher, scholar, poet & spiritual mentor of Mahatma Gandhi (d. 1901)
- November 17 – Henri Gouraud, French general (d. 1946)
- November 30 – János Vaszary, Hungarian painter and graphic artist (d. 1939)
- December 1 – Ignacy Mościcki, President of Poland (d. 1946)
- December 2 – Alec B. Francis, English actor (d. 1934)
- December 5 – Józef Piłsudski, Polish statesman, field marshal (d. 1935)
- December 13 – Kristian Birkeland, Norwegian physicist (d. 1917)
- December 16 – Amy Carmichael, Irish Protestant missionary (d. 1951)
- December 18 – Nakamura Yoshikoto, Japanese entrepreneur and politician, Mayor of Tokyo (d. 1927)
- December 23 – Madam C. J. Walker, first African-American millionaire (d. 1919)
- December 23 – Clotilde Apponyi, Hungarian women's rights activist, diplomat (d. 1942)
- December 26 – Yordan Milanov, Bulgarian architect (d. 1932)

=== Date unknown ===
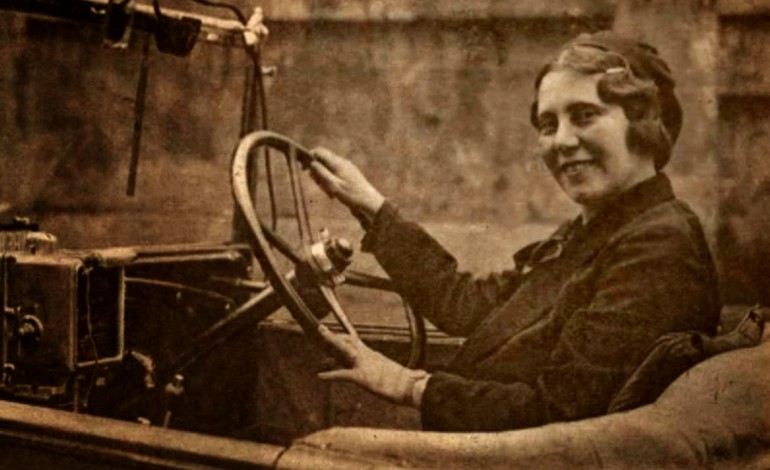
Elena Meissner

- Lilian Bell, American novelist and travel writer (d. 1929)
- Habib Pacha Es-Saad, 3rd Prime Minister and 2nd President of Lebanon (d. 1942)
- Florence Fuller, South African-born Australian artist (d. 1946)
- Zhang Haipeng, Chinese and Manchukuoan general (d. 1949)
- Abdul Awwal Jaunpuri, Indian Islamic scholar and author (d. 1921)
- Elena Meissner, Romanian women's rights activist (d. 1940)

== Deaths ==
=== January–June ===
Emperor Kōmei

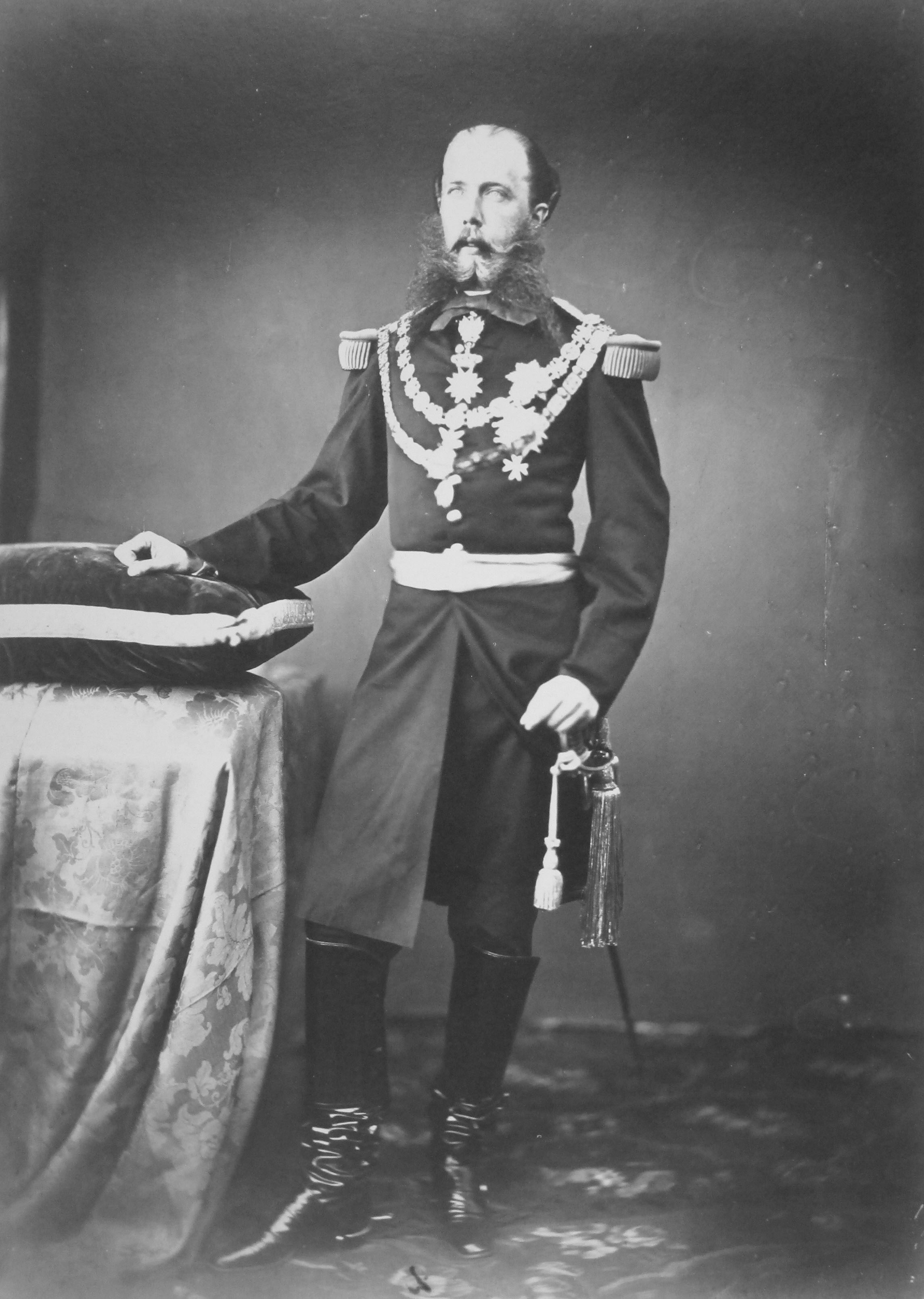
Emperor Maximilian I of Mexico

- January 14 – Jean-Auguste-Dominique Ingres, French painter (b. 1780)
- January 28 – Ary Prins, Acting Governor-General of the Dutch East Indies who served 2 terms (b. 1816)
- January 30 – Emperor Kōmei, 121st Emperor of Japan (b. 1831)
- March 6 – Artemus Ward, American humorist (b. 1834) (tuberculosis)
- March 25 – Friedlieb Ferdinand Runge, German chemist (b. 1794)
- April 1 – Louis du Couret, French explorer, writer and military officer (b. 1812)
- April 12 – David Canabarro, Brazilian general, Gaúcho revolutionary (b. 1796)
- April 18 – Robert Smirke, British architect (b. 1780)
- April 27 – Benjamin Hall, 1st Baron Llanover, after whom Big Ben may be named (b. 1802)
- May 12 – Friedrich Wilhelm Eduard Gerhard, German archaeologist (b. 1795)
- May 23 – William Crawshay II, Welsh industrialist (b. 1788)
- May 29 – Margaretta Morris, American entomologist (b. 1797)
- May 30 – Ramón Castilla, Peruvian military leader and politician, three times President of Peru (b. 1797)
- June 19 – Emperor Maximilian I of Mexico (executed) (b. 1832)

=== July–December ===
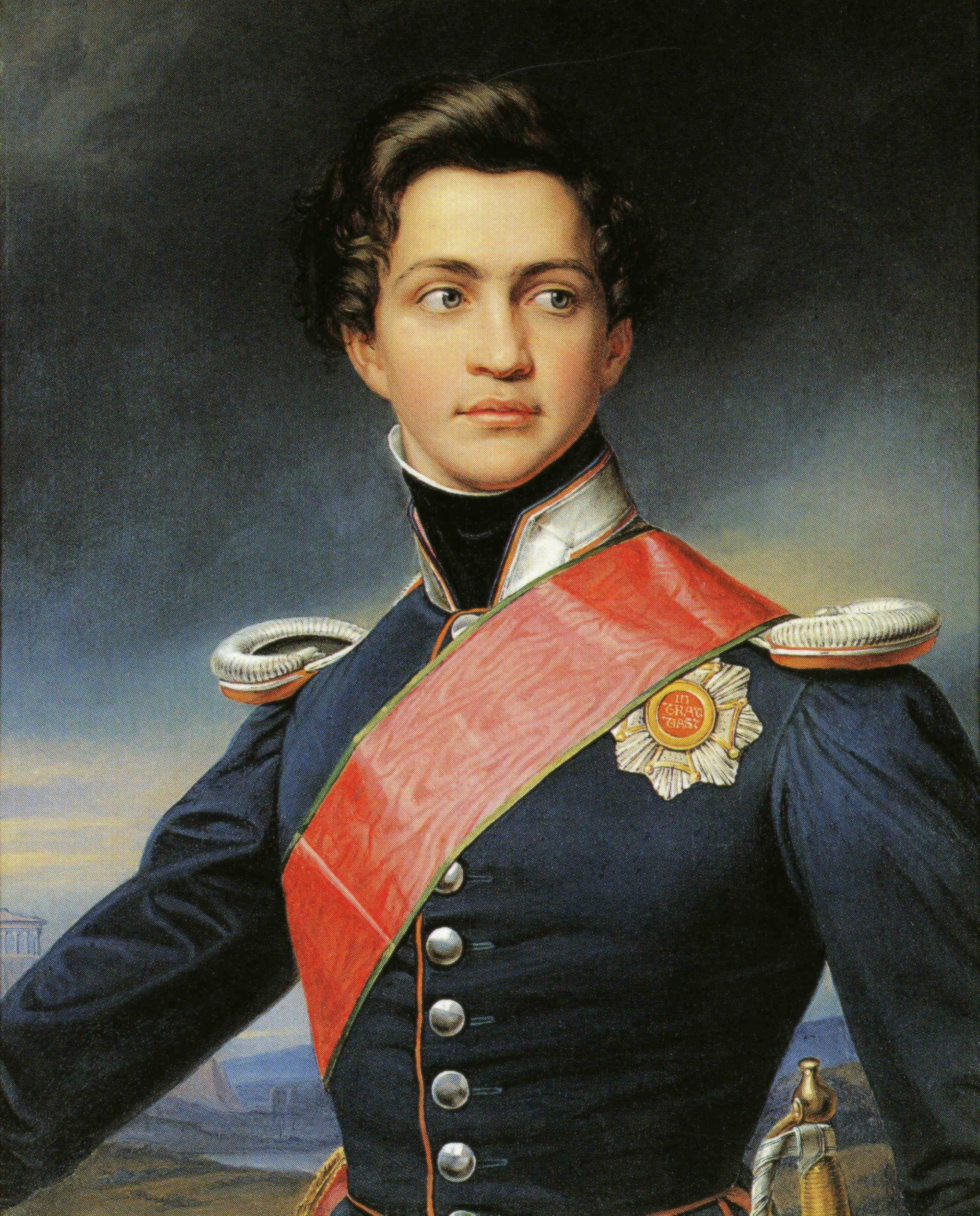
King Otto of Greece

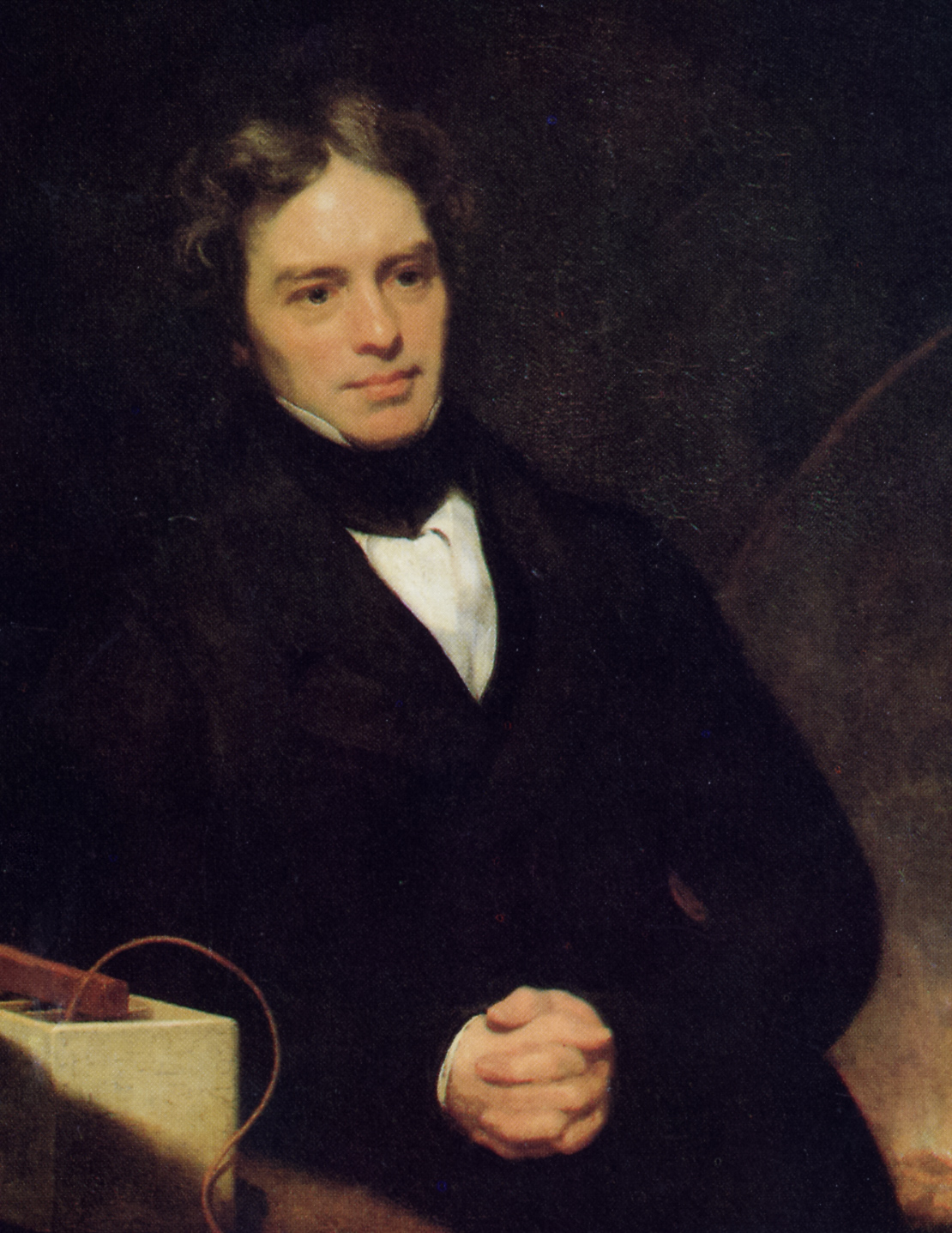
Michael Faraday

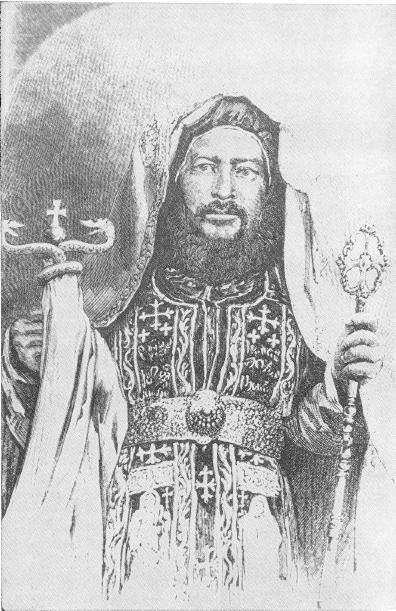
Metropolitan Abuna Salama III

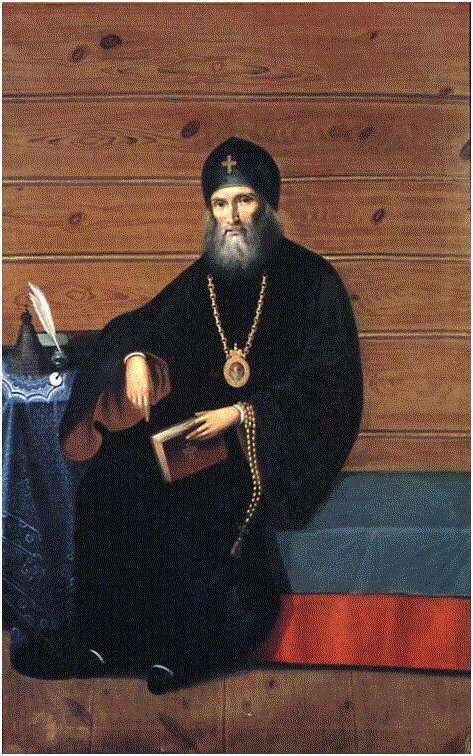
Filaret, Metropolitan of Moscow

- July – Thomas Baker, Methodist missionary to Fiji (b. 1832)
- July 1 – Thomas Francis Meagher, American Civil War general (b. 1823)
- July 26 – King Otto of Greece (b. 1815)
- July 31
  - Benoît Fourneyron, French engineer, inventor of the turbine (b. 1802)
  - Catharine Maria Sedgwick, American "domestic fiction" novelist (b. 1789)
- August 3 – August Böckh, German scholar and antiquarian (b. 1785)
- August 6 – David R. Porter, American politician (b. 1788)
- August 8 – Maria Theresa of Austria, second Queen consort of Ferdinand II of the Two Sicilies (b. 1816)
- August 21 – Juan Álvarez, interim president of Mexico in 1855 (b. 1790)
- August 25 – Michael Faraday, English chemist and physicist (b. 1791)
- August 31 – Charles Baudelaire, French writer (b. 1821)
- September 10 – Simon Sechter, Austrian music teacher (b. 1788)
- September 26 – James Ferguson, Scotland-born American astronomer (b. 1797)
- October – Kerekorio Manu Rangi, last king of Easter Island, tuberculosis (b. 1853/5)
- October 9 – Ignacy Feliks Dobrzyński, Polish composer (b. 1807)
- October 11 – Gunatitanand Swami, Indian paramahamsa of the Hindu Swaminarayan Sampraday sect (b. 1785)
- October 23 – Franz Bopp, German linguist (b. 1791)
- October 25 – Abuna Salama III, metropolitan of the Ethiopian Church
- October 31 – William Parsons, 3rd Earl of Rosse, Irish astronomer (b. 1800)
- November 19
  - Fitz-Greene Halleck, American poet (b. 1790)
  - Ren Zhu, Chinese leader of the Nian Rebellion, killed in battle (b. 1830?)
- December 1 – Filaret, Metropolitan of Moscow, Russian Orthodox leader (b. 1782)
- December 10 – Sakamoto Ryōma, Japanese samurai, politician and businessman (b. 1836)
- December 26 – József Kossics, Hungarian-Slovenian Catholic priest, writer and ethnologist (b. 1788)
- December 30 – Sarah Booth, English actress (b. 1793)
