= Zeta Phi Eta =

American communications fraternity

- ΖΦΗ
- Founded: October 10, 1893; 133 years ago Northwestern University
- Type: Professional
- Affiliation: Independent
- Former affiliation: PFA; PPA
- Status: Active
- Emphasis: Communication Arts and Sciences
- Scope: National
- Motto: "Achieve! with Wisdom, Integrity and Love"
- Colors: Rose and White
- Flower: "La France" rose
- Publication: The Cameo
- Chapters: 6
- Logo
- Headquarters: c/o Valerie Glowinski; 2349 North Windsor Drive; Arlington Heights, Illinois 60004; United States
- Website: www.zetaphieta.org

Zeta Phi Eta (ΖΦΗ) is an American professional fraternity for communication arts and sciences. It was founded in 1893 at Northwestern University in Evanston, Illinois. It is recognized as the oldest professional fraternity for women, although its membership is now co-educational.

== History ==
Zeta Phi Eta was originally formed as the F.O.E. Club at Northwestern University in Evanston, Illinois, on October 10, 1893, as the first professional oratory arts fraternity. Edith deVore conceived the idea of a club for students of the School of Oratory (later the School of Communication). DeVore was joined by Molly Connor, Lelia LIttle, Maude Newell, and Laurine Wright. The group called itself the F.O.E. Club, vowing to be a "Friend of Each, Each Our Friend". The women met in secret before receiving formal approval for the Zeta Phi Eta fraternity from the dean of the School of Oratory in 1894.

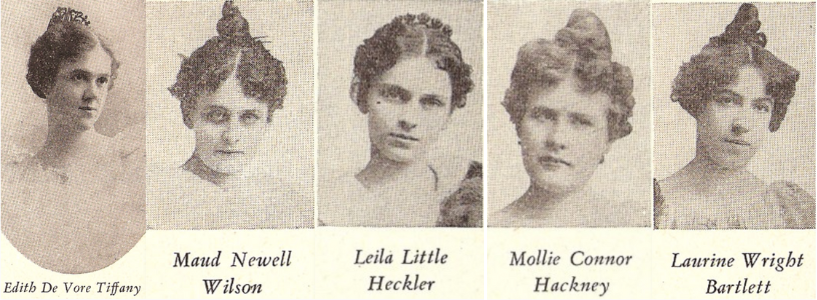
Zeta Phi Eta founders as photographed for the Northwestern University yearbook.

The fraternity was incorporated on June 25, 1902 under the laws of the State of Illinois. Reflecting the organization’s status as a professional, rather than an honorary or social, society, the charter proclaims, “This society is to promote a greater excellence in oratorical and dramatic art, and to develop a social interest and a stronger friendship toward each other.”

In 1908, the fraternity merged with Phi Eta Sigma, a similar organization at Emerson College of Oratory in Boston, Massachusetts, as Zeta Phi Eta. When the fraternities merged, Phi Eta Sigma became the Alpha chapter and the Northwestern group became the Beta chapter. During the 1910s and 1920s, campus and alumnae chapters grew quickly at institutions around the country. The fraternity first published The Cameo in 1913, a quarterly national magazine.

In 1941, the fraternity had initiated 3,000 women across nineteen collegiate chapters and fifteen alumnae chapters. Since 1950, the fraternity broadened its focus in the speech arts to include communications arts and sciences.

Zeta Phi Eta's affiliations over the years have included the American Educational Theatre Association, the American National Theatre and Academy, the American Theatre Association, the Children's Theatre Association, the Speech Association of America, and the Speech Communications Association. It is a former member of the Professional Panhellenic Association now the Professional Fraternity Association.

== Symbols ==
The cameo and pearl pin of Alpha became the national fraternity's official badge, and the shield and torch of Beta became its coat of arms. The Zeta Phi Eta badge is a rose-colored cameo upon which is carved the Greek letters "ΖΦΗ" in white, surrounded by 23 pearls.

The fraternity's colors are rose and white. Its flower is the "La France" rose. Its magazine is The Cameo, along with occasionally a Prospectus and Pledge Manual.

== Activities ==
In 1955, the Zeta Phi Eta Foundation was established to contribute to "worthy speech and drama projects". One long-term project initiated by the Zeta alumnae in 1960 was a full-scale nationwide tape recording program for the Library of Congress, recording tapes of published works for access by blind patrons. Another national project, Graduate Assistantship Opportunities, was designed to provide professional guidance to senior members of campus chapters upon entering graduate school.

== Membership ==
While originally established as a women-exclusive sorority, Zeta Phi Eta began extending its membership to male students in 1975. Since its founding, Zeta Phi Eta membership has expanded to welcome undergraduate and graduate students focusing on a wide range of communications-related fields. These include creative writing, drama, English literature, graphic design, journalism, language studies, marketing, photography, political science, public relations, and speech language pathology.

== Chapters ==
In 2025, Zeta Phi Eta has six active collegiate chapters and five active professional chapters; although it has chartered 59 collegiate chapters.

== Notable members ==
=== Collegiate ===
- Isobel Carothers (Beta), co-creator and star of the 1930s WGN radio program, “Clara, Lu and Em”
- Helen King (Beta), co-creator and star of the 1930s WGN radio program, “Clara, Lu and Em”
- Louise Starkey (Beta), co-creator and star of the 1930s WGN radio program, “Clara, Lu and Em”
- Winifred Ward (Beta), founder of the Children’s Theatre of Evanston

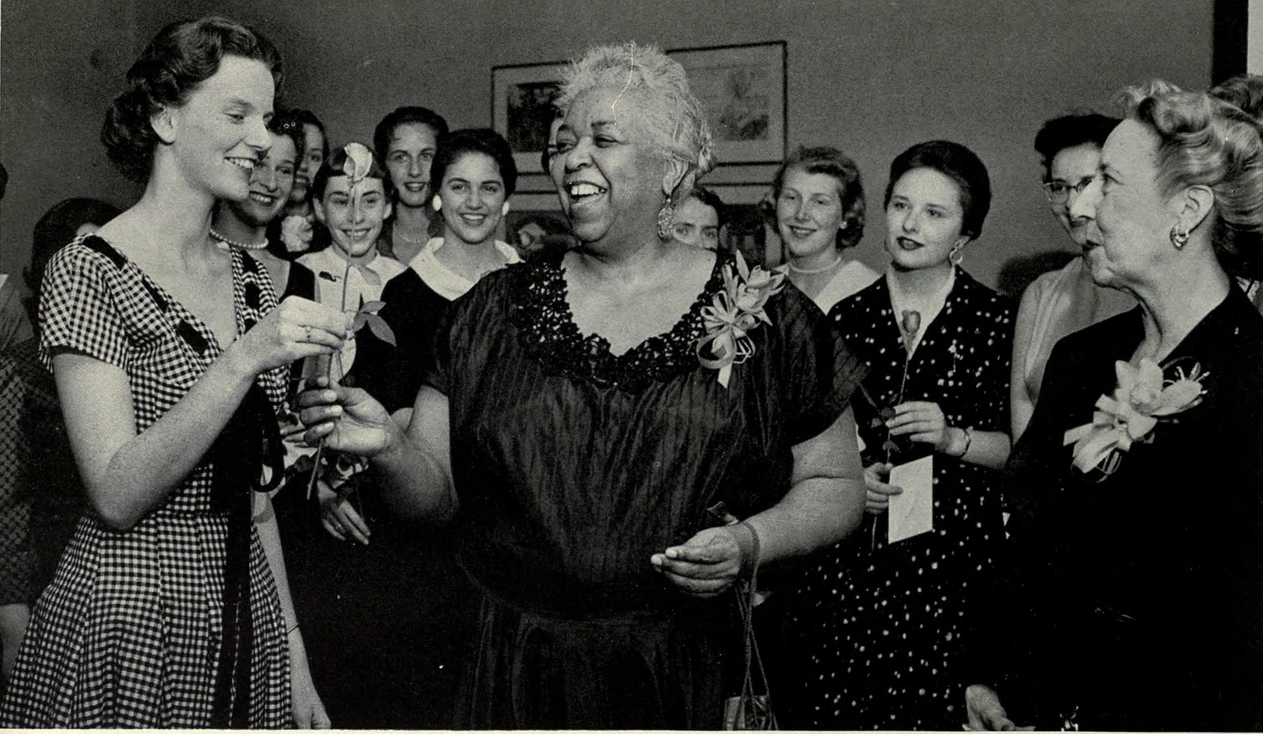
Ethel Waters being initiated as an honorary member of Zeta Phi Eta, May 1956

=== Honorary ===
- Madge Evans stage and film actress
- Charlton Heston, actor
- Jessica Tandy, actress
- Ethel Waters, singer and actress

== See also ==
- Professional fraternities and sororities
