= List of Zeta Phi Eta chapters =

Zeta Phi Eta is an American professional fraternity for communication arts and sciences. It was founded in 1893 at Northwestern University in Evanston, Illinois. The fraternity has both college and professional chapters.

== Collegiate chapters ==
Following are the collegiate chapters of Zeta Phi Eta, with active chapters noted in bold and inactive chapters in italics:

Chapter	Charter date and range	Institution	Location	Status	Ref.
Beta	October 10, 1893 – 19xx ?	Northwestern University	Evanston, Illinois	Inactive	
**Alpha**	1908	Emerson College	Boston, Massachusetts	Active	(Note: Originated as Phi Eta Sigma (local) at the Emerson College of Oratory, now Emerson College.)
**Delta**	1914	Syracuse University	Syracuse, New York	Active	
Epsilon	1917–19xx ?	Brenau University	Gainesville, Georgia	Inactive	
Zeta	1919–19xx ?	Southern Methodist University	University Park, Texas	Inactive	
Eta	1921–19xx ?	University of Southern California	Los Angeles, California	Inactive	
Gamma	1921–19xx ?	Drake University	Des Moines, Iowa	Inactive	
Theta	1924–1937	Coe College	Cedar Rapids, Iowa	Inactive	
Iota	1926–1942	University of North Dakota	Grand Forks, North Dakota	Inactive	
Kappa	1928–1936	Washington University in St. Louis	St. Louis County, Missouri	Inactive	
Lambda	1930–1968	University of Michigan	Ann Arbor, Michigan	Inactive	
Mu	1930–1974	University of Washington	Seattle, Washington	Inactive	
Nu	1930–19xx ?	University of California, Los Angeles	Los Angeles, California	Inactive	
Xi	1931–1951	University of Alabama	Tuscaloosa, Alabama	Inactive	
Omicron	1932–19xx ?	University of Wisconsin–Madison	Madison, Wisconsin	Inactive	
Pi	1934–1969	University of Minnesota	Minneapolis, Minnesota	Inactive	
Rho	1934–1972	Alabama State University	Montgomery, Alabama	Inactive	
Sigma	1936–19xx ?	University of Iowa	Iowa City, Iowa	Inactive	
Tau	1937–19xx ?	University of Illinois Urbana-Champaign	Urbana/Champaign, Illinois	Inactive	
Upsilon	1937–19xx ?	Florida State University	Tallahassee, Florida	Inactive	
Phi	1939–19xx ?	University of Arizona	Tucson, Arizona	Inactive	
Chi	1941–19xx ?	Ohio State University	Columbus, Ohio	Inactive	
Psi	1943–19xx ?	University of Georgia	Athens, Georgia	Inactive	
Alpha Alpha	1945–1974	University of Science and Arts	Chickasha, Oklahoma	Inactive	
Alpha Beta	1945–19xx ?	University of Denver	Denver, Colorado	Inactive	
Alpha Gamma	1945–19xx ?	University of Utah	Salt Lake City, Utah	Inactive	
Omega	1945–19xx ?	Texas Woman's University	Denton, Texas	Inactive	
Alpha Delta	1947–19xx ?	University of South Dakota	Vermillion, South Dakota	Inactive	
Alpha Epsilon	1947–19xx ?	Occidental University	Los Angeles, California	Inactive	
Alpha Zeta	1950–19xx ?	Wichita State University	Wichita, Kansas	Inactive	
Alpha Eta	1951–19xx ?	University of Mary Washington	Fredericksburg, Virginia	Inactive	
Alpha Theta	1952–19xx ?	Marquette University	Milwaukee, Wisconsin	Inactive	
Alpha Iota	1956–19xx ?	Southern Illinois University	Carbondale, Illinois	Inactive	
Alpha Kappa	1958–19xx ?	University of Miami	Coral Gables, Florida	Inactive	
Alpha Lambda	1958–19xx ?	University of Florida	Gainesville, Florida	Inactive	
Alpha Mu	1959–19xx ?	American University	Washington, D.C.	Inactive	
Alpha Nu	1959–19xx ?	University of Oklahoma	Norman, Oklahoma	Inactive	
Alpha Xi	1962–19xx ?	University of Portland	Portland, Oregon	Inactive	
Alpha Omicron	1966–1975 ?	Southern Illinois University Edwardsville	Edwardsville, Illinois	Inactive	
Alpha Pi	1967–19xx ?	Oregon State University	Corvallis, Oregon	Inactive	
Alpha Rho	1968–19xx ?	West Virginia University	Morgantown, West Virginia	Inactive	
Alpha Sigma	1969–19xx ?	Western Kentucky University	Bowling Green, Kentucky	Inactive	
Alpha Tau	1970–19xx ?	Baylor University	Waco, Texas	Inactive	
Alpha Upsilon	1972–1974	University of Missouri–Kansas City	Kansas City, Missouri	Inactive	
Alpha Phi	1974–19xx ?	University of Wisconsin, Whitewater	Whitewater, Wisconsin	Inactive	
Alpha Chi	1975–19xx ?	University of Texas at Arlington	Arlington, Texas	Inactive	
Alpha Psi	1975–19xx ?	Texas Southern University	Houston, Texas	Inactive	
Alpha Omega	1978–19xx ?	University of Wyoming	Laramie, Wyoming	Inactive	
Beta Alpha	1980–19xx ?	Monmouth College	West Long Branch, New Jersey	Inactive	
Beta Beta	1981–19xx ?	Rider University	Lawrenceville, New Jersey	Inactive	
Beta Gamma	1992–19xx ?	Edgewood College	Madison, Wisconsin	Inactive	
Beta Delta	1993–19xx ?	Clarion University	Clarion, Pennsylvania	Inactive	
Beta Epsilon	2005–202x ?	Slippery Rock University	Slippery Rock, Pennsylvania	Inactive	
Beta Zeta	2005–20xx ?	University of Texas	Austin, Texas	Inactive	
**Beta Eta**	2013	Hofstra University	Hempstead, New York	Active	
**Beta Theta**	2014	University of Toledo	Toledo, Ohio	Active	
**Beta Iota**	2015	University of Central Florida	Orlando, Florida	Active	
Beta Kappa	2015–201x ?	Morehead State University	Morehead, Kentucky	Inactive	
**Beta Lambda**	2017	Jacksonville State University	Jacksonville, Alabama	Active	

== Professional chapters ==
Professional chapters of Zeta Phi Eta are located in:

Chapter	Location	Status	Ref.
Boston	Boston, Massachusetts	Active	
Chicago North Shore	Chicago, Illinois	Active	
Oklahoma City	Oklahoma City, Oklahoma	Active	
Portland	Portland, Oregon	Active	
Southern California	Los Angeles California	Active	
