= Winifred Ward =

Professor at Northwestern University, known for work in children's theatre

Winifred Louise Ward
- Born: October 29, 1884; Eldora, Iowa, US
- Died: August 16, 1975 (aged 90); Evanston, Illinois, US
- Known for: Creative Drama, Children's Theater

Winifred Louise Ward (October 29, 1884–August 16, 1975) was a professor at Northwestern University most notable for having done significant work in the field of children's theatre and pioneering the idea of creative dramatics.

== Early life and education ==
Ward was born October 29, 1884, in Eldora, Iowa, the youngest daughter of Frances Allena Dimmick and George W. Ward, a prominent Eldora lawyer. While growing up, she spent many summers in Washington, D.C., where she was afforded the opportunity to watch theatrical performances that influenced her throughout her career. She received her bachelor's degree in 1905 from Northwestern University, under the guidance of Robert McClean Cumnock. She then returned to her hometown where she directed plays until becoming a teacher of reading, drama and physical education in the public schools of Adrian, Michigan from 1908 to 1916. In 1918, after receiving her Ph.D. in Education from the University of Chicago, Ward accepted an appointment to the faculty of Northwestern’s School of Oratory (Communications). She remained at Northwestern for the rest of her career.

== The Mother of Creative Drama ==
Ward founded the field of Creative Drama, a classroom teaching method that places a heavy emphasis on self-expression, literature appreciation, and proficiency in spoken English. It is noted for having a complete lack of scripts. In her own words, "instead of memorizing set speeches and acting parts in the way the teacher directs, the children develop plays out of their own thoughts and imaginations and emotions". When Ward first started working with Creative Drama, she used the phrase "Creative Dramatics" which is now less often used.

Ward is often dubbed the mother of creative drama; the “systematic approach to dramatic activity and learning.”

In 1924, Ward was appointed supervisor of the newly created creative dramatics curricula of the Evanston Public Schools. The next year she founded The Children’s Theatre of Evanston, created with “double purpose of providing a worthy service to Evanston and giving the Speech students a laboratory in the study of theater for youth.” In 1944 she organized the first national Children’s Theater Conference, which later became the American Alliance for Theatre and Education (AATE).

Ward retired as an assistant professor from Northwestern in 1950. For the next twenty years, she wrote, taught drama workshops around the country, and participated in numerous conferences and conventions related to her field. She died in Evanston, Illinois, on August 16, 1975.

== Ward's philosophy ==
Rooted in the progressive education movement of the 1930s, Ward sought to educate the whole child, with the notion that, “the child could achieve an understanding of self and society.” Ward’s method emphasizes storytelling that grows from nonverbal movement and pantomime, eventually becoming dialogue and characterization and ultimately an integrated drama. Stories told from literature, popular culture, poems, and fairy tales are a hallmark of Ward’s work. Ward emphasized the study of characters as a vital phase for understanding multiple perspectives both in drama and in life. Her workshops often culminated in informal performances for invited guests. Ward believed that creative drama was one way to create productive members of a democratic society.

== Publications ==
=== Books ===
Ward wrote four books:

- Creative Dramatics, 1930, D. Appleton & Co., N.Y.
- Theater for Children, 1939, 2nd Ed. 1948, D. Appleton-Century Co., Inc., N.Y.
- Playmaking With Children, 1947, 2nd E. 1957, Appleton-Century-Crofts, N.Y.
- Stories to Dramatize, 1952, published by the Children's Theater Press, Cloverlot, Anchorage, Kentucky

=== Pamphlets ===
Ward also wrote two pamphlets:

- Choice and Direction of Children's Plays, 1928, L.D. Horner, Redfield, Iowa
- Drama with and for Children, 1960, U.S. Department of Health, Education and Welfare, Office of Education.

== Honors ==
Ward received honorary degrees and awards from numerous universities and organizations, including:

- The Northwestern Alumni Association Alumni Merit Award in 1945
- The Northwestern Alumni Association Alumni Medal, the highest honor given by the alumni association, in 1950
- An honorary degree of Doctor of Humane Letters from Adelphi College in 1953
- The Zeta Phi Eta (Drama) Society “Zeta of the Year” Award, 1961
- The Medallion of Honor, the highest national tribute made in educational theater, from Theta Alpha Phi, 1964
- She was designated a Fellow of the AATE, the organization's highest honor, in 1967
- She was awarded the first ever Orlin Corey Medallion by the Children's Theatre Foundation of America in 1992

In her honor, several awards are given out by the AATE:

- Zeta Phi Eta-Winifred Ward Outstanding New Children's Theatre Company Award, which honors a theatre company serving young audiences and which has attained a high level of artistic production and possesses sound management practices while having stimulated community interest in its endeavors.
- Winifred Ward Scholar, which honors a graduate-level scholar of demonstrated intellectual and artistic ability in child drama/theatre.
