= Regent's Park skating disaster =

1867 disaster in London, England

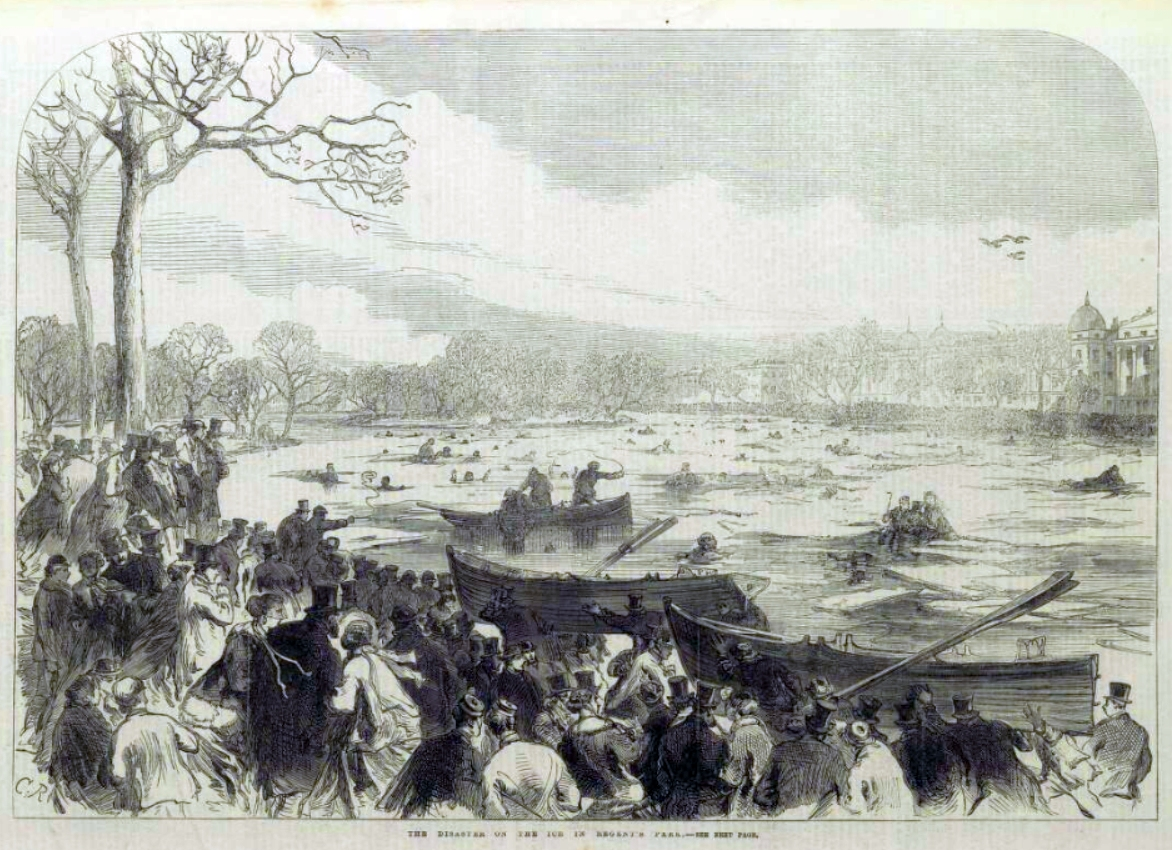
- The accident as depicted by The Illustrated London News
- Date: 15 January 1867
- Location: Regent's Park, London, UK; 51°31′40″N 00°09′34″W
- Cause: Breaking ice
- Deaths: 40
- Inquest: 21 January 1867
- Verdict: Accidental death in all cases

The Regent's Park skating disaster occurred on 15 January 1867 when 40 people died after the ice broke on the lake in London's Regent's Park, pitching about 200 people into icy water up to 12 ft (3.7 m) deep. Most were rescued by bystanders, but 40 people died either from hypothermia or by drowning. At the time, this catastrophe was considered the worst weather-related accident in British history. One consequence of the accident was that the lakebed was raised and the lake's maximum depth reduced to 4 ft (1.2 m), to help prevent future adult drownings.

== Background ==
January 1867 was an exceptionally cold month in Britain, and many open water areas froze over. One of these was the boating lake in Regent's Park in London, England. Ice skating was a popular pastime in Britain at the time, and many hundreds of people went skating on the lake, taking advantage of the frozen waters. On 14 January 1867, the ice cracked: 21 people dropped into the water, but all were pulled out alive.

== Disaster ==
Overnight, the ice refroze, and the following day, about 500 people took to the ice with an estimated 2,000 more watching. At 3:30 pm the ice was heard to crack, and almost half of the skaters fell into the water. As many could not swim and were wearing heavy clothing, they sank. Those watching attempted to rescue them by launching boats and pulling branches from trees to use as lifelines. Many were rescued unharmed, while survivors with hypothermia and recovered bodies were taken to the nearby Marylebone workhouse. Recovery of all the bodies took several days as the lake kept refreezing and several bodies had to be removed from the bottom of the lake by divers.

== Inquest and aftermath ==
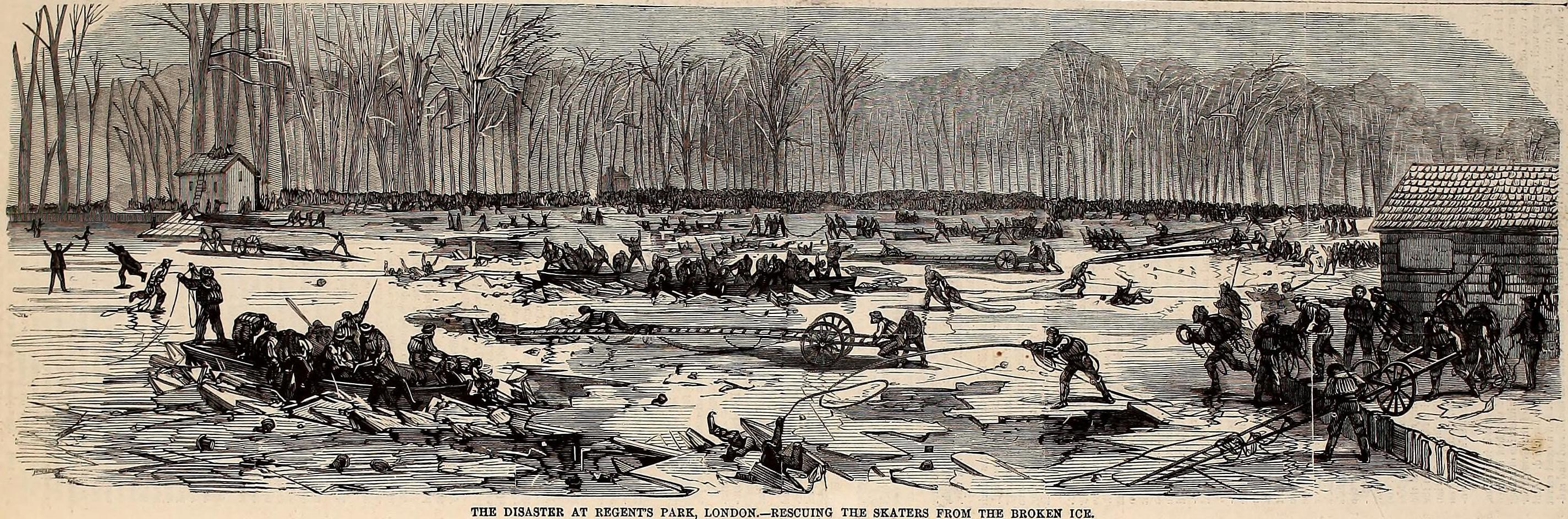
The disaster at Regent's Park, rescuing the skaters from the broken ice; as seen in Harper's Weekly

An inquest was opened at the Marylebone workhouse on 16 January, presided over by Edwin Lankester, the coroner for Central Middlesex, at which time 29 of the 34 bodies recovered had been identified. The inquest resumed on 19 January to identify the remaining bodies, and on 21 January the formal taking of evidence began. Several witnesses were called and it emerged that, on the morning of the tragedy, workmen had been employed in breaking the ice around the islands on the lake to give wildfowl open water. Other evidence given concurred with this, but it was also pointed out that there had been no breaking of the ice at the shoreline.

The jury returned their verdict in the afternoon of 21 January and, despite the evidence regarding intentional breaking of the ice, the verdicts were of accidental death in all 40 cases; 39 due to drowning and one due to hypothermia.

The inquest jury also made a recommendation that the depth of the lake ought to be reduced; Lord John Manners, the First Commissioner of Works was in agreement and in June 1868 it was reported that the lake had been drained, the bottom levelled and lined with concrete and that the depth would be such that a "person of adult stature—might not be drowned".
