= Clara, Lu, 'n Em =

Radio soap opera

Advertisement for Clara, Lu, and Em

Clara, Lu, 'n Em is a radio soap opera, which first aired on June 16, 1930, over WGN Chicago, Illinois. The show was picked up by the NBC Blue radio network and premiered at 10:30 p.m. Eastern Time on January 27, 1931. Thus, it became the first nationally broadcast radio soap opera. When Clara, Lu 'n Em was moved to a regular daytime time slot on February 15, 1932, it became the first networked daytime soap opera.

The first daytime serial drama-by-installment program, network or otherwise, is widely considered by scholars of the genre to be Painted Dreams, when it premiered on WGN's local feed in October 1930.

Clara, Lu, 'n Em continued in various forms through the 1930s and early 1940s on the NBC Blue Network and CBS, finally airing as a syndicated series in 1945.

== Background ==
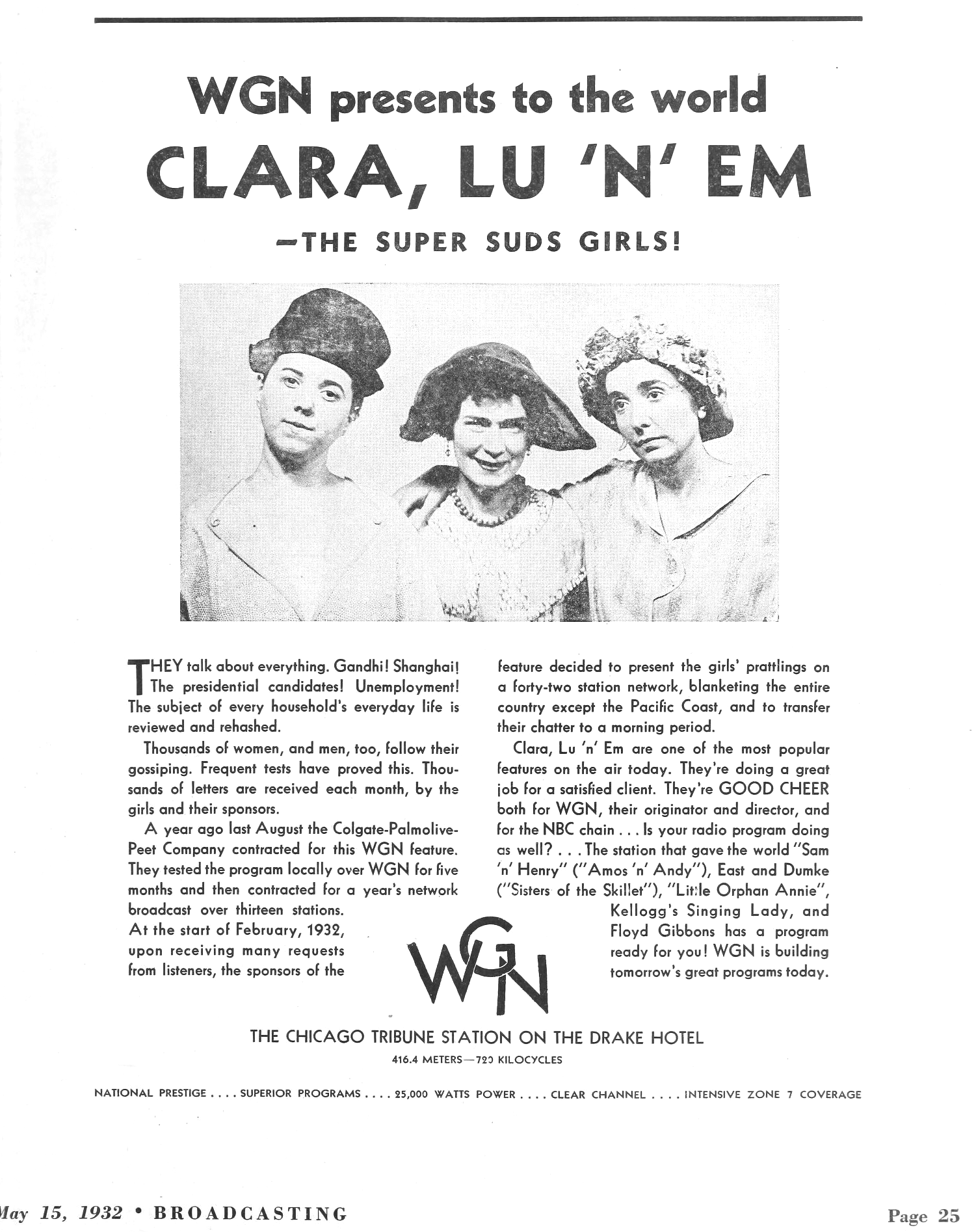
1932 advertisement.

The series began as a Northwestern University sorority sketch by Louise Starkey (Clara), Isobel Carothers (Lu) and Helen King (Em). Rejection by several radio executives in Chicago led the trio to WGN. Program manager Henry Selinger was skeptical of their working without scripts, but their audition convinced him to let them perform without pay. They eventually began writing their own scripts and receiving pay. Super Suds was a sponsor of the program as early as August 1930.

== NBC ==
As interest grew, they were sponsored by Colgate-Palmolive and were heard evenings on the NBC Blue Network from January 27, 1931 to February 12, 1932, before moving to weekdays from February 15, 1932 to March 23, 1934. From March 26, 1934 to January 10, 1936, they ran on the NBC (Red) network. On June 26, 1936, they returned to the NBC Blue Network, doing a weekly evening series, with music by Ted Fio Rito. The 30-minute program was sponsored by Frigidaire dealers.

== Characters and hiatus ==
Story lines centered on three women who lived in a small-town duplex. Clara Roach and her family lived on one side of the duplex, Emma Krueger lived with her family on the other side. Widow Lulu Casey lived upstairs with her daughter Florabelle. When Carothers suddenly died January 8, 1937, at age 32, Starkey and King decided not to continue.

== Return on CBS ==
When the program returned with Starkey and King in 1942 on CBS, another of their Northwestern University friends, Harriet Allyn, portrayed Lu. The show ran three times a week during the daytime.

== Syndicated version ==
In 1945, a syndicated version of the show had a brief run. Allyn continued in the cast as Em, along with Fran Allison as Clara and Dorothy Day as Lu.

== See also ==
- Northwestern University Library

== Listen to ==
- Clara, Lu, and Em 1930 audition show
