= Jean-Baptiste André Guillot =

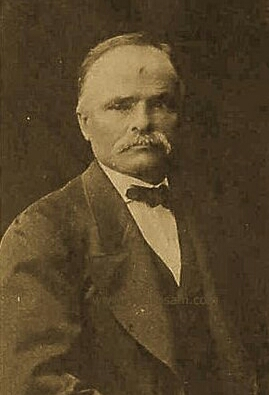
Guillot fils.

Jean-Baptiste André Guillot (9 December 1827 – 6 September 1893) was a nurseryman and rose hybridizer in Lyon, France, son of nurseryman and rose hybridizer Jean-Baptiste Guillot (10 December 1803 – 18 April 1882). Jean-Baptiste the son is known as Guillot Fils, and Jean-Baptiste the elder as Guillot Père. Guillot Fils is best known as the creator of the rose 'La France', considered to be the first hybrid tea rose, introduced in 1867.

== Biography ==
Jean-Baptiste Guillot (Père) opened a rose nursery in the La Guillotière area of Lyon in 1829, and Jean-Baptiste André (Fils) grew up working in the nursery from the age of 14. Guillot Père was the first nurseryman in Lyon to concentrate on the propagation of roses, produced new hybrids himself, and propagated and introduced new hybrids created by others, primarily Hybrid Perpetuals and Teas. Guillot Fils, while working for his father, pioneered the propagation of rose rootstocks from seed rather than cuttings. The roses used for rootstocks at that time were the wild species Rosa canina, the dog rose, and Rosa rubiginosa, the sweetbriar or eglantine.

In 1850, Guillot Fils married Catherine Berton. He started his own nursery in 1852, in the Montplaisir district of Lyon. Their son Pierre Guillot was born on November 13, 1855. Pierre began working in the family business in 1884, under the name Guillot and Son. Pierre took over management in 1892. Guillot Fils was an Honorary Member of the (Royal) National Rose Society in London. One of his roses had been chosen by the Society of Horticulture of Lyon as being worthy of the name 'La France'.

Guillot Fils died in 1893, leaving Pierre in charge of a thriving business with an international reputation.

== Contributions ==
Guillot Fils revolutionized the production of rose rootstocks through the use of seed propagation, rather than rooting cuttings. He created two new classes of roses, the hybrid tea and the polyantha. He created the first Tea rose with anything like a true yellow color, 'Mme. Hoste', which was later used as the pollen parent for the still-popular yellow tea rose 'Lady Hillingdon'. His pink Tea rose 'Catherine Mermet' was a popular florist rose in the late 19th century. His nursery is still in operation in the 21st century, and still hybridizes new rose varieties.

== Partial List of Guillot Père and Fils Cultivars ==
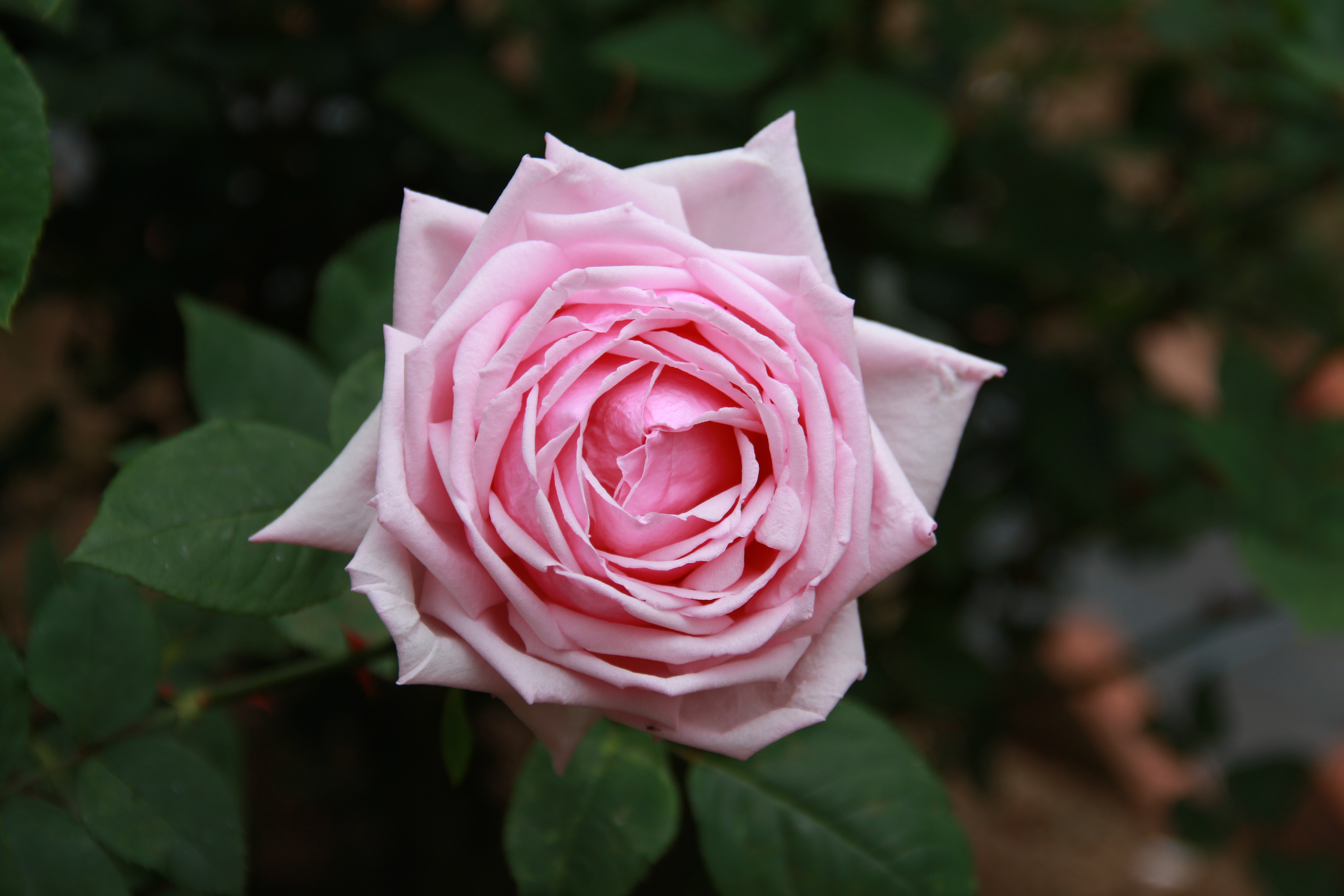
Rosa 'La France'

- 'Mme. Brevy' (1848)
- 'Mme. Falcot' (1858)
- 'Catherine Guillot' (1861)
- 'La France' (1867)
- 'Catherine Mermet' (1869)
- 'Pâquerette' (1875)
- 'Mignonnette' (1880)
- 'Mme. Hoste' (1887)
