= Rosa 'La France' =

Rose cultivar

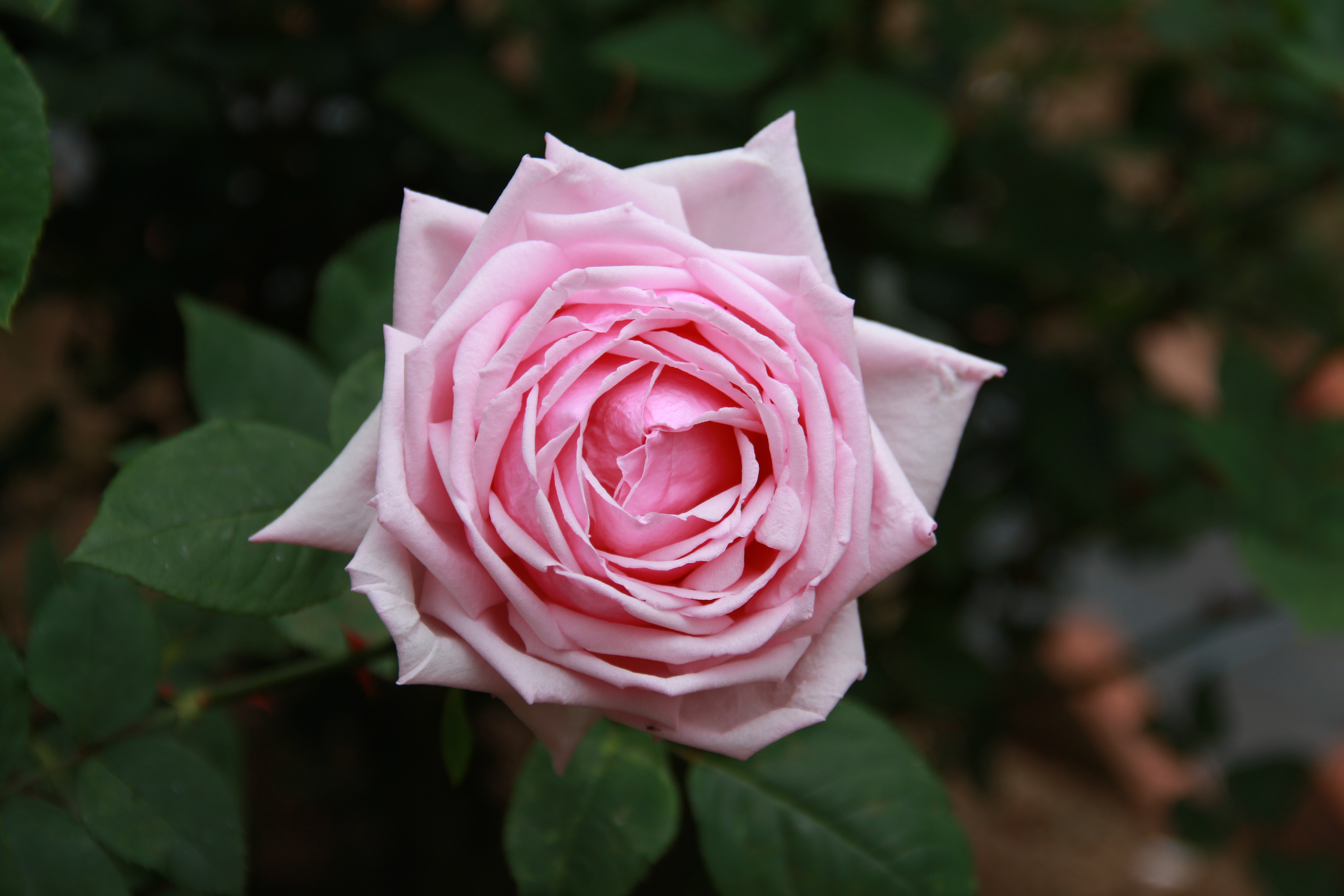
- Genus: Rosa hybrid
- Hybrid parentage: Seedling of 'Madame Falcot' ?
- Cultivar group: Hybrid tea
- Cultivar: 'La France'
- Breeder: Guillot (fils)
- Origin: France, 1867

Rosa 'La France' is a pink rose cultivar found in France in 1867 by the rosarian Jean-Baptiste André Guillot (1827–1893). It is generally accepted to be the first hybrid tea rose (recognised as a class in the 1880s). Its introduction is therefore also considered the birth of the modern rose. As the cultivar was not systematically bred, its hybrid parentage can only be speculated, but 'Madame Falcot' is considered as a possible parent.

'La France' has globular double flowers with slightly rolled outer petals and a strong sweet damask fragrance. The bloom form is high centered with up to 60 petals, that appear messy when fully opened. The flowers develop from long pointed buds and reach an average diameter of 9 cm (3.5 in). Their colour is a light silvery pink, while the reverse is deeper pink with lilac reflexes. The flowers appear solitary or in small clusters on long stems in flushes throughout the season. As the stems are a bit feeble, the flower heads tend to nod.

The plant grows vigorously to about 120 to 150 centimetres (3.9 to 4.9 ft) in height and 90 centimetres (3.0 ft) in width. As the mid green foliage is susceptible to fungi, the cultivar grows better in dry and warm climates or glass houses.
