= Enrico (disambiguation) =

Enrico is a masculine given name of Italian origin. It may also refer to:

== People ==
- Enrico (footballer), Brazilian former footballer Enrico Cardoso Nazaré (born 1984)
- Giovanni Enrico (born 1987), Chilean motorcycle racer
- Robert Enrico (1931–2001), French film director and scriptwriter
- Roger Enrico (1944–2016), American business executive, longtime CEO of PepsiCo

== Other uses ==
- Enrico, an opera by Manfred Trojahn
- Enrico, a junior synonym of the spider genus Eucteniza
- Enrico Biscotti Company, a Pittsburgh bakery

== See also ==
- Enrico IV, a 1921 Italian play
