= Morton Gottlieb =

American theatre producer (1921 – 2009)

Morton Edgar Gottlieb (May 2, 1921 – June 25, 2009) was an American producer of Broadway theatre whose play Sleuth won the Tony Award for Best Play in 1971, in addition to three of his other plays that were nominated for the same award.

== Early life and education ==
Born in Brooklyn on May 2, 1921, Gottlieb attended Erasmus Hall High School and majored in drama at Yale University. Gottlieb got a job with Columbia Pictures after graduating from Yale in 1941. He later became a press agent for actress Gertrude Lawrence. She, in turn, introduced him to producer Gilbert Miller, for whom he worked as a general manager. His initial stage-related work was as company manager or general manager, and his first production role was for a summer stock theatre production of Arms and the Man in 1953 that featured Marlon Brando in his last stage role.

== Theatrical and film production ==
His 1963 production of Joseph Stein's comedy Enter Laughing launched Alan Arkin to fame and ran for 419 performances into the following year. The 1966 Broadway production of the play The Killing of Sister George by Frank Marcus and the 1969 comedy Lovers by Brian Friel and starring Art Carney, were both nominated as Tony Award for Best Play.

Gottlieb achieved theatrical success with the 1970 thriller Sleuth by Anthony Shaffer that ran for three years, winning that year's Tony Award for Best Play. A film adaptation of the play, starring Laurence Olivier and Michael Caine and directed by Joseph L. Mankiewicz debuted in 1972, while the show was still running on Broadway.

Gottlieb's next production, Same Time, Next Year, brought to the Broadway stage Bernard Slade's story of two people, each married to someone else, who meet once a year for a romantic tryst. The play opened in March 1975 with Ellen Burstyn and Charles Grodin and ran on Broadway until September 1978 and was also nominated for a Tony as Best Play, losing to Peter Shaffer's Equus. The play was also adapted into a film of the same name that opened in the play's final year on stage, with Alan Alda playing the film role that Grodin had filled on stage.

Gottlieb was an "old-fashioned producer" who preferred to work with original scripts that he would take to the stage and on to film, focusing on "middlebrow" material. His material had popular appeal, though critics weren't always as appreciative of his work. Brian Friel's 1979 Faith Healer, one of the few exceptions to his middlebrow standards, ran for only 20 performances.

He was known, even considered "notorious" for what The New York Times described as his "professional parsimony", which extended to having staff reuse envelopes. Gottlieb's concern for his investors was such that he was careful to pay his investors back as quickly as possible, extending to his production of the 1978 play Tribute starring Jack Lemmon, for which he was able to distribute checks to investors at the party celebrating opening night, using the proceeds generated from tryouts before opening on Broadway. For the 1985 play ultimately named Dancing in the End Zone by Bill C. Davis, Gottlieb lined up 92 investors. While most producers preferred to have a very small number of large investors, allowing them to avoid Securities and Exchange Commission disclosure rules, Gottlieb felt that "[i]t's fun to have as many people as possible", with a diverse group of investors ranging from stagehands to millionaires, with whom he was happy to disclose details of his prior successes and failures.

Looking back on his career, Gottlieb analyzed Broadway theatre as a profession where it's easiest to start right at the top, noting that "You don't need experience, you don't need a license, you don't need money. All you need is chutzpah. You call all the agents and say, 'Here I am — a producer!'".

== Personal ==
In 1972, Gottlieb bought a set of four interconnected barns in Warren, Connecticut, parts of which dated back to 1769, which he called "Hodgepodge Farm". Many of the home's furnishings were items that had been used on the sets of his theatrical productions that had completed their runs. An upholstered chair was a gift from Gilbert Miller, and had appeared in Gigi in a scene with Audrey Hepburn. Chairs from The Killing of Sister George and a table from Enter Laughing adorned the living room.

Gottlieb died at age 88 on June 25, 2009, in Englewood, New Jersey, due to natural causes. He had never married, and was even honored by a men's toiletries firm as its Bachelor of the Year for 1968. He left no immediate survivors.
