= Romantic Comedy (play) =

1979 play by Canadian playwright Bernard Slade

- Written by: Bernard Slade
- Characters: Phoebe Craddock; Jason Carmichael
- Original language: English
- Subject: Two playwrights collaborate over the course of nine years
- Genre: Romantic comedy

Premiere
- Date premiered: November 8, 1979
- Place premiered: Ethel Barrymore Theatre; New York City

Romantic Comedy is a play by Bernard Slade, author of Same Time, Next Year.

== Overview ==
Phoebe Craddock and Jason Carmichael are playwrights who meet and decide to collaborate just as he is getting married. Their relationship produces first a failure and then a string of successes. Their repartée remains sharp and witty as their unrequited interest in each other gathers energy over a nine-year period, until some resolution finally is in sight.

== Production ==
The play opened on Broadway on November 8, 1979 after 11 previews at the Ethel Barrymore Theatre. It closed on October 18, 1980 after 396 performances. The play was directed by Joseph Hardy, with scenery by Douglas W. Schmidt, costumes by Jane Greenwood, and lighting by Tharon Musser. The original cast included Mia Farrow (Phoebe Craddock), Anthony Perkins (Jason Carmichael), Carole Cook (Blanche Dailey), Holly Palance (Allison St. James), Greg Mullavey (Leo Janowitz), and Deborah May (Kate Mallory). Keith Baxter (Jason Carmichael), Karen Valentine (Phoebe Craddock) and Benay Venuta (Blanche Dailey) were replacements later.

In 1983, Slade adapted his play for a feature film directed by Arthur Hiller. The film starred Dudley Moore and Mary Steenburgen. Earlier that year, the play opened in London at the Apollo Theatre with Tom Conti and Pauline Collins in the leads.

== Reception ==
The New York Post wrote: "A darling of a play...zesty entertainment of cool wit and warm sentiment."

John Simon, reviewing for the New York Magazine, wrote: " Romantic Comedy almost makes up in comedy what it lacks in romance... Mia Farrow is quite good... Anthony Perkins desperately lacks charisma..."
