= Rosemary Prinz =

American actress (born 1931)

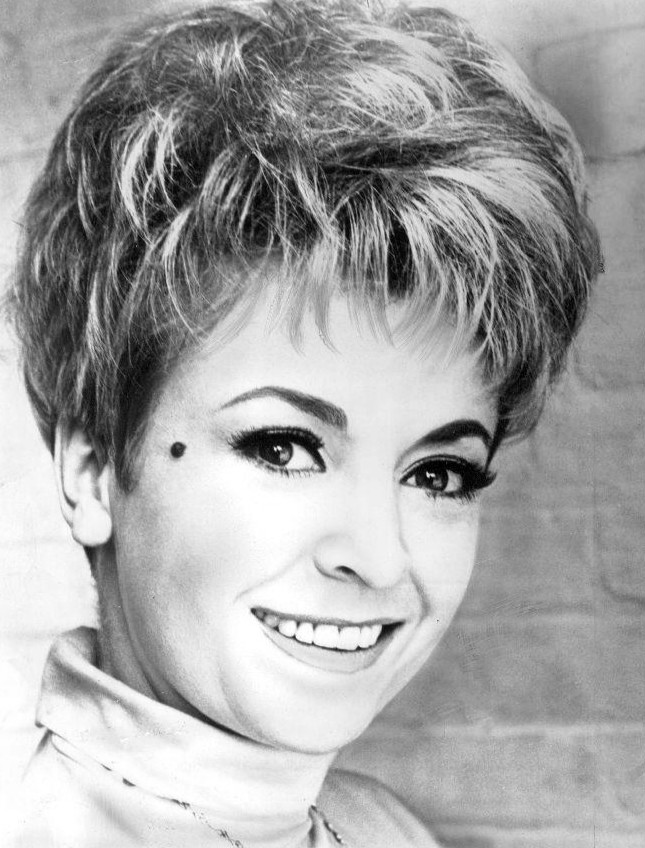
- Prinz in 1970
- Born: January 4, 1931 (age 95); The Bronx, New York, U.S.
- Occupation: Actress
- Years active: 1947–present
- Spouse(s): Michael Thoma (m. 1951–1957; divorced); Joseph Patti (m. 1966-2014; his death)

Rosemary Prinz (born January 4, 1931) is an American actress. She is known for playing the role of Penny Hughes on the CBS soap opera As the World Turns (1956–1968, 1985, 1986–1987, 1998, 2000). She also played Amy on First Love (1954–1955), Amy Tyler on All My Children (1970), and Dr. Julie Franklin on How to Survive a Marriage (1974–1975) . She has performed in many theatrical productions. She appeared on Broadway in The Grey-Eyed People (1952), Tonight in Samarkand (1955), Three Men on a Horse (1969), The Prisoner of Second Avenue (1971), and Tribute (1978). Prinz originated the role of M'Lynn Eatenton in Steel Magnolias during its first production Off-Broadway in 1987.

== Early life ==
Prinz was born in The Bronx, New York. Her father was cellist Milton Prinz, who performed with the NBC Symphony Orchestra and was the founder of the New York String Quartet. Prinz later taped How to Survive a Marriage in the same studio where her father had performed with Arturo Toscanini.

== Career ==
=== 1947–1955: Early work ===
In 1947, at age sixteen, Prinz made her professional acting debut in Dream Girl at the Craigsmoor Summer Theatre. Her father gave her permission to finish high school early. She was cast in a touring production of Joan of Lorraine, co-starring with Diana Barrymore. She later joined touring productions of Kiss and Tell, Glad Tidings, and The Second Man. In 1948, she starred in Cat on a Hot Tin Roof at the Flat Rock Playhouse in North Carolina.

She made her Broadway debut as First Girl Scout in the original production of The Grey-Eyed People, opening on December 17, 1952 at the Martin Beck Theatre. Prinz played Amy on the NBC soap opera First Love from 1954 to 1955. She guest starred on The Mickey Rooney Show. She appeared as Pandore in the original Broadway production of Tonight in Samarkand. The play opened at the Morosco Theatre on February 16, 1955.

=== 1956–1968: As the World Turns ===
She was cast in the contract role of Penny Hughes on the CBS soap opera As the World Turns, appearing in the show's first episode on April 2, 1956. In the beginning, the show taped a half-hour episode live every day. The character of Penny was paired romantically with Jeff Baker (Mark Rydell). They were daytime's first teen romance, breaking up and reuniting many times. The couple finally married and planned to adopt a child. Their storyline ended when Jeff was killed in a car crash and Penny suffered from amnesia.

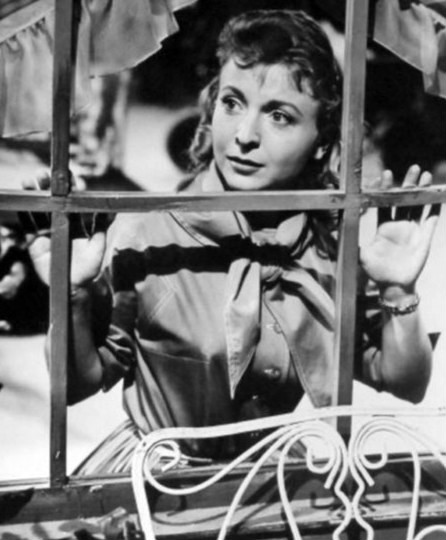
Prinz as Penny Hughes on As the World Turns, 1958.

Prinz sparred with Irna Phillips, the creator and writer of As the World Turns. She has said that Phillips would become angry when she took roles in theatrical productions. She also didn't want her to smoke or drink, because it was something that Penny wouldn't do. Prinz has said, "I was supposed to be Penny all the time."

After the assassination of John F. Kennedy in 1963, ATWT was preempted by news coverage for four days. When the show began airing again, Prinz asked if she could make a reference to it on the air. She was told not to, but she improvised a line anyway, saying "Grandpa, here we are talking about Tommy, and after all the country's been through for the last four days."

From December 1967 to January 1968, Prinz starred in A Girl Could Get Lucky at The Little Theatre on the Square. The stress of working on ATWT and the conflicts with Irna Phillips caused her to have a nervous breakdown. She sought help from a psychoanalyst and decided to leave the show when her contract ended in 1968. Phillips' last revenge on her was to have the character of Penny steal her brother's child and go to England. The role was briefly recast with actress Phoebe Dorin.

=== 1968–1982: All My Children ===
From 1968 to 1969, Prinz played Ella in a touring production of The Apple Tree, co-starring with Tom Ewell. She played Audrey Trowbridge in a Broadway revival of Three Men on a Horse. The play opened at the Lyceum Theatre on October 16, 1969. She returned to television, playing Amy Tyler on the ABC soap opera All My Children. She was an original cast member on the show, which premiered in January 1970. The character was a liberal peace activist. Prinz only agreed to play the role for six months, on the condition that the show's creator, Agnes Nixon, have the character protest the Vietnam War and support Martin Luther King Jr.

In the early 1970s, she appeared in a touring production of Last of the Red Hot Lovers. Prinz played Edna Edison in the original Broadway production of The Prisoner of Second Avenue. She replaced Barbara Barrie in the role. In 1972, she co-starred with Robin Strasser in This Child is Mine, an episode of The ABC Afternoon Playbreak. She played Dr. Julie Franklin on the NBC soap opera How to Survive a Marriage from 1974 to 1975. She starred in Mame at The Little Theatre on the Square in 1974. In 1975, she starred in Gypsy at the same venue.

In December 1977, she starred as Doris in Same Time, Next Year at New York's Studio Arena Theater. Prinz appeared as Maggie Stratton in the original Broadway production of Tribute, co-starring with Jack Lemmon. The play opened at the Brooks Atkinson Theatre on June 1, 1978. She guest starred on Laverne & Shirley, Hart to Hart, and Archie Bunker's Place. Prinz had a recurring role on Knots Landing. She played Maryanne in Amidst the Gladiolas at New York's Lion Theatre in December 1981. In 1982, she played Lady Bracknell in The Importance of Being Earnest at the Sharon Playhouse in Connecticut.

=== 1983–1997: Steel Magnolias ===
In September 1983, she starred as Amanda Wingfield in The Glass Menagerie for The Repertory Theatre of St. Louis. Throughout her career, Prinz has starred in five productions of The Glass Menagerie, including one in Japan. She returned to As the World Turns for a brief appearance in 1985. She then returned for a longer stint, airing from March 29, 1986 until April 1987.

In July 1986, Prinz co-starred with Fannie Flagg in a female version of The Odd Couple at the Westport Country Playhouse. In 1987, she played M'Lynn Eatenton in the original Off-Broadway production of Steel Magnolias. The play had an extended run at the WP Theater and reopened at the Lucille Lortel Theatre during the summer of 1987. In 1988, Prinz returned to television, playing the recurring role of Sister Mary Joel on the ABC soap opera Ryan's Hope.

In the Fall of 1989, she co-starred with Ted Lange in a national tour of Driving Miss Daisy. In April 1990, she played Evelyn in Tales of the Lost Formicans at New York's Apple Corps Theater. Prinz starred in A Perfect Ganesh at Connecticut's TheaterWorks in October and November 1995.

She played Virginia in Three Viewings at TheaterWorks in June 1996. In October 1996, she appeared in Avow at New Jersey's George Street Playhouse. In December 1996 and January 1997, Prinz played Evelyn in On Deaf Ears at the Martin R. Kaufman Theater in New York. She starred as Lola in The Model Apartment at the La Jolla Playhouse in July 1997. In October 1997, she starred as Agnes in A Delicate Balance at Virginia Stage Company in Norfolk, Virginia.

=== 1998–2005: Theater ===
Prinz starred in Last Lists of My Mad Mother at Connecticut's TheaterWorks in January and February 1998. In June 1998, Prinz co-starred with Jon Farris in Love Letters at TheaterWorks. She played Maria Callas in Master Class at Portland Stage Company in August and September 1998. She returned to As the World Turns for a few episodes in August 1998.

She played Maria Callas in Master Class at Connecticut's TheaterWorks in January 2000 and at Florida's Coconut Grove Playhouse in October 2000. Prinz made her film debut in the romantic drama A Wedding for Bella (also titled The Bread, My Sweet), co-starring with Scott Baio. She returned to As the World Turns again on December 26, 2000, making her last appearance before the show came to an end in 2010.

In September 2001, Prinz co-starred with Mia Dillon in Concertina's Rainbow for Connecticut's Fairfield Theatre Company. Performances began soon after the September 11 attacks. From July to August 2002, she co-starred with Laurie Metcalf in Purple Heart for Chicago's Steppenwolf Theatre Company. Prinz starred in Driving Miss Daisy at the Pittsburgh Public Theater in November 2002. In March 2003, she played the title role in Killing Louise at New York's CAP21 Theatre. In February 2005, she starred as Kimberly Levaco in Kimberly Akimbo at Connecticut's TheaterWorks.

=== 2006–present ===
From February to April 2006, Prinz starred in Under the Bed for the Caldwell Theatre Company in Florida. In November 2006, she performed in Romania. Kiss Me!, a collection of six short plays from Romania, at New York's 59E59 Theaters. From August to October 2007, she starred in Driving Miss Daisy at TheaterWorks in Connecticut. She starred in Voices of Swords at Off-Broadway's Urban Stages in June 2008.

Prinz played Mrs. Bramson in Night Must Fall at Maryland's Olney Theatre Center in September and October 2009. In February 2010, she starred as Grandma in Lost in Yonkers at New Jersey's Paper Mill Playhouse. In July 2010, she played Sarah Bernhardt in Memoir for Louisiana's River City Repertory Theatre.

She performed in A Little Journey at New York's Mint Theater Company in June 2011. In May 2012, Prinz appeared Off-Broadway in She's of a Certain Age, co-starring with Robert Newman. In 2014, she starred in 4000 Miles at Cincinnati Playhouse in the Park. She appeared in The Waverly Gallery for the River City Repertory Theatre in 2015. In 2017, she appeared in the comedy film Humor Me. Prinz participated in a live streamed performance of Richard Wilbur's translation of Molière's Tartuffe in July 2020. The cast included Raúl Esparza and Samira Wiley.

== Personal life ==
Prinz was married to actor Michael Thoma from 1951–57. (Thoma died in 1982 at the age of 55.) Her second marriage, to jazz drummer Joseph Patti in 1966, ended only upon his death from natural causes in 2014. A lifelong New Yorker, she is a resident of the Upper West Side.

== Filmography ==
=== Film ===
Year	Title	Role	Notes
2001	A Wedding for Bella	Bella	
2004	Extreme Mom	Grandma	Short film
2017	Humor Me	Gert	

=== Television ===
Year	Title	Role	Notes
1951	Studio One	Connie Nelson	Episode: "The Dangerous Years"
1951	Lights Out	Cora	Episode: "The Silent Supper"
1953	The Plainclothesman		Episode: "The Heavy Foot"
1954	Colonel Humphrey Flack		Episode: "Gambling Fever"
1954–1955	First Love	Amy	Contract role, 388 episodes
1955	Robert Montgomery Presents	Janet Colby	Episode: "Late Love"
1956–1968, 1985, 1986–1987, 1998, 2000	As the World Turns	Penny Hughes	Contract role: 1956–1968, Guest appearances: 1985, 1986–1987 1998, 2000
1970	All My Children	Amy Tyler	Special guest star: 6 months
1972	The ABC Afternoon Playbreak	Elizabeth Thatcher	Episode: "This Child is Mine"
1974–1975	How to Survive a Marriage	Dr. Julie Franklin	Contract role, 333 episodes
1979	Laverne & Shirley	Mrs. Latimer	Episode: "Fat City Holiday"
1979	Salvage 1	Flora	Episodes: "Hard Water: Part 1 & Part 2"
1980	Hart to Hart	Esther Goodman	Episode: "Cruise at Your Own Risk"
1981	Archie Bunker's Place	Gladys	Episode: "Weekend Away"
1981	ABC Afterschool Special	Mrs. Anderson	Episode: "Run, Don't Walk"
1981–1982	Knots Landing	Muriel Warren	3 episodes
1982	One of the Boys	Violet Shields	Episode: "Parents' Weekend"
1988–1989	Ryan's Hope	Sister Mary Joel	3 episodes
