= Romantic Comedy (1983 film) =

1983 film by Arthur Hiller

- Original poster
- Directed by: Arthur Hiller
- Written by: Bernard Slade
- Produced by: Morton Gottlieb; Walter Mirisch
- Starring: Dudley Moore; Mary Steenburgen; Frances Sternhagen; Janet Eilber; Robyn Douglass; Ron Leibman
- Cinematography: David M. Walsh
- Edited by: John C. Howard
- Music by: Marvin Hamlisch
- Production companies: United Artists; Taft Entertainment
- Distributed by: MGM/UA Entertainment Co.
- Release date: October 7, 1983
- Running time: 103 minutes
- Country: United States
- Language: English
- Budget: $10 million
- Box office: $6,857,733

Romantic Comedy is a 1983 American romantic comedy film directed by Arthur Hiller and starring Dudley Moore and Mary Steenburgen. The screenplay by Bernard Slade is based on his 1979 play of the same title.

== Plot ==
Jason Carmichael is a popular New York City playwright in desperate need of a new writing partner who can provide him with inspiration. Phoebe Craddock is a small-town teacher who aspires to be a writer.

On the day Jason is marrying wealthy socialite Allison St. James, he meets Phoebe, stripping naked in front of her when he mistakes her for a masseuse.

The two embark on a professional partnership. Over the course of the next nine years, they produce a string of plays, some flops but mostly hits. They find themselves attracted to each other but manage to avoid becoming involved romantically except for a one-nighter out of town, which the aloof Jason fails to even acknowledge the next morning. As time passes, Jason's marriage suffers as Allison runs for political office.

His agent Blanche remains a constant, mothering presence as years go by. Jason is still a husband and a father while Phoebe remains a close family friend. But he permanently loses the respect of both his wife and writing partner by having a fling with a pushy Hollywood actress, Kate Mallory, as well as changing a new play at her request.

Jason goes to pieces after his wife divorces him while Phoebe marries newspaper reporter Leo Jessup. Phoebe moves away, ends their professional partnership and becomes a successful author. When they are reunited for the first time in years, Jason picks an argument with Phoebe in a restaurant and has a heart attack.

Upon coming home, Jason does everything in his power to sabotage Phoebe's marriage while she moves in to take care of him. Leo can plainly see that his wife is in love with Jason and possibly always has been, so he leaves her. Phoebe ultimately invites Jason to try a new kind of collaboration.

== Cast ==
- Dudley Moore as Jason Kramer
- Mary Steenburgen as Phoebe Craddock
- Frances Sternhagen as Blanche Dailey
- Janet Eilber as Allison St. James
- Robyn Douglass as Kate Mallory
- Ron Leibman as Leo Jessup

== Production ==
The film was shot on location in New York City. Sutton Square, the cul-de-sac at the end of East 58th Street just east of Sutton Place, is used as the exterior location for the home of the lead character.

The song "Maybe" was written by Burt Bacharach, Carole Bayer Sager, and Marvin Hamlisch and performed by Peabo Bryson and Roberta Flack.

== Critical reception ==
Vincent Canby of The New York Times said the film had "remarkably little wit, humor, charm or interest." He added, "Miss Steenburgen is very appealing, suggesting a woman rather like Elaine May, though Miss May wouldn't be caught dead mouthing this dialogue. But Mr. Moore, ordinarily a most winning performer, isn't this time. It's difficult to tell whether the fault is in the material, the production or him."

Roger Ebert of the Chicago Sun-Times rated the film three stars and observed, "Not a whole heck of a lot happens in Romantic Comedy, but it happens so charmingly, and with such quick spirit and wit, that it's enough. This is the kind of movie Hollywood used to make to exploit the sheer charm of its great stars - performers like Cary Grant or Katharine Hepburn, who were so wonderful to watch that all you had to do was find something for them to say. The stars this time are Dudley Moore and Mary Steenburgen. Together, they have the sort of chemistry that might make any dialog work . . . This is a nice movie . . . about smart, witty people who suffer, but not too much, while they work, but not too hard, and break their hearts, but not irreparably. I think you could call it an escapist fantasy."

The movie was reviewed in Leonard Maltin's 2014 Movie Guide, was given 1 1/2 stars, stating "Faithful adaptation of Bernard Slade's paper-thin play looks even worse on screen, despite a perfect cast". On Rotten Tomatoes, the film holds a rating of 29% from 14 reviews.

== DVD release ==
The Region 1 DVD was released on December 26, 2001. The film is in anamorphic widescreen format, with audio tracks and subtitles in English, French, and Spanish.
