= A Wedding for Bella =

2001 film

- A poster bearing the film's previous title: The Bread, My Sweet
- Directed by: Melissa Martin
- Produced by: William C. Hulley; Adrienne Wehr
- Starring: Scott Baio; Kristin Minter; Rosemary Prinz; John Amplas; Zachary Mott
- Cinematography: Mark Knobil
- Release date: 2001
- Running time: 105 min.
- Country: United States
- Language: Italian / English

A Wedding for Bella (formerly titled The Bread, My Sweet) is a 2001 American romantic drama film that told the story of a successful businessman who trades in his single lifestyle to marry the estranged daughter of a terminally ill elderly woman whom he loves like a mother. The marriage is a sham in order to give the elderly woman happiness before her death.

Written and directed by Melissa Martin, the film is set in Pittsburgh's Strip District, an open-air market. Part love-story to the city that serves as its setting, the film is also an homage to the personalities of three people who each had an impact on director Melissa Martin.

Bella, the title character, and her husband, Massimo, are the creative embodiments of an elderly Italian-American couple who owned, and lived above The Enrico Biscotti Company (the real-life Pittsburgh bakery served as an inspiration for the film).

The film was directed by Martin, and starred Scott Baio as a businessman/baker who works with two brothers- one mentally challenged, Rosemary Prinz (as the dying elderly woman), Kristin Minter as Lucca, the estranged daughter, and Shuler Hensley. Then 70 years old, Prinz, a soap opera mainstay, made her feature film debut. This film has been presented at many film festivals across America.
