= Penny Hughes (As the World Turns) =

- As the World Turns character
- Rosemary Prinz as Penny Hughes
- Portrayed by: Rosemary Prinz (1956–68, 1985–2001); Phoebe Dorin (1971)
- Duration: 1956–1968; 1971; 1985–1988; 1993; 1998; 2000–2001
- First appearance: April 2, 1956
- Last appearance: January 4, 2001
- Created by: Irna Phillips
In-universe information
- Other names: Penny Baker; Penny Wade; Penny McGuire; Penny Cunningham
- Occupation: Formerly worked at Wade Book Shop; Writer
- Father: Chris Hughes
- Mother: Nancy Hughes
- Brothers: Donald Hughes; Bob Hughes
- Sisters: Susan Hughes
- Husband: Jeff Baker (1956, 1958–1962); Neil Wade (?–1967); Roy McGuire; Anton Cunningham (1980–????)
- Adoptive children: Amy Lin Cunningham
- Grandfathers: Will Hughes
- Grandmothers: Ma Hughes
- Uncles: John Hughes
- Aunts: Edith Hughes; Pearl
- Nephews: Tom Hughes; Christopher Hughes II; Ryder Hughes (adoptive)
- Nieces: Frannie Hughes; Sabrina Hughes; Christina Hughes

Penny Hughes is a fictional character from the daytime drama As the World Turns. She was one of the show's initial core cast members, and was played by Rosemary Prinz. Prinz herself described the character as "America’s sweetheart at the time".

== Casting ==
Rosemary Prinz originated the role of Penny in the first episode of As the World Turns. Prinz recalled the on-set tension with the show's creator Irna Phillips, who had fired the show's leading cast member Helen Wagner six months into the show because she didn't like the way she poured coffee. "Irna did not like my going out and doing plays," she recalled, "I was twenty-five when I was hired to play Penny. I thought I was going to stay five years at the most. I stayed for twelve. I did the twelve because I still needed to pay for my analysis. After those twelve years, analysis made me as uncrazy as I was going to or wanted to be." Prinz claimed she would often deal Phillips threats back stage. "I would tell [her] I was going to get pregnant." A focal point of Penny's angst was her inability to have children. "I would constantly have to tell Irna that I was Rosemary, not Penny. Penny was a character."

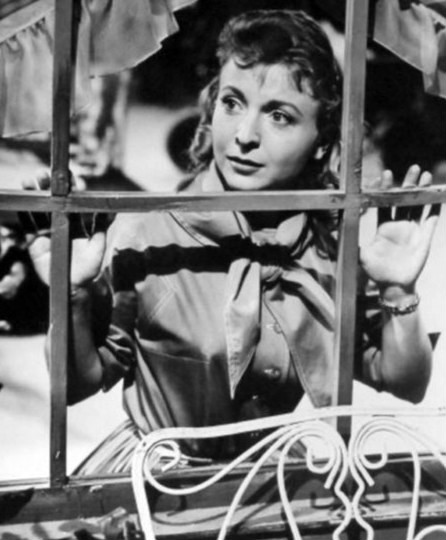
Prinz as Penny in an early As the World Turns promotional shot

Prinz told the New York Post in December 2009 that they recast Penny, however that actress only lasted 13 weeks due to enormous "uproar". Prinz also wanted the show to deal with the death of the country's president John F. Kennedy in 1963. "When Kennedy died, there was four days of complete television coverage, Friday to Monday, and it was just — the nation was in this deep mourning. It was just 9/11, for four days. And when we got back on Tuesday, I said, “We can’t just have a scene without mentioning what we’ve all been through." "They said, 'Oh, no, we can’t do that. Just do the script.' So I started a scene with Grandpa, and of course it’s live, what are they going to do? So I said, 'Grandpa, here we are talking about Tommy, and after all the country’s been through for the last four days.' I got in what I had to say. And then they all rushed down from the control room and I said, 'Oh God, I just said the first thing that came into my head!'" "Irna got even with me in the end. I couldn’t wait for my contract to be over — I paid the analyst, I got un-crazy and I didn’t want to do the show anymore. And so Irna had me steal my brother’s child and go off to England. So this heroine is suddenly doing this terrible thing." "I was supposed to be this monument of goodness."

== Storylines ==
One of the first love stories of the show was that of Penny Hughes and Jeff Baker, often cited as one of the earliest soap supercouples. When they fell in love, Penny's mother, Nancy Hughes disapproved of the relationship. Penny then accused her mother of loving her dead sister, Susan Hughes, more than her. Penny eloped with Jeff and they were going to run away but decided to turn around. Nancy insisted the marriage be annulled.

Al James, one of their classmates, called Penny a tramp and teased Jeff so one day Jeff got into a fight with him and ended up killing him and being charged with murder. Penny started to date Tom Pope and Nancy was happy.

When Tom overheard Jeff declare his love for Penny, Tom left her and she and Jeff got married in a church. Jeff's mother Grace wanted him to resign for the business but when Jeff overheard that he began to drink and left Oakdale and went to another town and assumed the name of Jack Baily.

Penny was saddened by it and Nancy wanted her to divorce Jeff but she wouldn't. Penny and Greg Williams made a date which Meg Blaine overheard and didn't tell her Jeff is in the hospital. Jeff returned to town and Penny was about to divorce him but decided to take him back. They got married again with their parents' blessing but tragedy struck when they got into a car accident which killed Jeff instantly and put Penny into a coma.

As Penny was walking in the park she met a guy named Neil Wade. Neil was really a doctor but didn't want anybody to know that but they soon found out. The accident had left Penny with amnesia. With no memory of who she was, Penny became friends with Neil Wade and started to fall in love with him. Neil was estranged from his mother and Penny felt an urge to help them reconcile. Then, finally, on one stormy night, Penny regained her memory. Realizing that Jeff had been killed in the accident, distraught, Penny ran out into the rain calling his name. After dealing with Jeff's death, Penny soon married Neil. During this time, Neil's family pressured him into returning to medicine. However, the stress of medicine became too much for him and, when he almost lost a patient due to his ineptness, he lashed out at everyone and quit. Finally, he realized that Penny was not the cause of his problems and, with some help from his father, Dr. Doug Cassen, he opened a bookstore. For the next few years the Wades were blissfully happy until Neil's tragic death.

Several years later, Penny found romance again with Roy McGuire, her sister-in-law, Sandy's, ex-husband. When Sandy became ill, Penny helped Roy care for his son, Jimmy. Soon, Penny became attached to Jimmy and convinced Roy to marry her so that they could get custody. Eventually, though Roy decided that Jimmy belonged with his mother and dropped the suit. Realizing that she only married Roy because of Jimmy, Penny had the marriage annulled. Feeling that Oakdale had nothing left to offer, Penny moved to New York City and later England where she met and married Anton Cunningham, a race car driver.

In 1972, Penny sent her adopted daughter, Amy Lin, to stay with Nancy and Chris when she had a major disagreement with Anton. A well-spoken, intelligent young lady, Amy was welcomed warmly by the Hugheses but felt like an outcast with most of the Americans her age. Penny’s nephew, Tom, discovered that Amy's grandmother, Mrs. Parsons, was by coincidence, a resident of Oakdale and a patient of Dr. Rick Ryan's. Mrs. Parsons and her husband were overjoyed to find their granddaughter. However, uncomfortable in her new surroundings, Amy soon returned to Penny and Anton in England.

Penny returned to Oakdale several times in the 1980s, including Bob and Kim's wedding, her parents' 50th anniversary, and her father's funeral. She also returned to visit Oakdale her mother's 80th birthday (during which she uttered the immortal line, "Who are all these people?" when a flock of new characters interrupted Nancy's party). In 2000, Penny returned for a Christmas visit paid for by Emily Stewart, Ellen's granddaughter.
