= Tribute (play) =

1978 play by Canadian playwright Bernard Slade

- Written by: Bernard Slade
- Genre: Drama

Premiere
- Date: June 1, 1978
- Place: Brooks Atkinson Theatre; New York

Tribute is a play by Bernard Slade.

The play focuses on Scottie Templeton, a popular actor who has spent his life shirking responsibility. When he discovers he is terminally ill with leukemia, he attempts to reconnect with his long-estranged son.

== Production ==
The play had pre-Broadway runs in Boston at the Colonial Theatre, and Toronto at the Royal Alexandra Theatre.

The play was loosely inspired by the life of theatrical agent Harvey Orkin, who was a friend of Slade's, who died in 1975.

The play opened on Broadway on June 1, 1978 after 4 previews at the Brooks Atkinson Theatre, and closed on December 2, 1978 after 212 performances. The play was directed by Arthur Storch and starred Jack Lemmon, who had committed to do the play through November 1978. The cast included Robert Picardo, Catherine Hicks, and Rosemary Prinz. Lemmon was nominated for the Tony and Drama Desk Award for his performance.

Before the play opened on Broadway, producer Morton Gottlieb and author Bernard Slade, had sold the movie rights to Paramount for over $1 million. On the opening night party at Tavern on the Green, Gottlieb gave out checks to investors, for payment in full, without help from the movie sale.

In 1980, Slade adapted his play for a feature film directed by Bob Clark, with Lemmon recreating his performance in the lead role. The supporting cast included Robby Benson as Jud Templeton, Lee Remick as Maggie Stratton, Colleen Dewhurst as Gladys Petrelli, John Marley, and Kim Cattrall.
