= How to Survive a Marriage =

American soap opera

- Created by: Anne Howard Bailey
- Developed by: Lin Bolen
- Starring: Rosemary Prinz
- Country of origin: United States
- No. of episodes: 335

Production
- Running time: 30 minutes

Original release
- Network: NBC
- Release: January 7, 1974 – April 17, 1975

How to Survive a Marriage is an American soap opera that aired on the NBC television network from January 7, 1974 to April 18, 1975. The serial was created by Anne Howard Bailey, with much input from then-NBC Vice President Lin Bolen. The show's working title was From This Moment and was an in-house NBC production.

A total of 332 episodes were produced (255 in its first season, and 77 in its final season).

== Synopsis ==
Larry and his wife Christine (nicknamed "Chris," played by Jennifer Harmon) soon divorced and while battling for custody of their daughter Lori, Chris entered the workforce. On Valentine's Day 1975, Chris and Larry remarried, and she then battled alcoholism.

Initially, the show featured veteran soap actress Rosemary Prinz in the role of Dr. Julie Franklin, a staunch feminist who counseled her friends on the joys of being an independent woman, only to decide that her life was truly complete by marrying a man. Prinz only agreed to stay on the show for a short time (as she had with All My Children several years earlier), and earned top billing, a three-day work week, and supposedly $1,000 an episode, which was a big salary for a soap actress to earn in the 1970s. After six months Julie left town to marry Dr. Tony DeAngelo.

Another major story centered on Fran Bachman (Fran Brill) coping with sudden widowhood. Brill received over a thousand letters of condolence from viewers.

== Ratings and cancellation ==
The show did not profit from the large lead-in that Another World provided, mostly due to its many attempts to be socially relevant, which usually took the place of traditional storytelling to which American soap viewers at the time were acclimated. How to Survive a Marriage ran a distant third in the 3:30 p.m. timeslot, behind Match Game 74 on CBS (then daytime television's highest-rated program) and One Life to Live on ABC; a move to 1:30 p.m. on January 6, 1975 after the cancellation of the original version of the game show Jeopardy! (which was done to enable Another World to expand to an hour) only brought worse ratings, as it faced CBS' As the World Turns and ABC's Let's Make a Deal. Despite NBC's high hopes for How to Survive a Marriage, it would only last for sixteen months, ending on a Thursday (the 1:30–3:00 p.m. block on NBC was preempted the following day for a 90-minute special, First Ladies' Diaries: Rachel Jackson). The following Monday, April 21, 1975, Days of Our Lives expanded to an hour and assumed the vacant half hour left in NBC's daytime schedule.

How to Survive a Marriage thus holds a rather dubious distinction as not only a victim of the first daytime soap opera to expand to a full hour, NBC's Another World, but the second one as well, Days of Our Lives. Numerous other existing serials on ABC and CBS would expand to sixty minutes daily over the next five years or so, cutting down on the number of open thirty-minute timeslots available, meaning few if any serials could be launched. This was a strategy employed to minimize risks of new thirty-minute shows like How to Survive a Marriage, failing to develop an audience in a timely enough manner to suit the networks and advertisers. Several other serials had been canceled over the previous several years due to that issue, including its two predecessors, Bright Promise and Return to Peyton Place. However ABC was later successful with Ryan's Hope, Loving, as well as The Edge of Night (which moved to ABC after being cancelled by CBS to allow As the World Turns to expand to an hour in December 1975). All three shows held their own as half hour soaps until they were eventually cancelled. However, both ABC & NBC aired new half hour soaps in the 1990's, like NBC's Generations, who lasted two years (1989–1991) before being canceled, while ABC's Loving spin-off The City aired from 1995 to 1997, being replaced by General Hospital spin-off Port Charles, which fared better, lasting six years from 1997 to 2003. CBS however was successful with The Bold and the Beautiful, which is still airing today, as the only remaining half-hour soap on daytime television, airing since March 1987.

== Cast ==
Fran Brill is now best-known for her work on Sesame Street, where she performed Muppet characters, including Zoe and Prairie Dawn, from 1970 to 2014.

Other cast members included Ken Kercheval (Larry Kirby #2), F. Murray Abraham (Joshua Browne), Armand Assante (Johnny McGhee), and Brad Davis (Alexander Kronos).

== Awards and nominations ==
The serial won Best Sequence at the third annual Afternoon TV Writers & Editors Awards, for "The Death of David Bachman." Fran Brill also won an award from the Afternoon TV Writers & Editors for her portrayal of Fran Bachman during the same award-winning sequence.
