= Same Time, Next Year (film) =

1978 film by Robert Mulligan

- Theatrical release poster
- Directed by: Robert Mulligan
- Screenplay by: Bernard Slade
- Based on: Same Time, Next Year by Bernard Slade
- Produced by: Walter Mirisch; Morton Gottlieb
- Starring: Ellen Burstyn; Alan Alda
- Cinematography: Robert Surtees
- Edited by: Sheldon Kahn
- Music by: Marvin Hamlisch
- Production company: The Mirisch Company
- Distributed by: Universal Pictures
- Release date: November 22, 1978
- Running time: 119 minutes
- Country: United States
- Language: English
- Box office: $23 million

Same Time, Next Year is a 1978 American romantic comedy drama film directed by Robert Mulligan. The screenplay by Bernard Slade is based on his 1975 play. The film stars Alan Alda and Ellen Burstyn (the latter reprising her Broadway role).

== Plot ==
In 1951, at an inn on the Mendocino County coast, Doris, a 24-year-old housewife from Oakland, meets George, a 27-year-old accountant from New Jersey at dinner. They have a sexual tryst, and despite the fact that both are happily married with six children between them, agree to meet every year at the same hotel for one weekend together.

The film jumps forward 5 years at a time, episodically chronicling their time together, the changes each goes through, their respective marriages, and their deepening connection. In 1966, for example, George, now middle-aged and dressed in a suit, is shocked when Doris arrives in denim and wearing her hair to her waist, having enrolled in UC Berkeley and become ardently leftwing. George, meanwhile, reveals his newfound conservatism as a result of his son's having been killed in Vietnam the previous year.

At their meeting in 1977, George tells Doris that his wife, Helen, died unexpectedly earlier in the year, and that Helen revealed to a friend that she had known of the affair for ten years, but never told George she knew. Now a widower, George proposes to Doris, who refuses to accept because of her loyalty to, and respect for, her husband. Dejected, George leaves, but quickly returns, and they promise to continue the affair as long as they are able.

== Production ==
The film is structured as six episodes, each occurring approximately five years apart. Between the scenes (entr'acte) are shown a series of photos (montage) that depict cultural and political events that had ensued in the years between each segment, such as Harry S. Truman, Nikita Khrushchev, Lucille Ball, Elvis Presley, and John F. Kennedy. The episodes are period-specific, often making references to what was actually happening during the time portrayed. For example, in the segment set in 1966, Doris is caught up in the protest movement at Berkeley, while George takes a Librium and reveals that he had voted for Barry Goldwater, and later that his son had been killed in Vietnam.

The original 1975 play used tape montages (speeches, songs, sports broadcasts) between the six scenes. The Philadelphia Lantern Theater Company incorporated different photo and music montages of social events 1951-1984 instead of 1951–1977 in the movie.

Exteriors for the film were shot at the Heritage House Inn, a well-known resort and bed & breakfast in Little River, California, 7 mi (11 km) south of Mendocino, California. The shell of the cottage was built on a temporary foundation overlooking the Pacific Ocean, but the interior was filmed on the Universal Studios sound stage in Los Angeles. After filming was completed, Universal paid for the shell to be relocated to a permanent foundation and the interior was outfitted with the studio furnishings. The cottage became a popular romantic getaway, so popular that the Heritage House eventually partitioned the cottage in half and added a second bathroom to the opposite end. One half of the cottage was called "Same Time" and the other half called "Next Year". The Heritage House closed due to foreclosure in December 2008. The cottage still stands, updated and remodeled, and the Heritage House reopened in 2013.

== Theme song ==
Paul McCartney had composed a title song for the film, which he recorded with Wings, that was not used. He later released it as the B-side of a single in 1990. The theme song ultimately used was "The Last Time I Felt Like This," written by Marvin Hamlisch and Alan and Marilyn Bergman (eventually nominated for the Academy Award for Best Original Song) and performed by Johnny Mathis and Jane Olivor.

== Critical reception ==
While Bernard Slade's acclaimed stage play earned a storm of praise, the film received mixed reviews. Janet Maslin of The New York Times wrote,

"Mr. Slade's screenplay isn't often funny, and it's full of momentous events that can't be laughed away... As directed by Robert Mulligan... Same Time, Next Year is both less and more than it could have been. By moving the action outdoors once in a while, or into the inn's restaurant, Mr. Mulligan loses the element of claustrophobia that might have taken an audience's mind off the screenplay's troubles. But he substitutes the serenity of a California coastal setting, and gives the film a visual glamour that is mercifully distracting. Mr. Mulligan seems to have been more interested in sprucing up the material than in preserving its absolute integrity, and under the circumstances, his approach makes sense... Mr. Alda isn't terribly playful, and he reads every line as if it were part of a joke, which only accentuates the flatness of the script. Miss Burstyn, on the other hand... brings so much sweetness to Doris's various incarnations that the character very nearly comes to life."

On Rotten Tomatoes, the film has an aggregate score of 40% based on 2 positive and 3 negative critic reviews.

Variety called the film "a textbook example of how to successfully transport a stage play to the big screen" and added, "The production of Bernard Slade's play, sensitively directed by Robert Mulligan, is everything you'd want from this kind of film. And it features two first class performances by Ellen Burstyn and Alan Alda."

== Accolades ==
Award	Category	Recipient	Result	Ref.
Academy Awards	Best Actress	Ellen Burstyn	Nominated	
Academy Awards	Best Adapted Screenplay	Bernard Slade	Nominated	
Academy Awards	Best Cinematography	Robert Surtees	Nominated	
Academy Awards	Best Original Song	"The Last Time I Felt Like This"; Music by Marvin Hamlisch; Lyrics by Alan and Marilyn Bergman	Nominated	
Golden Globe Awards	Best Actor in a Motion Picture – Musical or Comedy	Alan Alda	Nominated	
Golden Globe Awards	Best Actress in a Motion Picture – Musical or Comedy	Ellen Burstyn	Won (Note: Tied with Maggie Smith for California Suite.)	
Golden Globe Awards	Best Original Song	"The Last Time I Felt Like This"; Music by Marvin Hamlisch; Lyrics by Alan and Marilyn Bergman	Nominated	
Writers Guild of America Awards	Best Comedy – Adapted from Another Medium	Bernard Slade	Nominated	

The film is recognized by American Film Institute in these lists:

- 2002: AFI's 100 Years...100 Passions – nominated

== See also ==
- Avanti! - 1972 comedy film by Billy Wilder with the similar idea of married lovers meeting secretly once a year in an hotel in Italy, and later their children.
- One Day - Film with similar plot form, two characters meeting over the course of many years.
