= Carole Cook =

American actress (1924–2023)

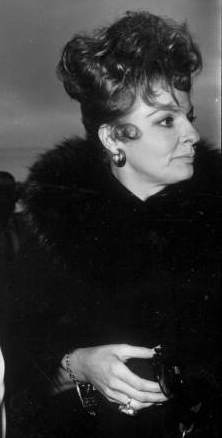
- Attending the premiere of The Incredible Mr. Limpet in 1964
- Born: Mildred Frances Cook; January 14, 1924; Abilene, Texas, U.S.
- Died: January 11, 2023 (aged 98); Beverly Hills, California, U.S.
- Occupation: Actress
- Years active: 1954–2018
- Spouse: Tom Troupe (m. 1964)

Mildred Frances Cook (January 14, 1924 – January 11, 2023), known professionally as Carole Cook, was an American actress, active on screen and stage, best known for appearances on Lucille Ball's comedy television series The Lucy Show and Here's Lucy.

Her best known film roles include The Incredible Mr. Limpet, American Gigolo and Sixteen Candles.

== Biography ==
=== Early life ===
Mildred Frances Cook was born on January 14, 1924, in Abilene, Texas, one of four children of Leland Preston (L.P.) Cook Sr. and his wife, Maudine. She studied Greek drama at Baylor University. After graduating in 1945, she worked in regional theater. By 1954, she had moved to New York, where she made her theatrical debut.

Lucille Ball, having recently seen her success in a stage production of Annie Get Your Gun, invited her to work for her production company Desilu Studios and changed her stage name to Carole, after her favourite actress Carole Lombard.

=== Film and television ===
She appeared in such feature films as Palm Springs Weekend (1963), The Incredible Mr. Limpet (1964), The Gauntlet (1977), American Gigolo (1980), Summer Lovers (1982), Sixteen Candles (1984), and Grandview, U.S.A. (1984).

Her appearance in The Gauntlet was a small role near the beginning as a sassy waitress who has a brief, but funny, conversation with Clint Eastwood while he's sitting at a bar.

She made guest appearances on such television shows as The Lucy Show, Here's Lucy, Darkroom, Knight Rider, Emergency!, Magnum, P.I., McMillan and Wife, Murder, She Wrote, Dynasty, Charlie's Angels, Cagney & Lacey, Grey's Anatomy, and a starring role in a Season 4 episode of Hart to Hart.

Cook starred in the animated Walt Disney Pictures film Home on the Range voicing Pearl Gesner.

=== Theatre ===
In addition to her film and television work, Cook appeared in the original Broadway productions of 42nd Street and Romantic Comedy, and was the second actress (after Carol Channing) to star as Dolly Levi in Hello, Dolly!

She made her theatrical debut playing Mrs. Peacham in the 1956 off-Broadway production of The Threepenny Opera, starring Lotte Lenya.

In 2024, parts of Carole Cook's life and career were celebrated in the stage production Carole Cook Died for My Sins starring Mason McCulley. LA Weekly described the show as “a heartfelt tribute” that explored themes of love, loss, and transformation while honoring Cook's enduring legacy.

== Personal life and death ==
She was married to actor and writer Tom Troupe from 1964 until her death. Lucille Ball was her matron of honor.

Cook died from heart failure in Beverly Hills, California, on January 11, 2023, three days before her 99th birthday.

== Controversy ==
On September 9, 2018, a reporter from TMZ approached Cook outside a restaurant to ask her opinion about an actor who grabbed a Trump 2020 sign from someone who had held it up in the audience during a performance of the musical Frozen. She replied "Where's John Wilkes Booth when you need him?" Someone off camera questioned "So we need to kill President Trump?", to which she replied "Why not?" Cook's comment received widespread attention and criticism.

== Filmography ==
=== Film ===
Year	Title	Role	Notes
1963	Palm Springs Weekend	Naomi Yates	
1964	The Incredible Mr. Limpet	Bessie Limpet	
1977	The Gauntlet	Waitress	
1980	American Gigolo	Mrs. Dobrun	
1982	Summer Lovers	Barbara Foster	
1984	Sixteen Candles	Helen	
1984	Grandview, U.S.A.	Betty Welles	
1996	Fast Money	Ester	
1999	Lost & Found	Sylvia	
2004	Home on the Range	Pearl Gesner	Voice
2017	A Very Sordid Wedding	Hortense	
2018	Waiting in the Wings: Still Waiting	Erika Ericson	

=== Television ===
Year	Title	Role	Notes
1959–1960	U.S. Marshal	Mrs. Parker / Nurse	2 episodes
1963	The Many Loves of Dobie Gillis	Fifi LaVerne / Molly O'Day	2 episodes
1963–1968	The Lucy Show	Thelma Green / Woman in Station (uncredited) / Hotel Guest / Mrs. Valance / Lady at the Health Club / Mrs. Baldwin / Lady Cynthia (voice) / Carrie / Effie Higgins / Piano Bar Patron (uncredited) / Gladys	18 episodes
1964	The New Phil Silvers Show	Gertrude / Mrs. Kerrigan	2 episodes
1964	Kentucky Jones	Dodie Wipple	Episode: "The Dread Disease"
1966	Vacation Playhouse	Nurse	Episode: "The Hoofer"
1966	Daniel Boone	Annie Boyd	Episode: "The Symbol"
1969	My World and Welcome to It	Aunt Kate	Episode: "The Disenchanted"
1969	That Girl	Dorothy Desmond	Episode: "My Part Belongs to Daddy"
1969–1974	Here's Lucy	Second Woman / Mrs. Sheila Casten / Lillian Rylander / Ma Parker / Cynthia Duncan	5 episodes
1971	Sarge	Cass	Episode: "Identity Crisis"
1972–1974	McMillan & Wife	Marnie / Carole Crenshaw	4 episodes
1973	Lady Luck	Fran	Television film
1974	Maude	Marta	Episode: "Walter's Ex"
1975	Baretta	Mrs. Marriott	Episode: "Woman in the Harbor"
1975–1976	Chico and the Man	Flora	3 episodes
1976	Ellery Queen	Gossip Columnist	Episode: "The Adventure of the Sinister Scenario"
1976	Emergency!	Nurse	Episode: "The Nuisance"
1976	Bronk	Beatrice	Episode: "The Vigilante"
1976–1977	Charlie's Angels	Madam Dorian / Hildy Slater	2 episodes
1977	Starsky & Hutch	Scorchy	Episode: "Huggy Bear and the Turkey"
1977	In the Glitter Palace	Daisy Dolon	Television film
1977	Kojak	Marie Stella	4 episodes
1979	Rendezvous Hotel	Lucille Greenwood	Television film
1980	Make Me an Offer	Pru Babcock	Television film
1981	Darkroom	Sally Anne	Episode: "The Partnership"
1982	Laverne & Shirley	Mrs. Harmon	Episode: "I Do, I Don't"
1982	Strike Force	Mitzi	Episode: "The John Killer"
1982	Trapper John, M.D.	Natasha	Episode: "The Object of My Affliction"
1982	Knight Rider	Sen. Maggie Flynn	Episode: "Just My Bill"
1982	Something So Right	Cahuenga	Television film
1982	Hart to Hart	Christine Garrick	Episode: "One Hart Too Many"
1982	CBS Children's Mystery Theatre	Florence Dumont	Episode: "The Zertigo Diamond Caper"
1983	The Love Boat	Phyllis Faraday	Episode: "Paroled to Love / First Impressions / Love Finds Florence Nightingale"
1983	Quincy, M.E.	Winslow	2 episodes
1983	Now We're Cookin'	Marge	Television film
1983–1984	Capitol	Sugar Laine	
1985, 1988	Murder, She Wrote	Christine Carpenter / Shayna Grant	2 episodes
1986	The A-Team	Mrs. Prescott	Episode: "Members Only"
1986	Magnum, P.I.	Sarah Tate	Episode: "All Thieves on Deck"
1986–1988	Cagney & Lacey	Donna LaMarr	5 episodes
1986–1987	Dynasty	Cora Van Husen	4 episodes
1987	Carly's Web	Myrtle	Television film
1990	A Family for Joe	Medium	Episode: "The Medium"
1993	Gloria Vane	Mona Lewis	Television film
2000	Strip Mall	Doreen Krudup	Episode: "Burbank Bigfoot"
2006	Grey's Anatomy	Sophie Larson	Episode: "Tell Me Sweet Little Lies"
2014	Major Crimes	Marcella Brewster	Episode: "Frozen Assets"
2015, 2018	Break a Hip	Pearl Goodfish	3 episodes

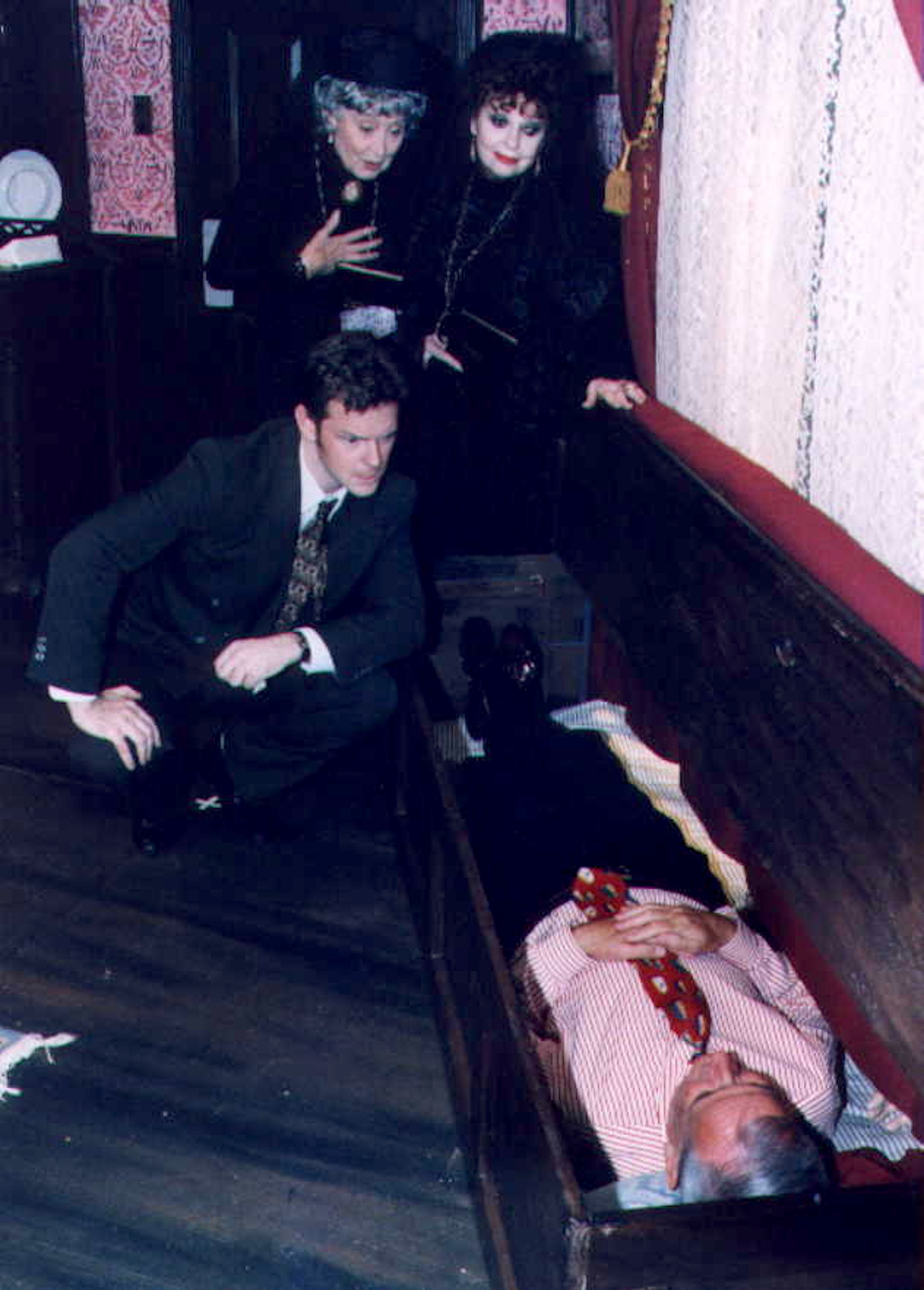
Betty Garrett, Carole Cook and Michael Lee Stever in Arsenic and Old Lace

=== Theatre ===
Year	Play	Role	Venue	Ref.
1956	The Threepenny Opera	Mrs. Peacham	Off-Broadway, New York City	
1960	Kismet	The Melody Tent, Pittsburgh		
1961	Parade	Performer	Hollywood Theatre Center, Los Angeles, CA	
1961	The Matchmaker	Dolly Levi	Dallas Theatre Center, Dallas, Texas and Tour of Texas	
1965–1966	Hello, Dolly!	Dolly Levi	Her Majesty's Theatre, Sydney; Her Majesty's Theatre, Melbourne; His Majesty's Theatre, Auckland	
1964	Stop the World – I Want to Get Off	Evie		
1974, 1978	Father's Day	Louise	Huntington Hartford Theatre, Los Angeles (1974); Total Theatre, Melbourne; Mayfair Theatre, Sydney	
1979–1980	Romantic Comedy	Blanche Dailey	Broadway, New York	
1980–1984	42nd Street	Maggie Jones	Broadway; US Tour (1984), Tokyo, Japan	
1981	Patio/Porch	Pearl	Dallas, Texas with Tom Troupe	
1982	The Supporting Cast		Huntington Hartford Theatre, Los Angeles, Summer Tour Also with Barbara Rush and Sandy Dennis	
1988–1989	Steel Magnolias	Ouiser Boudreaux	Pasadena Playhouse, Pasadena; John F. Kennedy Center for the Performing Arts, Washington, D.C. National Tour With Barbara Rush, June Lockhart, and Marion Ross	
1992; 2007	Dress Up	Herself	Pasadena Playhouse, Pasadena (1992); New Conservatory Theatre Center, San Francisco (2007)	
1994	The Lion in Winter	Eleanor	Pasadena Playhouse, Pasadena	
1995	Ladies in Retirement	Leonora Fiske	Coconut Grove Playhouse, Miami	
1996	Radio Gals	Hazel C. Hunt	John Houseman Theatre, New York	
1998	Arsenic and Old Lace	Aunt Martha	Oklahoma City, Oklahoma with Betty Garrett	
2002	Follies	Hattie Walker	Wadsworth Theatre, Los Angeles	
2006	70, Girls, 70	Gert Appleby	New York City Center, New York	
