= Tom Troupe =

American actor and writer (1928–2025)

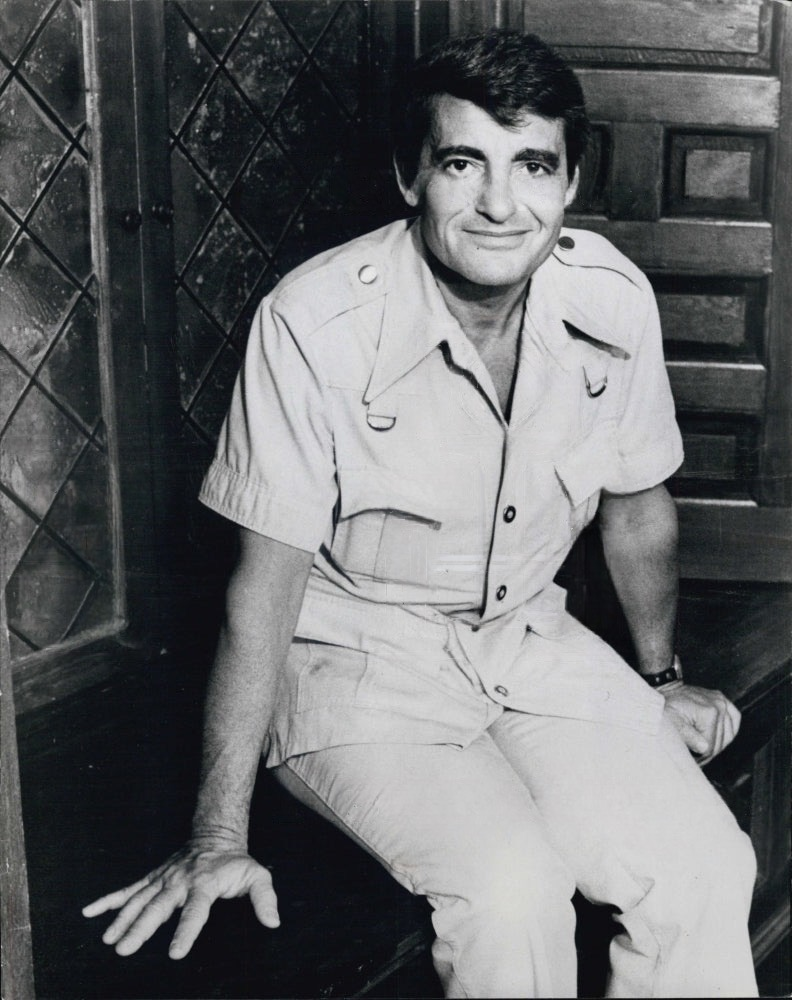
- Troupe in 1977
- Born: Thomas Troupe; July 15, 1928; North Kansas City, Missouri, U.S.
- Died: July 20, 2025 (aged 97); Beverly Hills, California, U.S.
- Occupation: Actor
- Years active: 1957–2025
- Spouse: Carole Cook (m. 1964; died 2023)

Thomas Troupe (July 15, 1928 – July 20, 2025) was an American actor and writer.

== Life and career ==
Troupe was born in 1928 and grew up in North Kansas City, Missouri. Troupe served in the Korean War and was awarded a Bronze Star medal. He studied with Uta Hagen at the Herbert Berghof Studio in Manhattan during the early 1950s. He made his Broadway debut in 1957 as Peter in the original Broadway production of The Diary of Anne Frank, which starred Joseph Schildkraut and Gusti Huber.

Primarily a stage performer, Troupe appeared in many plays over the years, including The Lion in Winter, The Gin Game, and Father's Day. He and his wife, Carole Cook, were jointly honored with the 2002 L.A. Ovation Award for Career Achievements. He appeared in supporting roles in such feature films as The Devil's Brigade (1968), Kelly's Heroes (1970), and My Own Private Idaho (1991).

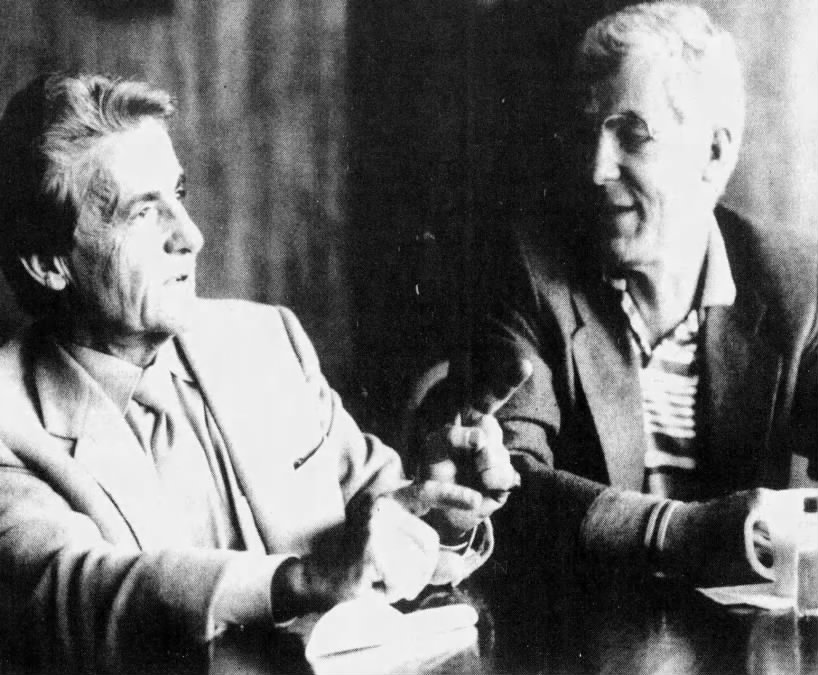
Troupe (left) with Don Eitner, 1986

Troupe co-founded The Faculty (a Los Angeles acting school) with Charles Nelson Reilly. Troupe was married to actress Carole Cook from 1964 until her death in 2023. Troupe died at his home in Beverly Hills on July 20, 2025, at the age of 97.

== Partial filmography or television ==
Year	Title	Role	Notes
1959	The Big Fisherman	James	
1967	Star Trek	Lieutenant Harold	Season 1 Episode 18: "Arena"
1967	Mission: Impossible	David Day	Season 1 Episode 23: "Action"
1968	Sofi	The Clerk	
1968	The Devil's Brigade	Private Al Manella	
1969	Che!	Felipe Muñoz	
1970	Kelly's Heroes	Corporal Job	
1971	Night Gallery	Pierce	(Season 1 episode "Clean Kills and Other Trophies")
1971	Making It	Dr. Shurtleff	
1979	CHiPS	Darrell Justin	(Season 2, episode 16 "Pressure Point")
1980	PSI Factor		
1986	Cheers	Judge William E. Grey	1 episode
1987	Summer School	Judge	
1991	My Own Private Idaho	Jack Favor	
