= Bernard Slade =

Canadian screenwriter (1930–2019)

- Born: Bernard Slade Newbound; May 2, 1930; St. Catharines, Ontario, Canada
- Died: October 30, 2019 (aged 89); Beverly Hills, California, U.S.
- Occupations: Screenwriter, playwright
- Years active: 1960–2018
- Notable work: Same Time, Next Year, The Flying Nun, The Partridge Family
- Spouse: Jill Foster (1953–2017; her death)

Bernard Slade Newbound (May 2, 1930 – October 30, 2019) was a Canadian playwright and screenwriter. As a screenwriter, he created the sitcoms The Flying Nun and The Partridge Family. As a playwright, he wrote Same Time, Next Year, Tribute, and Romantic Comedy and their film adaptations.

He received a Tony Award nomination for Same Time, Next Year, and an Oscar nomination for the screen adaptation.

== Early years ==
Slade was born in St. Catharines, Ontario in May 1930, the son of Bessie Harriet (Walbourne) and Frederick Newbound. Slade moved to England with his family at age five. After he returned to Canada, he worked as a steward on Trans Canada Airlines for a while before he went into acting as a career.

== Career ==
Slade began his career as an actor in repertory theatre in England. He also acted with the Garden Center Theatre in Vineland, Ontario. In the mid-1960s, he relocated to Hollywood and began to work at Screen Gems as a writer for television sitcoms, including Bewitched (including the 7th episode, "The Witches Are Out," which introduced Aunt Clara). When ABC gave him the opportunity to create a series, he devised Love on a Rooftop, similar in theme to Neil Simon's Barefoot in the Park, about a young couple living in a windowless walk-up apartment with access to a rooftop with a view of San Francisco.

The following year, Slade developed The Flying Nun (adapted from Tere Rios' book, The Fifteenth Pelican), with Sally Field as a young novice whose habit's headgear enabled her to fly. After briefly leaving Screen Gems to work as a script supervisor on The Courtship of Eddie's Father for Metro-Goldwyn-Mayer, he came back to Screen Gems to create The Partridge Family, based on the real-life Cowsills, and Bridget Loves Bernie, inspired by the play Abie's Irish Rose. He also wrote the script to the 1972 Columbia Pictures film Stand Up and Be Counted, directed by Jackie Cooper and starring Jacqueline Bisset, in which the Helen Reddy song "I Am Woman" was first introduced. The last show he created for Screen Gems before it changed its name to Columbia Pictures Television was The Girl with Something Extra.

Despite his success in television, Slade returned to the theater in 1975 with his play Same Time, Next Year, about a couple who are married to others but meet once-a-year for sex and conversation. With Charles Grodin and Ellen Burstyn in the leads, the play was a major hit and ran for 1,453 performances. Slade received the Drama Desk Award and a Tony Award nomination for Best Play.

In 1978, he followed with Tribute, the story of a man who learns to love his father, a successful actor who always had more time for his theatrical cohorts than his son. Even with Jack Lemmon heading the cast, it proved to be far less successful than its predecessor, closing after 212 performances. Slightly more successful was Romantic Comedy (1979), starring Anthony Perkins and Mia Farrow. Slade wrote the screenplays for the film versions of all three plays, and was nominated for an Oscar for his screen adaptation of Same Time, Next Year.

== Book ==
Slade wrote an autobiography, Shared Laughter, published by Key Porter Books.

== Personal life ==
Slade was married to actress Jill Foster from July 25, 1953 until her death on March 24, 2017. They had two children: Laurie Newbound and Christopher Newbound. Slade died from Lewy body dementia at his home in Beverly Hills, California, on October 30, 2019, at the age of 89.

== Film ==
- Stand Up and Be Counted (1972)
- Same Time, Next Year (1978)
- Tribute (1980)
- Romantic Comedy (1983)

== Television ==
- My Living Doll (1964, additional dialogue on 1 episode)
- Bewitched (1964–1968, writer of 17 episodes)
- Love on a Rooftop (1966–1967, creator and writer of 14 episodes)
- The Flying Nun (1967–1970, creator and writer of 7 episodes)
- The Courtship of Eddie's Father (1969–1970, script consultant)
- The Partridge Family (1970–1974, creator and writer of 10 episodes)
- Bridget Loves Bernie (1972–1973, creator and writer of 3 episodes)
- The Girl with Something Extra (1973–1974, creator and writer of 4 episodes)
- Ernie, Madge and Artie (1974 TV-movie, writer)
- Good Heavens (1976, writer of 1 episode)

== Theatre ==
- Simon Says Get Married (1961)
- Same Time, Next Year (1975)
- Tribute (1978)
- Romantic Comedy (1980)
- Special Occasions (1982)
- Fatal Attraction (1984)
- Sweet William (1987) later titled An Act of the Imagination
- Same Time, Another Year (1996) Sequel to Same Time, Next Year
