= Enrico Biscotti Company =

Bakery and restaurant in Pittsburgh

Enrico Biscotti

Restaurant information
- Owner: Larry Lagattuta
- Location: 2022 Penn Avenue, Pittsburgh, Pennsylvania
- Website: enricobiscotti.com

Enrico Biscotti Company is a bakery and restaurant in Pittsburgh. The main location is in the Strip District neighborhood. The main product is biscotti. It was featured in the film The Bread, My Sweet, a film by the then-wife of owner Larry Lagattuta and also on Food Network.

Lagattuta founded Enrico Biscotti bakery, featuring bread and biscotti, in 1993. He had previously been an account executive with Lucent Technologies. A few years later, the offerings were expanded to include pizzas and cappuccino. Owner Lagattuta offers an occasional class in bread baking.

In 2003, a second location was opened in Shadyside neighborhood. Unlike the original bakery/cafe, the Shadyside location is more of a restaurant.

In 2010, a third location opened in Highland Park neighborhood. The unintentional grand opening occurred during the February 9–10, 2010, North American blizzard, with the cafe serving as a soup kitchen for the snowed-in neighbors.

== Gallery ==
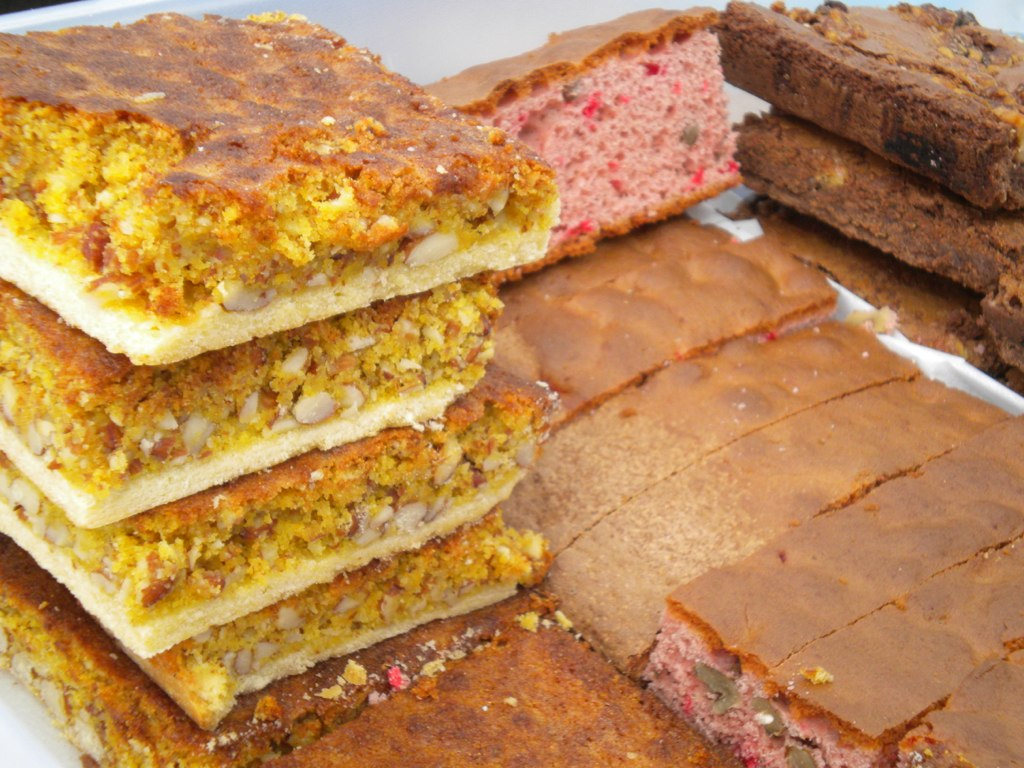
Soft biscotti from Enrico Biscotti Company for sale at East Liberty farmers' market

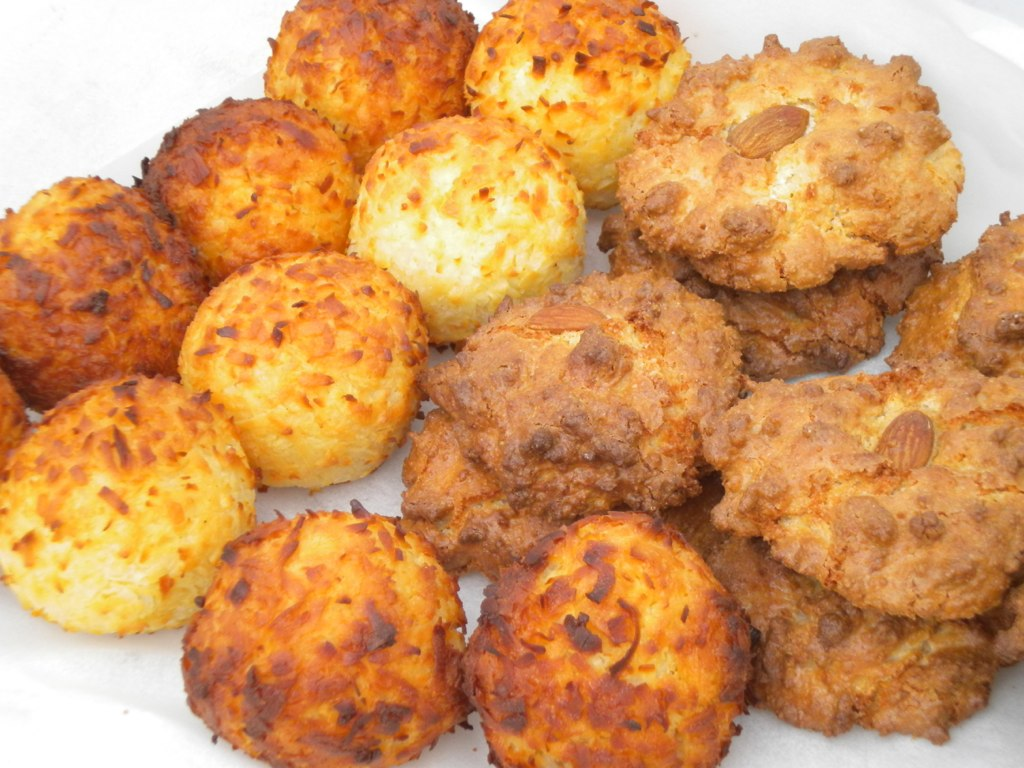
Macaroons from Enrico Biscotti Company for sale at East Liberty farmers' market

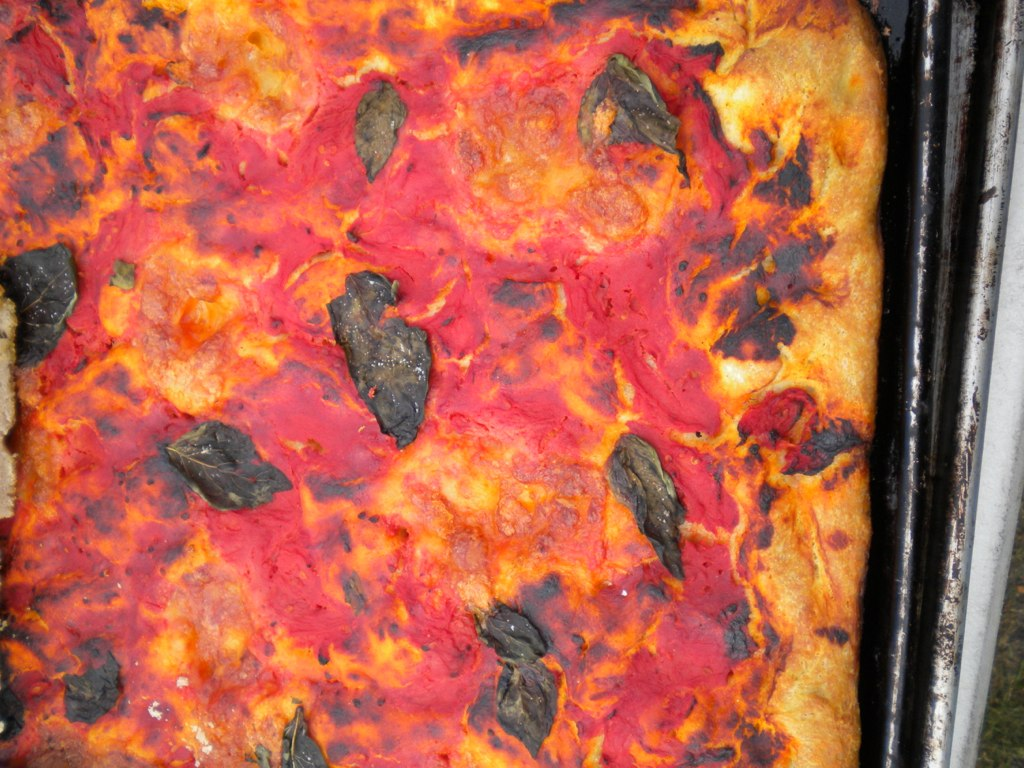
Focaccia from Enrico Biscotti Company for sale at East Liberty farmers' market
