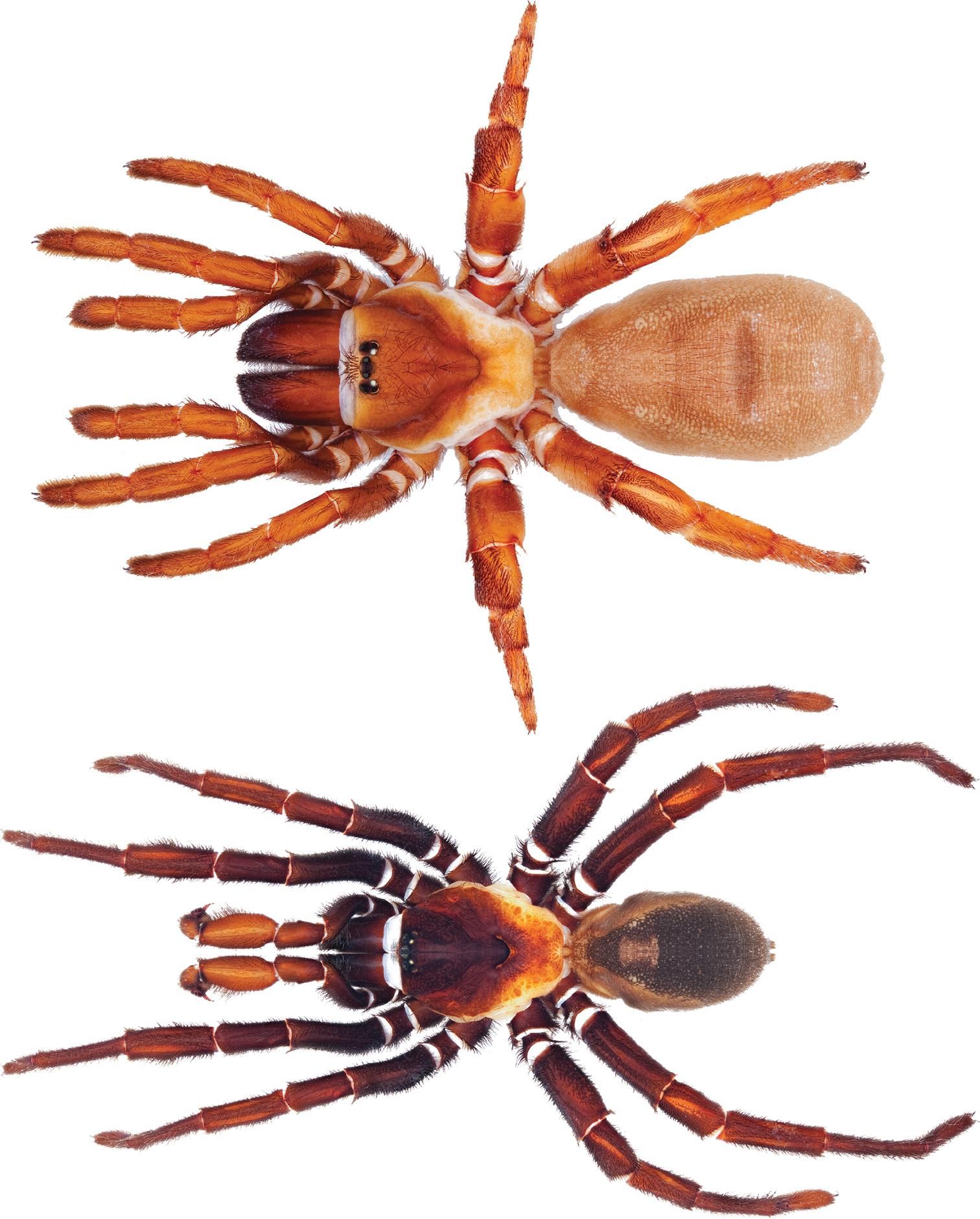
- Eucteniza relata, female (top) and male

Scientific classification
- Kingdom: Animalia
- Phylum: Arthropoda
- Subphylum: Chelicerata
- Class: Arachnida
- Order: Araneae
- Infraorder: Mygalomorphae
- Family: Euctenizidae
- Genus: Eucteniza; Ausserer, 1875

Type species
- Eucteniza mexicana Ausserer, 1875

Diversity
- 14 species
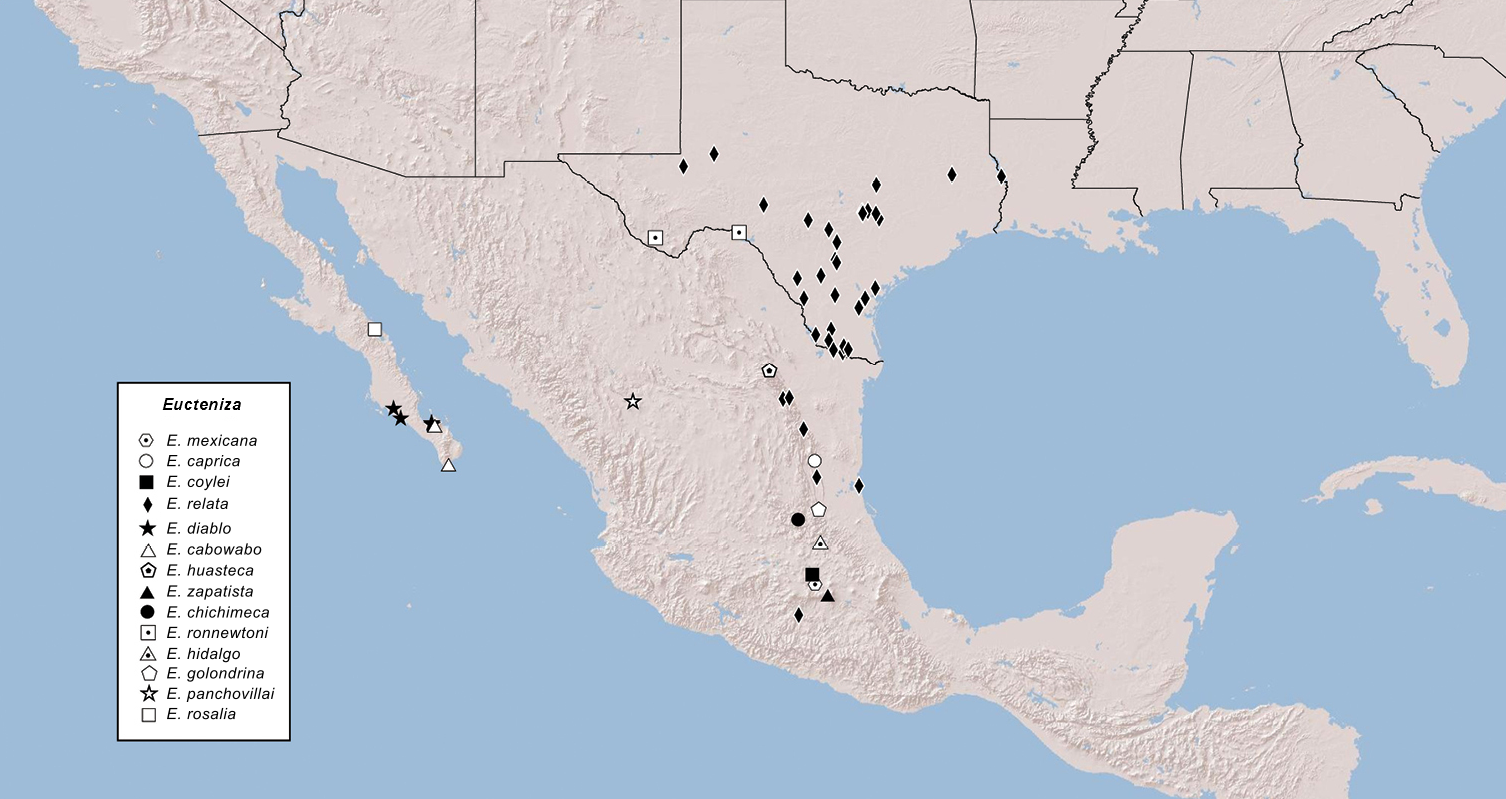
- Eucteniza species in North America

Synonyms
- Favila O.P.-Cambridge, 1895; Enrico O.P.-Cambridge, 1895; Astrosoga Chamberlin, 1940

= Eucteniza =

Genus of spiders

Eucteniza ( /juːktəˈnaɪzə/ yook-tə-NY-zə) is a genus of trapdoor spiders in the family Euctenizidae containing at least 14 species occurring in Mexico and the southern United States. Species are distinguished by a softened rear portion of the carapace, and males possess large spines on the first two pairs of walking legs that are used to hold females during mating. Like other trapdoor spiders they create burrows with a hinged lid, from which they await passing insects and other arthropods to prey upon. Many species are known from only one or two localities, or from only male specimens. More species are expected to be discovered. Eucteniza is closely related to spiders of the genera Entychides and Neoapachella.

== Description ==
Members of Eucteniza reach up to 27.5 mm (1.08 in) in body length (not including the legs), which is relatively large to very large among spiders. The cephalothorax (the anterior body segment bearing the eyes, mouthparts, and legs) is oval, slightly longer than wide, and slopes considerably towards the rear when viewed from the side. The rear third of the carapace (the upper surface of the cephalothorax) is relatively soft, and is distinctly lighter in coloration. The carapace is often devoid of hairs, and in some species fringed with black bristles. The eight eyes are not elevated and are arranged in two rows in a rectangular area: the hind row is recurved, or slightly curved upwards (as in a bowl or shallow U), while the anterior row is slightly procurved (slightly curved downwards, as in an inverted bowl). Eucteniza spiders are colored in various shades of brown, with males generally appearing a dark reddish brown. The jaws (chelicerae) are dark brown. The abdomen sometimes has a dark brown blotch on the upper surface. Measurements of most species only refer to the cephalothorax, which is less variable than the abdomen: recorded cephalothorax lengths range from 3.5 mm (0.14 in) in E. huasteca to 11.5 mm (0.45 in) in E. relata.

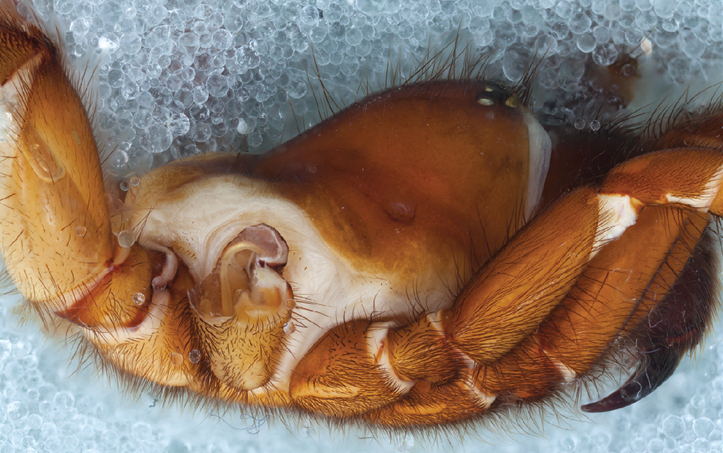
Side view of cephalothorax, third leg removed

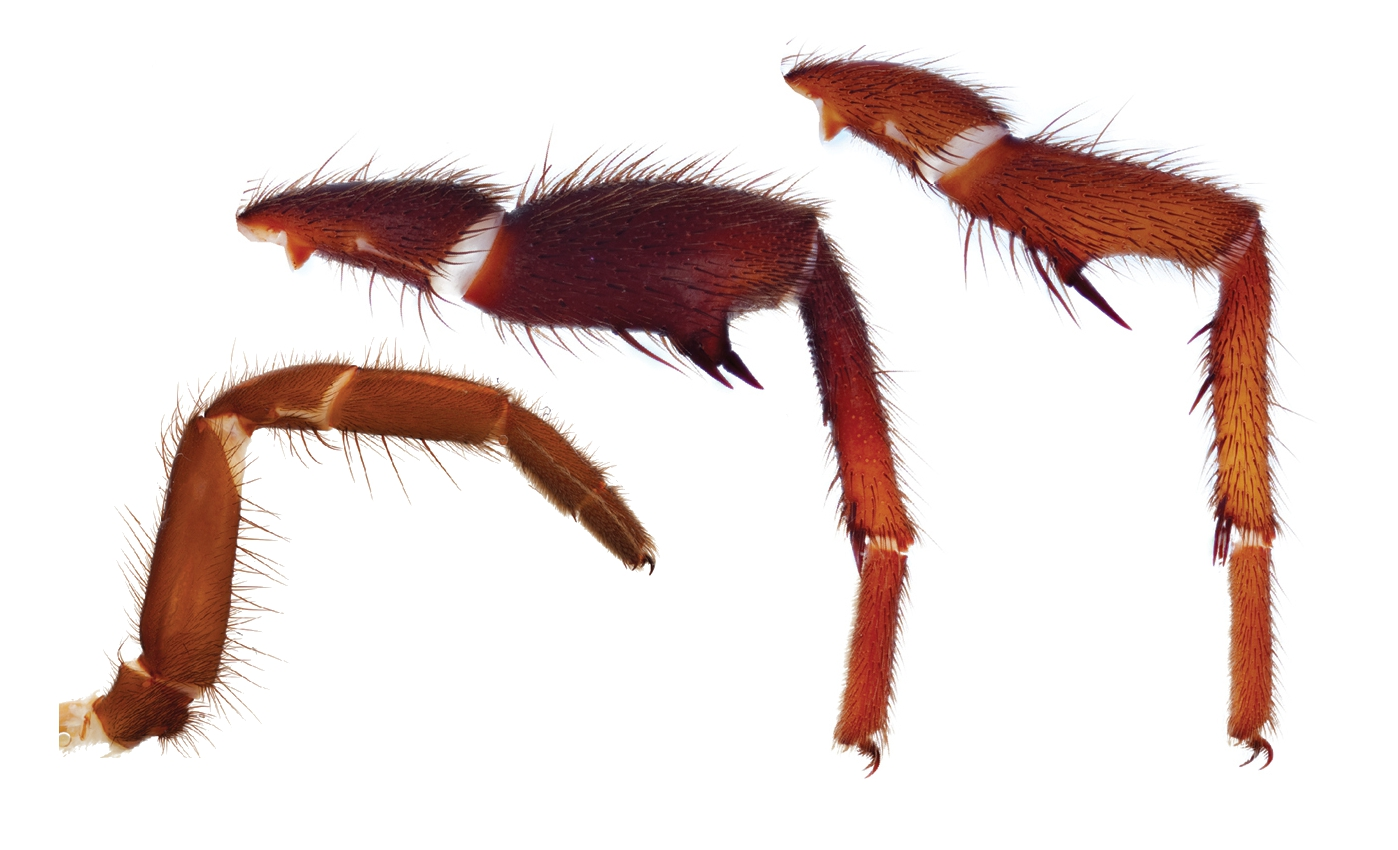
Female leg 1 (left), and male legs 1 and 2 with tibial mating claspers

In males, the tibiae (5th leg segments) of the first and second walking legs are swollen or enlarged in many species. Additionally, males possess one or two prominent spines, known as "mating claspers" on the first and second tibiae; related genera possess claspers on the first pair of legs only. The size, number, and arrangement of these spines varies between species. Females have a double-toothed groove that the fangs recede into, unlike that of any other euctenizid genus. Both sexes also possess "preening combs", rows of stiff bristles on the rear legs.

== Behavior ==
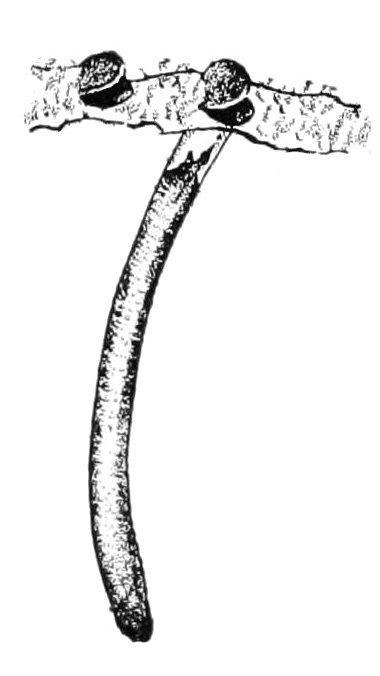
Eucteniza relata builds un-branched wafer-lid burrows.

Like other trapdoor spiders, Eucteniza species construct burrows in the ground with a hinged lid, from which they wait to ambush passing prey. Burrows and prey have been studied in E. relata, and other species are believed to have similar behavior. The burrow consists of an un-branched tube, lined with silk and soil, ranging from 7 to 25 cm (2.8 to 9.8 in) in depth. The burrow is covered with a cork-like lid composed of silk and soil and hinged with silk. The bottom of the burrow accumulates molted exoskeletons and remains of prey, which include beetles, ants, and millipedes. Burrows of adults and juveniles have been found in close proximity, suggesting individuals do not disperse very far after hatching. Individuals in Texas disperse from their burrows between August and January, and hence are most often collected during this time. In Mexico, the dispersal period extends from June to January.

== Habitat ==
The predominant habitat of Eucteniza is desert and tropical dry forest of Mexico and Texas. Specimens have been collected from elevations as low as 8 to 12 m (26 to 39 ft) above sea level (e.g. the Baja California species E. cabowabo, E. diablo, and E. rosalia), to around 3,300 m (10,800 ft) (E. relata in northeastern Mexico). Burrows are located on flat ground or slight inclines. In southern Texas, E. relata may burrow in residential lawns, and may be particularly likely to be encountered after rains. Eucteniza spiders are generally difficult to find in the wild, and are rare in museum collections.

== Predators ==
E. relata in Texas is thought to be preyed upon by tarantula hawk wasps in the genus Pepsis, which are known to paralyze tarantulas and other spiders to provide food for their young. Observations suggest female Pepsis seek out Eucteniza hosts and sting them in their burrows, leaving them paralyzed within.

== Taxonomy ==
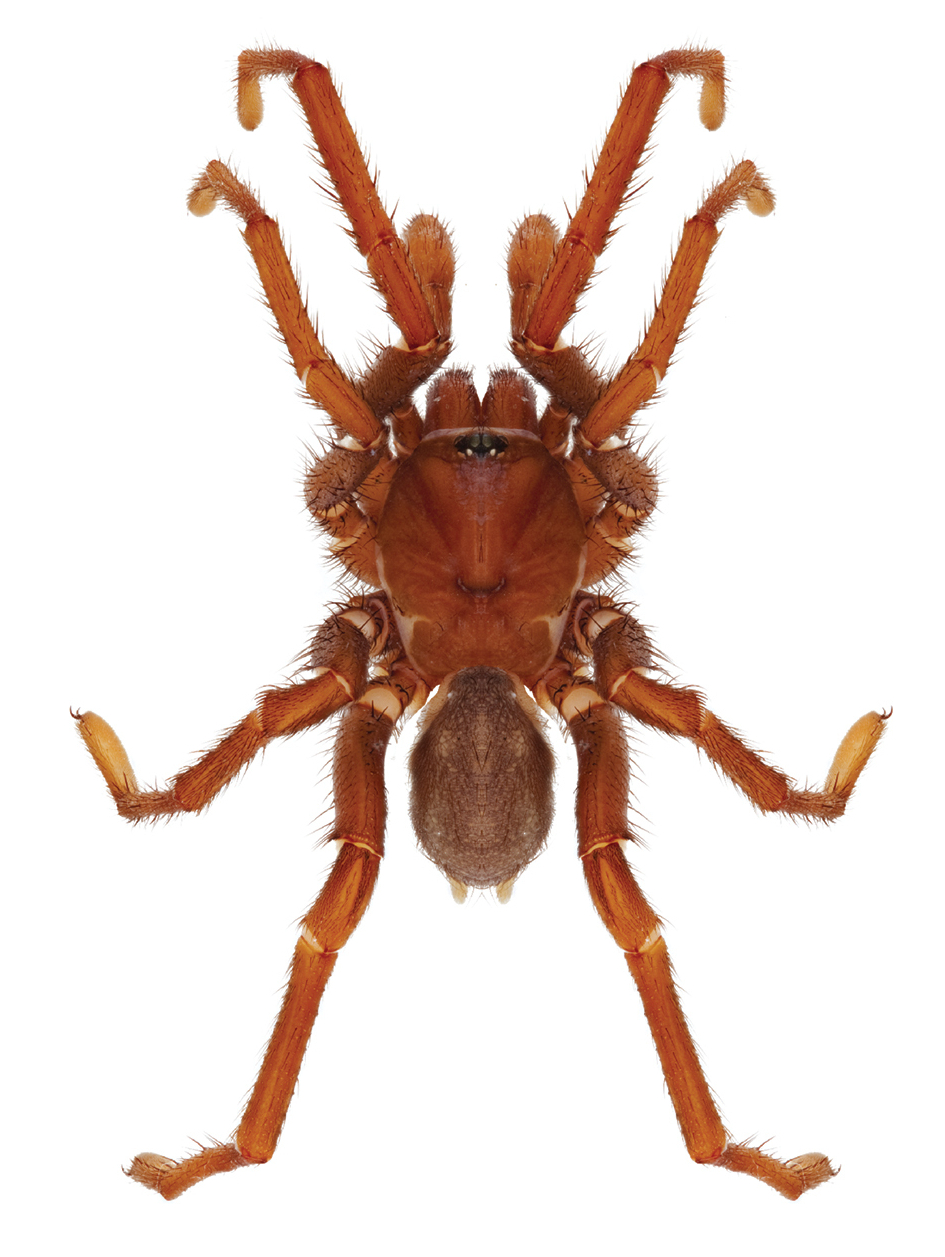
E. cabowabo, male, native to Baja California Sur

The taxonomic history of Eucteniza spiders includes nearly 20 named species and four genera; the three additional generic names are now considered taxonomic synonyms of Eucteniza, and several named species have similarly been determined to be synonyms of previously described species.

The genus Eucteniza was established by Austrian naturalist Anton Ausserer in 1875 with the description of Eucteniza mexicana. In 1895, the English zoologist and reverend Octavius Pickard-Cambridge described the new genera Favila (Note: Favila was named after a Gothic duke. The original spelling by O. P.-Cambridge is "Favila", but was spelled "Flavila" in Bond & Opell, 2002, and Bond & Godwin, 2013; and "Favilla" in the online World Spider Catalog, version 16, accessed on 19 April 2015) and Enrico (Note: Named after a Gothic ruler) for the new species relatus and mexicanus, respectively. Shortly thereafter, the reverend's nephew Frederick O. Pickard-Cambridge transferred F. relatus to Eucteniza, rendering Favila a junior synonym of Eucteniza. Similarly, the elder Pickard-Cambridge's Enrico mexicanus was synonymized with Eucteniza in 2002, which required a name change to avoid confusion with Ausserer's Eucteniza mexicana. Thus Enrico mexicanus was given the replacement name Eucteniza atoyacensis.

In 1940, the American biologist Ralph V. Chamberlin described Astrosoga rex, a new genus and species from Texas, while Willis J. Gertsch and Stanley Mulaik described A. stolida, also from Texas. Both species of Astrosoga were transferred to Eucteniza in 2002.

Many taxonomic changes occurred in a 2013 revision by American biologists Jason Bond and Rebecca Godwin. Twelve new species were described, many named after nearby localities, indigenous peoples, or Mexican historic figures. Namesakes of other species include the nightclub Cabo Wabo of Cabo San Lucas, and a character from Battlestar Galactica. Both E. rex and E. stolida were synonymized with E. relata, and the previously described E. atoyacensis (Pickard-Cambridge's Enrico mexicanus) was declared a dubious name: since it was originally described based on a juvenile specimen, it is unclear whether it represents a distinct species. Thus, as of 2013 a total of 14 valid species are recognized.

=== Species and distribution ===
The different species of Eucteniza are distinguished by differences in body size, limb proportions, number of tibial spines, and shape of female sperm receptacles, as well as geographic location. Most species are known from male specimens only, but E. rosalia and E. panchovillai are known only from female specimens. Eucteniza species are distributed throughout central and northern Mexico, much of Texas, and the lower part of the Baja Peninsula. Many species are only known from the type locality, the site where the type specimen or specimens were originally collected. The species with the largest range is E. relata, although Bond and Godwin assert the species is actually composed of multiple as-yet-unnamed cryptic species (distinct species erroneously grouped into one) that will require additional morphological or genetic research to distinguish.

Species	Geographic range T denotes only known from type locality. Source: Bond & Godwin 2013 unless otherwise noted	Etymology Source: Bond & Godwin 2013 unless otherwise noted.
Eucteniza cabowabo Bond & Godwin, 2013	La Paz and Los Cabos municipalities, Baja California Sur	Named for the restaurant Cabo Wabo in Cabo San Lucas, Mexico.
Eucteniza caprica Bond & Godwin, 2013	Tamaulipas, Mexico^{T}	Named "in reference to the humanoid cylon model Caprica 6", a character from the 2004 Battlestar Galactica television series.
Eucteniza chichimeca Bond & Godwin, 2013	Querétaro, Mexico^{T}	Named for the indigenous Chichimeca Jonaz people.
Eucteniza coylei Bond & Godwin, 2013	Morelos, Mexico^{T}	Named for arachnologist Fred Coyle who collected the type specimen.
Eucteniza diablo Bond & Godwin, 2013	La Paz Municipality, Baja California Sur	Named for Picacho del Diablo, the highest peak in Baja.
Eucteniza golondrina Bond & Godwin, 2013	Sótano de las Golondrinas, San Luis Potosí, Mexico^{T}	Named for the type locality.
Eucteniza hidalgo Bond & Godwin, 2013	Hidalgo, Mexico^{T}	Named for the type locality, and for the Spanish word for noble or nobleman.
Eucteniza huasteca Bond & Godwin, 2013	La Huasteca Canyon, Nueva Leon, Mexico^{T}	Named for the type locality.
Eucteniza mexicana Ausserer, 1875	Known only from a specimen from Mexico City and the holotype, whose locality is simply "Mexico".	Not originally specified. Mexicanus is Latin, meaning Mexican.
Eucteniza panchovillai Bond & Godwin, 2013	San Juan del Rio, Durango, Mexico^{T}	Named for Mexican revolutionary Pancho Villa, who was born in San Juan del Rio.
Eucteniza relata (O. Pickard-Cambridge, 1895)	Throughout northern and central Mexico, well into central Texas.	Not originally specified. Relatus is Latin, meaning returned or reported.
Eucteniza ronnewtoni Bond & Godwin, 2013	Val Verde and Brewster counties, Texas	Named for Texas biologist Ronald Newton.
Eucteniza rosalia Bond & Godwin, 2013	Mulegé, Baja California Sur, Mexico^{T}	Named for the Río de Santa Rosalía (Santa Rosalia River)
Eucteniza zapatista Bond & Godwin, 2013	Paso de Cortes, Puebla, Mexico^{T}	Named for the Zapatistas, members of Mexico's Liberation Army of the South.

=== Classification ===
Eucteniza is the type genus of the family Euctenizidae (the "wafer trapdoor spiders"), a mygalomorph family formerly considered a subfamily of the Cyrtaucheniidae. Within Euctenizidae, Eucteniza is classified in the subfamily Euctenizinae. Earlier comparisons of morphological and behavioral traits suggested the closest relative of Eucteniza is Neoapachella rothi, a forest dwelling spider found in Arizona and New Mexico, while more recent studies, including analyses of DNA similarities, suggest a closer relationship to Entychides, a genus with several species ranging from Arizona to Texas into Mexico.
