= Same Time, Next Year (play) =

Romantic comedy

- Original language: English
- Written by: Bernard Slade
- Characters: Doris, George
- Subject: An extramarital affair conducted one day each year for 24 years.
- Genre: Romantic comedy
- Setting: A California seaside cottage One day in February 1951, 1956, 1961, 1965, 1970, and 1975.

Premiere
- Date: March 13, 1975
- Place: Brooks Atkinson Theatre; New York City

Same Time, Next Year is a 1975 romantic comedy play by Bernard Slade. The plot focuses on two people, married to others, who meet for a romantic tryst once a year for two dozen years.

== Plot ==
New Jersey accountant George Peters and Oakland housewife Doris meet at a Northern California inn in February 1951. They have an affair, and agree to meet once a year, despite the fact both are married to others and have six children between them.

There are six scenes over the course of the next 24 years which develop an emotional intimacy deeper than what one would expect to find between two people meeting for a clandestine relationship just once a year. During the time they spend with each other, they discuss the births, deaths, and marital problems each is experiencing at home, while they adapt themselves to the social changes affecting their lives. Between the six scenes are tapes (speeches, songs, sports broadcasts) of that time period that have affected the characters.

== Productions ==
The Broadway production opened on March 14, 1975, at the Brooks Atkinson Theatre with Ellen Burstyn as Doris and Charles Grodin as George and direction by Gene Saks. It transferred to the Ambassador Theatre on May 16, 1978 and remained there until it closed on September 3 the same year. It played a total of 1,453 performances during its run.

Burstyn and Grodin both gave their last performances on October 18, 1975. They were succeeded by Joyce Van Patten and Conrad Janis, who lasted through Nov. 29, 1975, before headlining the show's first national tour, which lasted from December 2, 1975 through May 8, 1976. Next up were Loretta Swit and Ted Bessell, who began their run on December 2, 1975. While Swit's last performance was on June 19, 1976, Bessell continued with the play until March 6, 1977. His next leading lady was Sandy Dennis, who began her run on June 21, 1976 and lasted until May 29, 1977. By the time Dennis' run was complete, she was acting opposite Don Murray, who joined the play on March 8, 1977, and lasted until January 1, 1978. Following Dennis was Hope Lange, whose run spanned May 31 to October 22, 1977. After Lange came Betsy Palmer, who played Doris from October 24, 1977 until the September 3, 1978 closing date. In addition to Murray, Palmer acted opposite Monte Markham from January 3 to July 6, 1978, and Charles Kimbrough from July 7 to September 3, 1978.

A second national tour, spanning August 3, 1976 through January 28, 1978, and including a six-month engagement in Chicago, starred Barbara Rush and Tom Troupe. A Los Angeles production from April 12, 1977 to July 2, 1977 was first headlined by Carol Burnett and Dick Van Dyke, then Diahann Carroll and Cleavon Little. Finally, a bus and truck tour from January 13, 1978 to April 22, 1978 starred Kathryn Crosby and Tony Russel.

The original London production opened in 1976, starring Michael Crawford and Frances Cuka at the Prince of Wales Theatre.

== Reception ==
The New York Times critic Clive Barnes wrote: "Do not put off till tomorrow what you can do today. Get tickets for Same Time, Next Year... It is the funniest comedy about love and adultery to come Broadway's way in years."

Author Bernard Slade was surprised by the play's international popularity. "I felt I was writing a fantasy. Then I started to get letters from people that had had this sort of relationship....The curious thing is how successful it was in other countries. I saw the French production, the Spanish production. In France--where how excited could they get about an extramarital affair?--the only thing they didn't quite understand were the psychiatric references."

== Awards and nominations ==
=== Original Broadway production ===
Year	Award	Category	Nominee	Result
1975	Tony Award	Best Play		Nominated
1975	Tony Award	Best Actress in a Play	Ellen Burstyn	Won
1975	Tony Award	Best Direction of a Play	Gene Saks	Nominated
1975	Drama Desk Award	Outstanding New Play (American)		Won
1975	Drama Desk Award	Outstanding Actor in a Play	Charles Grodin	Nominated
1975	Drama Desk Award	Outstanding Actress in a Play	Ellen Burstyn	Won
1975	Drama Desk Award	Outstanding Director of a Play	Gene Saks	Nominated
1975	Outer Critics Circle Award	Outstanding Ensemble Performance	Charles Grodin and Ellen Burstyn	Won

== Film adaptations ==
A 1978 film adaptation directed by Robert Mulligan starred Ellen Burstyn and Alan Alda. The Philadelphia Lantern Theater Company incorporated different photo and music montages of social events 1951-1984 instead of 1951-1977 in the movie.

The play also served as the basis for I for You, a 1994 film directed by Hong Kong filmmaker Clifton Ko.

It also served as a basis for the German TV drama Jedes Jahr im Juni.

== Musical Adaptation ==
A stage musical version of the story was written by Slade, with music and lyrics by Stan Daniels. The musical has been titled Same Time Next Year: The Musical and Every Time I See You. A demo recording was released featuring Debbie Gravitte as Doris by Footlight Records. The show had its world premiere in 1999 at the National Theatre in Budapest.In 2013, the show was performed Off-Broadway at the Musicals Tonight! new musical showcase.

== Sequel ==
A two-act sequel, Same Time, Another Year, was first produced in 1996 at the Pasadena Playhouse, directed by the author and starring Nancy Dussault and Tom Troupe. It opens on the couple's 25th anniversary in 1976 and continues through their February anniversaries of 1980, 1981, 1986, 1992, and 1993. Variety's review stated, "Through illnesses, career successes and setbacks, second marriages, second families, divorces and grandchildren, Doris and George meet each year to renew their affair, which itself seems forever changing and dynamic." As for the production Variety wrote, "a few wonderful comedic moments and some memorable one-liners, but this production is generally flat, overlong and never manages to soar as high as the original."
