= Marc Dumitru =

German actor and singer

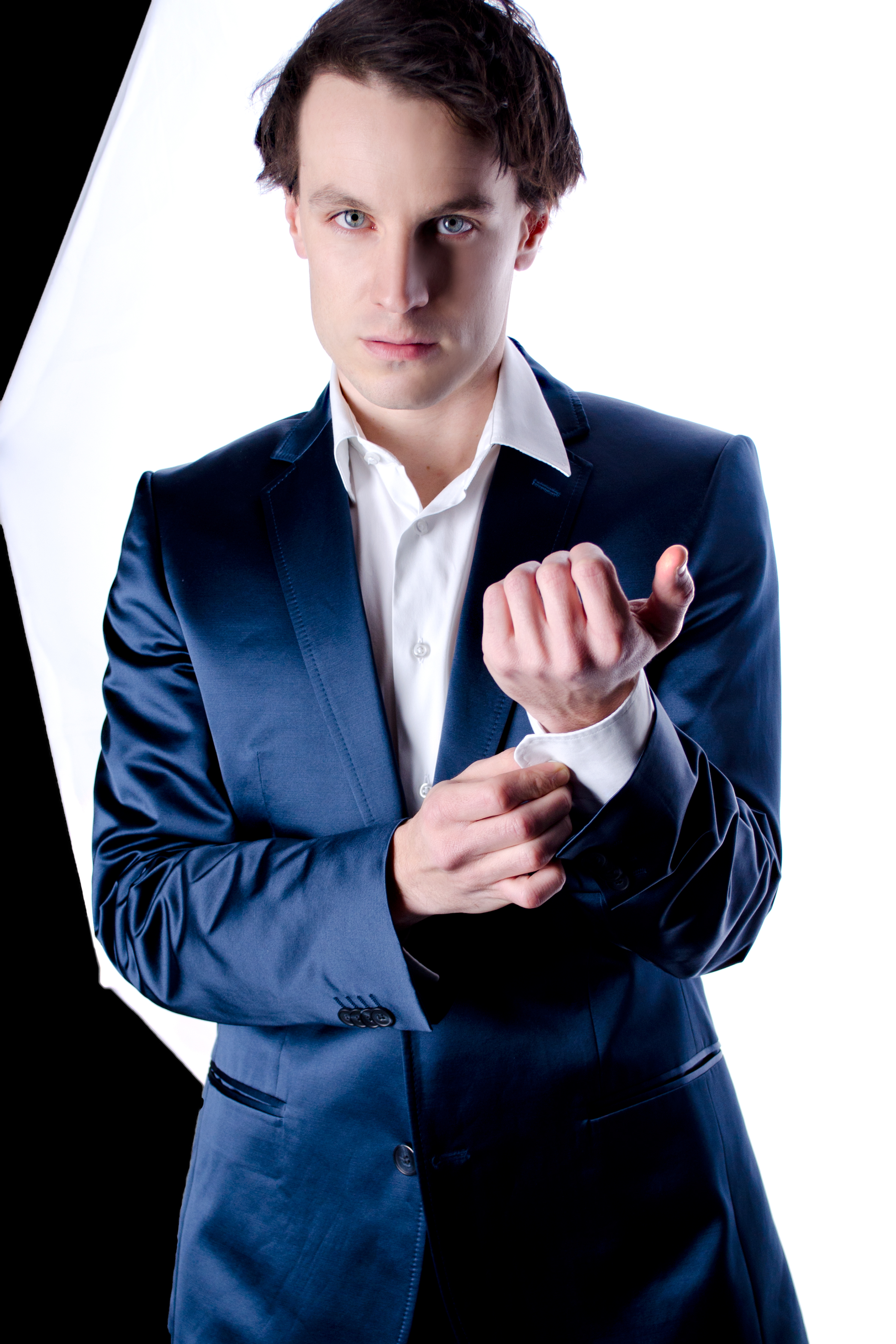
- Born: Marc Dumitru; 5 April 1986 (age 40); Überlingen, West Germany
- Occupation: Actor
- Years active: 2003–present

Marc Dumitru (born 5 April 1986) is a German actor and singer of Romanian descent. He is known for his role in the German TV-show Das Haus Anubis. He plays the role of Magnus von Hagen, who is the German version of Jeroen Cornelissen and Jerome Clarke. In July, 2015 Marc appeared in the commercial called "Travian Kingdoms". He has appeared on Let's Dance in Germany with Kristina Schmidt. He was in the Chris Brenner music video "On the Run". He was also live in RTL Nitro today in Die 24 Stunden vom Nürburgring - Das größte Autorennen der Welt (The Nürburgring 24 Hours - The biggest race of the world). In 2018, he married Kristina Schmidt. He plays Dr. Jan Kühnert in Nachtschwestern.

== Media ==
Year	Title	Role name			
2006	Lenßen & Partner - Mörderische Hochzeit	Feix Lessing			
2007	Australia	Supernumerary			
2007	Lenßen & Partner - Mord auf dem Pausenhof	Andy Klein			
2008	Gute Zeiten, schlechte Zeiten	Oliver May			
2009–2012	Das Haus Anubis (TV series)	Magnus von Hagen			
2012	Das Haus Anubis – Pfad der 7 Sünden (film)	Magnus von Hagen	2010	Das Haus Anubis – Pfad der 7 Sünden (film)	Magnus von Hagen
2019-2020	Nachtschwestern	Dr. Jan Kühnert			

== Discography ==
=== Album ===
Year	Title	GER	AUT	Infos
2010	Das Haus Anubis - Das Album zur Serie	67	20	as a member of Anubis-Cast
