= Das Haus Anubis =

- Genre: Soap; Mystery
- Opening theme: Das Haus Anubis (The House Anubis) by Kristina Schmidt (season 1); Suche mit uns (Search With Us) by Kristina Schmidt (season 2); Tausend Fragen (Thousand Questions) by Kristina Schmidt (season 3)
- Countries of origin: Germany; Belgium
- Original language: German
- No. of seasons: 3
- No. of episodes: 364

Production
- Running time: 12 minutes

Original release
- Network: Nickelodeon
- Release: 29 September 2009 – 4 May 2012

Related
- Hotel 13; Het Huis Anubis

Das Haus Anubis is a television program produced jointly by Belgian broadcaster Studio 100 and Nickelodeon Germany. The first remake of Het Huis Anubis aired in The Netherlands and Belgium. Another English remake called House of Anubis aired in 2011. With a seven-figure production budget, it is one of Nickelodeon's largest in-house productions, and the first German daily soap opera specifically aimed at older children. From 29 September 2009 to 4 May 2012, the show aired on both children's channel Nick (daily at 7:40pm, and repeated in the afternoon and at weekends), and season 1 on music channel VIVA. Das Haus Anubis is aimed at children twelve years old and above, and is the German remake of the successful Dutch television programme, Het Huis Anubis. This 2006–2009 series was one of the most successful children's series in the Benelux countries.

== Summary ==
The show focuses on eight young people living at a boarding school, Haus Anubis, of which Nina is the newest occupant. On the day of her arrival, the surly steward, Viktor, shows her her room. What she does not know is that her room previously belonged to Linn, the best friend of classmate Luzy; Linn has disappeared without a trace. Nina's first encounter with Luzy is not exactly cordial; Luzy, who is very concerned for Linn, would rather throw the frightened Nina straight out.

But this is not the only secret in the school. The walls of the house, in which the eight students live together, seem to hide another secret. A fellow student disappears, the caretaker seems on his guard and the teachers begin acting strangely when talking about the Haus Anubis. A little anxious, but driven by curiosity, the students set out to discover the secrets of their home.

== Differences with the original version ==
There were several changes made from the original Dutch version. The first major difference is the character’s names. Apart from Victor, everyone has another name, however their personalities and taste in clothes stay the same as in the Dutch version. Another thing to note is that the synopsis of season one was identical to the Dutch version.

== Actors ==
=== Main cast ===
German Name	German Actor	Episode	Year	Dutch counterpart	British counterpart
Nina Martens	Kristina Schmidt	1-364	2009–2012	Nienke Martens	Nina Martin/KT Rush
Luzy Rosaline Schoppa	Alicia Endemann	1-364	2009–2012	Patricia Soeters	Patricia Williamson
Daniel Gutenberg	Daniel Wilken	1-364	2009–2012	Fabian Ruitenburg	Fabian Rutter
Delia Seefeld	Franziska Alber	1-364	2009–2012	Amber Rosenberg	Amber Millington
Kaya Sahin	Karim Günes	1-364	2009–2012	Mick Zeelenberg	Mick Campbell
Felix Gaber	Florian Prokop	1-289-290	2009–2011	Appie Tayibi	Alfie Lewis
Felix Gaber	Mitja Lafere	290-364	2011–2012	Appie Tayibi	Alfie Lewis
Magnus von Hagen	Marc Dumitru	1-364	2009–2012	Jeroen Cornelissen	Jerome Clarke
Mara Minkmar	Féréba Koné	1-364	2009–2012	Mara Sabri/Noa van Rijn	Mara Jeffrey
Victor Emanuel Rodemer Junior	Kai Helm	1-364	2009–2012	Victor Emanuel Rodenmaar Junior	Victor Rodenmaar Jr.
Charlotte Bachmann	Alexa Benkert	125-364	2010–2012	New character. Based on Joyce van Bodegraven	-

=== Supporting characters ===
German Name	German Actor	Episode	Year	NL pararell	UK Parallel
Edith Martens	Gerda Böken	1-234	2009–2012	Irene Martens	Evelyn Meridian Martin
Hubert Altrichter	Ulrich Cyran	1-364	2009–2012	Ari van Swieten	Eric Sweet
Rosie Schäfer	Petra-Marie Cammin	1-364	2009–2012	Trudie Tayibi	Trudie Rehman
Doris Altrichter, b. Engel	Jana Hora	7-364	2009–2012	Elly van Engelen/Elly van Swieten	Daphne Andrews
Wolf Radus/Raven	Carlo Kitzlinger	143-234	2010–2011	Wolf Rensen/Raven van Prijze	Collector
Benny Schäfer	Martin Zürcher	158-182	2010–2011	Jimmy Tayibi	-
Max	Torben Bendig	136-234	2010-2011	Robbie	Eddie Miller (Main character in season 3)
Max	Janis Witting	239-364	2011-2012	Robbie	Eddie Miller (Main character in season 3)
Daphne	Silke Natho	193-234	2011	Vera de Kell	Vera Devenish
Victor Emanuel Rodemer Senior	Kai Helm	236-345	2011–2012	Victor Emanuel Rodenmaar Senior	Victor Emanuel Sr.
Herr Sahin	Numan Acar	42-45	2009	Meneer Zeelenberg	Rory Campbell
Mohammed "Mo"	Damion Osu	69-72	2010	Mo(Mohammed) Tayibi	Phillip Lewis
Nabila	Marielle Sirot	70-72	2010	Nabila Tayibi	Marsha Lewis
Linn Bredemeier	Katharina Fecher	59-62, 75	2009–2010	Joyce van Bodegraven	Joy Mercer
Rufus Malpied	Michael Witte (Germany)	17-38, 53-75	2009–2010	Rufus Malpied	Rufus Zeno (Dr. Renee Zeldman)
Dr. Zeno Trabas	Alexander von Janitzky	57-58, 99-129, 239-364	2009–2012	Dr. Zeno Terpstra	Rufus Zeno (Dr. Renee Zeldman)
Svetlana Goski	Unknown	93	2010	Swatlana Lamasadu	
Robbie	Tom Gramenz	55-58, 111-114	2009–2010	Robbie/Robert van Swieten	Robbie
Sarah Winnsbrügge-Westerling	Liane Düsterhöft	3-91, 104, 114, 238-364	2009–2012	Sarah Winsbrugge-Hennegouwen	Sarah Frobisher-Smythe
Steffie Lehmann	Yvonne Burbach	11-114	2009–2010	Esther Verlinden	Esther Robinson
Schulrätin	Claudia Jakobshagen	60-61, 114, 304-354	2009–2012	De Rectrix	-
Großprior/Linn's father	Unknown	105, 114, 115	2010	Meneer van Bodegraven	Frederick Mercer
Luka Petkovic	Sascha Kekez	4-140	2009–2010	Jason Winker	Jason Winkler

== Discography ==
=== Songs ===
Year	Name	GER	Album	Notes
2010	Suche mit uns (en. Search with us)	80 (1 week)	Das Haus Anubis - Das Album	Single by Kristina Schmidt as Nina

The television series The House Anubis - Nothing is as it seems is a joint production of the Belgian broadcaster Studio 100 and Nickelodeon, the 29th since the September 2009 with great success on the TV station Nickelodeon is sent. It is the German version of the Dutch-language television show Het Huis Anubis . This series 2007/2008 was one of the most successful children's series in the Benelux countries.

With a seven-figure production amount, the series is the largest in-house production of Nickelodeon Germany since its launch and the first daily soap opera or Daily soap, which is aimed specifically at children. The start of series production studio 100 book, audio drama, DVD and PC game, will follow with less success offer classic products. The age of the target group was in Belgium and the Netherlands, eight to 14 years. The series Anubis is released in Germany since 6 years.

== Additional Information ==
=== Production ===
The original Belgian series Het Huis Anubis has in their country of origin and in the Netherlands achieved their greatest successes. For example, the series has reached an average of 35% market share in the target group and also won international awards. The success of the series goes beyond the traditional merchandising area, so there's been a roller coaster for the 2008 series.

Even in Germany, holds licenses for merchandise were awarded. Online, there are the browser game "Pirates Victors" and the end of October 2009 brought the Jumbo Games GmbH, a board game out of the series. The TV series has numerous offshoots like the year 2008 caused twisted movie, with its 700,000 visitors representing one of the most successful films of the Netherlands as well as a theater show, with 170,000 visitors. But also a book series was published, has sold over 500,000 copies of.

Therefore, the television station decided to create a German version of the series. The series will not sync it, but with German actors in the original scenes filmed again. The sender would like the house as well as Anubis in the Benelux countries, an extensive and generate spin-off merchandising program. The German actors have any time for stage, film or other versions are available and easily usable also for his actions Merchandise. On the first broadcasting day saw 350,000 viewers (total market share of 1.5 percent) and 330 000 viewers (market share of 1.4 per cent). In the "key demographic" there were market share of 2.2 percent and 2.3 percent. Like the Belgian original version was inserted in the German version, by episode 61, a short winter break. During this interval, the previously aired episodes were repeated.

Following the success of the series in Germany, gave Nickelodeon announced the production of a second season. The filming started in May 2010. According Bravo.de have on 3 March 2011, the filming of a movie by Anubis started. In the Belgian version, there was the first feature film as a transition to the third season and was called Anubis en het Pad der 7 Zonden, which in Dutch means Anubis and the path of the 7 sins. Although a third season was Nickelodeon has not announced, the agency by Karim Günes let know that the series went into extra time on 14 March 2011. In addition, Franziska Alber confirmed in an interview that the shooting would go for its third season until January 2012. In addition, the preview of the season finale of Season 2, an excerpt from episode 235 (the first episode of season 3 shown), and then yet another trailer for the third Season; in it Delia and Victor are talking about the fact that Delia had been in Egypt.

=== Season 1, Part 1: The Secret Club of the Old Willow Tree ===
Eight teenagers are living in a boarding school called ‘the Anubis House’. Nina is the new resident of the Anubis House. On the day of her arrival, the grumpy custodian Victor shows her around the school. What she does not know is that her room formerly belonged to Linn, the best friend of her classmate Luzy. And Linn has disappeared without a trace. So, the first meeting with the others does not exactly go smoothly. Luzy, who is very worried about her best friend Linn, would much rather throw the timid Nina straight back out again. She believes Nina has something to do with Linn's disappearance. The teachers and Victor behave more strangely whenever Linn's disappearance is mentioned. But these are not the only secrets in the boarding school. The walls of the house where the eight students are all living seem to be guarding a mystery. While Nina is visiting her grandmother Edith in a nursing home, she finds, in the corridor, a painting of the Anubis House. An older lady suddenly speaks to her and tells her that a valuable treasure lies hidden within the Anubis House. Nina receives a medallion from the lady and finds a picture of a young girl inside it.
The other students decide that in order to become one of them, Nina will have to go up to the forbidden attic of the house as a test of courage. There, she finds a sliding wall, and behind it she discovers a painting of the girl from the medallion. Behind the painting is an old piece of paper with a riddle on it. Daniel, whom Nina is beginning to confide in, is able to decipher for her the hieroglyphs for ‘stairs’ and the number ‘three’. One night, Nina sneaks down the stairs into the hall and looks underneath the third step of the staircase. She discovers an envelope labelled ‘Sarah’ with a key, as well as a new riddle. In the new theatre and history teacher Mr Petkovic's history class, she learns from a slide show that the new hieroglyphs are in fact the symbols for ‘on/above’ and ‘house’ respectively. With the key, she goes to the old lady, who thinks that ‘there is no turning back now’. Daniel, whom Nina has brought along, observes the conversation, and afterwards Nina tells him what she knows. Together they sneak into the attic, because the new riddle is pointing to the attic. There they find, inside a locked chest, some very old rolls of recording tape, on which a girl named Sarah is speaking about the alleged accidental death of her parents, the Winnsbrügge-Westerlings - and she mentions a man whose description exactly fits that of Victor. She also mentions a large, black raven, just like Victor's raven, named Corvuz (from the Latin word for raven). Victor's voice is even heard on the tape. Furthermore, Sarah talks about her life in the Anubis House as well as a treasure that lies hidden there. The riddles which she gives out in the recordings should lead to it.
Luzy remains firmly convinced that Nina had something to do with Linn's disappearance and asks the teachers, who, however, do not want to know anything about Linn. Furthermore, Linn is missing from all the school photos. Victor also behaves strangely when it comes to Linn. Luzy overhears a conversation between her teacher Mrs Engel and the headmaster Mr Altrichter, whereby she learns that they know more about Linn's disappearance than they are admitting. Luzy wants to make contact with Linn and tries to do so by leading a spiritual séance. From then on, a mysterious man by the name of Rufus Malpied seems to be following her. He knows of Linn, he claims to want to find out what happened to Linn and he says that he is on Luzy's side. But when he tries to meet with Luzy again, he is beaten up by Victor, ends up in a care home and remembers nothing more. Yet Luzy has also contacted other people, such as Luka Petkovic. He believes Luzy and even finds evidence, but after a conversation with Mr Altrichter, who shows Petkovic the Secret Files of Anubis, he, too, thinks that Luzy just made up the story and that no Linn ever existed.
Victor, Mrs Engel and their leader Mr Altrichter (and also, later, Mr Petkovic) are members of the secret Brotherhood of Anubis. Obviously they are not keeping Linn hidden for no reason. Thus, in the first episode, Victor immediately tears up a sticker bearing the label ‘Linn’ as soon as he sees it, burns her stuffed bunnies and disposes of her bicycle. Mr Altrichter secretly empties her locker at school. Quite often, there are secretive telephone calls between Victor and Mr Altrichter.
Meanwhile, Nina, Delia and Daniel establish a secret group called ‘The Club of the Old Willow Tree’ and make it their job to find out what happened to the girl discussed on the tape recordings. They find out that Sarah's parents were famous Egyptologists and were the founders of the ‘Anubis’ boarding school. From a history book and a photo album belonging to the old lady, they find out that the old lady is in fact Sarah. In addition, they find Victor in a picture that was taken in 1933. Since then, Victor has not aged. Convinced that Victor is brewing an elixir of life in the basement, the three of them sneak into the basement and steal a small bottle. When Felix mistakenly drinks it, however, it turns out that what was in the bottle was merely cleaning fluid.
Luzy, who after the incident with Rufus tries unsuccessfully to get in touch with him, finds him again in a care home and shows him a photo of Linn, but after that, he suddenly disappears without a trace.
Later, the club is busy trying to solve the riddle from one of the wax-cylinder tape recordings. Separately, they search the basement and the attic for clues, but find none. The eight occupants of the house want to perform the story of Sarah in the annual musical, and for additional inspiration and research, they visit the Delmar Mining Museum of Dr Zeno Trabas. They ask him about Horus (in a secret museum department where there also happens to be a picture of the Winnsbrügge-Westerlings) - whereupon he shows them a picture of the Eye of Horus. It turns out that Zeno Trabas is the strange man who has visited Sarah in the nursing home. When he sees Nina's locket, he wants to examine it immediately because it is such a valuable piece from Ancient Egypt. He speaks of the curse of the pharaoh, just as Mr Petkovic did in a lesson. As the club members run away from Trabas, they can hear him yelling from behind them that the Winnsbrügge-Westerlings had desecrated the grave of the pharaoh and died of the curse. He shouts at them menacingly, saying that they should leave the matter alone.
The following night, Daniel solves the riddle. It is about the two dark cavities under the two spherical knobs of the staircase. Under one of them he finds the last wax cylinder. Suddenly, Victor rushes out of his office and confiscates the cylinder. He asks menacingly what drove Daniel to go to see Trabas at the museum. Daniel has to follow him into his office, where Victor hides the cylinder in his safe. Daniel notices a monitor through which the entire house is kept under surveillance. Luzy informs Nina and Delia that she heard how Daniel was caught by Victor and that Victor is now in the attic looking for a tape player. They fail to hide the unit, but Nina manages to disconnect the crank. Victor finds the unit and takes it with him. With Felix's help, the club succeeds in hijacking the cameras on a laptop and they then use the cameras to figure out the numeric combination to Victor's safe. They decide that during the performance of the musical, Nina will go to the boarding house and retrieve the wax cylinder, since Victor will be busy attending the musical.
The musical is about Sarah's story, and through it, Nina, Delia, Daniel and Luzy want to show Victor that they know part of his secret. During the intermission of the show, while Victor is still at the recital hall, Nina hurries back to the boarding house and searches Victor's safe, where the last tape recording is located. As she does, she is filmed by Victor's camera. Thanks to an anonymous letter containing a seat number, Luzy notices during the show that Linn is in the audience! Moreover, an apparently fully recovered Rufus Malpied is there as well! Victor leaves the musical at intermission and goes back into the Anubis House. In the meantime, the confused Luzy lets the name ‘Linn’ slip out, at which point Mr Altrichter turns around and spots Linn, then leaves the hall immediately. Meanwhile, Nina listens to the tape recording, and on it, Sarah tells her that Victor killed her parents.
Nina hides when she sees on the monitor that Victor is coming into the house. Suddenly, Mr Altrichter rings Victor's office. Victor, who has noticed that someone was in his office, gets Mr Altrichter's message that Linn is in the recital hall, and immediately heads back to the school to eliminate the problem. Victor enters the hall and is angered when it strikes him that the caretaker played by Daniel is based on him. Furthermore, he is startled when Daniel mentions his elixir of life. But when Victor discovers Linn and lunges at her, she warns Luzy with a loud scream. Linn rushes out of the hall and Victor follows her. She takes refuge in a classroom where she feels safe, but Mrs Engel suddenly appears behind her, and just then, Victor storms in as well. The Brotherhood has surrounded Linn.

=== Season 1, Part 2: The Secret of the Tomb ===
As the musical draws to a close, Luzy, under the watchful eye of Rufus Malpied, finds a message underneath Linn's seat, stating that Linn wants to meet with her. The ‘Brotherhood of Anubis’, consisting of Mr Altrichter, Mrs Engel, Victor and Mr Petkovic, is furious with Linn for resurfacing on the very day that Tom, Dick and Harry are wandering all over the school. She is not just putting herself at risk, declares Mr Altrichter, who has just arrived in the classroom. Victor and Mrs Engel then carefully escort Linn out of the school, so that she will not be seen by anyone and they will be safe again.
Rufus speaks to Luzy in the girls’ lavatory. He thinks that Victor wants him out of the way so that he won't be able to find Linn, but he does not want to give any details about his hospital stay. Rufus knows that Luzy has received a letter and he tells her that she can trust him. As a result, Luzy shows up with Rufus Malpied at the meeting place agreed upon with Linn. When Linn unexpectedly fails to show up, Rufus kidnaps Luzy. Rufus now attempts to exchange Luzy for Linn and makes contact with the ‘Brotherhood of Anubis’. But the brotherhood members (Mr Altrichter and Victor) refuse to go along with it. Rather, they tell the other students that Luzy has gone to visit her aunt and uncle in Spain.
Students Nina and Delia do not believe, however, that Luzy is staying abroad; rather, they suspect that Luzy is in trouble and they begin researching her whereabouts. Rufus finds out and moves with Luzy to another location, but not before luring Nina and Delia to an abandoned factory building and locking them in there. A little later, they are both freed by Daniel. He had noticed their disappearance and had also managed to eavesdrop on a conversation between Rufus and Victor.
Daniel, Nina and Delia now confront Victor and accuse him of doing nothing to free Luzy. But Victor still denies that any abduction took place and insists, on top of all that, that Luzy really is with her relatives in Spain. Victor wants the three students temporarily out of the way, so he punishes them with three days of ‘house arrest’.
The next day, the three students meet with Mrs Engel. They are able to convince her that the time has come to meet with Rufus. Rufus does agree to a meeting, but he demands, in exchange for Luzy's release, the folder containing Linn's personal data. Mrs Engel warns Linn before her meeting with Rufus. This gives her and her family time to hide from Rufus. It comes time for the meeting between Mrs Engel and Rufus. While Mrs Engel stalls Rufus, Daniel, Nina and Delia set the kidnapped Luzy free. To enable Luzy and Linn to speak to each other, Mrs Engel arranges a web chat. Linn takes the opportunity to inform the school that of course, she will never go back there again.
But the boarding school, there are other problems that have nothing to do with Luzys kidnapping. Felix keeps his friend then hid Mon. But through a misunderstanding Mon thinks that Mara would be the friend of Felix. But this is indeed along with Kaya. When he comes back from England now, hugs and kisses his girlfriend welcome. But Mo thinks that Mara would betray his friend Felix and he proposes Kaya KO . But the friendship between Felix and Magnus is put to a severe test, because both love Mara. But Delia has her heartache . She is still in love with Kaya and wants to win her back. It begins now, Mara make bad before it occurs and, as this does not help, at the election of the student speaker against this.
Even the "club of old pasture" is still very active. This will still find out, what message has left Sarah on the capstans. But Victor has since them on their heels. After their liberation Luzy suffers from nightmares and feels threatened by Rufus. Daniel now trying to get the envelope, which is hidden behind the painting. To make this possible, by all means directs Nina from Victor. But Felix finds out by accident that his friend has escaped from a marriage to Nabila Mon and has been hiding because of the boarding school.
Victor succeeds in Nina's doll with the Grammofonkurbel to bring in themselves. The friends are now considering how they can once again approach the doll. Rosie looks in the meantime a new hiding place for Mo, because Victor had almost caught them. When Victor gets a package by accident while the alarm is triggered, this leaves his office. The package contains an old organ and Victor takes a liking to this. Since Victor is now busy for a while with the organ, the "Sibunas" penetrate into his office and listen to the guard role.
Later, when Daniel tried to hide the envelope back behind the painting, he is being watched by Felix. This observation tells his Magnus. Delia goes to play a full role as student president-nominee, while Mara is considering withdrawing her candidacy. Mon hiding still in the kitchen preparing Rosie difficulties there.
The disappointed by Mo Nabila asks Felix meanwhile they get married. This marriage is to restore the family honor. But Felix has a better suggestion. He wants to make sure that Mo and Nabila can meet in the washroom. But there Nabila not recognize this. In the meantime, Daniel finds out that you pull the disc out of Victor's Clock must. Victor is now the hideout of Mo and Nabila found. Felix can still save the situation but barely. When Victor comes home, he noticed that his clock is broken. Felix received the order to investigate the Clock. Luzy is now trying to influence Felix then to blur any traces left on the clock. The "Club sibunA" finds out that the note is visible on the paper with heat. So they keep the sheet over a candle. Because they are disturbed by Felix. He's on the Clock fingerprints found and now threatens to tell Victor everything if it would not solve the club. It is said in the "Club sibunA" everything. Delia appears unimpressed, however, their biggest concern is winning the elections. The "Sibunas" are now considering to take Felix, Luzy but has concerns in this regard.
Delia Mara and get another job. But as Delia imagines the same country as Mara, now they must choose a new one.
After several unsuccessful attempts, the window to pull out of the Clock, Daniel can get hold of this with the help of Felix finally. He is now a new mystery. When Daniel wants back in the cellar, Felix gets now problems with Victor. The "Sibunas" Felix told the secret. That is why this gets emotional problems and can not sleep at night. He is given a sedative by Magnus. But because Felix now sleeps through his appointment with the "Sibunas" because he should be the next morning included officially in the club.
Luzy helps Mara at the oriental theme day. Meanwhile, Victor and Sarah meet. He asks her out on the treasure. Delia performs her speech to Mr. Petkovic one, but this convinced them. Nina receives a dream sudden visit from Sarah and she warns them not to trust anyone on the boarding school, because Magnus has learned that the house is a treasure, because Felix talks in his sleep about it. When Nina wakes up the next day, she is very worried about her dream.
The "Sibunas" talk with Delia. They accuse her lack of effort. Delia is insulted and leaves. Later they will be asked of Magnus. Nina gets a call from her grandmother, Sarah had died in the night. Since Nina is clear that it was probably Sarah's spirit, who had warned in a dream. Felix is in the basement and finds an empty document. Victor now has a suspicion and brings an additional lock to the cellar door.
Nina receives a visit from her grandmother. This brings with her photos of Sarah. Da Mara does not know how they make their flyer to make, she asks for help Magnus. A few days later succeeds Nina, sneaking unnoticed out of boarding school and go to Sarah's funeral. Still, it is seen by Trabas Zeno, who is now under pressure. Nina and Daniel agreed that she gets anxious from the cemetery.
Delia does not know how they will make their theme day. Since Daniel and Nina decide help her. But unlike Delia seems to run everything well at Marah. Rosie has it even a soothsayer organized. At the end wins but Delia just the first round of elections to the student speaker. Daniel gets his information while at the fortune tellers without suspecting that this is bribed by Magnus. Magnus finds out so that he could Zeno Trabas from Delmar Bergmann contact museum. Felix, meanwhile, has seen the corruption of the fortuneteller.
Daniel continues to work on solving the riddle and finds a new clue. Victor now receives a mysterious package delivered, which makes strange noises. Magnus calls for Trabas, because he has information about the treasure. He does not, however, to what a treasure it is, and agrees to any question of Trabas. Magnus demanded 10,000 euros for the information. Magnus, who has been a mystery for Felix gets the money from Zeno and now buys a new DVD player as well as many new clothes. Trabas but will have more information.
Felix shares the "Sibunas" with that he has noticed, like Magnus has bribed the soothsayer. Through its information from the soothsayers inspired, Daniel will now start its investigations. Above all, it interested him where Magnus has a lot of money. Meanwhile, the soothsayer with Mara and Kaya talking about their relationship.
After school also blackmailed the soothsayer Magnus. But this can save his money again just out of this. Victor now leaves the house to visit his dying aunt located. The "Sibunas" seize the opportunity and send Felix again in the basement. But they are observed by Magnus. While Felix looks for clues in the basement, Daniel tried to reach him by radio. But Felix has forgotten his radio in his room, and Magnus, who is staying in this moment there can overhear everything.
Felix is an important clue, but Victor shows up unexpectedly. When he comes into the basement, Felix has been hidden in a crate. Felix is there witness to a mysterious ritual . While the others sleep together with fatigue, Felix stayed in the basement forced into the crate. The next morning, Magnus Felix appears in the basement and noticed in the box. Magnus asked Felix what he had driven all night in the basement and he can talk his way out with a fabricated reason. Thus freed Felix Magnus. Felix is back at school by the "Sibunas" celebrated, because it has found a new track.
The school superintendent announced that the candidates are scheduled to open the school representative selection kiosk. Since Delia but forgets this task, she panics. But thanks to her father, she can win again. Mara has had enough of the election and wants to resign.
Delia in the night dreams of a passionate kiss with Mr. Petkovic. Nina however, dreams about Sarah, she warns. Felix is happy in the "club of old pasture" to be taken. But when he falls asleep, Magnus asks him out on the treasure. As Felix begins to act weird, Nina has doubts about his trustworthiness. Delia thinks, however, that is blaming her failure in choosing their appearance, and created with Luzy a new outfit.
But even as she copied the outfit from Mara Delia, she is not good, and is ridiculed. Kaya even laughs about it until later and tried to comfort her. Magnus, meanwhile, is blackmailed by Zeno, and Felix is thus under pressure to get new information about the treasure. Felix now has to decide what is more important to him: the club or his friend Magnus.
Daniel can now solve the puzzle with the disc. You should become familiar with the telescope, the constellation Orion view. Since they no longer trust Felix, locking it with a perverse mystery on the wrong path. Victor is still in search of the disk and comes in between them, as he leaves free mice in the house Anubis. In consultation with Mr. Altrichter the eight residents now have to move into the school.
Nina and Daniel decide to return to the house that night, Anubis, to the constellation to look. But the two are caught by Mr. Altrichter. Nina, Daniel, Delia and Mr. Altrichter Luzy lock in his office, so Nina and Daniel can go to the house of Anubis. There, they are almost discovered by Victor, who hurries to school to free Mr. Altrichter. When Nina gets the disc, it finds that Victor has made the whole room upside down, the disc could not find it. Nina and Daniel look at Orion and Daniel get to see a text with a string of numbers. That night Felix Magnus also sent into the house Anubis, to the wrong puzzle that Felix Magnus immediately told to solve. Felix is looking to the attic after a disappearing wall. But Felix is caught by Daniel and Nina, as they look at the constellation Orion. You know now certain that Felix on Magnus' side.
Felix, however, confesses to Nina and Daniel's plan for the Great, and what he has told him about the treasure. The five "Sibunas" develop a plan to bring to Magnus from the track. Magnus Felix will provide you with all puzzles and finds that they have found so far, starting with the label behind the painting from the attic.
The next day meet Magnus, who has the puzzle there, and Zeno. Zeno told him of a ring that has given him Sarah. On this ring is engraved with today's date. Felix, Magnus pursued, is hiding in a dumpster and overheard the two. Later he tells Nina, Daniel, Delia Luzy and what he has heard: Zeno says that the treasure would be in the Anubis and the time would just slow. Felix adds the numbers of the sequence of the constellation and is on today's date. Meanwhile, Daniel finds out about the Internet that you Corvuz exactly where a water snake - that is in the tower room - is, at eight clock must hang so that the Grail appears. They rush to the house of Anubis, while Victor studied at the school after Mr. Altrichter. Victor finds out that Daniel and Felix have recently found out and rush to Anubis.
There, Daniel invents a puzzle that leads to the basement to distract the house also appeared in Trabas and Magnus. After Corvuz was hung in the tower below the water line, and Victor come Altrichter. Delia, Daniel Luzy and obstruct their way, as suddenly explodes Corvuz when it is illuminated by eight clock by light. Nina then sees the ghost of Sarah and her parents for a short time. Luzy and Victor and Delia can Altrichter not stay longer. When Victor sees the remains of Corvuz, Nina takes the Grail and now appeared with Daniel and Delia escapes upwards. At the same time Felix Magnus and Zeno Trabas storming out of the cellar, which is now under water. Victor starts to Zeno. Daniel and Nina are hiding in the bathroom followed by Victor. Victor wants to break the door. Meanwhile, Luzy takes a vase and deceives Mr. Altrichter, who believes that the Grail has Luzy. As Luzy destroyed the vase intentionally wants to hurt Mr. Altrichter Luzy. But Felix and ridiculed Mr. Altrichter Luzy can save it. Meanwhile, Victor gets to the bathroom, but Nina has disappeared, to the surprise and Victor Daniels with the Grail. Daniel sneaks into the room to Delia and the four "Sibunas" can escape through the window at the school dance.
Daniel and the others are concerned about Nina. But suddenly, Nina is displayed on the school dance. She and Daniel are then explained by students spokeswoman Mara's prom queen and king ball. On the dance floor tells Nina Daniel, where she has hidden the Grail and Daniel kissing. Magnus is threatened in his room in the school of Zeno, as this recognizes that the Grail is gone. Victor gets a call from the Grand Prior. This freaks out when he hears that the Brotherhood of the Grail and has not demanded to be told who brought the Grail in his possession.

=== Season 2, Part 1: The mysterious curse ===
After the club in the old pasture has found the Grail, they have to hide it, because Victor and including even Dr. Zeno Trabas, Magnus is still under pressure, are also on the lookout for him. Magnus has therefore recurring nightmares of Trabas. In a manuscript of Winnsbrügge-Westerling, Daniel finds behind the plate in the tower room, the club experienced the Old Pasture, what they need the Holy Grail. According to the legend of Tutankhamun and his secret love, Amneris, Tutankhamun built out of love filled her in a secret location in Egypt with a love grave treasures. This secret place she could find only when they only push with the Grail at a certain time at a particular location. Time and place they could find out by it solved the riddle, which he had made for them. Shortly after accident Tutankhamun and his real wife, Ankhesenamun, avenged themselves of Amneris, whereupon she and her illegitimate daughter disappeared. According to legend, Amneris will be no peace until she is reunited with the love of Tutankhamun's grave. Daniel is using this manuscript the hieroglyphics on the Grail and deciphered it. In addition, the members of the Old Willow learn of a secret wall full of mystery, apparently - was hidden somewhere in the house of Anubis Winnsbrügge Westerling - along with the Grail. Daniel deciphered the hieroglyphics on the Grail, and concludes from them that something is hidden in the Grail: This is the gate to my heart. Open me and you'll find love. When they open the Grail at midnight, they put the manuscript mentioned in the curse of the pharaoh's free, which is to lie on the grave, and loving the Holy Grail. Also reveals a new roll of papyrus with hieroglyphics. Exactly at that time, Nina's grandmother Edith a seizure and is now in a coma . In addition, Nina's and Daniel's friendship is marred by the kiss at the ball.
Luzy learns of Rosie, who recently engaged with the supernatural, predicted that an incredible person will come into their lives. Luzy believes that this person is her great love. But it turns out that this person is a girl named Charlotte Bachmann. Luzy friends with her. When Victor is Charlotte a room in the attic, looks Luzy the spirit of Amneris in the mirror and insists that Charlotte with her and Mara in the room sleeping. Since this is not Victor, but allowed to Mara of victim and pulls up to the attic.
The five Sibunas decipher the characters on the papyrus-roll, which was hidden in the Grail. A new puzzle: You must within seven days of the four elements are and follow them to find the secret wall. There would be time and place at which the chosen one could find out where is the love grave. By Felix's Laser Technology Nina, Delia and Daniel know a secret message on the note. Standing on her: open your heart for me . Finally, the club missed the elements earth, fire and air. When they find the water element, this leads the club in the basement, where they discover a very wet spot behind Victor's cabinet. They set it aside and open the secret passage to the award. In the secret room, they find the secret behind a curtain wall on which the Grail is depicted. Daniel deciphered the hieroglyphics on her and found out that seven jobs are run in order to make the whereabouts of the grave find love. All they need during a full moon with three cups of water, a concoction made from six ingredients, the drink of the six beauties, assemble and paint it on the second compartment of the secret wall.
Magnus, meanwhile, is set to remain under pressure from Trabas observed precisely at the request of him, making Felix. His observations led him to make the assumption that the Grail was hidden in the bathroom. One night, he sneaks up with Felix's espionage tool by the laser in the hallway and enters the bathroom through an oversight on the Grail. He hands over to him and demands his reward Trabas. But after drinking a sip of wine has Trabas from the Grail, this breaks down. Magnus gets scared and runs away. For a long time in Trabas' Delma Mining Museum, all conduct between him and Magnus on camera from a black-clad man seen with a raven mask. The next day the newspapers say that you have Trabas' body was found motionless and he later disappeared without a trace. This example parallels to the disappearance, in which Lord Carnarvon visited the grave of Pharaoh Tutankhamun and then has fallen mysteriously into a coma after he was hit by the curse of the pharaoh.
Nina's Medallion of Eye of Horus, which she had been given by Sarah, is found by Victor. Victor as it drops during sleep, Magnus finds it lying on the floor in Victor's office. He took on him and is haunted by nightmares ever since by increasing Trabas. The new history teacher, Wolf Radu, who replaced Luka Petkovic, then prevent him giving a pyramid, the nightmares will.
Victor, meanwhile, has a meeting with the man who wears a raven mask over his head after this Victor has contacted over telephone. This is called Raven . Raven explains Victor Anubis lying about the house in secret rooms and secret on the wall and asks him to help him in finding it. It turns out that Raven brought the Grail in his possession. Victor thereupon ordered a floor plan of Anubis. Nina and Daniel can forge this plan, so that Victor is not looking for the secret room in the basement, but in the garden. Again and again, Raven and Victor will contact unexpected visit, to find out how much Victor is in finding the secret room. He put him under pressure when he threatens him, he would lose the house Anubis. In search of a gray hair involuntarily eavesdrop Nina and Delia a conversation between Raven and Victor in his office and find out that Victor is working together with someone.
Meanwhile, Luzy mentioned in a conversation with Charlotte the club. Experienced as the other Luzys betrayal, Luzy rises out of the club. When everything goes wrong Mara: Kaya has no time for them. When she asks Magnus if he helps her in designing her room, he says yes. The two develop feelings for each other and Mara do not know if she's still in love with Kaya. At the farewell party for Mr. Petkovic, Magnus kisses Mara. As Kaya learns about the kiss that is pissed at Magnus. In order to please Mara, Mara's sister Malika Luzy calls to persuade her to attend Mara. Mara is pleased with the visit from her sister. As Kaya separates from Mara, she announces that she with Malika in Switzerland goes. Charlotte, Luzy and Rosie can talk about a Halloween Victor's farewell party for Mara to make.
Magnus, who finds his nightmare is going on regularly in his locker and Anubis again innumerable threatening letters. Here, the author is unknown. Magnus is to have something that belongs to the author. He threatens to Magnus, who do not know what he should do so, to lose everything that is dear to him, including Mara. As the author makes contact with Magnus on a chat program, it turns out that he is looking for a role - and not, as assumed by Magnus, after the medallion.
The Club of Old Willow manages to concoct the trunk of the six beauties. At the Halloween party is Delia goes to the basement and the purple concoction smeared on the secret wall. On the surface, a faceless, dark-haired girl reveals in a white dress holding the Grail above their heads. Right next to the girls dive on new hieroglyphics, so that the entire wall with Nina photographed. Felix finds out that this is the second order. Three Egyptian Dominoes lead to the code, it says. The way of Amneris, the Egyptian game of dominoes from the year 1300 before Christ. Because they cost Stones 1000 € per piece, decisions of the club, they steal from the antique shop of Daniel's uncle Per. The club finds out that also a pyramid out of certain ingredients must be created which belong to the dominoes.
Meanwhile, Daniel comes out of the club because he wants to be close to Nina's not just her good friend. He will be replaced by Luzy. When Mr. Daniel and Nina Altrichter the chicken Ingrid entrusted to a Bioligieprojekt, the two are forced to work together. Nina is furious with Daniel, who has kissed at the Halloween Party Charlotte. The two decide to take turns to look after the chicken, but when it steal into the same night in which Felix Luzy and the dominoes begin, to crow, Victor rushes into Nina's room and takes the chicken. Nina asks Victor to call Mr. Altrichter, which confirms the biology project. It turns out that it is an Ingrid Hahn. The night of Nina and Daniel have to spend in the bathroom along with Ingrid. Only when Nina sees in the wall mirror the spirit of Amneris, to reconcile the two again.
Felix forgets his key ring in the antique shop, which is Daniel's uncle on the school of Mr. Altrichter attention. This reports the theft of Mr. Altrichter and calls to pull Felix accountable. Daniel has been notified to get, as the club has reached the rocks and take the blame upon himself to calm his uncle. Daniel tells him he was going to this one girl. Daniel's uncle, understands the situation and expected to return the stones when they are no longer needed. He learns that even Zeno Trabas has been asking about these stones. On the same day visited Raven Daniels uncle, who apparently already knows Raven, in his business. Raven then poisoned him with the poison in his blue ring, so that it falls into a coma.
Daniel uses the printed photos of the secret wall to decipher all the hieroglyphics. He finds out that the dominoes must be made on the basis of their numbers in a specific order on the pyramid, before you let them fall over. Thus, the three dominoes reveal that belong to the secret wall. He writes a love letter with Nina simple hieroglyphics and submit it along with the photos on her desk. Victor, who is working on behalf Ravens continue to search for the secret room is, this letter, opens it and puts it on.
Once the Club has mixed together the right ingredients for the pyramid, a sort of blue liquid, which is to sound. Set the dominoes in the correct order to the built, blue-tone pyramid and flip it around. Three light up the fallen stones. Back in the basement, they put the three stones in the appropriate compartments. At the same moment, the pyramid will disappear from the secret wall and a drawing is visible: The girl with no face is now on an increase in addition to black characters. In a book, Daniel finds out that they need to plant for the third order three lotus seeds in the soil of a deceased person.
Victor is Rosie's son Benny, a heartthrob, as gofer one. Except for all the girls at the home of Mara are very pleased with him. Benny throws especially since an eye on Nina and this is no longer aware of their feelings is, they eventually all hidden under her bed, stuffed animals, because Benny is sent to repair her window. Victor wants to control as Benny's work, he finds all the stuffed animals at Nina's bed and pulls out her. He finds the papyrus scroll and takes it out of the Grail itself. Since Victor investigated further and any stuffed animals sewn back together wrong, the club suspects that Victor is on his verses. When Victor Benny instructions for Waste Disposal brings Benny burns a pile of newspapers, among which is the role. The role of burns, but Raven takes it anyway.
Nina questioned by Benny's presence on their feelings about Daniel and faints, as Benny suddenly take a job with Mr. Altrichter in school. The latter asks Benny, to care for Nina and invites him as a thank you to the movies this one. As Daniel trusted her, he agrees. Return as Benny and Nina at midnight, watching Daniel as it comes almost to a kiss between the two. Furious, he goes back to his room and no longer notices that Nina prevents the kiss.
Luzy and Felix manages to steal the necessary ground in a cemetery, while Daniel, who now acts against Nina repellent, notes that the seeds have to buy the Egyptian lotus flower only in India. He contacted a dealer who sold him the seed.
Rosie finds a book by Victor left school and wants to organize a birthday party for him, while Charlotte, Luzy and Max are working on a school newspaper. They believe that Mr. and Mrs. Altrichter Angels have a relationship and they go unnoticed in Mr. Altrichter office in order to make the front-page photograph.
Victor's birthday to find the images of Mr. Radu's secret wall that Victor still has hidden in his office. Shortly after, Victor discovered his gifts at an invitation by Raven, at a meeting in the garden to bring these images. Raven now knows where to find the grave and love how much time is left. It lacks, however, still the chosen one. Nina's diary from Victor suspects that this is Nina. Daniel discovers that the seeds are no lotus seeds. Nina is from Delia, Charlotte and Luzy informed about Benny, who wanted to arrange a meeting with all three at the same time.
Magnus gets more and more threatening letters, and while distancing themselves from Mara, who is mentioned in them menacingly. She asked Mr. Radu to speak with him. He entrusts himself unceremoniously at his teacher. Magnus gets the tip to focus on one object, to make decisions and steals the requested copy of the papyrus scroll from Felix 'Save.
Mr. Radu sends a copy of the student newspaper to a friend, she with the second award - honors - a camping trip. All boarders must come. Raven calls on Victor ride, because he needs him there for the Gralsritual. Victor makes sure that Rosie and Benny ill and leaves on the ground, to cook with.
On the way to walk to the camping camp Nina is kidnapped. Raven, in the nearby castle Ravenstein passes again everything he needed for the ritual, states that the medallion of the Horus eye, which lacks the chosen one must wear. Magnus gets a text message with the invitation to go to the castle. There, he is visibly shocked at the medallion Raven. Magnus panics when he sees the blue ring on Ravens hand. It's the same ring, focusing on the Lord Radu. Magnus, flees as he understood that Mr. Radu's the man with the raven mask and is the author of threatening letters, but can not leave the castle. Felix, Daniel and Luzy decide to look for Nina and land itself also in the chateau. There is now Victor, who is instructed by Mr. Altrichter to look for Nina.
Raven and Victor pull the white-clad, shackled Nina the ceiling from the body and pull her mouth off the bandage, after which she begins to cry loudly. Raven succeeds, try to calm short, as he pointed to a day ago had become worse health status of their grandmother. He calls on them to raise their hands and hold up the grail, so that the Gralsritual can be completed.
Victor and Raven are now about to perform the ritual.

=== Season 2, Part 2: The Chosen One ===
Nina is stuck with Raven and Victor in the castle. The two orders of the Grail Nina bound to raise their hands. But when the time nothing happens, Raven dismayed. Nina then begins to scream loudly. Raven befielt Victor eliminate all traces, while Nina hides the Grail under her pillow. Victor tries to prevent Daniel, Felix and Luzy can penetrate to Nina. Raven poisoned Nina, who then falls into a coma, and disappears. Magnus, meanwhile, tried to liberate. As all doors are locked, he takes the fire extinguisher and breaks the window. As he climbs down the wall, he gets to like Mr. Radu, known as Raven, the coat and take off the mask decreases. Mr. Radu then it creates with Daniel, Luzy and Felix to go to Nina. Victor, meanwhile, has called the ambulance. This notes that Nina has a weak pulse and brings her to the hospital. Mara Magnus writes a message in which he reported that he has to go underground for a short time.
In the evening, Daniel will finally know how it goes and Nina decides to visit her in hospital with Delia. Nina will then be too short, but can not remember anything. Mr. Radu, who is also studied there, the medallion and the eye of Horus Grail. Daniel and Delia are then caught by Victor as they try to sneak back into the house Anubis.
In an interview with Kaya Benny learns that Victor's birthday is the last of the recalls Nina. He senses a chance to rest and Daniel Nina visited her in hospital. Since Benny has spent on Nina's friend, the nurse can no longer Nina Daniel, because he is not a relative. Daniel wants to prove that he is not Nina's friend and Benny. Kaya helps him find the letter that Nina has written for Daniel, where she apologized officially. Luzy watched Benny, as he hides the medallion and the letter in his safe. Daniel Kaya, and Charlotte Luzy hatch a plan to distract them long enough to Benny to bring Nina's stuff from Benny's safe. After Daniel has taken the letter and the locket by Nina in itself, Benny is furious. When Victor learns of a nurse that Benny has Nina's stuff, Benny Victor threatened to throw him out of the house, he should not immediately give him things Nina. Since it no longer has Benny and Victor scolds him, Benny has had enough. He packed his things and leaves the house Anubis. All but Rosie, are happy that Benny is gone. Daniel loses his visit to Nina and Nina's letter reads it. You may remember something. She disappears from the hospital and rushes to lock Ravenstein. There they sought the Grail, which she has hidden in the pillow and goes back inside Anubis.
The relationship between Mara and Magnus is also not so good: Magnus, who has since resurfaced, Mara just will not say why he has disappeared. Mara thinks that you are not familiar with Magnus and can rebuff him.
When Victor finds out that Nina is back in the house Anubis, he locked her in her room and Delia must spend the night in room of Luzy and Charlotte. Luzy Delia and Nina want to watch and try not to fall asleep, lest Victor Nina can eavesdrop. But when sleep Luzy and Delia and Charlotte disturbs the creak of the door, she makes them. Daniel sneaks while already on Nina's room. Rosie went back a few incantations and joined in the bathroom, whereupon Victor she was bathing, so Rosie comes back to mind. Fearing that Rosie might be ill, Mara Rosie lets her sleep in the room. But then Rosie will find another Amneris cries together and the whole house and makes the house ghost fixed. Nina's memories are not complete and Victor tries to spy on them, in which he asks for, inter alia, the Grail and the medallion.
Victor has to pursue at the cemetery on a date with Raven, the Felix and Delia behind a bush. Daniel is very worried and drives to the ropes, as Felix and Delia tell him about the event. Meanwhile, Luzy gets love letters and love poems. They hypothesized that Kaya wrote her letters and poems. Then Charlotte becomes jealous, because she is likeable Kaya. When Magnus not visited the classroom of Mr. Radu, Mara did not understand at all.
Mr. Radu's lead with Magnus a long talk in the school. About the family history of Mr. Radu Magnus is well informed. He offers his help when Magnus meets his return, which was not yet known. To learn more about the seeds of blue lotus flower, Daniel visited his uncle in the hospital and is confident that his uncle knows about it. When Charlotte finds out that Max is the admirer of Luzy, they will help both to happiness. Max and Charlotte tinkering therefore a plan to prove Luzy that Kaya is not right for them. When Luzy will agree with Kaya, but says this off.
During his visit to the hospital by his uncle, Daniel gets the key from the antiques store. Together with Delia and Felix find there the seeds of the lotus flower. Felix finally finds her in a casket in a bird cage. Then suddenly emerges as a Raven, Felix steals the seeds from the box and runs away unnoticed. Raven takes the box itself and vanishes as well. After Raven has found that the Sibunas have tricked him, contacted Mr. Radu's the health department, which will look in the past Anubis. Rosie, who is just carrying out another of her wraith is, by the Health Inspector as "crazy" means. He requested leave Rosie and Victor set a new housekeeper. Mr. Radu Daphne calls and asks them to apply for Victor.
When Daphne quickly applying for the post of housekeeper, Victor holds none of it first. But when he noticed that Daphne has a stuffed dog as a pet, it is striking that they have the same likes and he falls in love with her. All residents of Anubis will find the new housekeeper Daphne likeable. All except Delia. Delia says she just wants to Victor einschleimen. Meanwhile, the club of old pasture planted the seeds of the lotus flower, which is growing dangerously fast. At night, Amneris visited the plant and they can grow. On the morning scare Nina and Delia. The plant has spread over Delia's dressing table. As they report them and Felix Daniel, Daniel said that the plant is dangerous because it has already warned his uncle before.
Luzy has an idea how they can find out if Kaya has her admirers. They organized a kiss in the school competition and ensures that participates Kaya. Max will photograph all participants. Luzy as the competition for a moment alone is, Max uses the opportunity and kisses Luzy. Luzy thinks out that Kaya has kissed her. After the Kaya Mister Kiss has received Cup dreams at night of Luzy Luzy Max is confused. Why she dreams of Max?
Nina returns to school and take care of Mr. Radu's touching them. Suddenly Nina can remember something and gets a panic attack. She leaves applied to the teaching of history. Daniel follows her and tries to comfort her. When they come back from school, the plant is wilted and Nina picks the new seeds. This put them in the wall in the secret room. The Sibunas are however disturbed by Victor and Daphne, taste the Victors moonshine. Mr. Magnus Radus commissioned by Nina snooping around in the room and Delia. There Amneris makes visible and frightened Magnus enormous. Meanwhile, Daphne and hit Mr. Radu and discuss their approach.
Luzy Kaya and finally have a date. This runs but does not expect Luzys boring. The two have nothing to say. And questioned whether Luzy Kaya is her dream guy. Charlotte and Max learn from this date, and draw hope again that maybe Luzy still in love with Max. Charlotte also noticed that Luzy has recurring dreams of Max. She persuades Max, Luzy in a letter asking for a date. Luzy then arises as to date and there Kaya expected, Max suddenly appears before her. Luzy it verschlägt the language. She wants to know nothing more of Max, because he has lied to them for weeks. Luzy crying out in Charlotte. This tries to persuade her to give Max a chance. But Luzy wants, Max leaves the office. Max gets wind of it and wants to leave the school. Experiences as Luzy that she wants Max to stop at first, but then realizes that she has a little bit in love with him. She makes it just in time to stop Max and confesses her love to him.
Delia, according to Felix and the puzzles looking new musical twins. A stroll through the park, they hit them. Only by telling a lie they can to persuade the father of the twins to appear in Anubis. Nina and Daniel visit Uncle Daniel. His condition has not improved. The two then go to the store and search a book. Unfortunately they had anticipated, and Raven has torn the required pages from the book. Raven is under further pressure on the Victor. Victor is terrified that he will lose the house Anubis if he does not meet demands Ravens. Nina dreams of Amneris and the melody can complete the concert. Delia Felix and Mr. Eiffel visit to pick up the instruments. Delia has pity on the old man and invites him to the concert.
Mr. Altrichter wants that Daniel and Charlotte join the physics competition. Because of all learning hours at school, Daniel has to stay there longer. The Sibunas try to stop the twins and their father. Daniel is dressed up just in time back to boarding school and the concert can take place. Magnus is to listen for the Lord Radus Sibunas. He steals Delia's scarf and builds up a bug and it returns Delia. Mara watched the two and is jealous. Your nerves Magnus' behavior and she has tired of his excuses and white lies, and separates from him. However you want to know what he hides from her and follows Magnus.
Felix builds an antique camera to see the aura of people and the blood trace. He asks Luzy, Max if he could help. Luzy reacts funny. Even with a picnic, it behaves strangely. Daniel has a lot of fun with Charlotte at the physics experiments. He does not realize that Nina feels left alone. Luzy and Max have a date that is interrupted by Kaya. Max invents Luzy to love an excuse. Luzy ashamed no longer with Max and introduces him to the school. When they are in the office of Mr. Altrichter kiss, they are surprised by it.
Victor gets a lot of bills and he does not know how he will pay for all. He asks a bank employee, whether they can give him a loan. Since this financial situation is not possible in Victor, Victor reviled him as a cutthroat. The bank employee reported the then Mr. Radu. Victor has a new plan: he brews a truth serum. This was replaced by Daniel. After Victor Magnus caught in the cellar, he persuades him to drink a little serum. Magnus realizes that Victor is crap and serum qautscht with Victor until he falls asleep. It opens the secret wall and told Mr. Radu of his discovery.
Out of jealousy for Charlotte Nina sneaks into the physics competition and there is the theoretical part. As the practical part of her one mistake happened and scared, she accidentally loses her wig. Nina ashamed so much that she leaves the physics laboratory. Daniel follows her and apologizes, but he has not recently cared about them. Nina can no longer continue in the competition. Daniel and Charlotte to win the prize, and Mr. Altrichter is very proud.
Mara Amneris sees in the mirror in the bathroom and when she is still terrified of Felix, she faints. Magnus is Mara with Felix and does weird problems. Magnus then meet with Mr. Radu. Mara follows him but is distracted by Daphne. Luzy to win a game of chess against Max Max Therefore, you imagine his father. Luzy in for a surprise. You can not believe that Mr. Altrichter is the father of Max. Felix is the old-fashioned camera ready and shoot photos with other club members. Meanwhile, Mr. Radu and Daphne are planning a further blow to destroy Victor. Daphne distributed in Anubis aggressive wood worms. She is disturbed by Amneris, and follows her. In developing the photos and see the club members Amneris now know that Rosie was right. Sibunas hear the song from Maras rooms and visit them there. Daphne is locked in the closet of Amneris. Magnus sneaks into the secret room and there steals the Grail and the medallion.
After Victor Daphne freed from the closet, he gets a visit from the bailiffs. He takes refuge with a white lie. Mr. Radu discovers that Mara's tuition is paid by an Arab account. Daphne will overshadow Mara. You will witness how they will meet with the secretaries of her father and gets a lot of money. Magnus Mara offers to 100 000 € to get his father out of jail. Magnus can not accept this gesture. Nina visiting her grandmother in the hospital. The nurse tells her that she has to live only two or three weeks. Daphne cheer on Nina.
Victor Felix presented his ghost suckers. The demonstration is done with a little accident and Victor Felix forbids to use the vacuum cleaner. He also shows that Daniel and Delia. He travels from one curtain and smashed two chairs. Victor is furious and Daniel noticed the wood worms. Victor gets his insect spray and polluted the house of Anubis. As he searched the rooms of Magnus Felix and he is caught by Mara. Mara wants to see what Victor has sought and is caught by Magnus. Magnus thinks now that he spied Mara. Felix Mara consoles and offers itself as a ghost hunter. Luzy and Max and Charlotte want to Kaya's luck a helping hand. Luzy is reading Charlotte's diary that she can be with Kaya not together, because her father will not allow this relationship.
Magnus recognizes that not the Grail and the locket safely in his room and he decides to bring the two treasures in the secret room. There, caught him and the Holy Grail and Victor took on him the medallion. Nina, Delia and Daniel have the same dream of Amneris, where she shows up. When Magnus wants to apologize to Mara, where Felix does, he is furious and wants the two have nothing to do. Delia calls on Rosie to ask them for advice. Nina visits her grandmother and gets support from Daphne. Daphne has agreed to meet with Victor. This happens no more. For Mr. Radu has found that Mara is related to Amneris and therefore is the chosen one. Delia and Felix want to listen to Rosie's advice and get in touch with Amneris. Amneris makes the two realize that Mara is the chosen one. Daphne stunned Mara with a poison and carries her off with Mr. Radu. Delia and Felix find the bloodline in Mara's room. Magnus, who is currently in the secret room sees Mara on the wall.
Luzy and Max send Charlotte to an interview with Aylin. What Charlotte does not know, is the sister of Aylin Kaya. Aylin Charlotte is a ticket for her concert. Kaya is mad at Max, that the mystery of his sister he could not keep it to themselves. Charlotte and meet at the Kaya concert Aylin. After the representation, Kaya apologized to his sister Charlotte and both are on their way home. However, they are stopped by Luzy, Max, Mr. and Mrs. Altrichter angels that they invite to the Amusement Park. Max apologizes to Kaya.
Daphne and Mr. Radu Mara caught hold in the lock. Mara realizes that Daphne has played to all and that Mr. Radu's just what is dangerous. The Sibunas noted that the Grail and the locket are gone and guess the things with Victor. Nina wants to reclaim the property and is caught by Victor. You can take the stone medallion in the Grail is not. Rosie will also appear and still finds Victor's bills. The bailiffs can come and evacuate the house Anubis. The Sibunas can fulfill the final task. You have to heat the stone from the medallion so long until it is golden brown. Daniel Felix and dress up the table and pick out hardwood from the secret room in the basement. As Nina inhales the smoke from the gem, she faints. Magnus is put under pressure by Mr. Radu. After he brought him to the Grail and the locket, he will now also get the gem. While Nina is impotent and obsolete Delia assistance, exchanges Magnus from the stone, and hurries back to the castle. He visited Mara, who tells him that he should close by the wall Close your heart to me says. He overhears Daphne, as with Radus phone and tells him that it was naive to believe him Magnus.
The bailiff is appalled by the woodworm infestation and can block the Anubis. No one may enter it. Nina has now regained her memories and she knows where Mara is. The Sibunas decide to ask for help, and Mr. Radu's get him to the house of Anubis. There they meet Magnus. The five residents have no idea that Victor is watching them. Suddenly, Raven and the Sibunas learn that Mr. Radu's the man with the raven mask and that Magnus puts him under a blanket. Magnus and Raven go into the secret room. Raven puts the gem into the right field in the wall and the two learn that the time is at sunrise. Magnus comes to ponder and decide. He takes the Grail from Raven and the medallion and locks it using Mara's spell Close your heart to me in a secret room. In the hall he meets Nina, Daniel, Delia, and Felix, where he confesses everything to them, Nina returns the treasures and apologized to Felix. The five set off on the way to the castle, while Raven will be released by Victor. Raven tricks from Victor and locks him into the secret room.
Charlotte, Kaya, Luzy, Max, Mr. and Mrs. Altrichter angels have great fun in the amusement park. After a roller coaster ride that threatens to suffocate Mr. Altrichter hard candy. Kaya and Mrs. Engel to help him, whereupon Mrs. Hubert kissing angel and asking them later to a dance. Mr. Altrichter takes the opportunity and makes angels wife to marry him. Mrs. Engel is not ready to marry Mr. Altrichter and disappears. Mr. Altrichter is in mourning. Max now writes with his wife Angel and tries to persuade her to marry Hubert yet. Max's plan works and Ms. Engel is in a wedding dress in the theme park.
On the way to the castle to meet Nina, Daniel, Felix and Delia at Daphne, who is facing the Sibunas in the way and attacking them with a stick. Delia distracts Daphne, while Nina, Daniel Felix and sneak into the castle. Magnus looks like Raven Mara holds in its talons and wants to help her. On top of the tower then meet all the Raven has tied up Mara and Magnus tries to liberate. Nina, Delia, Daniel and Felix are threatened by Daphne with a spear. Raven attacks as Magnus, Mara did not want that something happens and Magnus holds up the Grail. Amneris and Tutankhamun appear. Raven Amneris is the Grail. Raven suddenly burns and dies. His remains will disappear. Daphne is furious and pulls away from. Amneris Tutankhamun and disappear, leaving a papyrus scroll with the coordinates of the grave love. Everything has changed for the better: Mr. and Mrs. Engel Altrichter have married Nina's grandma is again awakened from the coma, the relationship between Mara and Magnus runs well again, Charlotte and Kaya are now together and Magnus' father was released.

=== Broadcasting in other countries ===
==== Sweden / Denmark ====
In Sweden and Denmark for some time under the name of Anubis Huset / Huset Anubis aired the original series.

==== Mexico ====
Even in Mexico since the original longer series from Belgium is on the transmitter Once TV shows. The Mexican title is La Casa de Anubis .

==== USA, Great Britain ====
In the United States and Great Britain since the first January 2011 English remake called House of Anubis broadcast.

=== Albums ===
Year	Name	GER	AUT	Notes
2010	Das Haus Anubis - Das Album (en. The house of Anubis - The album)	67 (2 weeks)	20 (2 weeks)	Singers: Marc Dumitru, Féréba Koné, Nina Schmidt, Alicia Endemann

== Books ==
Released date	Title	Translation	Pages
4 December 2009	Der geheime Club der alten Weide	The secret club of old pasture	336
20 April 2010	Das Geheimnis des Grabmals	The secret of the tomb	336
6 October 2010	Das große Fanbuch	The big fan book	48
18 November 2010	Der geheimnisvolle Fluch	The mysterious curse	336
29 April 2011	Die Auserwählte	The chosen one	336

== Awards ==
Year	Award	Result
Kid's Choice Award 2010 Germany
2010	Favorite TV series	Won
2010	Favorite actor for Florian Prokop	Won
7. Fernsehpreis
2010	Best series for children	Won
CMA Wild and Young Awards 2010
2010	Best newcomer national for Daniel Wilken	Lost
Bravo Otto-Wahl 2010
2010	Favorite actress for Kristina Schmidt	Lost
Kid's Choice Awards 2011 Germany
2011	Favorite actress for Kristina Schmidt	Won

- The names of the categories are translated into English
