= Lenßen & Partner =

German television show

- Genre: Scripted reality
- Country of origin: Germany
- Original language: German
- No. of seasons: 8 as Lenßen & Partner; 1 as Lenßen
- No. of episodes: 1303 as Lenßen & Partner; 57 as Lenßen

Production
- Running time: 21 minutes

Original release
- Release: 10 March 2003 – 25 May 2012

Lenßen & Partner was a German scripted reality crime procedural and legal drama that was produced by Constantin Entertainment GmbH and aired on Sat. 1. It ran from 2003 to 2009 in the station's early evening program. The series was filmed in and around Munich.

From 5 March 2012, the series ran as Lenßen and was completely recast except for the titular character Ingo Lenßen and was filmed in Essen. The first episode was a crossover with Richter Alexander Hold, a German courtroom show. The series was – based on bad ratings – cancelled on 27 April 2012 and the last episode aired on 25 May 2012.

== Plot and concept ==
The series centers around lawyer Ingo Lenßen and his team of private investigators who work on behalf of Lenßen's clients. They mostly investigate crimes like extortion, kidnapping or fraud. Despite the show repeatedly noting that they present the work of private investigators, the characters often execute police duties such as crime scene investigation and arresting perpetrators. Characters – including the investigators themselves – often get captured and held hostage by the criminals they are investigating.

At the end of every episode the case is solved and the criminals face justice. Most episodes have self-contained plot lines and do not carry over to the next episodes.

All cases portrayed on the show are fictional, however the show tries to convince viewers that they are real, re-enacted criminal cases.

Some indications of this are the following:

- The coverage of the cases is reminiscent of shows such as America's Most Wanted, Crimewatch or their German inspiration Aktenzeichen XY… ungelöst:
  - an off-camera announcer who gives the viewers facts and background information concerning the portrayed situation
  - overlays with time and place after a scene change
  - the addition of video feeds from security or hand-held cameras
  - shaky cam footage to accentuate spontaneous and authentic production
  - license plates and faces of passers-by are made unrecognizable
- The end of an episode always features the verdict of the court case.
- Most starring and recurring actors – including titular character Ingo Lenßen – are credited with their own names.

== Cast ==
Year	Lawyer	Investigative team 1		Investigative team 2		Secretary
2003	Ingo Lenßen	Christian Storm	Sandra Nitka (Sandra Zirngibl- Kowalski)	Katja Hansen (Sandra Corzilius)	Tekin Kurtuluş	Gabi von Polsdorf (Gabriela von Polsdorf)
2003–2004	Ingo Lenßen	Christian Storm	Sandra Nitka (Sandra Zirngibl- Kowalski)	Katja Hansen (Sandra Corzilius)	Tekin Kurtuluş	Gabi von Polsdorf (Gabriela von Polsdorf)
2004–2005	Ingo Lenßen	Christian Storm	Sandra Nitka (Sandra Zirngibl- Kowalski)	Katja Hansen (Sandra Corzilius)	Tekin Kurtuluş	Gabi von Polsdorf (Gabriela von Polsdorf)
2005–2006	Ingo Lenßen	Christian Storm	Sandra Nitka (Sandra Zirngibl- Kowalski)	Katja Hansen (Sandra Corzilius)	Mark Blomberg (Tim Riedel)	Gabi von Polsdorf (Gabriela von Polsdorf)
2006–2007	Ingo Lenßen	Christian Storm	Sandra Nitka (Sandra Zirngibl- Kowalski)	Katja Hansen (Sandra Corzilius)	Sebastian Thiele (Sebastian Jäger)	Julia Brahms (Friederike Lohrer)
2007–2008	Ingo Lenßen	Christian Storm	Sandra Nitka (Sandra Zirngibl- Kowalski)	Katja Hansen (Sandra Corzilius)	Sebastian Thiele (Sebastian Jäger)	Julia Brahms (Friederike Lohrer)
2008–2009	Ingo Lenßen	Christian Storm	Julia Brahms (Friederike Lohrer)	Katja Hansen (Sandra Corzilius)	Sebastian Thiele (Sebastian Jäger)	Sandra Nitka (Sandra Zirngibl- Kowalski)
2009	Ingo Lenßen	Christian Storm	Katja Hansen (Sandra Corzilius)	Sandra Nitka (Sandra Zirngibl- Kowalski)	Sebastian Thiele (Sebastian Jäger)	Nina Marx
2012	Ingo Lenßen	Karsten Grabowski (Alexander Höll)	Stefanie Scholz (Alex Jäger)	Jan Fischer	Lara Kampmann (Inga Kristina Oepke)	none

However, there have also been differing constellations of investigators.

In the episode airing on 26 May 2008, Sandra Nitka goes on maternity leave and returns on 1 September 2008.

When the show came back on air in 2012, two completely new teams were introduced who usually had alternating appearances in the episodes. However, they would occasionally appear together in an episode.

Notable guest actors include:

- Münchener Freiheit, band
- Holger Fach, football player and coach
- Axel Schulz, boxer
- Alexandra Rietz, Michael Naseband und Gerrit Grass, detectives from K11 – Kommissare im Einsatz.
- Palina Rojinski
- Alexander Hold

== Crossovers ==
Lenßen & Partner can be considered a spin-off off the courtroom show Richter Alexander Hold, where Ingo Lenßen occasionally appeared as a defense attorney from 2001 to 2012.

There have been several crossover episodes with K11 – Kommissare im Einsatz, which aired directly after Lenßen & Partner:

- Lenßen & Partner season 4 episode 122: "Lenßen unter Mordverdacht" ("Lenßen suspected of murder")
- Lenßen & Partner season 6 episode 28: "Kommissar Naseband in Not" ("Detective Naseband in trouble")
- Lenßen & Partner season 7 episode 41: "Intrige gegen das Ermittlerteam" ("Intrigue against the investigative team")
- K11 – Kommissare im Einsatz season 6 episode 43: "Christian Storm unter Verdacht" ("Christian Storm under suspicion")

== Reception ==
=== Correspondence to reality ===
Besides the series' unrealistic portrayal of the work routine of private investigators, the show has also been criticized for portraying private investigators as having similar power and authority as police officers (e.g. breaking and entering, placing bugs and cameras). The investigators also regularly use guns and physical force to stop and interrogate criminals.

The Bundesverband Deutscher Detektive e. V. (Federal Association of German Detectives) has made an official statement concerning the behavior of the investigators on the show:

"If the television detectives had to justify their behavior in a courtroom, they would certainly receive a prison sentence of many years. Detectives in Germany do not have any more rights than any average citizen. [...] The portrayals in Lenßen & Partner have absolutely nothing to do with our actual detective work."

=== Ratings ===
The first episode of the revived series in 2012 had 1,94 million total viewers and the second episode – which aired directly after the first – reached a total of 2,54 million viewers.

=== Awards ===
Deutscher Fernsehpreis

"Beste tägliche Sendung" (Best daily series) – nominated (2003)

== Movie ==
There has also been a television movie titled Lenßen – Der Film which aired on Sat. 1 on 8 January 2011. The movie features the cast of Lenßen & Partner investigating organ traders.

The movie had 2,8 million total viewers and received mostly bad reviews.
