= Trittame xerophila =

Scientific classification
- Kingdom: Animalia
- Phylum: Arthropoda
- Subphylum: Chelicerata
- Class: Arachnida
- Order: Araneae
- Infraorder: Mygalomorphae
- Family: Barychelidae
- Genus: Trittame
- Species: T. xerophila

Binomial name
- Trittame xerophila Raven, 1990

Species of spider

Trittame xerophila is a species of mygalomorph spider in the Barychelidae family. It is endemic to Australia. It was described in 1990 by Australian arachnologist Robert Raven.

== Distribution and habitat ==
The species occurs in southern and central Queensland in semi-evergreen vine thicket habitats, including the Rundle Range (the type locality) and the Blackdown Tableland, as well as in the vicinities of Roma and Sapphire Central.
