= Ozicrypta lawlessi =

Scientific classification
- Kingdom: Animalia
- Phylum: Arthropoda
- Subphylum: Chelicerata
- Class: Arachnida
- Order: Araneae
- Infraorder: Mygalomorphae
- Family: Barychelidae
- Genus: Ozicrypta
- Species: O. lawlessi

Binomial name
- Ozicrypta lawlessi Raven & Churchill, 1994

Species of spider

Ozicrypta lawlessi is a species of mygalomorph spider in the Barychelidae family. It is endemic to Australia. It was described in 1994 by Australian arachnologists Robert Raven and Tracey Churchill. The specific epithet lawlessi honours Philip Lawless.

== Distribution and habitat ==
The species occurs in coastal North Queensland in vine thicket habitats. The type locality is Rose Bay, Bowen.
