= Ozicrypta combeni =

Scientific classification
- Kingdom: Animalia
- Phylum: Arthropoda
- Subphylum: Chelicerata
- Class: Arachnida
- Order: Araneae
- Infraorder: Mygalomorphae
- Family: Barychelidae
- Genus: Ozicrypta
- Species: O. combeni

Binomial name
- Ozicrypta combeni Raven & Churchill, 1994

Species of spider

Ozicrypta combeni is a species of mygalomorph spider in the Barychelidae family. It is endemic to Australia. It was described in 1994 by Australian arachnologists Robert Raven and Tracey Churchill. The specific epithet combeni honours Pat Comben, Minister for the Environment 1989–1992, for contributions to national park establishment in Queensland.

== Distribution and habitat ==
The species occurs in Far North Queensland in semi-evergreen vine thicket habitats. The type locality is Forty Mile Scrub.
