= Trittame augusteyni =

Scientific classification
- Kingdom: Animalia
- Phylum: Arthropoda
- Subphylum: Chelicerata
- Class: Arachnida
- Order: Araneae
- Infraorder: Mygalomorphae
- Family: Barychelidae
- Genus: Trittame
- Species: T. augusteyni

Binomial name
- Trittame augusteyni Raven, 1994

Species of spider

Trittame augusteyni is a species of mygalomorph spider in the Barychelidae family. It is endemic to Australia. It was described in 1994 by Australian arachnologist Robert Raven. The specific epithet augusteyni honours John Augusteyn of Olsen's Caverns, the type locality.

== Distribution and habitat ==
The species occurs in central Queensland in semi-evergreen vine thicket habitats. The type locality is Olsen's Caverns, 23 km north of Rockhampton.
