= Ozicrypta etna =

Scientific classification
- Kingdom: Animalia
- Phylum: Arthropoda
- Subphylum: Chelicerata
- Class: Arachnida
- Order: Araneae
- Infraorder: Mygalomorphae
- Family: Barychelidae
- Genus: Ozicrypta
- Species: O. etna

Binomial name
- Ozicrypta etna Raven & Churchill, 1994

Species of spider

Ozicrypta etna is a species of mygalomorph spider in the Barychelidae family. It is endemic to Australia. It was described in 1994 by Australian arachnologists Robert Raven and Tracey Churchill. The specific epithet etna refers to the Mount Etna limestone caves complex, of which the type locality forms part.

== Distribution and habitat ==
The species occurs in coastal Central Queensland in the vine thicket fringes of limestone caves in the Mount Etna region, as well as on sandy soils near Yeppoon. The type locality is Olsen's Caverns, 23 km north of Rockhampton.
