= Ozicrypta microcauda =

Scientific classification
- Kingdom: Animalia
- Phylum: Arthropoda
- Subphylum: Chelicerata
- Class: Arachnida
- Order: Araneae
- Infraorder: Mygalomorphae
- Family: Barychelidae
- Genus: Ozicrypta
- Species: O. microcauda

Binomial name
- Ozicrypta microcauda Raven & Churchill, 1994

Species of spider

Ozicrypta microcauda is a species of mygalomorph spider in the Barychelidae family. It is endemic to Australia. It was described in 1994 by Australian arachnologists Robert Raven and Tracey Churchill. The specific epithet microcauda is Latin for ‘small tail’, alluding to the relative size of the spider's posterior median spinnerets.

== Distribution and habitat ==
The species occurs in Central Queensland in open forest and semi-evergreen vine thicket habitats. Its known range includes Kroombit Tops, Mount Archer and Homevale. The type locality is Kroombit Tops, south-west of Rockhampton.
