= Trittame mccolli =

Scientific classification
- Kingdom: Animalia
- Phylum: Arthropoda
- Subphylum: Chelicerata
- Class: Arachnida
- Order: Araneae
- Infraorder: Mygalomorphae
- Family: Barychelidae
- Genus: Trittame
- Species: T. mccolli

Binomial name
- Trittame mccolli Raven, 1994

Species of spider

Trittame mccolli is a species of mygalomorph spider in the Barychelidae family. It is endemic to Australia. It was described in 1994 by Australian arachnologist Robert Raven. The specific epithet mccolli honours Angus McColl, of the Queensland Department of Primary Industries, for contributions of spiders to the Queensland Museum.

== Distribution and habitat ==
The species occurs in Central Queensland in bottle-tree vine thicket habitats. The type locality is Biloela, 120 km inland from Gladstone.
