= Trittame ingrami =

Scientific classification
- Kingdom: Animalia
- Phylum: Arthropoda
- Subphylum: Chelicerata
- Class: Arachnida
- Order: Araneae
- Infraorder: Mygalomorphae
- Family: Barychelidae
- Genus: Trittame
- Species: T. ingrami

Binomial name
- Trittame ingrami Raven, 1990

Species of spider

Trittame ingrami is a species of mygalomorph spider in the Barychelidae family. It is endemic to Australia. It was described in 1990 by Australian arachnologist Robert Raven.

== Distribution and habitat ==
The species occurs in the Bunya Mountains of south-eastern Queensland. It is known only from the type locality, Marlaybrook Station, near the Bunya Mountains National Park, beneath logs and stones in a semi-evergreen vine thicket with bottle-trees.
