= Ozicrypta wallacei =

Scientific classification
- Kingdom: Animalia
- Phylum: Arthropoda
- Subphylum: Chelicerata
- Class: Arachnida
- Order: Araneae
- Infraorder: Mygalomorphae
- Family: Barychelidae
- Genus: Ozicrypta
- Species: O. wallacei

Binomial name
- Ozicrypta wallacei Raven & Churchill, 1994

Species of spider

Ozicrypta wallacei is a species of mygalomorph spider in the Barychelidae family. It is endemic to Australia. It was described in 1994 by Australian arachnologists Robert Raven and Tracey Churchill. The specific epithet wallacei honours Doug William Wallace, an expert on the spiders of the Rockhampton area and contributor to the collections of the Queensland Museum.

== Distribution and habitat ==
The species occurs in coastal Central Queensland in rainforest and vine thicket habitats. The type locality is Farnborough, near Yeppoon, on the Capricorn Coast.
