= Trittame forsteri =

Scientific classification
- Kingdom: Animalia
- Phylum: Arthropoda
- Subphylum: Chelicerata
- Class: Arachnida
- Order: Araneae
- Infraorder: Mygalomorphae
- Family: Barychelidae
- Genus: Trittame
- Species: T. forsteri

Binomial name
- Trittame forsteri Raven, 1990

Species of spider

Trittame forsteri is a species of mygalomorph spider in the Barychelidae family. It is endemic to Australia. It was described in 1990 by Australian arachnologist Robert Raven.

== Distribution and habitat ==
The species has been recorded in eastern Queensland from Dalrymple Heights, near Eungella in the Mackay Region; Round Hill Head near Seventeen Seventy in the Gladstone Region; to the western slopes of the Great Dividing Range in the Bunya Mountains. Habitats include rainforests and vine thickets.
