= Ozicrypta digglesi =

Scientific classification
- Kingdom: Animalia
- Phylum: Arthropoda
- Subphylum: Chelicerata
- Class: Arachnida
- Order: Araneae
- Infraorder: Mygalomorphae
- Family: Barychelidae
- Genus: Ozicrypta
- Species: O. digglesi

Binomial name
- Ozicrypta digglesi Raven & Churchill, 1994

Species of spider

Ozicrypta digglesi is a species of mygalomorph spider in the Barychelidae family. It is endemic to Australia. It was described in 1994 by Australian arachnologists Robert Raven and Tracey Churchill. The specific epithet digglesi honours Silvester Diggles (1817–1880), Curator of the Queensland Philosophical Society's museum, which later became the basis of the Queensland Museum.

== Distribution and habitat ==
The species occurs in the Charters Towers Region of North Queensland in open grassland and eucalypt forest habitats, as well as in the vicinity of Emerald in the Central Highlands Region. The type locality is Wando Vale Station, 220 km north-west of Charters Towers.
