= Ozicrypta littleorum =

Scientific classification
- Kingdom: Animalia
- Phylum: Arthropoda
- Subphylum: Chelicerata
- Class: Arachnida
- Order: Araneae
- Infraorder: Mygalomorphae
- Family: Barychelidae
- Genus: Ozicrypta
- Species: O. littleorum

Binomial name
- Ozicrypta littleorum Raven & Churchill, 1994

Species of spider

Ozicrypta littleorum is a species of mygalomorph spider in the Barychelidae family. It is endemic to Australia. It was described in 1994 by Australian arachnologists Robert Raven and Tracey Churchill. The specific epithet littleorum honours Frank Little and family of Mount Molloy for their hospitality and knowledge of the flora and fauna of the type locality.

== Distribution and habitat ==
The species occurs in Far North Queensland. The known distribution extends from Isabella Falls, west of Cooktown, to Davies Creek National Park on the Atherton Tableland, and southwards to Townsville and Mount Elliot National Park. Habitat includes open forest with cycads and grasstrees. The type locality is Mount Molloy.
