= Ozicrypta palmarum =

Scientific classification
- Kingdom: Animalia
- Phylum: Arthropoda
- Subphylum: Chelicerata
- Class: Arachnida
- Order: Araneae
- Infraorder: Mygalomorphae
- Family: Barychelidae
- Genus: Ozicrypta
- Species: O. palmarum

Binomial name
- Ozicrypta palmarum (Hogg, 1901)

Synonyms
- Idioctis palmarum Hogg, 1901; Idiommata palmarum Raven, 1985

Species of spider

Ozicrypta palmarum is a species of mygalomorph spider in the Barychelidae family. It is endemic to Australia. It was described in 1901 by British arachnologist Henry Roughton Hogg.

== Distribution and habitat ==
The species occurs in arid Central Australia in riverine gallery forest. The type locality is Palm Creek, in the Finke Gorge National Park south-west of Alice Springs. The lectotype female was obtained during the course of the 1894 Horn Expedition.
