= Ozicrypta australoborealis =

Scientific classification
- Kingdom: Animalia
- Phylum: Arthropoda
- Subphylum: Chelicerata
- Class: Arachnida
- Order: Araneae
- Infraorder: Mygalomorphae
- Family: Barychelidae
- Genus: Ozicrypta
- Species: O. australoborealis

Binomial name
- Ozicrypta australoborealis Raven & Churchill, 1994

Species of spider

Ozicrypta australoborealis is a species of mygalomorph spider in the Barychelidae family. It is endemic to Australia. It was described in 1994 by Australian arachnologists Robert Raven and Tracey Churchill. The specific epithet australoborealis refers to the northerly type locality.

== Distribution and habitat ==
The species occurs in the Top End of the Northern Territory. The type locality is the King River.
