= Ozicrypta walkeri =

Scientific classification
- Kingdom: Animalia
- Phylum: Arthropoda
- Subphylum: Chelicerata
- Class: Arachnida
- Order: Araneae
- Infraorder: Mygalomorphae
- Family: Barychelidae
- Genus: Ozicrypta
- Species: O. walkeri

Binomial name
- Ozicrypta walkeri Raven & Churchill, 1994

Species of spider

Ozicrypta walkeri is a species of mygalomorph spider in the Barychelidae family. It is endemic to Australia. It was described in 1994 by Australian arachnologists Robert Raven and Tracey Churchill. The specific epithet walkeri honours Pat Walker, an expert on the spiders of Millmerran and the Toowoomba Region.

== Distribution and habitat ==
The species occurs in the Darling Downs of south-east Queensland. The type locality is Millmerran, about 210 km west of Brisbane and 80 km south-west of Toowoomba.
