= Ozicrypta pearni =

Scientific classification
- Kingdom: Animalia
- Phylum: Arthropoda
- Subphylum: Chelicerata
- Class: Arachnida
- Order: Araneae
- Infraorder: Mygalomorphae
- Family: Barychelidae
- Genus: Ozicrypta
- Species: O. pearni

Binomial name
- Ozicrypta pearni Raven & Churchill, 1994

Species of spider

Ozicrypta pearni is a species of mygalomorph spider in the Barychelidae family. It is endemic to Australia. It was described in 1994 by Australian arachnologists Robert Raven and Tracey Churchill. The specific epithet pearni honours Professor John Pearn, of the University of Queensland, for contributions to child health, medical history and arachnidism in Australia.

== Distribution and habitat ==
The species occurs in North Queensland in open eucalypt forest habitats. The type locality is the summit of Mount Cleveland, near Townsville.
