= Ozicrypta kroombit =

Scientific classification
- Kingdom: Animalia
- Phylum: Arthropoda
- Subphylum: Chelicerata
- Class: Arachnida
- Order: Araneae
- Infraorder: Mygalomorphae
- Family: Barychelidae
- Genus: Ozicrypta
- Species: O. kroombit

Binomial name
- Ozicrypta kroombit Raven & Churchill, 1994

Species of spider

Ozicrypta kroombit is a species of mygalomorph spider in the Barychelidae family. It is endemic to Australia. It was described in 1994 by Australian arachnologists Robert Raven and Tracey Churchill. The specific epithet kroombit refers to the type locality.

== Distribution and habitat ==
The species occurs in Central Queensland in montane rainforest. The type locality is Kroombit Tops, at an elevation of 1050 m.
