= Ozicrypta mcdonaldi =

Scientific classification
- Kingdom: Animalia
- Phylum: Arthropoda
- Subphylum: Chelicerata
- Class: Arachnida
- Order: Araneae
- Infraorder: Mygalomorphae
- Family: Barychelidae
- Genus: Ozicrypta
- Species: O. mcdonaldi

Binomial name
- Ozicrypta mcdonaldi Raven & Churchill, 1994

Species of spider

Ozicrypta mcdonaldi is a species of mygalomorph spider in the Barychelidae family. It is endemic to Australia. It was described in 1994 by Australian arachnologists Robert Raven and Tracey Churchill. The specific epithet mcdonaldi honours spider enthusiast Keith McDonald of the Queensland Parks and Wildlife Service.

== Distribution and habitat ==
The species occurs in South West Queensland in mulga grassland habitats. The type locality is Ambathala Station, about 100 km west-north-west of Charleville.
