= Ozicrypta clarki =

Scientific classification
- Kingdom: Animalia
- Phylum: Arthropoda
- Subphylum: Chelicerata
- Class: Arachnida
- Order: Araneae
- Infraorder: Mygalomorphae
- Family: Barychelidae
- Genus: Ozicrypta
- Species: O. clarki

Binomial name
- Ozicrypta clarki Raven & Churchill, 1994

Species of spider

Ozicrypta clarki is a species of mygalomorph spider in the Barychelidae family. It is endemic to Australia. It was described in 1994 by Australian arachnologists Robert Raven and Tracey Churchill. The specific epithet clarki honours Australian physicist Gregory John Clark, Director of Science and Technology at IBM Australia Ltd.

== Distribution and habitat ==
The species occurs in Queensland’s Torres Strait Islands in savanna woodland. The type locality is Terry Beach, Prince of Wales Island.
