= Trittame stonieri =

Scientific classification
- Kingdom: Animalia
- Phylum: Arthropoda
- Subphylum: Chelicerata
- Class: Arachnida
- Order: Araneae
- Infraorder: Mygalomorphae
- Family: Barychelidae
- Genus: Trittame
- Species: T. stonieri

Binomial name
- Trittame stonieri Raven, 1994

Species of spider

Trittame stonieri is a species of mygalomorph spider in the Barychelidae family. It is endemic to Australia. It was described in 1994 by Australian arachnologist Robert Raven. The specific epithet stonieri honours Russell Stonier, on whose land the type specimen was trapped.

== Distribution and habitat ==
The species occurs in Central Queensland, in the northern Brigalow Belt bioregion, in eucalypt forest habitats with a dense understorey. The type locality is Bondoola, near Rockhampton.
