= Ozicrypta reticulata =

Scientific classification
- Kingdom: Animalia
- Phylum: Arthropoda
- Subphylum: Chelicerata
- Class: Arachnida
- Order: Araneae
- Infraorder: Mygalomorphae
- Family: Barychelidae
- Genus: Ozicrypta
- Species: O. reticulata

Binomial name
- Ozicrypta reticulata (L.Koch, 1874)

Synonyms
- Idiommata reticulata L.Koch, 1874; Encyocrypta reticulata Pocock, 1895

Species of spider

Ozicrypta reticulata is a species of mygalomorph spider in the Barychelidae family. It is endemic to Australia. It was described in 1874 by German arachnologist Ludwig Carl Christian Koch.

== Distribution and habitat ==
The species occurs in North Queensland in rainforest habitats. The type locality is the Eungella National Park in the Clarke Range. Koch originally gave the type locality as “Sydney”, evidently an error, that has subsequently been corrected.

== Behaviour ==
The spiders are terrestrial predators.
