= Ozicrypta hollinsae =

Scientific classification
- Kingdom: Animalia
- Phylum: Arthropoda
- Subphylum: Chelicerata
- Class: Arachnida
- Order: Araneae
- Infraorder: Mygalomorphae
- Family: Barychelidae
- Genus: Ozicrypta
- Species: O. hollinsae

Binomial name
- Ozicrypta hollinsae Raven & Churchill, 1994

Species of spider

Ozicrypta hollinsae is a species of mygalomorph spider in the Barychelidae family. It is endemic to Australia. It was described in 1994 by Australian arachnologists Robert Raven and Tracey Churchill. The specific epithet hollinsae honours Chris Hollins for her cooperation in the Queensland Museum Spider Pitfall Trapping Program, 1990–1995.

== Description ==
The holotype male has a total length of 15 mm, a dark brown carapace 5.5 mm long by 4.62 mm wide, a mottled brown and white abdomen 7.06 mm long by 4.37 mm wide, and yellow-brown legs. The burrow is a lidded tube, 4–6 cm deep, constructed at the base of a eucalypt tree in plant litter. The egg-sac is a translucent sphere about 1 cm in diameter.

== Distribution and habitat ==
The species occurs in Central Queensland in open eucalypt forest habitats. The type locality is Mount Chalmers, just east of Rockhampton.
