= Trittame berniesmythi =

Scientific classification
- Kingdom: Animalia
- Phylum: Arthropoda
- Subphylum: Chelicerata
- Class: Arachnida
- Order: Araneae
- Infraorder: Mygalomorphae
- Family: Barychelidae
- Genus: Trittame
- Species: T. berniesmythi

Binomial name
- Trittame berniesmythi Raven, 1994

Species of spider

Trittame berniesmythi is a species of mygalomorph spider in the Barychelidae family. It is endemic to Australia. It was described in 1994 by Australian arachnologist Robert Raven. The specific epithet berniesmythi honours Bernie Smyth, who assisted with the collection of the holotype specimen.

== Distribution and habitat ==
The species occurs in Queensland in the southern Brigalow Belt bioregion. The type locality is cattle-grazed brigalow scrub habitat on Windermere Station, just south of Glenmorgan.
