= Ozicrypta wrightae =

Scientific classification
- Kingdom: Animalia
- Phylum: Arthropoda
- Subphylum: Chelicerata
- Class: Arachnida
- Order: Araneae
- Infraorder: Mygalomorphae
- Family: Barychelidae
- Genus: Ozicrypta
- Species: O. wrightae

Binomial name
- Ozicrypta wrightae Raven & Churchill, 1994

Species of spider

Ozicrypta wrightae is a species of mygalomorph spider in the Barychelidae family. It is endemic to Australia. It was described in 1994 by Australian arachnologists Robert Raven and Tracey Churchill. The specific epithet wrightae honours poet, naturalist and conservationist Judith Wright, a cofounder of the Wildlife Preservation Society of Queensland.

== Distribution and habitat ==
The species occurs in Far North Queensland in rainforest habitats. The type locality is the Bellenden Ker Range, at an elevation of 500 m, in the Wet Tropics of Queensland World Heritage Site.
