= Trittame rainbowi =

Scientific classification
- Kingdom: Animalia
- Phylum: Arthropoda
- Subphylum: Chelicerata
- Class: Arachnida
- Order: Araneae
- Infraorder: Mygalomorphae
- Family: Barychelidae
- Genus: Trittame
- Species: T. rainbowi

Binomial name
- Trittame rainbowi Raven, 1994

Species of spider

Trittame rainbowi is a species of mygalomorph spider in the Barychelidae family. It is endemic to Australia. It was described in 1994 by Australian arachnologist Robert Raven. The specific epithet rainbowi honours William Joseph Rainbow (1856–1919), entomologist at the Australian Museum, for contributions to arachnology.

== Distribution and habitat ==
The species occurs in north-east Queensland in rainforest habitats. The type locality is Mount Cleveland, near Townsville. It is also found on Mount Halifax in the Paluma Range.
