= Trittame bancrofti =

Scientific classification
- Kingdom: Animalia
- Phylum: Arthropoda
- Subphylum: Chelicerata
- Class: Arachnida
- Order: Araneae
- Infraorder: Mygalomorphae
- Family: Barychelidae
- Genus: Trittame
- Species: T. bancrofti

Binomial name
- Trittame bancrofti (Rainbow & Pulleine, 1918)

Synonyms
- Aganippe bancrofti Rainbow & Pulleine, 1918

Species of spider

Trittame bancrofti is a species of mygalomorph spider in the Barychelidae family. It is endemic to Australia. It was described in 1918 by Australian arachnologists William Joseph Rainbow and Robert Henry Pulleine.

== Distribution and habitat ==
The species occurs in south-eastern Queensland. The type locality is Eidsvold.
