= Ozicrypta eungella =

Scientific classification
- Kingdom: Animalia
- Phylum: Arthropoda
- Subphylum: Chelicerata
- Class: Arachnida
- Order: Araneae
- Infraorder: Mygalomorphae
- Family: Barychelidae
- Genus: Ozicrypta
- Species: O. eungella

Binomial name
- Ozicrypta eungella Raven & Churchill, 1994

Species of spider

Ozicrypta eungella is a species of mygalomorph spider in the Barychelidae family. It is endemic to Australia. It was described in 1994 by Australian arachnologists Robert Raven and Tracey Churchill. The specific epithet eungella refers to the type locality.

== Distribution and habitat ==
The species occurs in the Mackay Region of North Queensland in plant litter in rainforest habitats. The type locality is Eungella.
