= Ozicrypta tuckeri =

Scientific classification
- Kingdom: Animalia
- Phylum: Arthropoda
- Subphylum: Chelicerata
- Class: Arachnida
- Order: Araneae
- Infraorder: Mygalomorphae
- Family: Barychelidae
- Genus: Ozicrypta
- Species: O. tuckeri

Binomial name
- Ozicrypta tuckeri Raven & Churchill, 1994

Species of spider

Ozicrypta tuckeri is a species of mygalomorph spider in the Barychelidae family. It is endemic to Australia. It was described in 1994 by Australian arachnologists Robert Raven and Tracey Churchill. The specific epithet tuckeri honours Perc Tucker, Queensland politician and Mayor of Townsville, for contributions to the community.

== Distribution and habitat ==
The species occurs in North Queensland in rainforest habitats. The type locality is Mount Cleveland on Cape Cleveland, near Townsville.
