= Ozicrypta noonamah =

Scientific classification
- Kingdom: Animalia
- Phylum: Arthropoda
- Subphylum: Chelicerata
- Class: Arachnida
- Order: Araneae
- Infraorder: Mygalomorphae
- Family: Barychelidae
- Genus: Ozicrypta
- Species: O. noonamah

Binomial name
- Ozicrypta noonamah Raven & Churchill, 1994

Species of spider

Ozicrypta noonamah is a species of mygalomorph spider in the Barychelidae family. It is endemic to Australia. It was described in 1994 by Australian arachnologists Robert Raven and Tracey Churchill. The specific epithet noonamah refers to the type locality.

== Distribution and habitat ==
The species occurs in the Top End of the Northern Territory. The type locality is the Eva Valley Road, Noonamah, a rural outer suburb of Darwin.
