= Ozicrypta sinclairi =

Scientific classification
- Kingdom: Animalia
- Phylum: Arthropoda
- Subphylum: Chelicerata
- Class: Arachnida
- Order: Araneae
- Infraorder: Mygalomorphae
- Family: Barychelidae
- Genus: Ozicrypta
- Species: O. sinclairi

Binomial name
- Ozicrypta sinclairi Raven & Churchill, 1994

Species of spider

Ozicrypta sinclairi is a species of mygalomorph spider in the Barychelidae family. It is endemic to Australia. It was described in 1994 by Australian arachnologists Robert Raven and Tracey Churchill. The specific epithet sinclairi honours environmentalist John Sinclair, who helped preserve the rainforests of Fraser Island.

== Distribution and habitat ==
The species occurs in the Gladstone Region of Queensland in rainforest habitats. The type locality is Deepwater Creek, near Rosedale.
