= Trittame kochi =

Scientific classification
- Kingdom: Animalia
- Phylum: Arthropoda
- Subphylum: Chelicerata
- Class: Arachnida
- Order: Araneae
- Infraorder: Mygalomorphae
- Family: Barychelidae
- Genus: Trittame
- Species: T. kochi

Binomial name
- Trittame kochi Raven, 1990

Species of spider

Trittame kochi is a species of mygalomorph spider in the Barychelidae family. It is endemic to Australia. It was described in 1990 by Australian arachnologist Robert Raven.

== Distribution and habitat ==
The species occurs in Far North Queensland in lowland rainforest habitats at Mount Finlay, Fritz Creek and Cape Tribulation.
