= Ozicrypta filmeri =

Scientific classification
- Kingdom: Animalia
- Phylum: Arthropoda
- Subphylum: Chelicerata
- Class: Arachnida
- Order: Araneae
- Infraorder: Mygalomorphae
- Family: Barychelidae
- Genus: Ozicrypta
- Species: O. filmeri

Binomial name
- Ozicrypta filmeri Raven & Churchill, 1994

Species of spider

Ozicrypta filmeri is a species of mygalomorph spider in the Barychelidae family. It is endemic to Australia. It was described in 1994 by Australian arachnologists Robert Raven and Tracey Churchill. The specific epithet filmeri honours Ivor Filmer, Gympie naturalist and staff member of the Queensland Museum.

== Distribution and habitat ==
The species occurs in the Gympie Region and Conondale Range of south-east Queensland in rainforest habitats. The type locality is the Glastonbury State Forest, near the Widgee State Forest.
