= John Hemsley Pearn =

Australian paediatrician, soldier, former surgeon general

John Hemsley Pearn AO GCStJ RFD(Rtd), FRACP, FRCP(Lond), FRACP(Edin), FRACMA(Hon), FADI
- John Pearn 2019
- Education: Brisbane Grammar School, University of Queensland
- Occupations: Paediatrician, soldier
- Medical career
- Profession: Medicine, academia
- Awards: Member of the Order of Australia (1979), National Medal (1980), Centenary Medal (2001), Officer of the Order of Australia (2009), Bailiff Grand Cross, Order of St John (2014).

John Hemsley Pearn is an Australian retired paediatrician, soldier, former surgeon general of the Australian Defence Force, academic, historian, author, and educator.

== Early life and education ==
John Pearn attended Brisbane Grammar School, graduating in 1957. He was an active Boy Scout and in 1955 was awarded the Scout Cord.

Pearn completed a Bachelor of Science (BSc) degree from the University of Queensland, graduating with First Class Honours in Medicine and Surgery (MBBS) in 1964. He finished a Doctor of Medicine (MD) in 1969, with his thesis a study of the embryo-pathic effects of indospicine. He then went on to study spinal muscular atrophy for his PhD at the University of London.

== Career ==
John Pearn was appointed as a full-time staff member of the University of Queensland (UQ) in 1966, when he was working as a lecturer in the Department of Pathology. He later joined the Department of Child Health in 1968. In 1976, he was promoted to Reader in Child Health and in 1986, Pearn was appointed as Professor of Paediatrics and Child Health and served as Head of Department at UQ. Additionally, he was employed as a senior paediatrician at the Royal Children's Hospital, Brisbane (later merged into the Queensland Children's Hospital), from 1986 until his retirement in 2005. Pearn's clinical scope included general paediatrics, medical genetics, clinical toxicology, tropical medicine, accident prevention, and safety promotion.

Pearn established Queensland's first clinical genetics service in 1974 and continued to lead the service until the establishment of Queensland Clinical Genetics Service (now Genetic Health Queensland) in 1994.

Pearn is a founding member of the Human Genetics Society of Australasia. He has served as the vice president from 1981 to 1982 and as president from 1983 to 1985.

Pearn worked for over 40 years with St John Ambulance Australia. He also worked in successive Divisional and Corps appointments in the uniformed branch of St John, the St John Ambulance Brigade, later renamed the Operations Branch of St John Ambulance Australia. From 1967, Pearn assisted senior medical roles in the organisation, initially as Divisional Surgeon, then as Corps Surgeon, and finally as the District Surgeon for St John Ambulance Australia in Queensland. From 1984, he served as the Councillor of the Division and eventually became President of the organisation for 15 years. He has also worked for 10 years as the National Director of Training and a Member of the National Professional Standards Committee, sitting on the National Board from 1990 to 1999. For over 20 years, he was a senior editorial consultant for textbooks published by the organisation.

Pearn co-founded the Child Accident Prevention Foundation of Australia, now named Kidsafe, and served as the national Medical Adviser for 3 decades.

Pearn was a committee member of the International Society of the History of Medicine. He helped to establish the Australian Society of the History of Medicine, subsequently serving as vice president from 1993 to 1995 and as president from 1995 to 1997 and was awarded life membership to the society.

== Military career ==
Pearn served as a medical officer in the Royal Australian Army Medical Corps for 30 years. His postings included: medical officer of the University of Queensland Regiment, consultant physician in uniform for Australian and New Zealand forces during the 1970 Vietnam Campaign, regimental medical officer for the 4th Battalion (UK Parachute Regiment), and commanding officer of the Brisbane 2 Field Hospital (1979–1982). Pearn served as Colonel Consultant (Medical Research) in the Australian Directorate of Army Health Services in Canberra, Australia. During his military career, Pearn was deployed on active duty in the Vietnam War (1966–67) and during the Free Papua Movement (1978).

Pearn has also served in various non-Corps positions, including training officer of the New Guinea Volunteer Rifles and defence platoon commander of London's 4th Battalion, The Royal Green Jackets. Pearn volunteered for the North Atlantic Treaty Organisation (NATO) and was attached to the 17th/21st Lancers Arctic Squadron. In 1994–1995, Pearn volunteered as a physician-intensivist for the United Nations Peacekeeping and Humanitarian Force in the Forward Surgical Team, part of the Australian Medical Support Force in Rwanda's post-genocide emergency. He wrote a book on his experience in Rwanda entitled Reflections of Rwanda: A Selected Photo-archive of Service with the Forward Surgical Team, the Australian Medical Support Force, UNAMIR II, Rwanda. Pearn was became the rank of major general in the Australian Army as Surgeon-General of the Australian Defence Force (1997–2000).

== Scouting ==
Pearn continued working for the Scouting movement into adulthood, serving as a Councillor and as Vice President of the Queensland Branch. He also served as an Adviser on the 18th Australian Jamboree in First Aid provision and pre-hospital care from 1996 to 1998. In 1995, Pearn was appointed as Adviser to the Chief Commissioner of the Scouts' Child Protection Code of Conduct. He has been the author and editorial consultant for several books published by Scouts Australia. These have included "Youth Suicide Prevention – Parents Guide" (1997) and "A Parents Guide on Adolescent Health for Scouts Australia" (1999). He also authored several articles on the history of Scouting. In 2013, he became President of Scouts Australia and was subsequently awarded Life Membership to the organisation.

== Research ==
Pearn is a researcher and author in medicine and military history. He has published more than 700 peer-reviewed articles and over 60 books, conducted research in accident prevention and pre-hospital care, focusing on poisoned, envenomed, or near-drowned patients.

In 2010, Pearn completed a Master of Philosophy in history for a thesis titled Chaplaincy in the Royal Brisbane Hospitals: The Genesis and Evolution of Hospital Chaplaincy in a Queensland Hospital Complex.

== Honorary appointments ==
Pearn was appointed as patron to the University of Queensland Medical Society in 1991.

The Queensland Ambulance Service appointed Pearn as patron to their Kenneth James McPherson (KJM) Foundation in 2005.

== Awards and honours ==
Pearn has received more than 100 awards, both national and international, for services and contributions to healthcare. These have included The Ibn Al Jazzar Medal (Tunisia), 1998; The Ramsay Medal (UK, 2000); The Ireland Medal (2005); the Commemoration Medal (425 years) of the National University of Mexico (2007); the 50th Anniversary Independence Medal (Papua New Guinea, 2010); The Gold Medal of the American Biographic Institute; The Esteemed Visitors Medal (The Uniformed Services University of the Health Sciences, USA); Honorary Membership of Alpha Omega Alpha for contributions to international medicine and humanitarianism; and the Macdonald Critchley Gold Medal (London, 2016).

=== Biology ===
The plant species Androcalva pearnii was named after Pearn, in recognition of his work in medicine and botany.

Additionally, a species of spider is named in his honour, Ozicrypta pearni, in recognition of his research on child health, medical history, and spider bite in Australia.

=== International ===
In 2014, Pearn was invested in the Order of St John, being awarded the Bailiff Grand Cross for St John Ambulance.

In 2016, Pearn was personally presented the King Edward VII Cup for outstanding international service to lifesaving by Her Majesty, Queen Elizabeth II.

=== National and State Awards ===
Pearn was awarded Member of the Order of Australia (AM) in the Australian 1979 Queen's Birthday Honours List for services to medicine, particularly in the field of child health.

In 1980, Pearn was awarded the Australian National Medal for services to the Australian Defence Force.

In 1994, Pearn was chosen as Queensland's "Father of the Year."

The Queensland Branch of the Australian Dental Association conferred the Award of Merit upon Pearn in 2000 in recognition of his many supportive roles in the field of dentistry. In 2007, Pearn was admitted as an honorary Fellow of the Academy of Dentistry International.

Pearn was awarded the Australian Centenary Medal in 2001 for distinguished service in paediatrics and other medical fields.

In 2002, Pearn was awarded the prestigious Howard Williams Medal by the Division of Paediatrics and Child Health of the Royal Australasian College of Physicians.

The International Life Saving Federation awarded Pearn their Medal for Meritorious Service in honour of his work in the area of childhood drowning and prevention.

Pearn was recognised as The University of Queensland's Alumnus of the Year for 2004.

Prof Pearn was awarded Queensland's Senior Australian of the Year in 2005.

In 2006, Pearn was awarded a Fellowship from the Australian Medical Association.

In 2009, Pearn was promoted to Officer of the Order of Australia (AO), for service to medicine, particularly in the areas of paediatrics and medical ethics, to medical history, and the community through injury prevention and first aid programs, in the Queen's Birthday Honours List.

Pearn was elected to be a Queensland Australia Day Ambassador in 2013.

Pearn was admitted to emeritus membership of the Human Genetics Society of Australasia, an honour reserved for only the society's most senior and accomplished members who have made an outstanding contribution to the field of human genetics and to society.

=== Orations ===
In 1991, Prof Pearn was the Bancroft Orator for the Queensland Branch of the Australian Medical Association and was presented with the Bancroft Medal. Pearn delivered the Cilento Oration for The Royal Australasian College of Medical Administrators in 1994. The Human Genetics Society of Australasia invited Pearn to deliver its annual event, the HGSA Oration, in 2011.

In 1995, Pearn was invited to deliver the Sherrington Oration at The University of Oxford on the topic "Humanitarianism at War" after three decades of service as a combat medic in the Royal Australian Army Medical Corps.

=== Medals ===
- Bancroft Medal (1991, Australian Medical Association)
- Herbert Moran Medal (Royal Australasian College of Surgeons)
- Ashdown Medal (Australasian College of Tropical Medicine)
- Gold Medal (American Biographical Institute)
