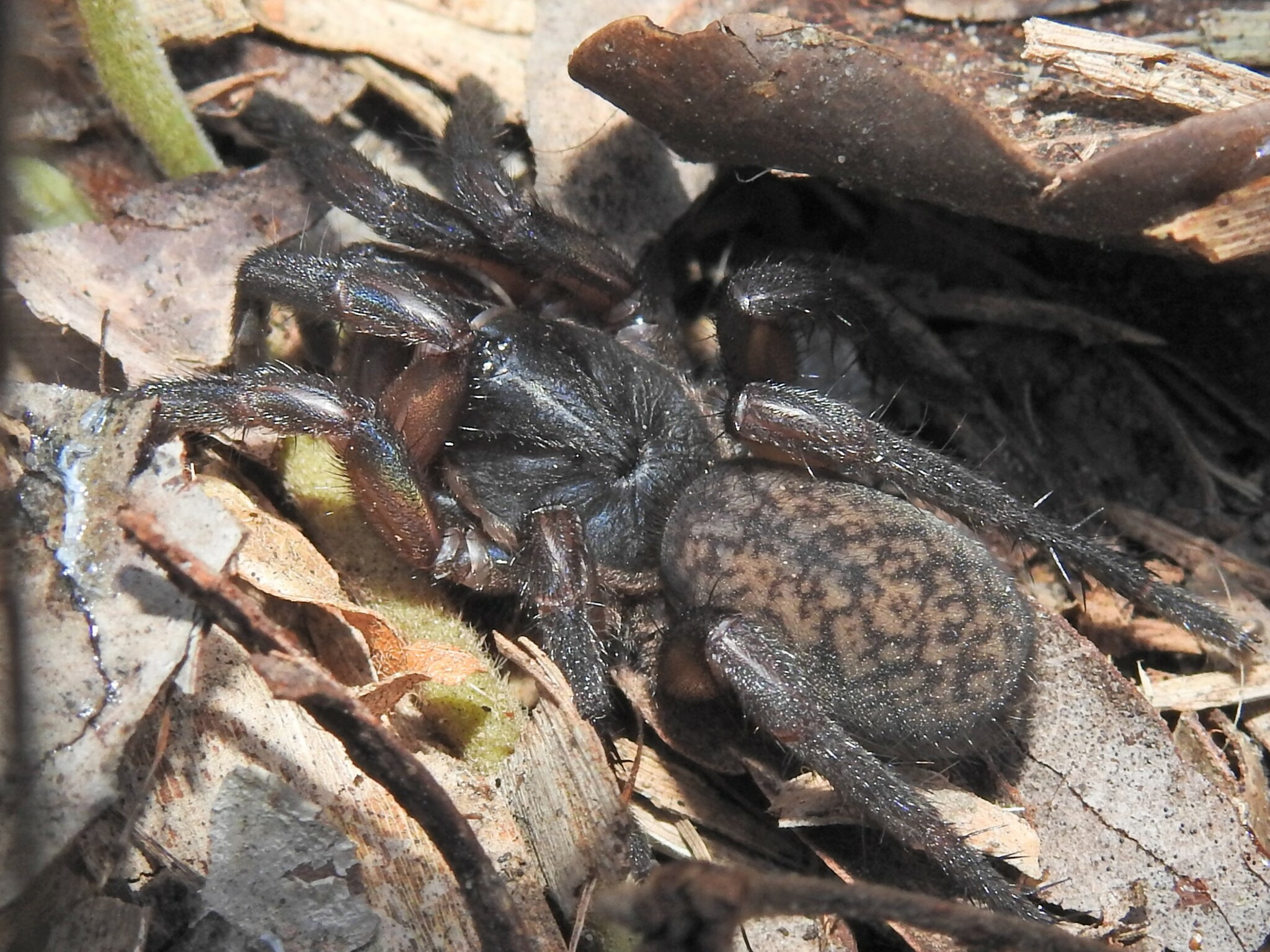
- O. cooloola

Scientific classification
- Kingdom: Animalia
- Phylum: Arthropoda
- Subphylum: Chelicerata
- Class: Arachnida
- Order: Araneae
- Infraorder: Mygalomorphae
- Family: Barychelidae
- Genus: Ozicrypta; Raven, 1994

Type species
- O. cooloola Raven & Churchill, 1994

Species
- 25, see text

= Ozicrypta =

Genus of spiders

Ozicrypta is a genus of Australian brushed trapdoor spiders first described by Robert Raven in 1994.

== Distribution ==
Species in this genus are only found in the Northern Territory (NT) or Queensland (QLD).

== Species ==
As of October 2025, this genus includes 25 species.

=== Species endemic to Queensland ===
- Ozicrypta clarki Raven & Churchill, 1994
- Ozicrypta clyneae Raven & Churchill, 1994
- Ozicrypta combeni Raven & Churchill, 1994
- Ozicrypta cooloola Raven & Churchill, 1994 (type species)
- Ozicrypta digglesi Raven & Churchill, 1994
- Ozicrypta etna Raven & Churchill, 1994
- Ozicrypta eungella Raven & Churchill, 1994
- Ozicrypta filmeri Raven & Churchill, 1994
- Ozicrypta hollinsae Raven & Churchill, 1994
- Ozicrypta kroombit Raven & Churchill, 1994
- Ozicrypta lawlessi Raven & Churchill, 1994
- Ozicrypta littleorum Raven & Churchill, 1994
- Ozicrypta mcarthurae Raven & Churchill, 1994
- Ozicrypta mcdonaldi Raven & Churchill, 1994
- Ozicrypta microcauda Raven & Churchill, 1994
- Ozicrypta palmarum (Hogg, 1901)
- Ozicrypta pearni Raven & Churchill, 1994
- Ozicrypta reticulata (L. Koch, 1874)
- Ozicrypta sinclairi Raven & Churchill, 1994
- Ozicrypta tuckeri Raven & Churchill, 1994
- Ozicrypta walkeri Raven & Churchill, 1994
- Ozicrypta wallacei Raven & Churchill, 1994
- Ozicrypta wrightae Raven & Churchill, 1994

=== Species endemic to Northern Territory ===
- Ozicrypta australoborealis Raven & Churchill, 1994
- Ozicrypta noonamah Raven & Churchill, 1994
