= Monodontium =

Scientific classification
- Domain: Eukaryota
- Kingdom: Animalia
- Phylum: Arthropoda
- Subphylum: Chelicerata
- Class: Arachnida
- Order: Araneae
- Infraorder: Mygalomorphae
- Family: Barychelidae
- Genus: Monodontium; Kulczyński, 1908

Type species
- M. mutabile Kulczyński, 1908

Species
- 5, see text

Genus of spiders

Monodontium is a genus of brushed trapdoor spiders first described by Władysław Kulczyński in 1908.

== Species ==
As of April 2019 it contains five species:

- Monodontium bukittimah Raven, 2008 – Singapore
- Monodontium malkini Raven, 2008 – New Guinea
- Monodontium mutabile Kulczyński, 1908 (type) – New Guinea
- Monodontium sarawak Raven, 2008 – Borneo
- Monodontium tetrathela Kulczyński, 1908 – New Guinea
