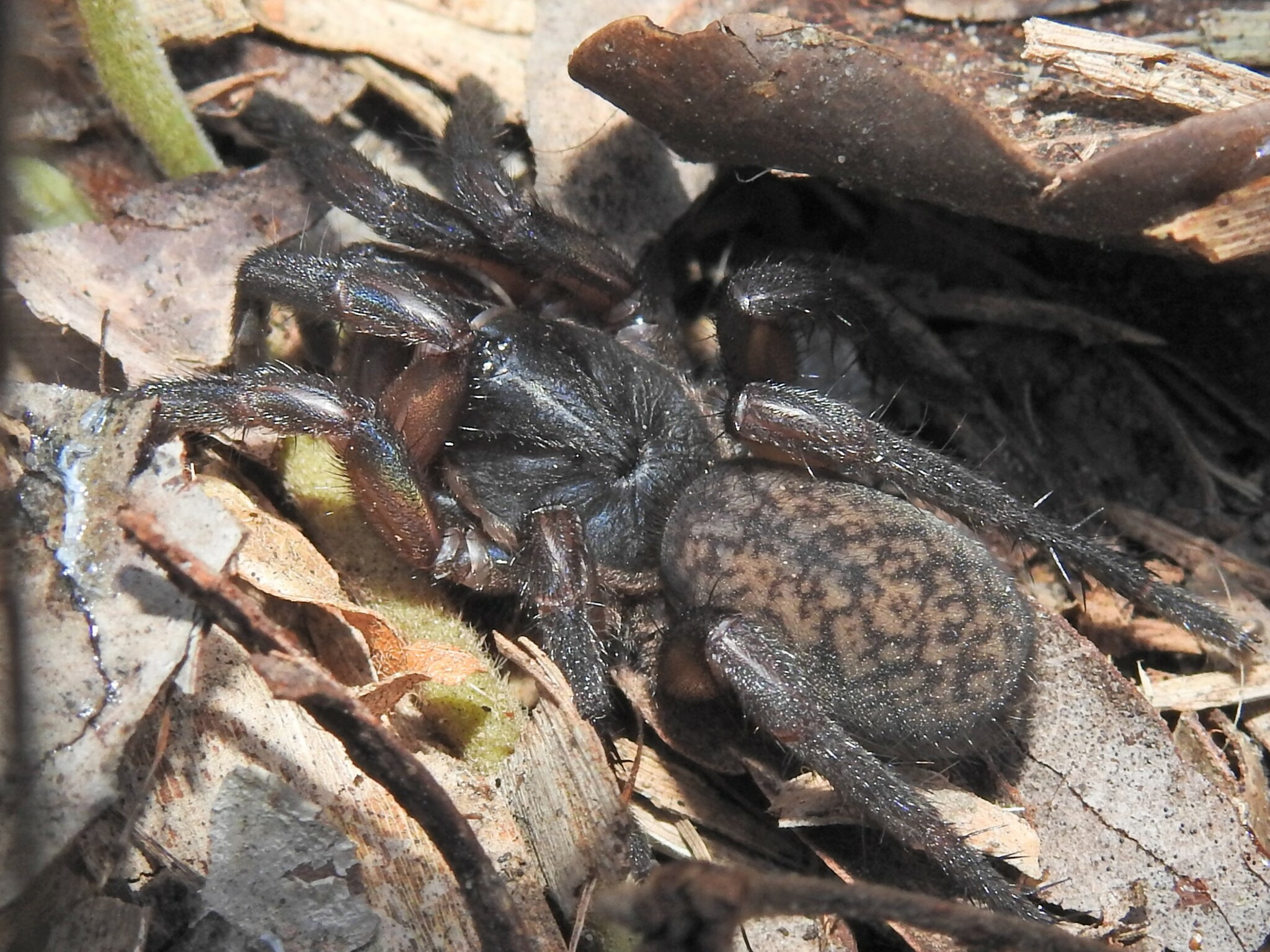

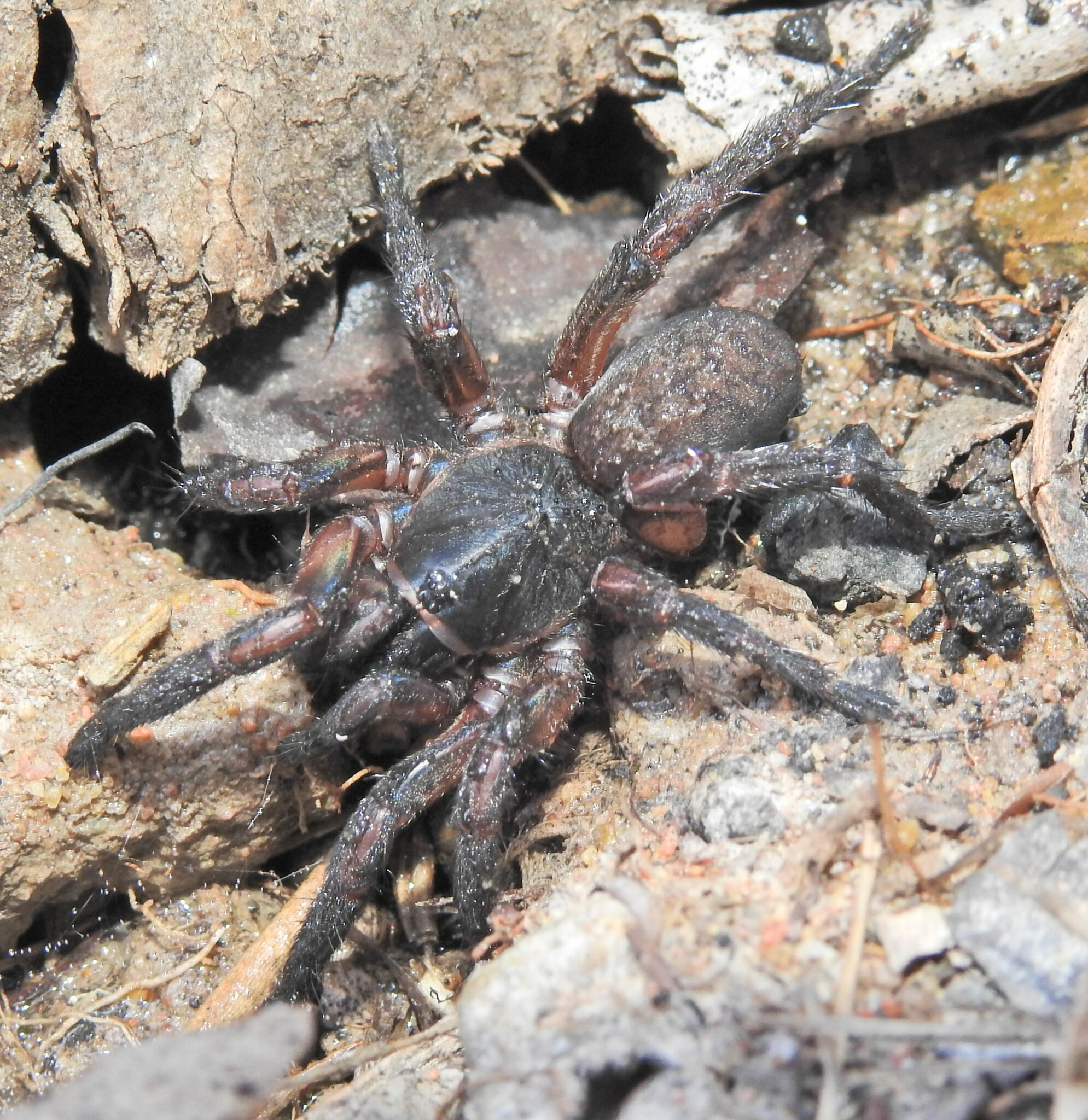

Scientific classification
- Kingdom: Animalia
- Phylum: Arthropoda
- Subphylum: Chelicerata
- Class: Arachnida
- Order: Araneae
- Infraorder: Mygalomorphae
- Family: Barychelidae
- Genus: Ozicrypta
- Species: O. cooloola

Binomial name
- Ozicrypta cooloola Raven & Churchill, 1994

= Ozicrypta cooloola =

Species of spider

Ozicrypta cooloola is a species of mygalomorph spider in the Barychelidae family. It is endemic to Australia. It was described in 1994 by Australian arachnologists Robert Raven and Tracey Churchill. The specific epithet cooloola, an Aboriginal term for ‘cypress-pine’, refers to the type locality.

== Distribution and habitat ==
The species occurs in the Gympie Region of south-east Queensland in rainforest habitats on sandy coastal soils. The known range extends from the Great Sandy National Park and Fraser Island southwards to Noosa, Nambour and Pomona. The type locality is Freshwater Road in Cooloola.
