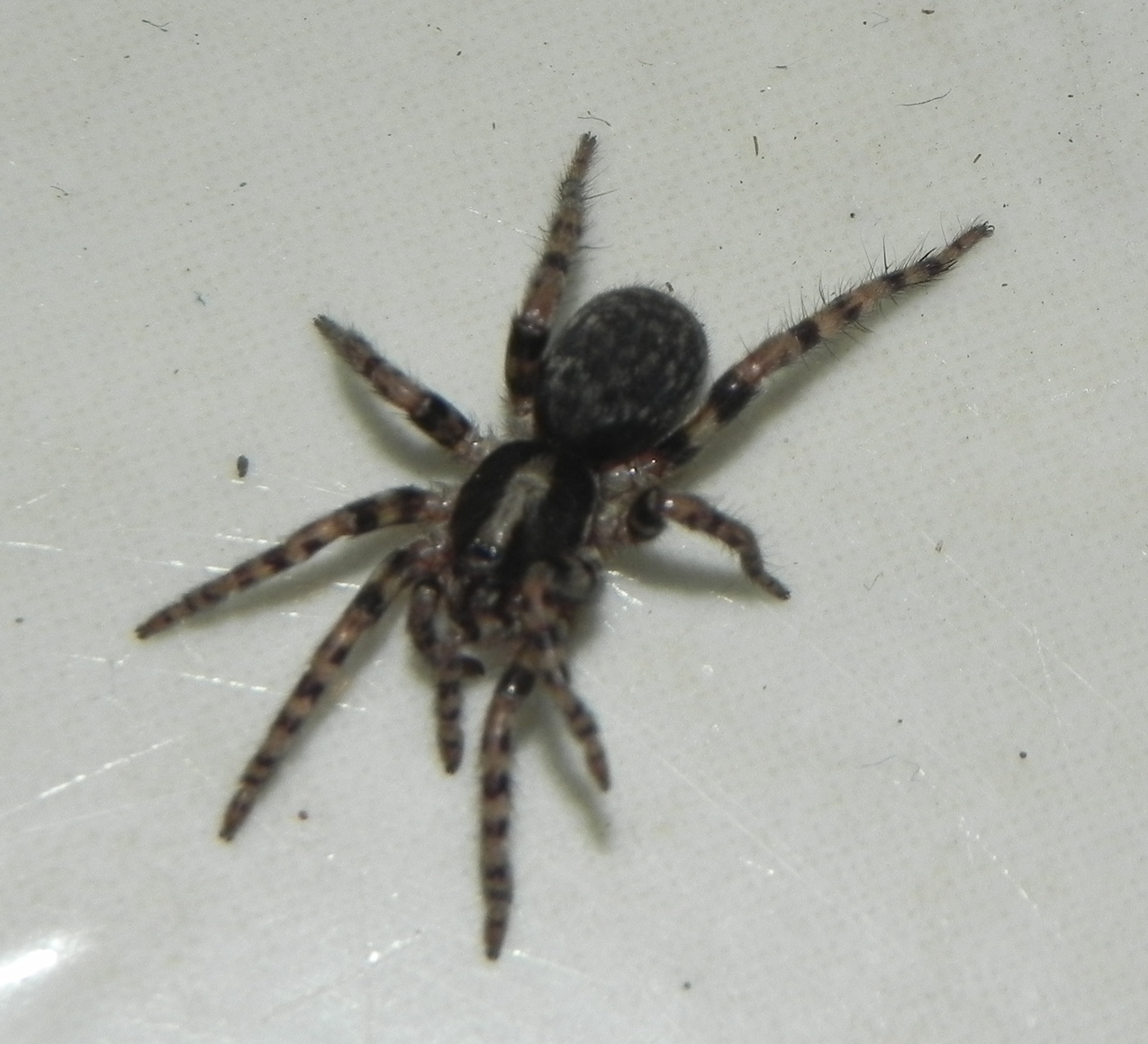
- N. fluminensis in Brazil

Scientific classification
- Kingdom: Animalia
- Phylum: Arthropoda
- Subphylum: Chelicerata
- Class: Arachnida
- Order: Araneae
- Infraorder: Mygalomorphae
- Family: Barychelidae
- Genus: Neodiplothele; Mello-Leitão, 1917

Type species
- N. irregularis Mello-Leitão, 1917

Species
- 9, see text

= Neodiplothele =

Genus of spiders

Neodiplothele is a genus of South American brushed trapdoor spiders first described by Cândido Firmino de Mello-Leitão in 1917.

== Distribution ==
All described species in this genus are endemic to Brazil.

== Species ==
As of October 2025, this genus includes nine species:

- Neodiplothele aureus Gonzalez-Filho, Lucas & Brescovit, 2015 – Brazil
- Neodiplothele caucaia Gonzalez-Filho, Lucas & Brescovit, 2015 – Brazil
- Neodiplothele flavicoma (Simon, 1891) – Brazil
- Neodiplothele fluminensis Mello-Leitão, 1924 – Brazil
- Neodiplothele indicattii Gonzalez-Filho, Lucas & Brescovit, 2015 – Brazil
- Neodiplothele irregularis Mello-Leitão, 1917 – Brazil (type species)
- Neodiplothele itabaiana Gonzalez-Filho, Lucas & Brescovit, 2015 – Brazil
- Neodiplothele martinsi Gonzalez-Filho, Lucas & Brescovit, 2015 – Brazil
- Neodiplothele picta Vellard, 1924 – Brazil
