= Orstom =

Scientific classification
- Domain: Eukaryota
- Kingdom: Animalia
- Phylum: Arthropoda
- Subphylum: Chelicerata
- Class: Arachnida
- Order: Araneae
- Infraorder: Mygalomorphae
- Family: Barychelidae
- Genus: Orstom; Raven, 1994

Type species
- O. chazeaui Raven & Churchill, 1994

Species
- 6, see text

Genus of spiders

Orstom is a genus of South Pacific brushed trapdoor spiders first described by Robert Raven in 1994.

== Species ==
As of April 2019 it contains six species, all found in New Caledonia:

- Orstom aoupinie Raven, 1994 – New Caledonia
- Orstom chazeaui Raven & Churchill, 1994 (type) – New Caledonia
- Orstom hydratemei Raven & Churchill, 1994 – New Caledonia
- Orstom macmillani Raven, 1994 – New Caledonia
- Orstom tropicus Raven, 1994 – New Caledonia
- Orstom undecimatus Raven, 1994 – New Caledonia
