= Cosmopelma =

Scientific classification
- Kingdom: Animalia
- Phylum: Arthropoda
- Subphylum: Chelicerata
- Class: Arachnida
- Order: Araneae
- Infraorder: Mygalomorphae
- Family: Barychelidae
- Genus: Cosmopelma; Simon, 1889

Type species
- C. decoratum Simon, 1889

Species
- C. ceplac Mori & Bertani, 2016 – Brazil; C. decoratum Simon, 1889 – Brazil

Genus of spiders

Cosmopelma is a genus of South American brushed trapdoor spiders first described by Eugène Simon in 1889. As of April 2019 it contains only two species, both found in Brazil.
