= Cyphonisia =

Scientific classification
- Kingdom: Animalia
- Phylum: Arthropoda
- Subphylum: Chelicerata
- Class: Arachnida
- Order: Araneae
- Infraorder: Mygalomorphae
- Family: Barychelidae
- Genus: Cyphonisia; Simon, 1889

Type species
- C. obesa Simon, 1889

Species
- 13, see text

Synonyms
- Pisenorina Benoit, 1966; Pisenorodes Pocock, 1898

Genus of spiders

Cyphonisia is a genus of African brushed trapdoor spiders first described by Eugène Simon in 1889.

== Species ==
As of April 2019 it contains thirteen species:

- Cyphonisia affinitata Strand, 1907 – East Africa
- Cyphonisia annulata Benoit, 1966 – Ghana
- Cyphonisia itombwensis Benoit, 1966 – Congo
- Cyphonisia kissi (Benoit, 1966) – Congo
- Cyphonisia maculata (Roewer, 1953) – Congo
- Cyphonisia maculipes Strand, 1906 – Cameroon
- Cyphonisia manicata Simon, 1907 – Equatorial Guinea (Bioko)
- Cyphonisia nesiotes Simon, 1907 – São Tomé and Príncipe
- Cyphonisia nigella (Simon, 1889) – Congo
- Cyphonisia obesa Simon, 1889 (type) – West, Central Africa
- Cyphonisia rastellata Strand, 1907 – East Africa
- Cyphonisia soleata Thorell, 1899 – Cameroon
- Cyphonisia straba Benoit, 1966 – Congo
