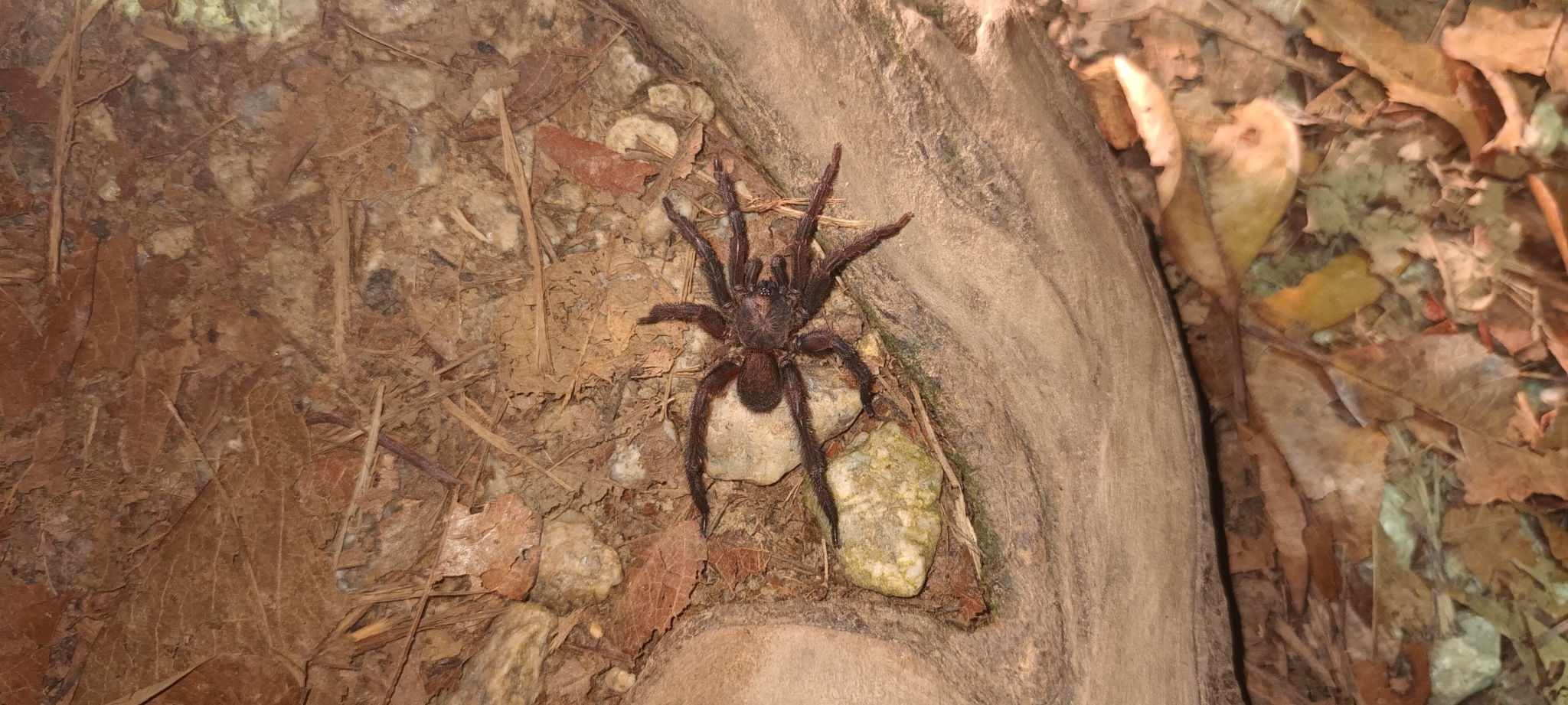

Scientific classification
- Kingdom: Animalia
- Phylum: Arthropoda
- Subphylum: Chelicerata
- Class: Arachnida
- Order: Araneae
- Infraorder: Mygalomorphae
- Family: Barychelidae
- Genus: Rhianodes; Raven, 1985
- Species: R. atratus

Binomial name
- Rhianodes atratus (Thorell, 1890)

Synonyms
- Idioctis sierramadrensis (Barrion & Litsinger, 1995)

= Rhianodes =

Genus of spiders

Rhianodes is a monotypic genus of Southeast Asian brushed trapdoor spiders containing the single species, Rhianodes atratus. It was first described by Robert Raven in 1985, and was later renamed to "Rhianodes" because the name was already attributed to a genus of weevils in the subfamily Apostasimerini. These spiders have only been found in Malaysia, Singapore, and Philippines.
