= Idiophthalma =

Scientific classification
- Domain: Eukaryota
- Kingdom: Animalia
- Phylum: Arthropoda
- Subphylum: Chelicerata
- Class: Arachnida
- Order: Araneae
- Infraorder: Mygalomorphae
- Family: Barychelidae
- Genus: Idiophthalma; O. Pickard-Cambridge, 1877

Type species
- I. suspecta O. Pickard-Cambridge, 1877

Species
- 5, see text

Genus of spiders

Idiophthalma is a genus of South American brushed trapdoor spiders first described by O. Pickard-Cambridge in 1877.

== Species ==
As of April 2019 it contains five species:

- Idiophthalma amazonica Simon, 1889 – Brazil
- Idiophthalma ecuadorensis Berland, 1913 – Ecuador
- Idiophthalma pantherina Simon, 1889 – Venezuela
- Idiophthalma robusta Simon, 1889 – Ecuador
- Idiophthalma suspecta O. Pickard-Cambridge, 1877 (type) – Colombia
