= Strophaeus =

Scientific classification
- Kingdom: Animalia
- Phylum: Arthropoda
- Subphylum: Chelicerata
- Class: Arachnida
- Order: Araneae
- Infraorder: Mygalomorphae
- Family: Barychelidae
- Genus: Strophaeus; Ausserer, 1875

Type species
- S. kochi (O. Pickard-Cambridge, 1870)

Species
- 4, see text

Synonyms
- Homoeoplacis Simon, 1892

Genus of spiders

Strophaeus is a genus of brushed trapdoor spiders first described by Anton Ausserer in 1875.

== Species ==
As of April 2019 it contains four species:

- Strophaeus austeni (F. O. Pickard-Cambridge, 1896) – Brazil
- Strophaeus kochi (O. Pickard-Cambridge, 1870) (type) – Peru
- Strophaeus pentodon (Simon, 1892) – Brazil
- Strophaeus sebastiani (Miranda & Bermúdez, 2010) – Panama
