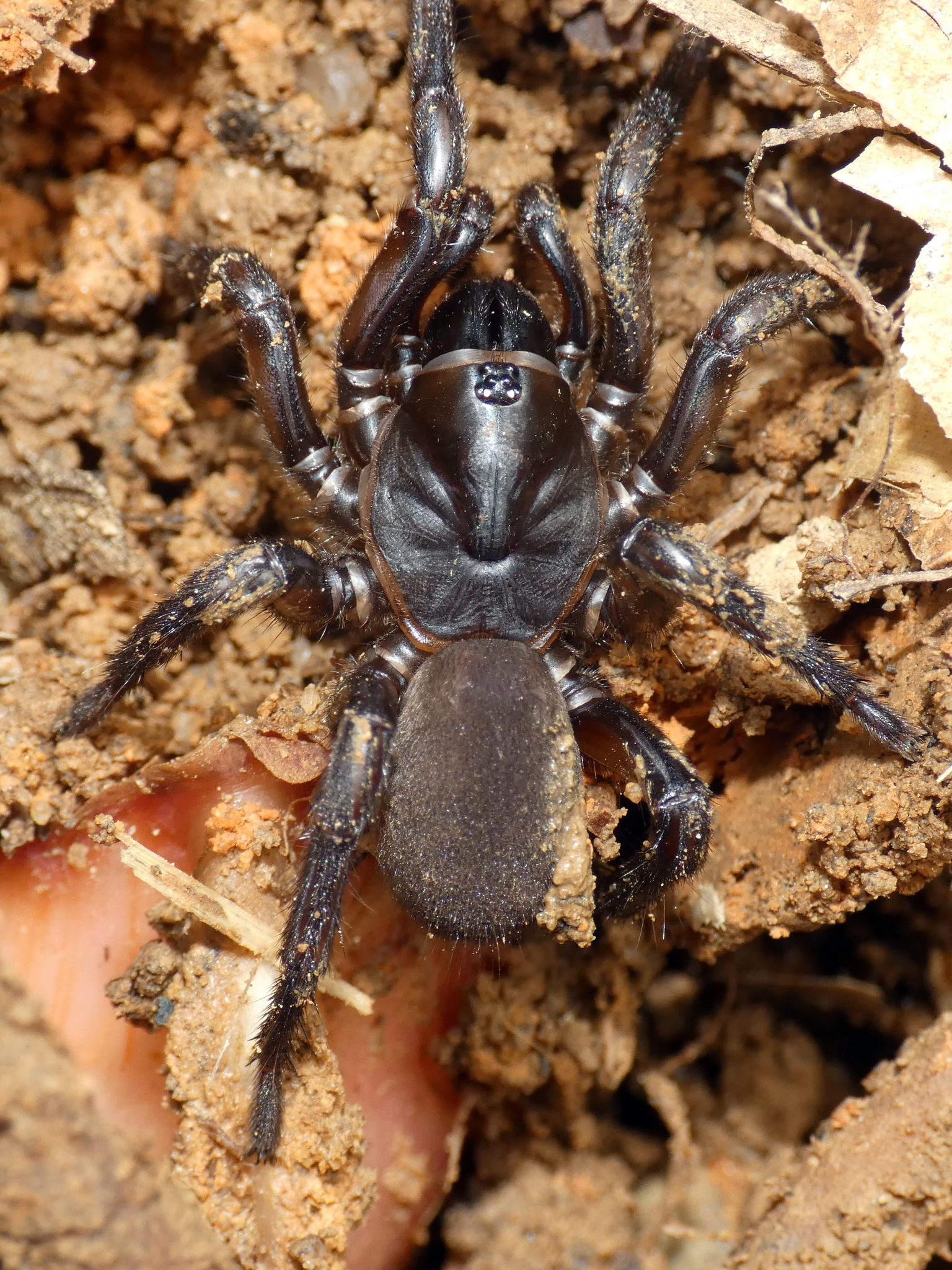

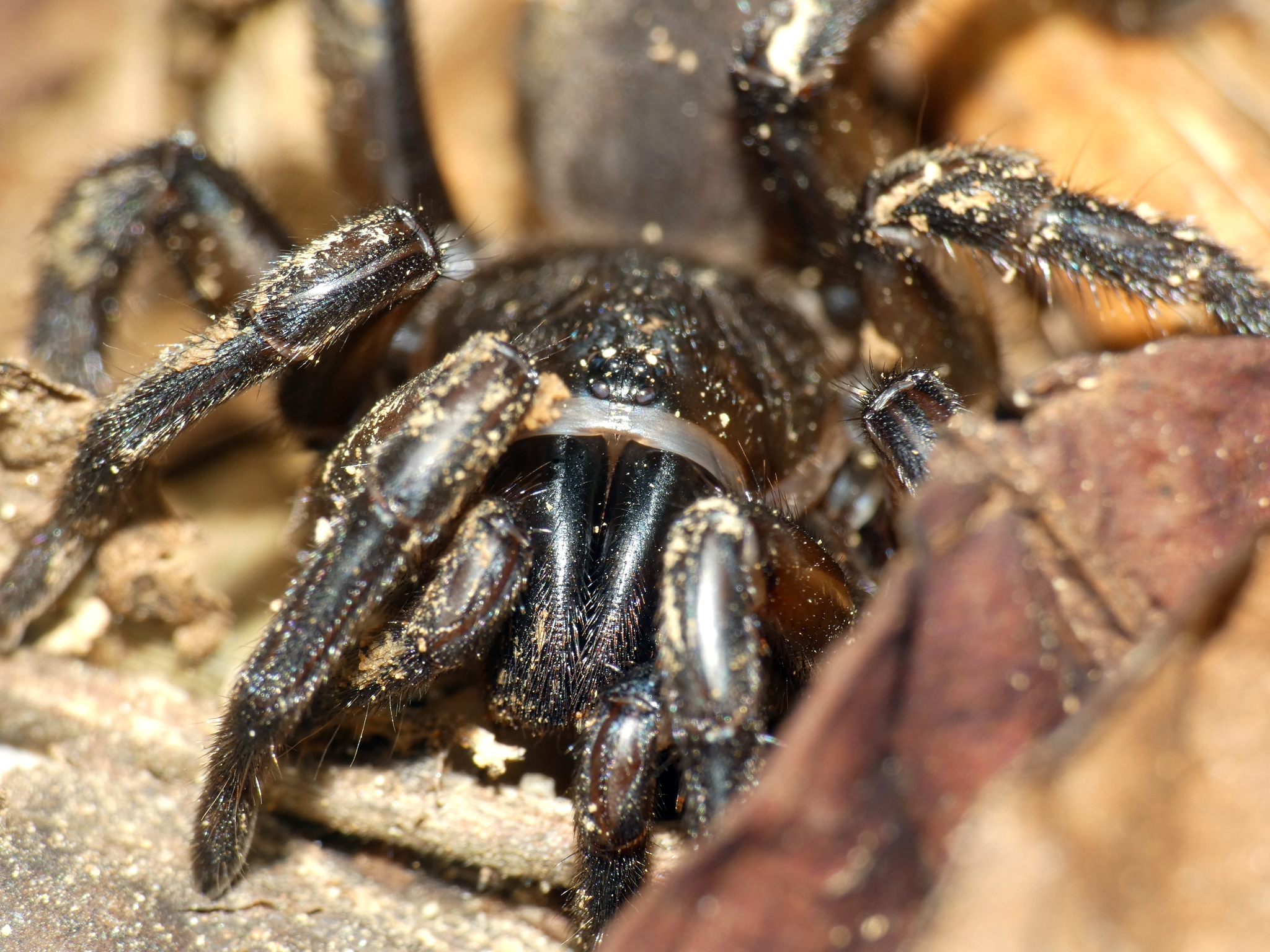

Scientific classification
- Kingdom: Animalia
- Phylum: Arthropoda
- Subphylum: Chelicerata
- Class: Arachnida
- Order: Araneae
- Infraorder: Mygalomorphae
- Family: Barychelidae
- Genus: Trittame
- Species: T. loki

Binomial name
- Trittame loki Raven, 1990

= Trittame loki =

Species of spider

Trittame loki is a species of mygalomorph spider in the Barychelidae family. It is endemic to Australia. It was described in 1990 by Australian arachnologist Robert Raven.

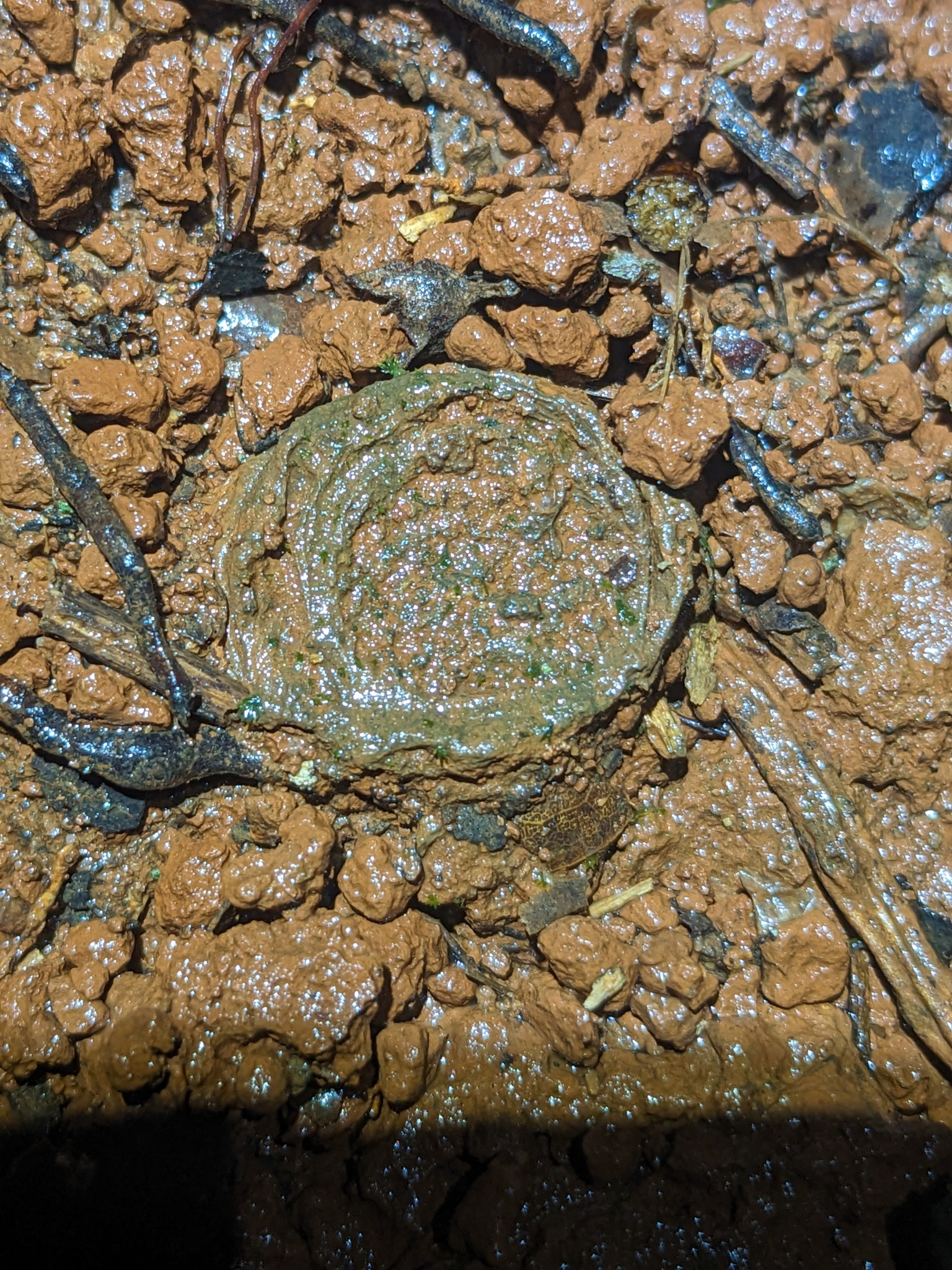

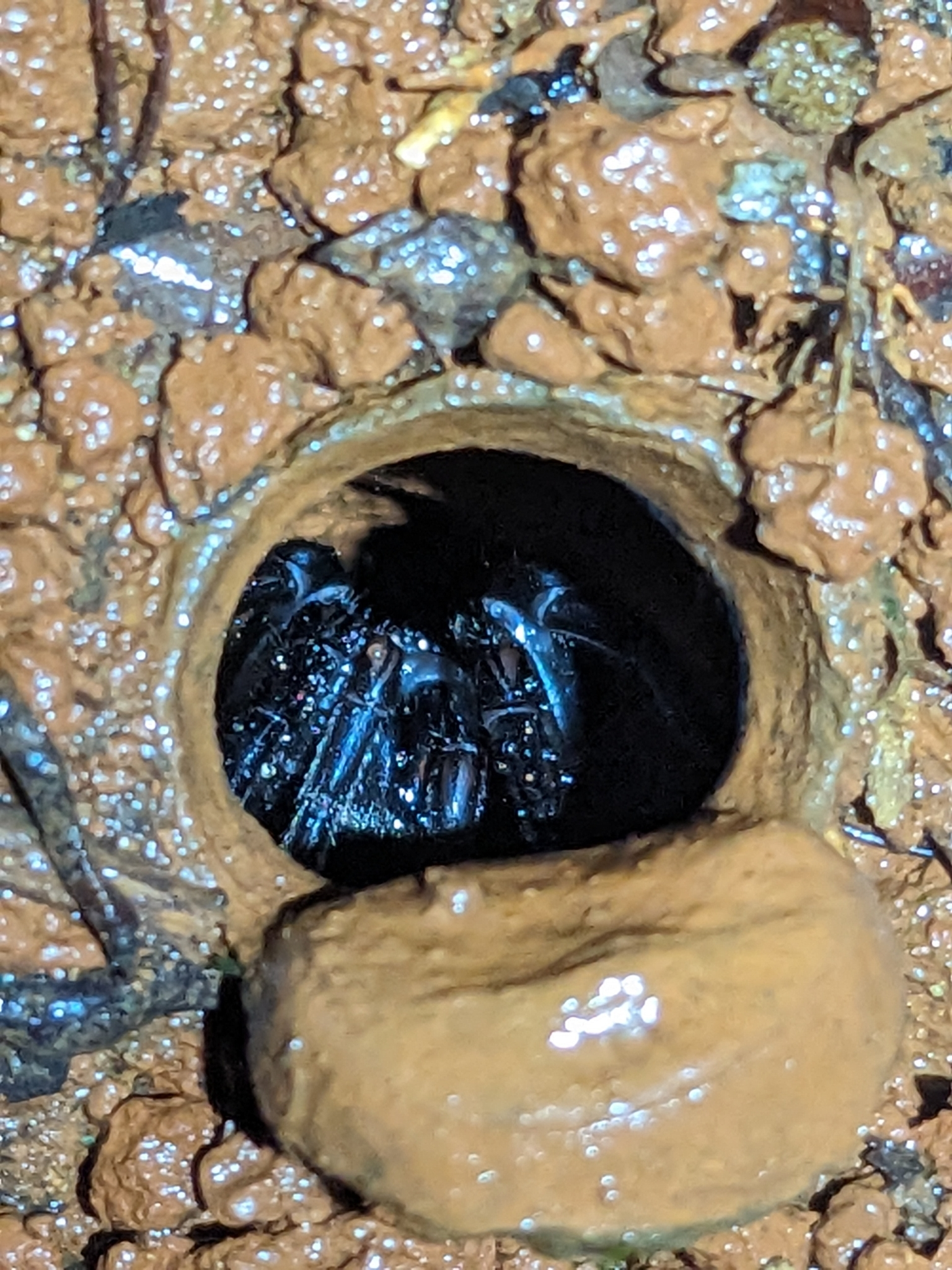

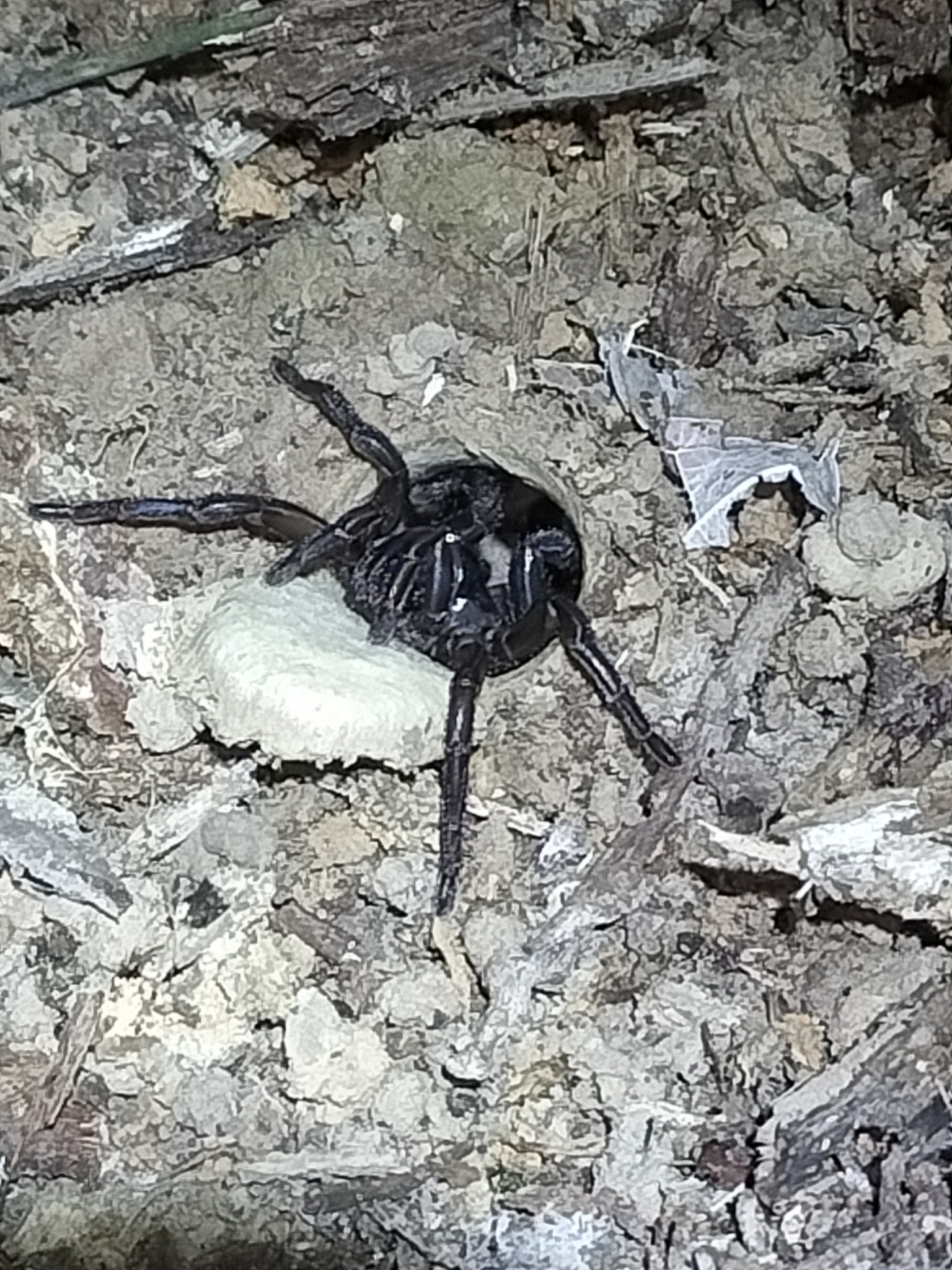

== Distribution and habitat ==
The species occurs in north-east Queensland in rainforest habitats from Cape Tribulation, Mount Windsor, Mount Hartley near Wujal Wujal and Crystal Cascades near Cairns, to the Paluma Range and Garradunga.
