= Encyocrypta =

Scientific classification
- Kingdom: Animalia
- Phylum: Arthropoda
- Subphylum: Chelicerata
- Class: Arachnida
- Order: Araneae
- Infraorder: Mygalomorphae
- Family: Barychelidae
- Genus: Encyocrypta; Simon, 1889

Type species
- E. meleagris Simon, 1889

Species
- 32, see text

Genus of spiders

Encyocrypta is a genus of South Pacific brushed trapdoor spiders first described by Eugène Simon in 1889.

== Species ==
As of April 2019 it contains thirty-two species, all found on New Caledonia:

- Encyocrypta abelardi Raven, 1994 – New Caledonia
- Encyocrypta aureco Raven & Churchill, 1991 – New Caledonia
- Encyocrypta berlandi Raven & Churchill, 1991 – New Caledonia
- Encyocrypta bertini Raven, 1994 – New Caledonia
- Encyocrypta bouleti Raven, 1994 – New Caledonia
- Encyocrypta cagou Raven & Churchill, 1991 – New Caledonia
- Encyocrypta colemani Raven & Churchill, 1991 – New Caledonia
- Encyocrypta decooki Raven & Churchill, 1991 – New Caledonia
- Encyocrypta djiaouma Raven & Churchill, 1991 – New Caledonia
- Encyocrypta eneseff Raven & Churchill, 1991 – New Caledonia
- Encyocrypta gracilibulba Raven, 1994 – New Caledonia
- Encyocrypta grandis Raven, 1994 – New Caledonia
- Encyocrypta heloiseae Raven, 1994 – New Caledonia
- Encyocrypta koghi Raven & Churchill, 1991 – New Caledonia
- Encyocrypta kone Raven & Churchill, 1991 – New Caledonia
- Encyocrypta kottae Raven & Churchill, 1991 – New Caledonia
- Encyocrypta kritscheri Raven & Churchill, 1991 – New Caledonia
- Encyocrypta kwakwa Raven, 1994 – New Caledonia
- Encyocrypta letocarti Raven & Churchill, 1991 – New Caledonia
- Encyocrypta lugubris Raven & Churchill, 1991 – New Caledonia
- Encyocrypta mckeei Raven, 1994 – New Caledonia
- Encyocrypta meleagris Simon, 1889 (type) – New Caledonia
- Encyocrypta montdo Raven & Churchill, 1991 – New Caledonia
- Encyocrypta montmou Raven & Churchill, 1991 – New Caledonia
- Encyocrypta neocaledonica Raven & Churchill, 1991 – New Caledonia
- Encyocrypta niaouli Raven & Churchill, 1991 – New Caledonia
- Encyocrypta ouazangou Raven, 1994 – New Caledonia
- Encyocrypta oubatche Raven & Churchill, 1991 – New Caledonia
- Encyocrypta panie Raven & Churchill, 1991 – New Caledonia
- Encyocrypta risbeci Raven, 1994 – New Caledonia
- Encyocrypta tillieri Raven & Churchill, 1991 – New Caledonia
- Encyocrypta tindia Raven & Churchill, 1991 – New Caledonia
