= Barycheloides =

Scientific classification
- Domain: Eukaryota
- Kingdom: Animalia
- Phylum: Arthropoda
- Subphylum: Chelicerata
- Class: Arachnida
- Order: Araneae
- Infraorder: Mygalomorphae
- Family: Barychelidae
- Genus: Barycheloides; Raven, 1994

Type species
- B. alluviophilus Raven, 1994

Species
- 5, see text

Genus of spiders

Barycheloides is a genus of South Pacific brushed trapdoor spiders first described by Robert Raven in 1994.

== Species ==
As of April 2019 it contains five species, all found on New Caledonia:

- Barycheloides alluviophilus Raven, 1994 (type) – New Caledonia
- Barycheloides chiropterus Raven, 1994 – New Caledonia
- Barycheloides concavus Raven, 1994 – New Caledonia
- Barycheloides rouxi (Berland, 1924) – New Caledonia
- Barycheloides rufofemoratus Raven, 1994 – New Caledonia
