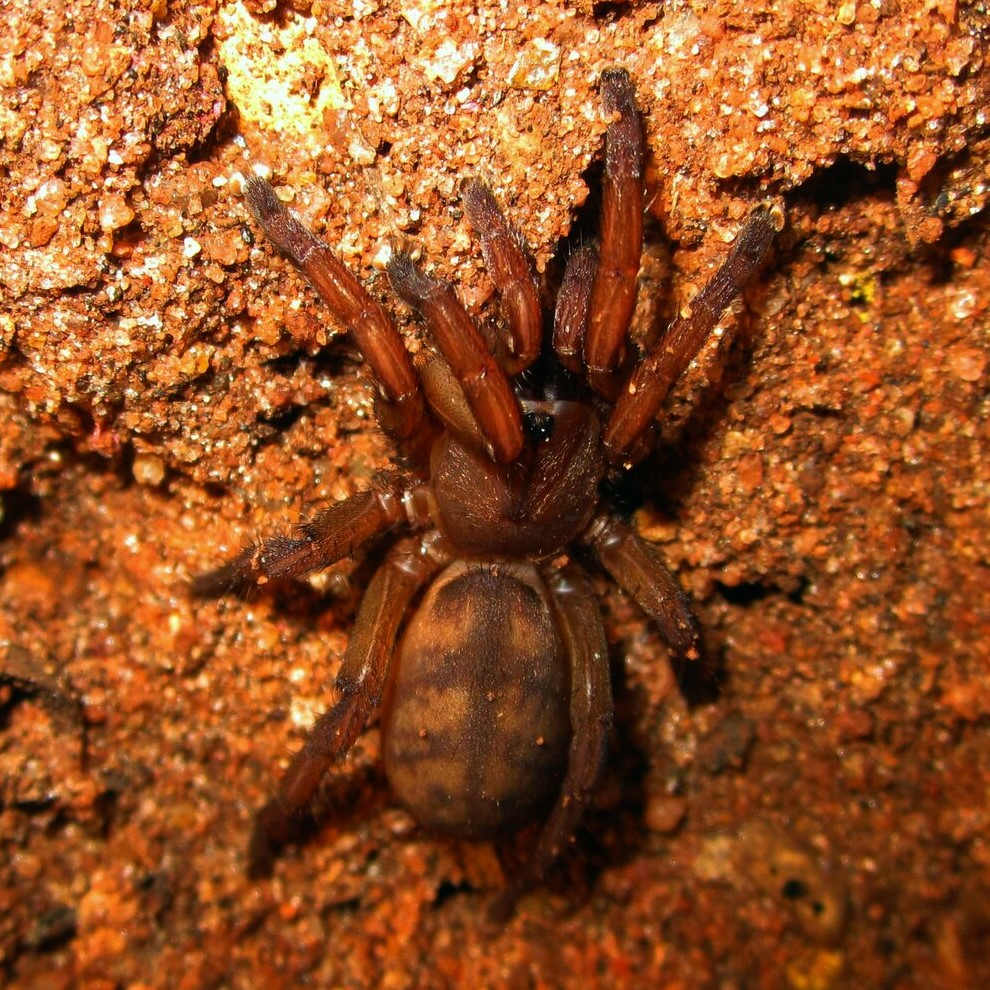
- Tigidia sp.

Scientific classification
- Kingdom: Animalia
- Phylum: Arthropoda
- Subphylum: Chelicerata
- Class: Arachnida
- Order: Araneae
- Infraorder: Mygalomorphae
- Family: Barychelidae
- Genus: Tigidia; Simon, 1892

Type species
- T. mauriciana Simon, 1892

Species
- 14, see text

Synonyms
- Acropholius Simon, 1902; Cestotrema Simon, 1902; Forsythula Pocock, 1903; Nossibea Strand, 1907; Tructicus Strand, 1907

= Tigidia =

Genus of spiders

Tigidia is a genus of brushed trapdoor spiders first erected by Eugène Simon in 1892.

== Species ==
As of October 2025, this genus includes fourteen species:

- Tigidia alluaudi (Simon, 1902) – Madagascar
- Tigidia bastardi (Simon, 1902) – Madagascar
- Tigidia dubia (Strand, 1907) – Madagascar
- Tigidia fasciata Mirza, 2023 – India
- Tigidia jalgaonensis Mirza, 2023 – India
- Tigidia konkanensis Mirza, Zende & Patil, 2016 – India
- Tigidia majori (Pocock, 1903) – Madagascar
- Tigidia mathiauxi (Simon, 1902) – Madagascar
- Tigidia mauriciana Simon, 1892 – Mauritius (type species)
- Tigidia nilgiriensis Sanap, Mirza & Siliwal, 2011 – India
- Tigidia rutilofronis Sanap, Mirza & Siliwal, 2011 – India
- Tigidia sahyadri Siliwal, Gupta & Raven, 2011 – India
- Tigidia tangerina Mirza, 2023 – India
- Tigidia typica (Strand, 1907) – Madagascar
