= Trittame =

Scientific classification
- Domain: Eukaryota
- Kingdom: Animalia
- Phylum: Arthropoda
- Subphylum: Chelicerata
- Class: Arachnida
- Order: Araneae
- Infraorder: Mygalomorphae
- Family: Barychelidae
- Genus: Trittame; L. Koch, 1874

Type species
- T. gracilis L. Koch, 1874

Species
- 12, see text

Genus of spiders

Trittame is a genus of brushed trapdoor spiders first described by German arachnologist Ludwig Carl Christian Koch in 1874. It is endemic to Australia.

== Species ==
As of April 2019 the genus contained twelve species, all from Queensland:

- Trittame augusteyni Raven, 1994
- Trittame bancrofti (Rainbow & Pulleine, 1918)
- Trittame berniesmythi Raven, 1994
- Trittame forsteri Raven, 1990
- Trittame gracilis L. Koch, 1874 (type)
- Trittame ingrami Raven, 1990
- Trittame kochi Raven, 1990
- Trittame loki Raven, 1990
- Trittame mccolli Raven, 1994
- Trittame rainbowi Raven, 1994
- Trittame stonieri Raven, 1994
- Trittame xerophila Raven, 1990
