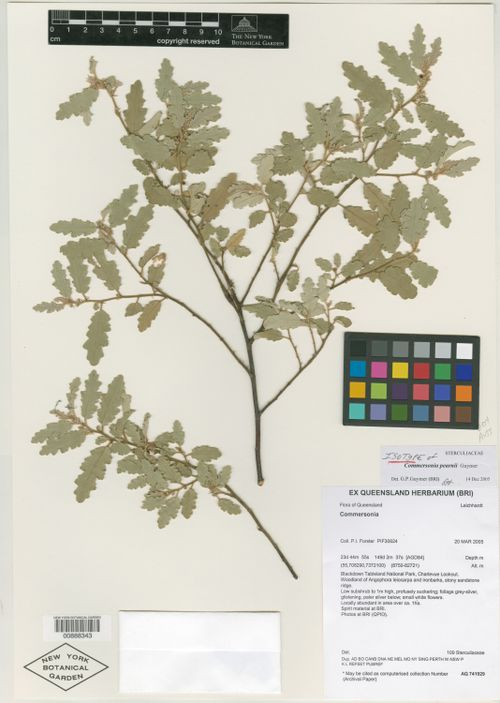
- Isotype in New York Botanical Garden

Conservation status
- Critically Endangered (NCA)

Scientific classification
- Kingdom: Plantae
- Clade: Embryophytes
- Clade: Tracheophytes
- Clade: Spermatophytes
- Clade: Angiosperms
- Clade: Eudicots
- Clade: Rosids
- Order: Malvales
- Family: Malvaceae
- Genus: Androcalva
- Species: A. pearnii

Binomial name
- Androcalva pearnii (Guymer) C.F.Wilkins & Whitlock

Synonyms
- Commersonia pearnii Guymer

= Androcalva pearnii =

Species of shrub

Androcalva pearnii is a species of flowering plant in the family Malvaceae and is endemic to the Blackdown Tableland National Park in eastern Queensland. It is shrub that forms suckers and has hairy new growth, wavy, oblong to elliptic leaves with rounded lobes on the edges, and groups of 3 to 8 white and cream-coloured to pale green flowers.

== Description ==
Androcalva pearnii is a suckering shrub that typically grows to 0.3–1 m (1 ft 0 in – 3 ft 3 in) high and wide, its new growth covered with fine, star-shaped hairs. The leaves are oblong to elliptic, 10–50 mm (0.39–1.97 in) long and 6–16 mm (0.24–0.63 in) wide on a petiole 3–10 mm (0.12–0.39 in) long with narrowly triangular stipules 1–6 mm (0.039–0.236 in) long at the base. The edges of the leaves are wavy with 5 to 7 pairs of rounded lobes 1–10 mm (0.039–0.394 in) long and both surfaces of the leaves are covered with velvety hairs. The flowers are arranged in groups of 3 to 8 on a peduncle 1 mm (0.039 in) long, each flower on a pedicel 0.5–0.8 mm (0.020–0.031 in) long, with bracts 1–5 mm (0.039–0.197 in) long at the base. The flowers are white and cream-coloured to pale green and 4–5 mm (0.16–0.20 in) in diameter with 5 petal-like sepals, the lobes 1.4–1.5 mm (0.055–0.059 in) long and wide. The petals are white, 1.3–1.5 mm (0.051–0.059 in) long, and there are 3 staminodes between each pair of stamens. Flowering occurs from September to December and in March.

== Taxonomy ==
This species was first formally described in 2005 by Gordon Guymer who gave it the name Commersonia pearnii in the journal Austrobaileya from specimens collected by Paul Irwin Forster near Charlevue Lookout in the Blackdown Tableland National Park in 2005. In 2011, Carolyn Wilkins and Barbara Whitlock transferred the species to Androcalva as A. pearnii in Australian Systematic Botany. The specific epithet (pearnii) honours Professor John Pearn.

== Distribution and habitat ==
Androcalva pearnii grows in open forest on the Blackdown Tableland in eastern Queensland.

== Conservation Status ==
Androcalva pearnii is listed as "critically endangered" under the Queensland Nature Conservation Act 1992. It is not currently listed under the Australian Government Environment Protection and Biodiversity Conservation Act 1999. The species has been nominated for assessment by the Threatened Species Scientific Committee. The assessment is expected to be completed by the end of October 2026 with the proposed listing of "critically endangered" under the Environment Protection and Biodiversity Conservation Act 1999.
