= Barychelus =

Scientific classification
- Kingdom: Animalia
- Phylum: Arthropoda
- Subphylum: Chelicerata
- Class: Arachnida
- Order: Araneae
- Infraorder: Mygalomorphae
- Family: Barychelidae
- Genus: Barychelus; Simon, 1889

Type species
- B. badius Simon, 1889

Genus of spiders

Barychelus is a genus of South Pacific brushed trapdoor spiders first described by Eugène Simon in 1889. As of April 2019 it contains only two species, both found on New Caledonia.

== Species ==
- Barychelus badius Simon, 1889 – New Caledonia
- Barychelus complexus Raven, 1994 – New Caledonia
