= Ammonius =

Ammonius is a masculine given name which may refer to:

- Ammonius Lithotomos (3rd century BC), Alexandrian Greek lithotomist
- Ammonius of Alexandria, ancient Olympic athlete who won the stadion race in the 131st Olympiad in 256 BCE
- Ammonius of Alexandria, ancient grammarian
- Ammonius of Athens (1st century AD), philosopher and teacher of Plutarch
- Ammonius Saccas (3rd century AD), Alexandrian Neoplatonist philosopher and teacher of Plotinus
- Ammonius of Alexandria (Christian philosopher) (3rd century AD), Christian writer confused with Ammonius Saccas
- Ammonius the Hermit, called Saint Amun, 4th century abbot and desert father
- Ammonius Grammaticus (fl. 389), Egyptian priest from Alexandria, supposed author of a grammatical treatise
- Ammonius Hermiae (5th century AD), Alexandrian philosopher
- Ammonius (Alexandrian monk) (c. 5th century AD)
