= Rainforests and vine thickets =

Major vegetation group in Australia

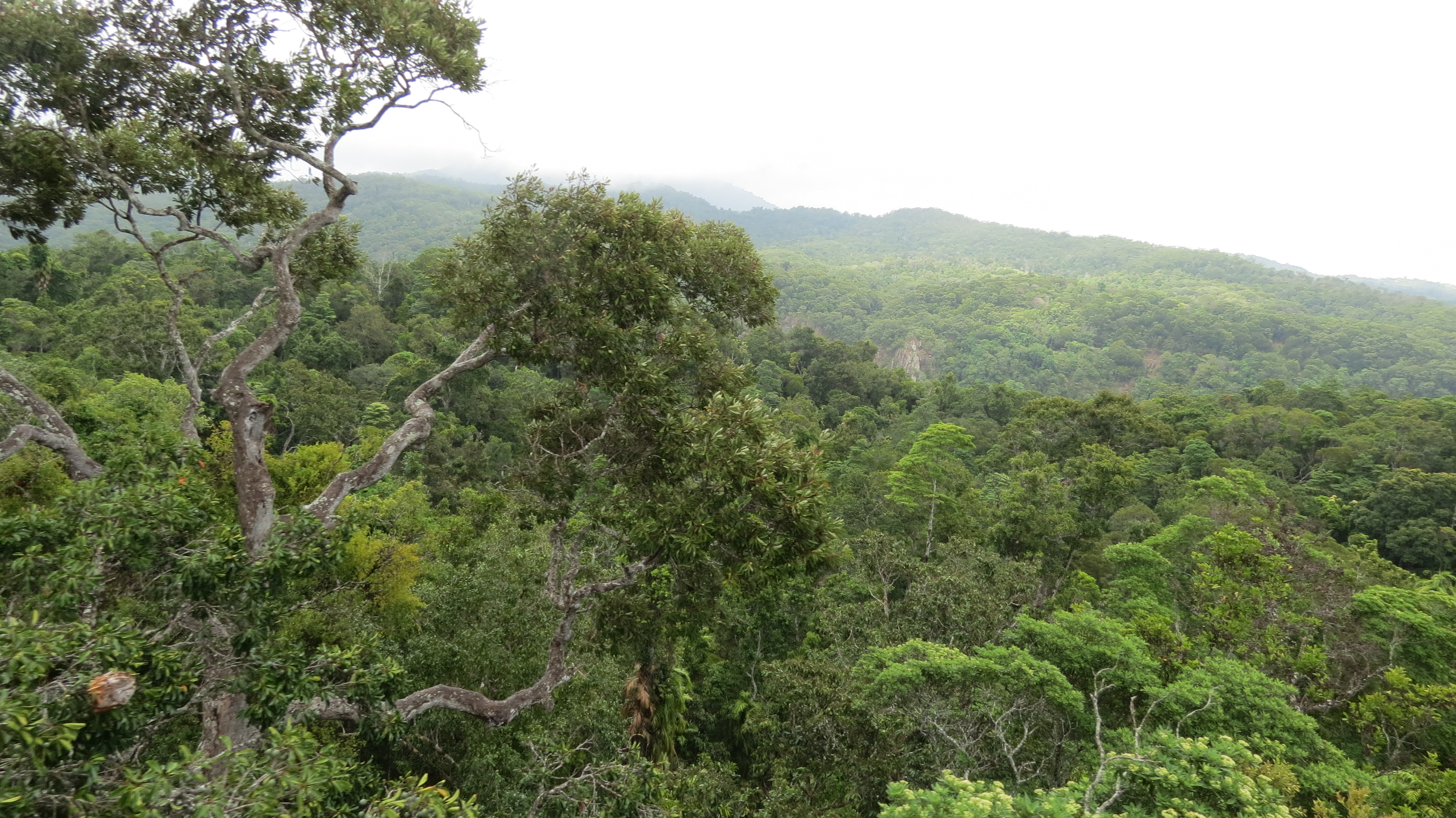
Daintree Rainforest

Rainforests and vine thickets are a major vegetation group in Australia. It consists of temperate to tropical rainforests, monsoon forests, and vine thickets. Rainforests and vine thickets are generally found in small pockets across the eastern and northern portions of the continent, including western Tasmania, eastern New South Wales, eastern Queensland, the northern portion of the Northern Territory, and the Kimberley Region of northeastern Western Australia.

Rainforests and vine thickets have a present extent of 36,469 km^{2}, of which 22,694 km^{2} is in protected areas.

Rainforests and vine thickets are present in 36 of Australia's bioregions. The largest extent of rainforest in Australia is in the Queensland tropical rain forests ecoregion (Wet Tropics bioregion). The estimated pre-1750 extent is 50,743 km^{2}. Prior to 1750, the largest area of rainforest and vine thicket was in the South Eastern Queensland bioregion, which is part of the Eastern Australian temperate forests ecoregion.

== Characteristics ==
Rainforests and vine thickets typically:

- are closed-canopy forests, generally with 70% or greater foliage cover.
- are characterised by trees with dense, horizontally or obliquely-held foliage in the upper layers.
- are described in terms of leaf size:
  - mesophyll – more than 12.5 cm long (45 – 100 cm^{2}), e.g. tropical rainforest
  - notophyll – 7.5 - 12.5 cm long (2 – 45 cm^{2}), e.g. warm temperate rainforest
  - microphyll – less than 7.5 cm long (2.5 – 20 cm^{2}), e.g. cloud forest.
- are high in plant-species diversity, which declines with increasing latitude and elevation.
- are ‘taxonomically-deep’ in biodiversity, with diverse representation of genera, families and orders.
- are home to plants that regenerate in low light conditions, typically in canopy gaps.
- have a species composition that varies between successional stages following different kinds of disturbance.
- are rarely fire-prone. Regular or intense wildfires can destroy the dense moisture-conserving forest cover, which many rainforest and vine thicket species depend on to regenerate and thrive. Where human activity and/or climatic change increase the frequency or intensity of fires, rainforests may be replaced with more fire-tolerant plant communities like sclerophyll forest or woodland.
- may have emergent eucalypts present within its margins or throughout, depending on disturbance history.
- vines, epiphytes and mosses are a conspicuous and important element of their structure in tropical and subtropical rainforests. In temperate rainforests epiphytes are less abundant and primarily cryptogams.

=== Characteristic flora ===
Non-sclerophyllous species dominate rainforests and vine thickets. Many of these species are representatives of the so-called ‘primitive’ flowering plant families such as Winteraceae, Eupomatiaceae, Monimiaceae, Lauraceae, and Cunoniaceae. Other typical plant families include Capparaceae, Celastraceae, Dilleniaceae, Ebenaceae, Euphorbiaceae, Meliaceae, Myrtaceae, Pittosporaceae, Rubiaceae, Rutaceae, Sapindaceae, Sterculiaceae, and Verbenaceae.

== Geography ==
- Rainforests and vine thickets cover a wide geographic range along the eastern fringe of the continent and across the north, and are absent from central and western Australia.
- They occur in cool temperate, warm temperate, subtropical, and tropical areas in Queensland, New South Wales, Victoria, Tasmania and as small patches in north coastal Northern Territory and the Kimberley region in Western Australia.
- Rainforests and vine thickets also grow on Australia's offshore islands, including Christmas Island, Lord Howe Island, and Norfolk Island.

== Environment ==
- Rain forests and vine thickets occur from sea level up to 1500 metres elevation, mostly within 100 km of the coast. Outliers of vine thicket extend further inland.
- They are mostly confined to wetter areas or climatic refuges in eastern and northern Australia receiving more than 1200 mm of rainfall annually, but vine scrub and dry rainforest may occur in small patches where average annual rainfall is as low as 600 – 900 mm.
- At the drier end of the rainfall range, rainforests and vine thickets are typically confined to topographically sheltered sites.
- Rainforests and vine thickets grow on a range of substrates, including volcanic to sedimentary substrates, alluvial plains, and coastal sand sheets, with moderate to high levels of soil nutrients. Soils can exert a strict control on location and structure within a climatic zone. The influence of soil substrates is muted at the extremes of the tropical-monsoonal dry type and the cool-temperate wet type.

== Rainforest communities ==
Major rainforest and vine thicket communities include cool temperate rainforest, tropical or sub-tropical rainforest, warm temperate rainforest, dry rainforest or vine thickets. They can be structured as closed forest (low, mid, and tall), closed fernland (low and mid), closed palmland (low and mid), closed vineland (low and mid), and closed shrubland (tall).

=== Tropical rainforest ===
Tropical rainforests are tropical evergreen mesophyll closed-canopy forests. Humid evergreen rainforest is mostly limited to northeastern Queensland. These forests are species-rich, with hundreds of tree species growing in Queensland's Wet Tropics, and no one species dominates the canopy. Characteristic genera include Ficus, Toona, Sloanea, Araucaria, Cryptocarya, Diospyros, Syzygium, Archontophoenix, Arthropteris, Linospadix, Calamus, Smilax, Cissus, Platycerium, Adiantum, Asplenium, and Dendrobium.

Australia's largest remaining tropical rainforest area is in the Wet Tropics bioregion of northern Queensland, covering more than 20,000 km^{2}. Tropical rainforests which have been extensively cleared include the Atherton Tableland and Eungella Plateau, and coastal Wet Tropics floodplains of Daintree, Barron, Johnstone, Tully–Murray, Herbert, Proserpine and Pioneer River, and tropical lowlands from Cairns to Cooktown.

=== Semi-deciduous monsoon forest ===
Monsoon forests grow in tropical areas of northern Australia with a pronounced dry season. They are typically semi-deciduous, with many canopy trees losing their leaves during the dry season, and becoming 'raingreen' during the rainy monsoon season. They tend to have a lower canopy than evergreen rain forests, and are rich in woody lianas and herbaceous epiphytes. Isolated patches of semi-deciduous monsoon forest occur across tropical northern Australia, including the Northern Territory's Top End and the Kimberley region of Western Australia. Habitats are diverse, including sandstone gorges and rock outcrops, lowland springs and stream margins, coastal beach ridges, and lateritic formations. Patches are from 10 to 100 km^{2} in size in the Arnhem Land tropical savanna ecoregion of the northern Top End, and generally smaller than 10 km^{2} across the Kimberley, Victoria Plains, and Carpentaria ecoregions further south. They are typically surrounded by flammable Eucalyptus/Corymbia open woodlands and savannas. The Kimberley region has over 1,500 patches of monsoon rainforest totaling 7,000 hectares. Patches average less than four hectares in area, with about 3% greater than 20 ha and the largest at 200 ha.

=== Littoral rainforest ===
Littoral rainforest is scattered along the coast in areas influenced by moist maritime winds, and include elements of tropical and subtropical or warm temperate rainforest. Typical littoral rainforest genera include Pisonia, Cupaniopsis, and Euroschinus.

Littoral rainforests and coastal vine thickets occur along the eastern coast of Australia from northern Queensland to eastern Victoria, in the Cape York Peninsula (from Princess Charlotte Bay southwards), Wet Tropics, Central Mackay Coast, South Eastern Queensland, NSW North Coast, Sydney Basin, and South East Corner bioregions.

=== Subtropical and warm temperate rainforest ===
Warm temperate and subtropical forests are scattered throughout the mid-latitudes. Typical plant genera include Ackama, Acmena, Blechnum, Ceratopetalum, Cissus, Doryphora, Endiandra, Lastreopsis, Marsdenia, Orites, and Quintinia. Subtropical rainforests have been extensively cleared for timber, dairying or agriculture. They include:

- the Big Scrub in northern New South Wales, reduced from an estimated 75,000 ha to just 300 ha by 1900
- the Illawarra rainforests
- hoop pine (Araucaria cunninghamii) scrubs of south-east Queensland.

The mountain frog (Philoria kundagungan) is a subtropical rainforest endemic which dwells in rainforest enclaves in south-east Queensland and north-eastern New South Wales.

=== Semi-deciduous vine thicket ===
Semi-deciduous vine thicket, also known as semi-evergreen vine thicket, communities occur in drier environments, like the Brigalow Belt on the western slopes of the Great Dividing Range in south-central Queensland and north-central New South Wales. Monsoonal vine thickets are found on the eastern coast in the transitional zone between the coast and semi-arid areas, and in the seasonal tropics of northern Australia. Vine thickets grow in dune swales in the Dampier Peninsula of Western Australia's Kimberley region, and are sustained by groundwater from the Broome aquifer and coastal fog during the dry season. Characteristic genera include Brachychiton, Cassine, Flindersia, Alectryon, Alphitonia, Aphanopetalum, Backhousia, Diospyros, Claoxylon, Clerodendrum, Mallotus, Wilkiea, Celastrus, Pyrrosia, and Pellaea. Extensive areas of vine thickets have been substantially cleared for agriculture and grazing, including the softwood scrubs in the Brigalow Belt.

=== Cool temperate rainforest ===
Cool temperate rainforests include both deciduous and evergreen forests, typically beech forests dominated by only one or two canopy species at high latitudes and elevations. The most extensive cool temperate rainforests are the Tasmanian temperate rainforests of western Tasmania, particularly in the north-west. Smaller areas are also found in favourable higher-elevation sites in eastern Victoria and a few small climatic refuges along the Great Dividing Range as far north as the McPherson Range of south-east Queensland. There are an estimated 545,000 ha in Tasmania, 3,000 ha in Victoria, and 15,000 ha in New South Wales.

Typical genera include Nothofagus, Eucryphia, Atherosperma, Athrotaxis, Dicksonia, and Tmesipteris. Predominant trees in Tasmania include myrtle beech (Nothofagus cunninghamii) and the Tasmanian endemic conifers Huon pine (Lagarostrobos franklinii), celery top pine (Phyllocladus aspleniifolius), and King Billy pine (Athrotaxis selaginoides). Sassafras (Atherosperma moschatum) and leatherwood (Eucryphia spp.) are common broadleaf canopy trees. Deciduous beech (Nothofagus gunnii) is common at high elevations. In eastern Victoria Atherosperma moschatum and black olive berry (Elaeocarpus holopetalus) are the dominant canopy trees.
