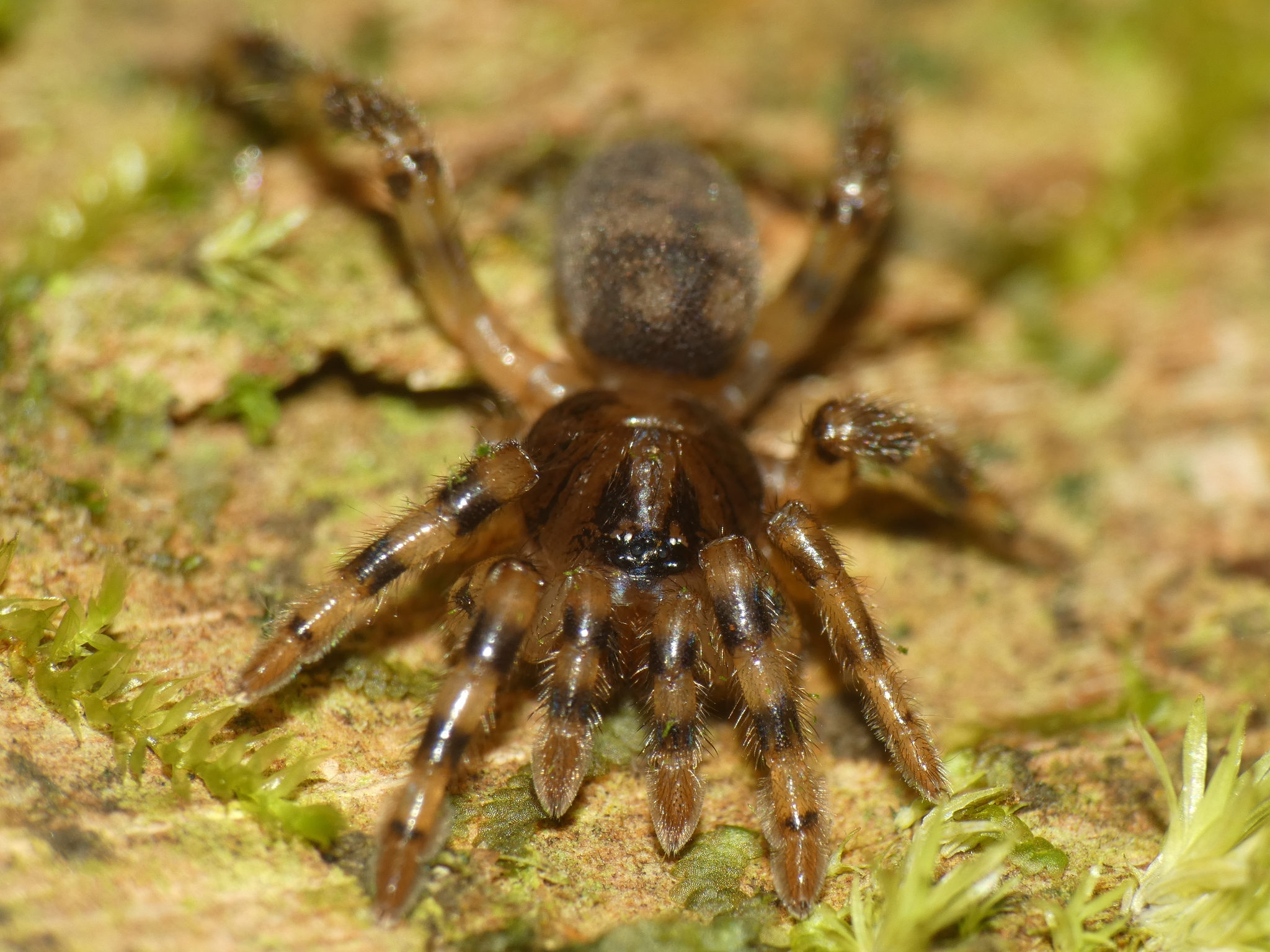
- Sason colemani from Australia
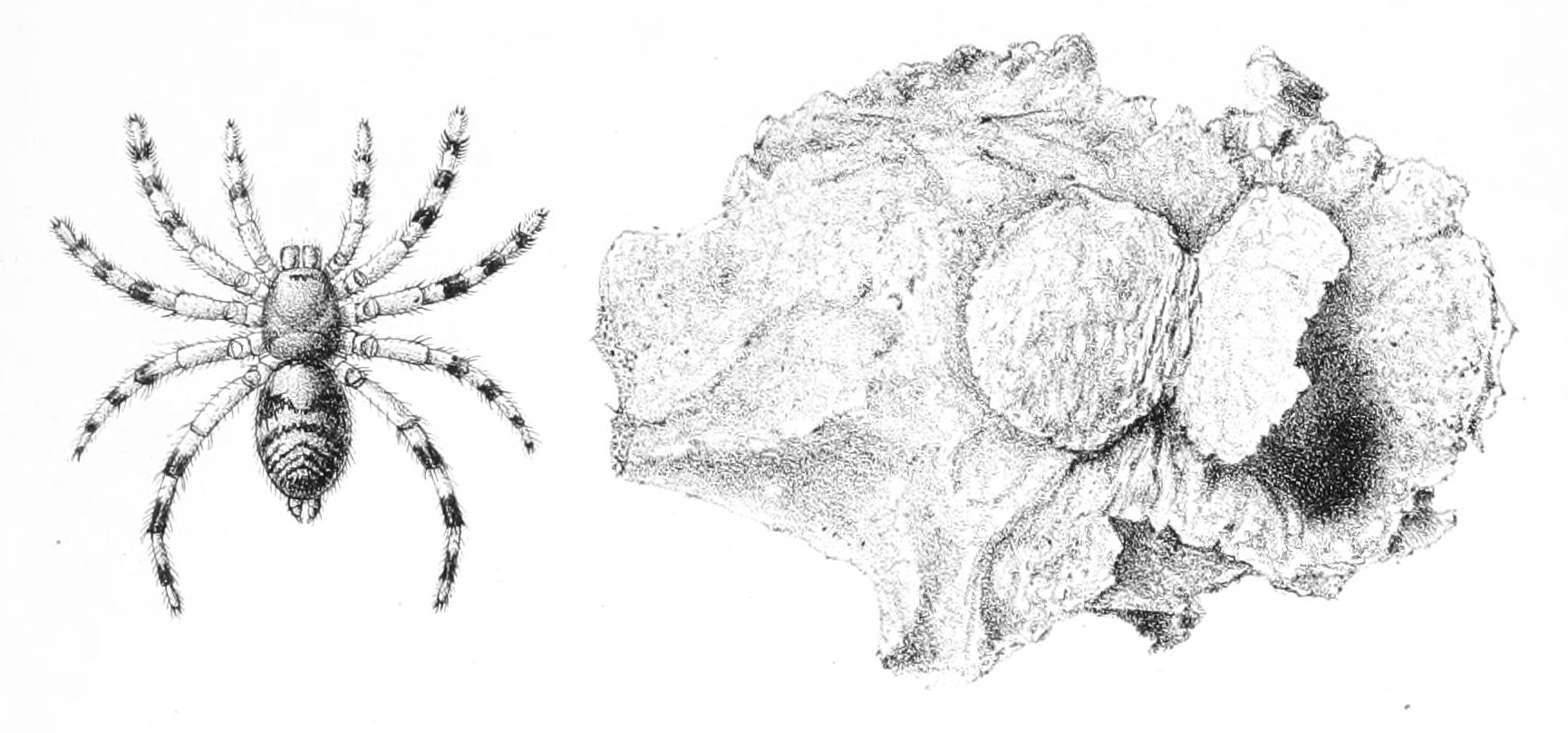
- Sason robustum with nest

Scientific classification
- Kingdom: Animalia
- Phylum: Arthropoda
- Subphylum: Chelicerata
- Class: Arachnida
- Order: Araneae
- Infraorder: Mygalomorphae
- Clade: Avicularioidea
- Family: Barychelidae; Simon, 1889

Diversity
- 39 genera, 294 species
- blue: reported countries (WSC) green: observation hotspots (iNaturalist)

= Barychelidae =

Brushed-footed trap-door spiders Temporal range: Neogene–present

Spider family

Barychelidae, also known as brushed trapdoor spiders, is a spider family with about 300 species in 39 genera.

== Behaviour ==
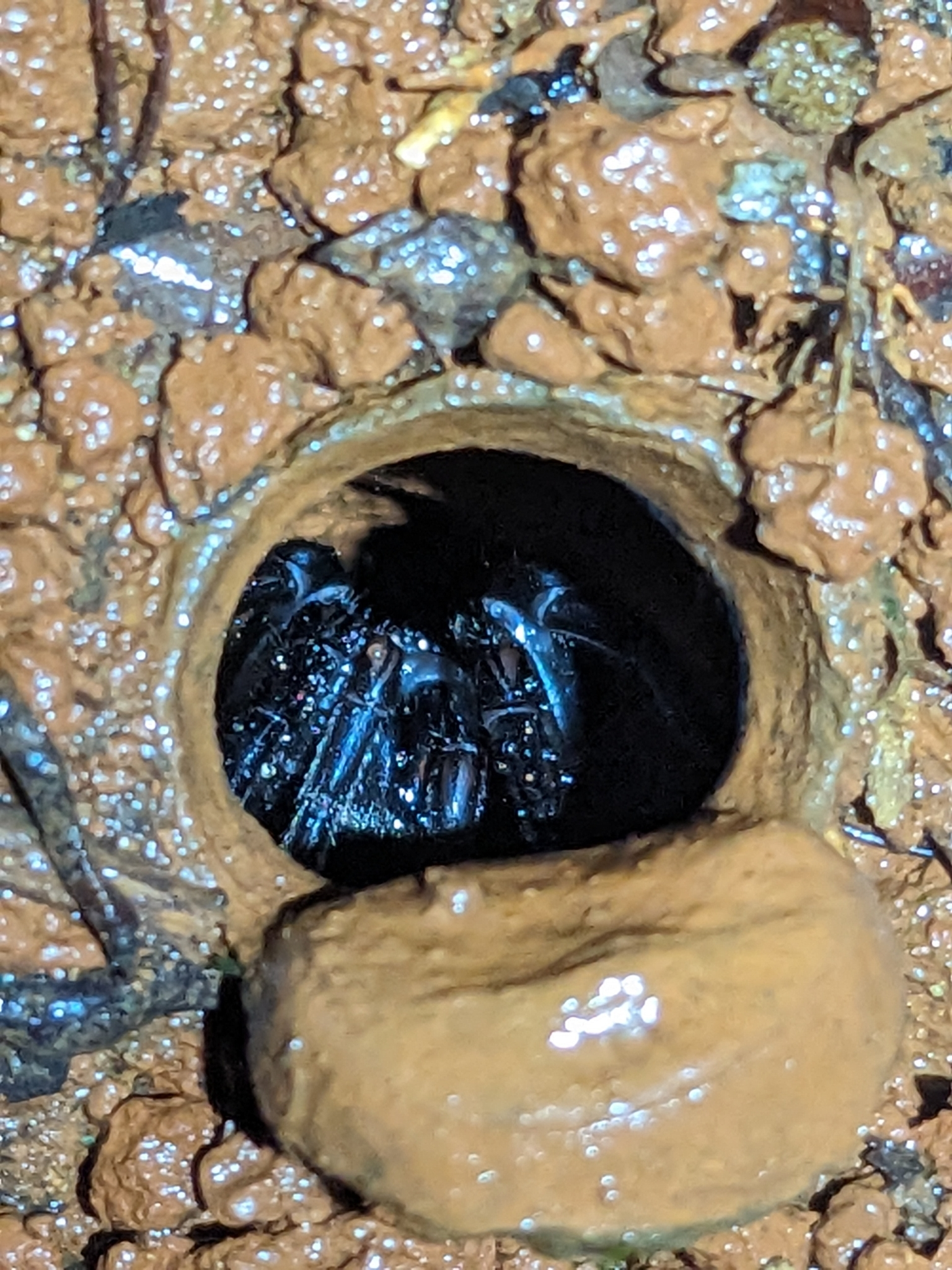
Trittame loki in burrow

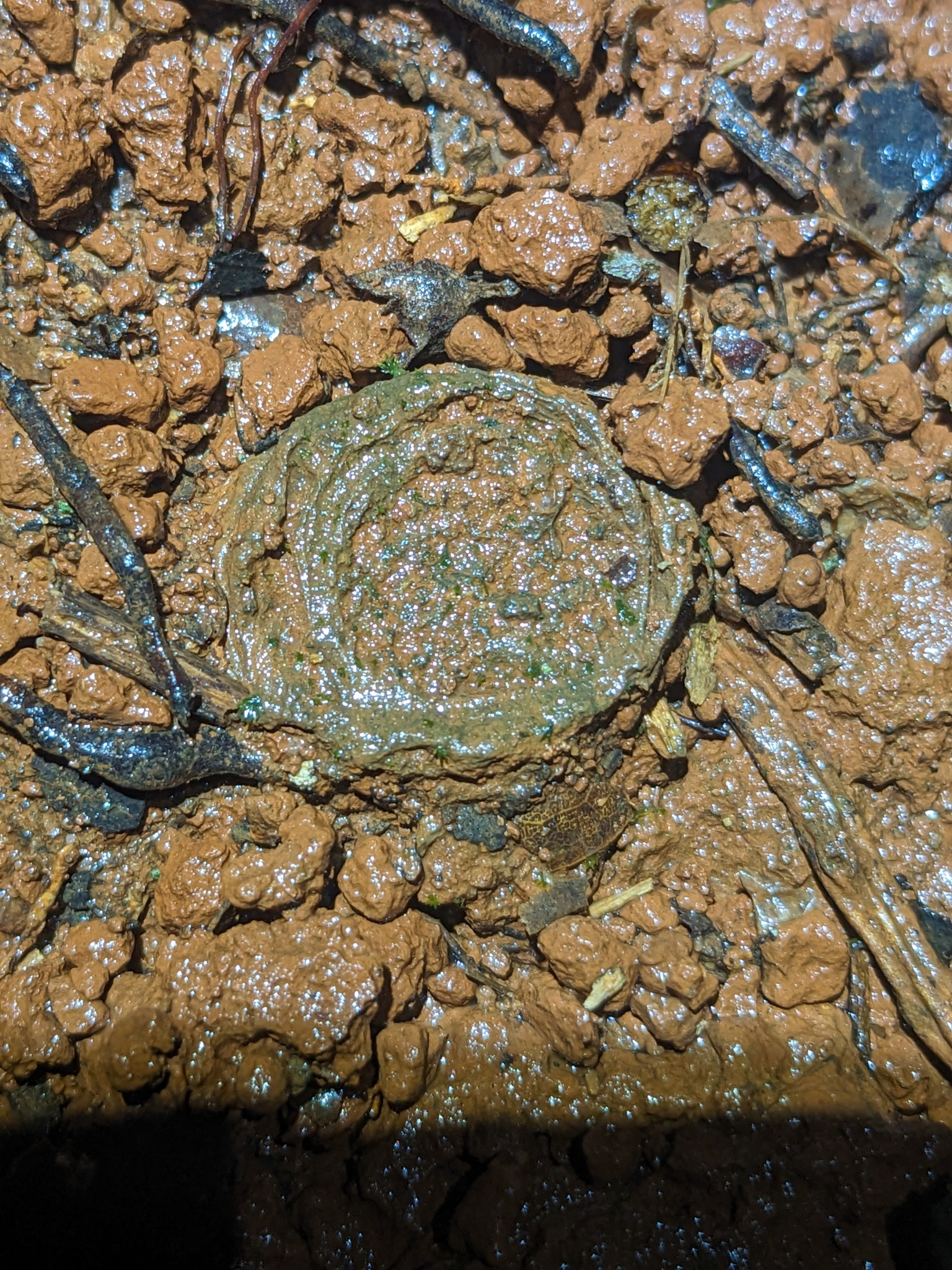
closed burrow

Most spiders in this family build trapdoor burrows. For example, the 20 millimetres (0.79 in) long Sipalolasma builds its burrow in rotted wood, with a hinged trapdoor at each end. The 10 millimetres (0.39 in) long Idioctis builds its burrow approximately 5 centimetres (2.0 in) deep, just below the high tide level, sealing the opening with a thin trapdoor.

Some species avoid flooding by plugging their burrows, while others can avoid drowning by trapping air bubbles within the hairs covering their bodies. Some members of this group have a rake on the front surface of their chelicerae used for compacting burrow walls. These spiders can run up glass like tarantulas, and some can stridulate, though it isn't audible to humans.

== Distribution ==
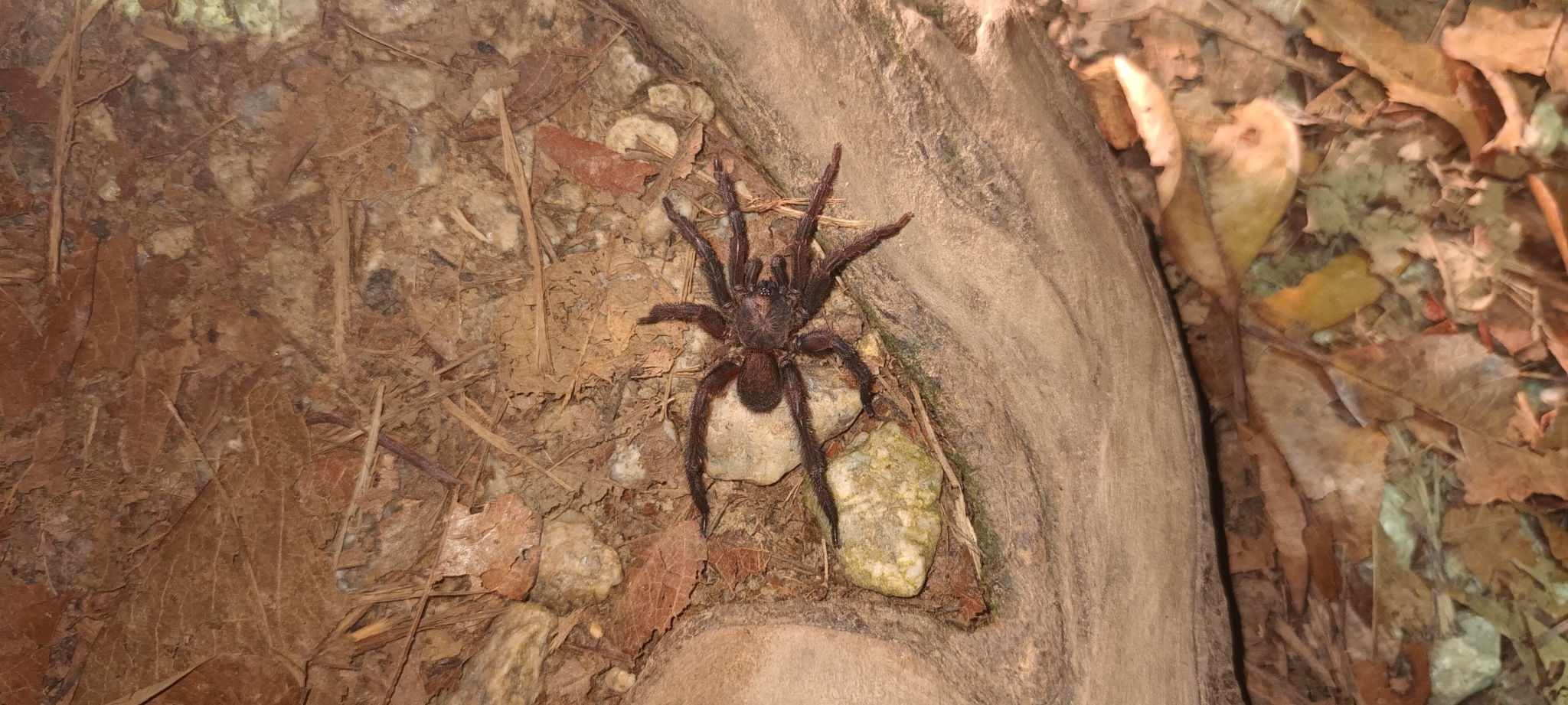
Rhianodes atratus

Barychelids are found in Australia, New Caledonia, South America, Africa, Madagascar, India, New Guinea, and Pacific islands.

== Genera ==
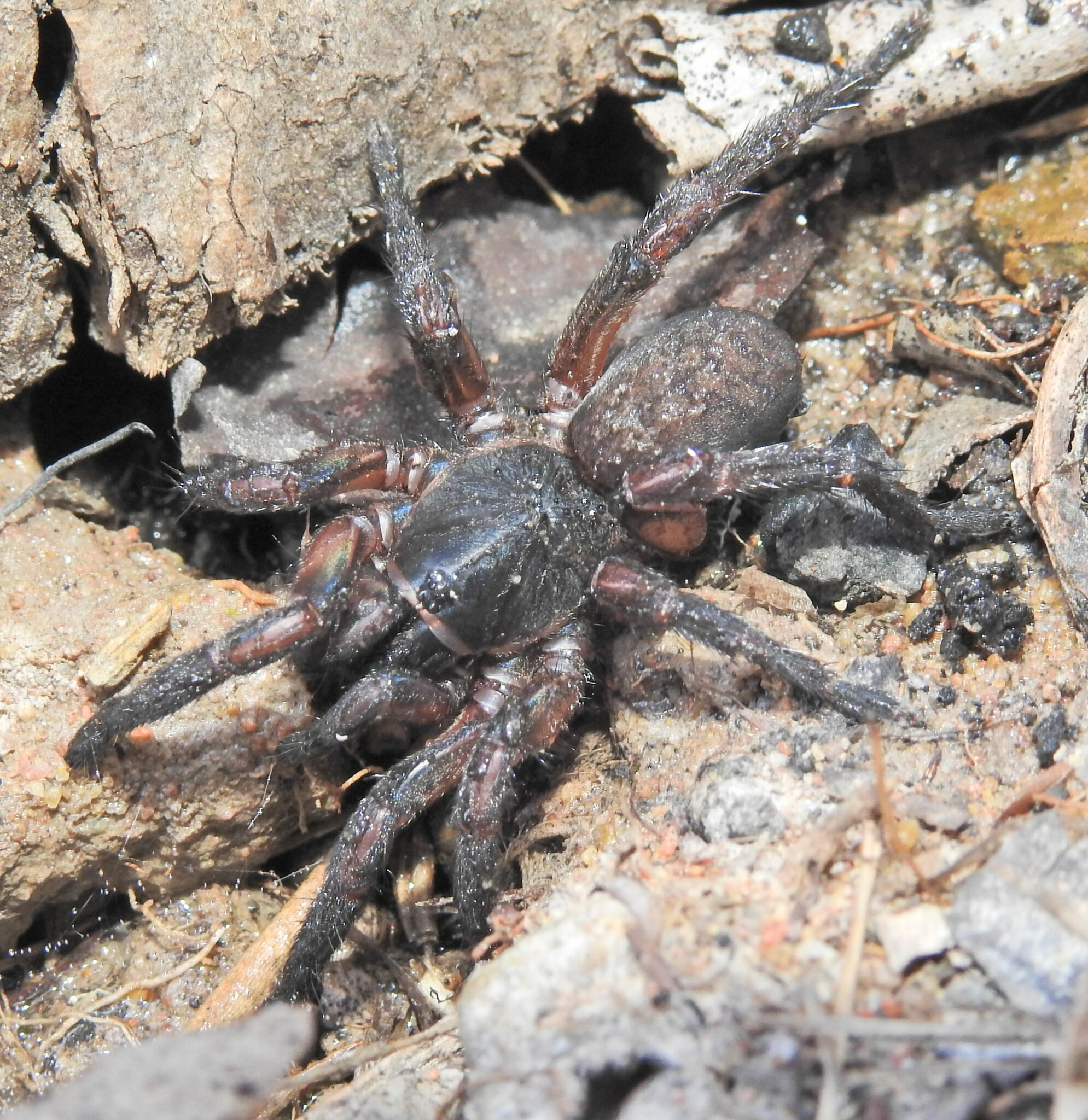
Ozicrypta cooloola

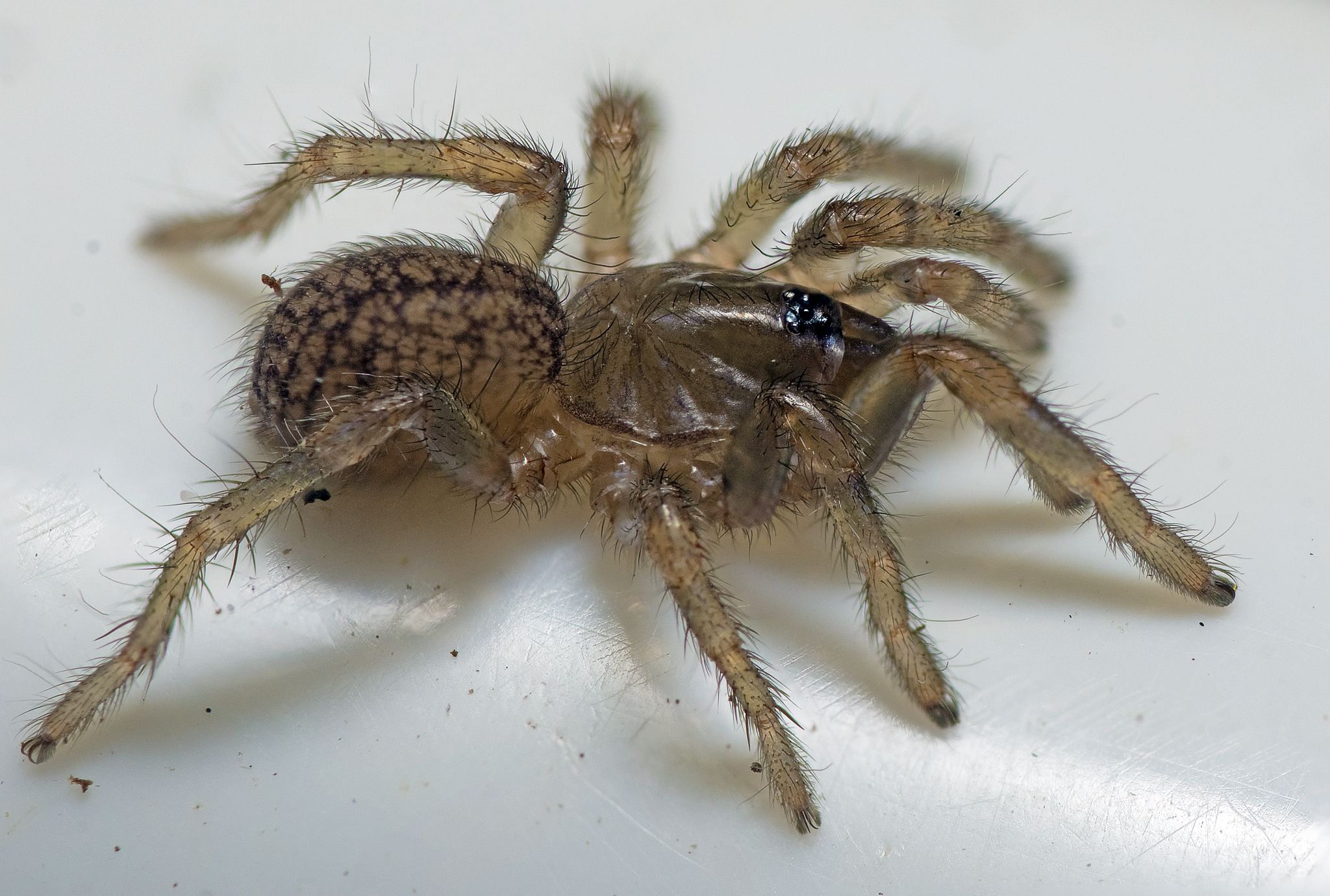
Seqocrypta jakara

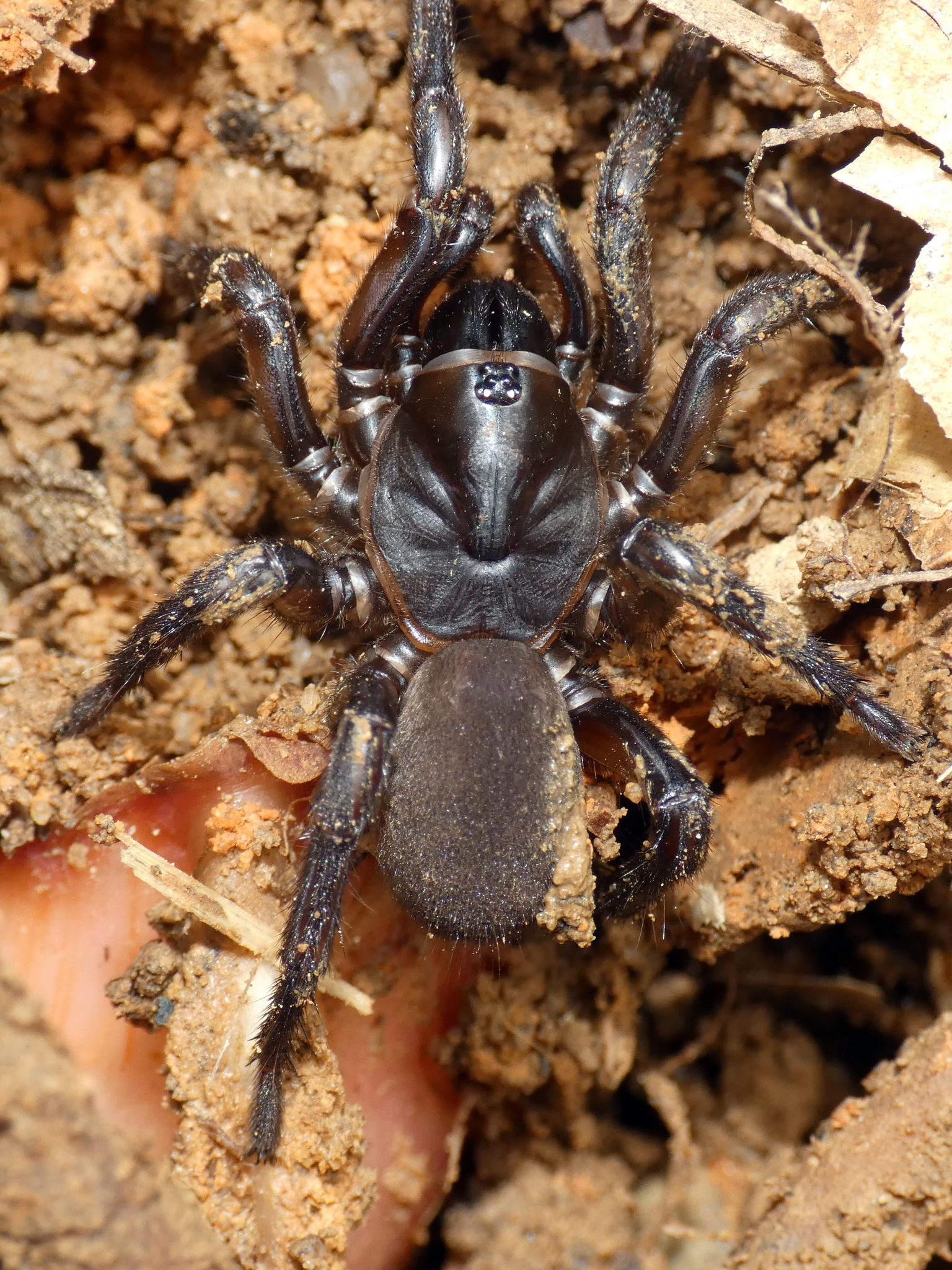
Trittame loki

As of January 2026, this family includes 39 genera and 294 species:

- Adelonychia Walsh, 1890 – India, Sri Lanka
- Ammonius Thorell, 1899 – Cameroon, Ivory Coast
- Atrophothele Pocock, 1903 – Yemen
- Aurecocrypta Raven, 1994 – Australia
- Barycheloides Raven, 1994 – New Caledonia
- Barychelus Simon, 1889 – New Caledonia
- Cosmopelma Simon, 1889 – Brazil
- Cyphonisia Simon, 1889 – Africa
- Encyocrypta Simon, 1889 – New Caledonia
- Eubrachycercus Pocock, 1897 – Somalia
- Fijocrypta Raven, 1994 – Fiji
- Idioctis L. Koch, 1874 – Madagascar, Mayotte, Seychelles, Taiwan, Singapore, Australia, Fiji, New Caledonia, Solomon Islands, Marshall Islands, Samoa, Caroline Islands
- Idiommata Ausserer, 1871 – Australia
- Idiophthalma O. Pickard-Cambridge, 1877 – South America
- Mandjelia Raven, 1994 – Australia, New Caledonia
- Monodontium Kulczyński, 1908 – Indonesia, Malaysia, Singapore, New Guinea, Papua New Guinea
- Moruga Raven, 1994 – Australia
- Natgeogia Raven, 1994 – New Caledonia
- Neodiplothele Mello-Leitão, 1917 – Brazil
- Nihoa Raven & Churchill, 1992 – Hawaii, Melanesia, Palau Islands
- Orstom Raven, 1994 – New Caledonia
- Ozicrypta Raven, 1994 – Australia
- Paracenobiopelma Feio, 1952 – Brazil, Ecuador
- Pisenor Simon, 1889 – Africa
- Plagiobothrus Karsch, 1892 – Sri Lanka
- Questocrypta Raven, 1994 – New Caledonia
- Rhianodes Raven, 1985 – Malaysia, Philippines, Singapore
- Sason Simon, 1887 – Seychelles, Indonesia, Malaysia, Thailand, India, Sri Lanka, Australia, Caroline Islands, Mariana Islands
- Sasonichus Pocock, 1900 – India
- Seqocrypta Raven, 1994 – Australia
- Sipalolasma Simon, 1892 – Democratic Republic of the Congo, Ethiopia, Mozambique, South Africa, Zimbabwe, Malaysia, Singapore, India, Sri Lanka
- Strophaeus Ausserer, 1875 – Panama, South America
- Synothele Simon, 1908 – Australia
- Tigidia Simon, 1892 – Madagascar, Mauritius, India
- Trittame L. Koch, 1874 – Australia
- Troglothele Fage, 1929 – Cuba
- Tungari Raven, 1994 – Australia
- Zophorame Raven, 1990 – Australia
- Zophoryctes Simon, 1902 – Madagascar
