= 2020 Queen's Birthday Honours (Australia) =

Annual honours in Australia

The 2020 Queen's Birthday Honours for Australia were announced on 8 June 2020 by the Governor-General, David Hurley.

The Birthday Honours are appointments by some of the 16 Commonwealth realms of Queen Elizabeth II to various orders and honours to reward and highlight good works by citizens of those countries. The Birthday Honours will be awarded as part of the Queen's Official Birthday celebrations during the month of June.

== Order of Australia ==
General division ribbon

Military division ribbon

=== Companion of the Order of Australia (AC) ===
==== General Division ====
- The Honourable Tony Abbott – For eminent service to the people and Parliament of Australia, particularly as Prime Minister, and through significant contributions to trade, border control, and to the Indigenous community.
- Belinda Jane Hutchinson AM – For eminent service to business, to tertiary education and scientific research, and through philanthropic endeavours to address social disadvantage.
- Naomi Gay Milgrom AO – For eminent service to the community through philanthropic leadership and support for the promotion of the arts, architecture, design excellence and cultural exchange, and to business.

=== Officer of the Order of Australia (AO) ===
==== General Division ====
- Alexander William Auldist – For distinguished service to paediatric medicine as a surgeon, educator and mentor of young physicians, and to professional organisations.
- The Honourable Michael Bruce Baird – For distinguished service to the people and Parliament of New South Wales, particularly as Premier, and to the community.
- Professor Graeme Laurence Barnes – For distinguished service to medicine, particularly to child gastrointestinal health, and to medical research.
- Emeritus Professor Perry Francis Bartlett – For distinguished service to neuroscience research, and to people living with dementia, motor neurone disease, and spinal cord injury.
- Colin David Beckett – For distinguished service to business in the energy, gas and oil production and infrastructure sectors, and to tertiary education.
- The Honourable Bronwyn Kathleen Bishop – For distinguished service to the Parliament of Australia, to the people of New South Wales, and to women in politics.
- The Honourable Ronald Leslie Boswell – For distinguished service to the Parliament of Australia, to the people of Queensland, and to fisheries research and development.
- Emeritus Professor Garry Leslie Brown – For distinguished service to aerospace and mechanical engineering, to education and research, and as a mentor of young scientists.
- Andrew James Burnes – For distinguished service to business, particularly through a range of travel industries, to professional tourism organisations, and to the community.
- William McFadyen Campbell PSM, QC – For distinguished service to public administration, and to international legal practice, through senior counsel and advisory roles.
- Professor Bruce James Chapman AM – For distinguished service to higher education, particularly in the field of economics and public policy, and to professional societies.
- Christine Christian – For distinguished service to the financial and investment sectors, to women in business, and through support for emerging entrepreneurs.
- Michael John Clarke – For distinguished service to cricket as a player at the national and international level, through leadership roles, and to the community.
- Professor Marcello Costa – For distinguished service to higher education, and to medical research, in the field of neurophysiology, and to professional scientific bodies.
- Emeritus Professor Suzanne Mary Crowe AM – For distinguished service to health and aged care administration, to clinical governance, biomedical research, and to education.
- Sean Christopher Dorney AM – For distinguished service to Australia-Papua New Guinea relations, to the broadcast media as a journalist, and as an author.
- Ralph John Lancaster Evans – For distinguished service to international trade and investment, to business and venture capital endeavours, and to the community.
- Professor Simon Robert Finfer – For distinguished service to intensive care medicine, to medical research and education, and to global health institutes.
- Dr Catherine Patricia Foley PSM – For distinguished service to research science, to the advancement of women in physics, and to professional scientific organisations.
- Denise Carol Goldsworthy – For distinguished service to business, particularly to technological innovation and research in the mining and manufacturing sectors.
- Diane Jennifer Grady AM – For distinguished service to the community through business and advisory roles, to the advancement of women and girls, and to charitable initiatives.
- Lucy Mary Guerin – For distinguished service to contemporary dance as a choreographer, and as a mentor and advocate for emerging artists and new works.
- Professor Ian Ross Harper – For distinguished service to education in the field of economics, and to public and monetary policy development and reform.
- Professor Gregory James Elliott Hill – For distinguished service to education, particularly the development of tertiary facilities in regional areas, and to the community.
- David Watherston Hills – For distinguished service to community health for people in rural and remote areas through aeromedical care organisations, and to business.
- Patrick Terence Jackman AM – For distinguished service to the community through support for educational and medical research organisations, and to tourism and business.
- Professor Marcia Lynne Langton AM – For distinguished service to tertiary education, and as an advocate for Aboriginal and Torres Strait Islander people.
- Dr Colin James Limpus, PSM – For distinguished service to environmental science, particularly to the conservation of sea turtles, and as a mentor of young scientists.
- Professor Georgina Venetia Long – For distinguished service to medicine, particularly to melanoma clinical and translational research, and to professional medical societies.
- Ronald Brown Manners – For distinguished service to the minerals and mining sectors, and to youth through philanthropic support for educational initiatives.
- Allan Donald McCallum – For distinguished service to primary industry, particularly to grain, seafood and medicinal plant production, and to professional organisations.
- Professor Isabella Caroline McMillen – For distinguished service to medical science, and to tertiary education, to the community of South Australia, and to social equity.
- Robert Lewis Milne – For distinguished service to community health through contributions to, and support for, medical research, and to the construction industry.
- Greta Richmond Moran – For distinguished service to the visual arts through philanthropic initiatives, as an advocate for Australian art and artists, and to the aged care sector.
- Simon David Mordant AM – For distinguished service to the visual arts at the national and international level, to emerging artists, and to philanthropy.
- Professor Graham Lorimer Moseley – For distinguished service to medical research and science communication, to education, to the study of pain and its management, and to physiotherapy.
- The Honourable Dr Denis Vincent Napthine – For distinguished service to the people and Parliament of Victoria, particularly as Premier, to veterinary science, and to the community.
- Robyn Anne Nevin AM – For distinguished service to the performing arts as an acclaimed actor and artistic director, and as a mentor and role model.
- Julien William O'Connell AM – For distinguished service to community health in the aged care sector through executive roles, and to higher education.
- Emeritus Professor Ronald Kim Oates AM – For distinguished service to paediatric medicine, as an advocate for child health and welfare, to medical education, and to professional societies.
- Michael Pezzullo – For distinguished service to public administration through leadership roles in the areas of national security, border control and immigration.
- The Honourable Justice Derek Michael Price AM – For distinguished service to the law, and to the judiciary, in New South Wales, and through contributions to professional legal organisations.
- The Honourable Graham Frederick Richardson – For distinguished service to the people and Parliament of Australia, to the media as a political commentator, and through philanthropic support for a range of community organisations.
- The Honourable Philip Maxwell Ruddock – For distinguished service to the people and Parliament of Australia, and to local government.
- Jan Vittorio Sardi – For distinguished service to the film and television industries as a screenwriter and director, and to professional guilds.
- Professor Bryant Allan Stokes AM, RFD – For distinguished service to public health care governance and standards in Western Australia through leadership and advisory roles.
- Ryan Kerry Stokes – For distinguished service to business, particularly in the media, mining and construction sectors, to cultural institutions, and to mental health and sporting groups.
- Francis John Sullivan – For distinguished service to the community, particularly through social justice and legislative reform initiatives, and to health and aged care.
- Dr George Arthur Werther – For distinguished service to medicine, to paediatric endocrinology and research, and to professional medical organisations.
- Professor Ingrid Margaret Winship – For distinguished service to medicine, particularly to clinical genetics and research, to cancer prevention, and as a role model and mentor.

==== Military Division ====
Navy

- Rear Admiral Jonathan Dallas Mead AM, RAN – For distinguished service to the Royal Australian Navy in senior management and command roles.

Army

- Major General Simon Andrew Stuart DSC, AM – For distinguished service and exceptional leadership as Force Commander, Multinational Force and Observers, Operation MAZURKA.

Air Force

- Air Marshal Warren George McDonald AM, CSC – For distinguished service in responsible positions as Deputy Chief of Air Force and Chief of Joint Capabilities.

=== Member of the Order of Australia (AM) ===
==== General Division ====
- The Honourable Jane Lesley Aagaard – For significant service to the Legislative Assembly of the Northern Territory, and to the community.
- Dr Jennifer Anne Abbey – For significant service to the health of aged persons, particularly to pain care management.
- Stefan Ackerie – For significant service to business, and through support for charitable organisations.
- David Charles Airey – For significant service to the real estate industry, and to professional institutes.
- Ian Bell Allen OAM – For significant service to the community through support for a range of organisations, and to cancer survivorship programs.
- Gregory Arthur Allum OAM – For significant service to surf lifesaving, to international federations, and to the community.
- Jeanette Miller Anictomatis – For significant service to the people of the Northern Territory through representational roles, and to youth through Guides.
- The Honourable Justice Peter David Applegarth – For significant service to the law, and to the judiciary, and to social justice.
- Penelope Jane Armytage – For significant service to public administration in Victoria, and to the community.
- Dr Arumugam Alagappa Arumugam – For significant service to medicine, to psychiatric health care, and to professional groups.
- Yvonne Audette – For significant service to the visual arts as an abstract painter.
- Charles Morland Bailes – For significant service to the law, to professional legal societies, and to the community.
- Professor Barbara Jane Bain – For significant service to medicine, and to medical education, particularly to haematology.
- Dr Christopher Stuart Baker – For significant service to medicine, to dermatology, and to professional medical colleges.
- Gary Eric Baldwin – For significant service to oenology as a wine maker, consultant and judge, and to professional associations.
- Martin Bartfeld – For significant service to the law, to legal education and reform, and as a mentor.
- Dr Robert John Bartlett – For significant service to orthopaedic medicine, and to national and international medical associations.
- Professor Kaye Enid Basford – For significant service to tertiary education, to the biomedical sciences, and to scientific academies.
- Jennifer Jane Batrouney QC – For significant service to the law, to the legal profession, and to women lawyers.
- Emeritus Professor Robert Charles Baxter – For significant service to medical research, to endocrinology, and to tertiary education.
- Dr Denver Edward Beanland – For significant service to the people and Parliament of Queensland, and to archival and historical organisations.
- Margie Beck – For significant service to Australia-Timor Leste relations through teacher education roles.
- Jay Annette Bonnington – For significant service to the community through support for charitable organisations, and to business.
- Glenn Bourke – For significant service to sailing at the elite level as a competitor, coach and administrator.
- Malcolm Stuart Boyd – For significant service to civil engineering, to tertiary education, and as a role model.
- John Richard Brew RFD – For significant service to the rail transport and logistics industry, and to education.
- Sarah Louise Brown – For significant service to community health, to remote area nursing, and to the Indigenous community.
- Dr Neil Lyall Bryans – For significant service to science and defence capability technology through radar and telecommunications research.
- Michael John Burge OAM – For significant service to community mental health, to advocacy, and to education.
- Bede Michael Burke – For significant service to the egg production industry, and to the community of Tamworth.
- Dr John Craig Byrne – For significant service to people who are deaf or hard of hearing, and to social justice.
- Ainslie June Cahill – For significant service to people living with arthritis, and to community health groups.
- Dr Rosemary Anne Callingham – For significant service to mathematics education, to teacher development, and to the community.
- Emeritus Professor Michael Francis Capra – For significant service to tertiary education, particularly to workplace health and safety science.
- Michael James Carlton – For significant service to the print and broadcast media, and to naval history.
- Michel-Henri Ernest Carriol – For significant service to Australia-France relations, to business, and to the community.
- Frances M. Cassidy – For significant service to Australia-United States of America cultural and business relations.
- Dr Gabrielle Afifee Cehic – For significant service to medicine, to nuclear oncology, and to professional medical groups.
- Eric James Chalmers – For significant service to the community through child accident prevention and road safety organisations.
- Professor Esther Ruth Charlesworth – For significant service to architecture, to education, and to the community of the Asia-Pacific region.
- Elizabeth (Libby) Patricia Christie – For significant service to performing arts administration, and to women in business.
- Judith Ann Clarkson – For significant service to business through child and aged care projects, and to the community.
- Dr Russell John Corlett – For significant service to plastic and reconstructive medicine, and to the community of the Asia-Pacific region.
- The late Dr Michele Cotton – For significant service to veterinary science, to education, and to professional organisations.
- Dr Jackie Craig – For significant service to science and technology research in the defence capability field.
- Brigadier Alison Margaret Creagh CSC – For significant service to veterans and their families, and to rowing.
- Perry Cross – For significant service to people living with a spinal cord injury, and as a role model.
- Brian (Bruno) Cullen – For significant service to the banking and credit union sector, to rugby league, and to the community.
- Dr John Henry Curotta – For significant service to medicine as an ear, nose and throat surgeon, and to Indigenous health.
- Dr Austin Mark Curtin – For significant service to medicine, and to health outcomes in regional communities.
- Professor Tamara Maree Davis – For significant service to astrophysical science, to education, and to young astronomers.
- Andrew Robert De Fégely – For significant service to the forestry industry through business and advisory roles.
- Margot Alison De Groot – For significant service to the law, to professional legal bodies, and to women in business.
- The Honourable John Joseph Della Bosca – For significant service to public health, particularly in the disability and drug support sectors, and to the Parliament of New South Wales.
- Michael Anthony Dillon – For significant service to the pharmacy profession, and to the community.
- Professor Neil Murray Drew – For significant service to tertiary education, to behavioural science, and to Indigenous health.
- Dr Katarzyna Magdalena Dziegielewska – For significant service to tertiary education, to anatomy and neurobiology, and as a mentor.
- Kevin John Edwards – For significant service to the legal profession, and to aged care and sporting organisations.
- Peter James Eveille – For significant service to the care and welfare of veterans and their families.
- Associate Professor Seamus Joseph Fagan – For significant service to tertiary education, particularly to English language teaching.
- Dr David Geoffrey Fahey – For significant service to emergency response organisations, and to medicine in the field of anaesthesia.
- Norman Harold Farmer ESM – For significant service to life saving at the national and international level, and to water safety initiatives.
- The Honourable Alan Baird Ferguson – For significant service to the Parliament of Australia, and to the community of South Australia.
- Professor Nicholas Maxwell Fisk – For significant service to tertiary education, and to maternal-fetal medicine.
- Julie Fitzgerald – For significant service to netball as a coach, and as a mentor of sportswomen.
- Atticus Richard Fleming – For significant service to the conservation of endangered wildlife and habitats.
- Philippa Anne Forrester – For significant service to the tourism and hospitality sectors, and to the community.
- Professor Susan (Lesley) Forster – For significant service to tertiary education, to rural public health, and to medical administration.
- Renita Maree Garard OAM – For significant service to hockey at the elite level, and to the community of Townsville.
- Professor Stephen Robert Garton – For significant service to tertiary education administration, and to history.
- Dr Karen Rae George – For significant service to history preservation and research, and to professional associations.
- Ian Andrew Gillespie – For significant service to motoring associations, to the cooperatives and mutual sector, and to motor sport.
- Professor Matthew Todd Gillespie – For significant service to tertiary education administration, and to medical research.
- Dr Jennifer (Jill) Gordon – For significant service to psychological medicine, and to professional medical bodies.
- Barbara Jean Green – For significant service to tertiary education, particularly to university colleges.
- Debbie Grove – For significant service to softball through umpiring development roles at the elite level.
- John Alan Hall – For significant service to community mental health, and to business.
- Margaret Halsmith – For significant service to the law, and to dispute resolution organisations.
- Emeritus Professor John Mackenzie Ham – For significant service to medical education, and to professional organisations.
- Dr Bruce Fairgray Harris – For significant service to higher education, to veterans, and to the community.
- Susan Ida Harris – For significant service to the community through philanthropic endeavours.
- Marilyn Frances Havini – For significant service to the international communities of Papua New Guinea and Bougainville.
- Margaret Lynne Hinton – For significant service to education, to philosophy, and to professional associations.
- Hugh James Hiscutt – For significant service to the people and Parliament of Tasmania, and to the community of West Devon.
- Dr Phoebe Joy Ho – For significant service to medical research, to haematology, and to professional bodies.
- Kathryn Terese House – For significant service to the community through charitable initiatives.
- Frank Richard Howarth PSM – For significant service to the visual arts through the museums and galleries sector.
- James Anthony Hutchison – For significant service to amateur radio, particularly to satellite and space communication.
- Elizabeth Marie Jameson – For significant service to business, and to the community.
- Andrew Jaspan – For significant service to the print and digital media, and to tertiary education.
- Dr Rebecca Nicole Johnson – For significant service to wildlife forensic science, and to young women scientists.
- Emeritus Professor Rhondda Elizabeth Jones – For significant service to tertiary education administration, to science, and to tropical health.
- Dr Sara Louise Jones – For significant service to medical education, to podiatry, and to professional groups.
- Dr Anthony Phillip Joseph – For significant service to emergency medicine, to medical colleges, and to education.
- Ian Lindsay Kaye-Eddie ASM – For significant service to medical administration, and to community health.
- David St Leger Kelly – For significant service to the law, to legal reform, and to tertiary education.
- Vincent Anthony (Tony) Kelly – For significant service to business, particularly to the natural resource supply industry.
- The late Glenys Kendrea Kendall – For significant service to lacrosse through administrative roles, and as a player.
- The Honourable Justice Susan Coralie Kenny – For significant service to the law, and to the judiciary, particularly to the Federal Court of Australia.
- Professor Cheryl Kickett-Tucker – For significant service to tertiary education, and to the Indigenous community.
- Antoinette Annette Kimmitt – For significant service to business, and to gender equality and inclusion.
- Marie Joan Kormendy – For significant service to people who are deaf or hard of hearing through humanitarian assistance programs.
- Dr David Ian Kram – For significant service to the performing arts, to opera and chamber choirs, and to education.
- Eddie Kutner – For significant service to the property development and financial sectors, and to science.
- Kate Lamont – For significant service to the tourism and hospitality sectors in Western Australia.
- Peter Andrew Lancken – For significant service to business, to the equipment hire and rental industry, and to the community.
- Ian Langford-Brown – For significant service to youth through Scouts, and to the community of the North Shore.
- Lynette Ann Larsen – For significant service to cricket as a player, selector, manager and coach at the elite level.
- Ross Edward Ledger – For significant service to the accounting profession, to wildlife conservation, and to the community.
- Professor Jeffrey Lipman – For significant service to medicine, to anaesthesiology and critical care, and to education.
- Kris Lloyd – For significant service to the artisan cheese making industry, to education, and to tourism.
- Emeritus Professor William Stewart Logan – For significant service to tertiary education, and to cultural heritage research.
- Ming Long – For significant service to the financial and real estate sectors, and to diversity and inclusion.
- Emeritus Professor John William Longworth – For significant service to tertiary education, and to the agricultural sciences.
- Dr Sue Margaret Lopez Atkinson – For significant service to early childhood education, and to the Indigenous community.
- Dr Douglas William Lording – For significant service to medicine, to endocrinology and andrology, and to the community.
- Dr John Robert Macpherson – For significant service to people with a disability, and to access and inclusion.
- Kenneth Ian Macpherson – For significant service to public administration, particularly through executive legal roles.
- Professor Rhonda Pearl Marriott – For significant service to tertiary education, to Indigenous health, and to nursing.
- The Honourable Justice Shane Raymond Marshall – For significant service to the law, and to the judiciary, to industrial relations, and to mental health.
- Dr John Edward Matthews – For significant service to dentistry through professional associations, and to education.
- Dr Susan Jane Mayes – For significant service to physiotherapy, particularly to professional ballet dancers.
- John Francis McKenzie – For significant service to the law, to the legal profession, and to social justice for the Indigenous community.
- Judith Louise Meppem PSM – For significant service to nursing administration, and to community health.
- Elizabeth Ruth Mohle – For significant service to industrial relations, to the nursing profession, and to the superannuation sector.
- Denis Sean Moriarty – For significant service to the community, to social welfare, and to public administration.
- Professor Philip Leo Patrick Morris – For significant service to psychiatry, to medical education, and to professional health organisations.
- Dr Richard Walter Morris BM – For significant service to medicine, and to emergency and disaster medical response.
- Jane Ellen Mottley – For significant service to the law, to the judiciary, and to professional legal bodies.
- David Alexander Muir – For significant service to the community through welfare, social justice and charitable organisations.
- Philip Munz – For significant service to the community through philanthropic initiatives, to medical research, and to business.
- Professor Nicholas Martin Nakata – For significant service to tertiary education, and to learning outcomes for Indigenous students.
- Dr Susan Josephine Neuhaus CSC – For significant service to medicine, to community health, and to veterans and their families.
- Mark Opitz – For significant service to the performing arts, particularly to music production.
- Genevieve Mary Overell – For significant service to the community through roles with a range of organisations.
- Gretel Lees Packer – For significant service to the community, to the visual and performing arts, and to conservation.
- Cecilia Noel Padgham-Purich – For significant service to the Legislative Assembly of the Northern Territory, and to the community through a range of roles.
- Mario Giuseppe Pennisi – For significant service to the biomedical sector, to commercialisation initiatives, and to research.
- Emeritus Professor Roger James Pepperell – For significant service to medical education, particularly to obstetrics and gynaecology.
- Elizabeth Diana Perry – For significant service to tertiary education, to business, and to the community.
- Professor Christine Phillips – For significant service to medical education, to migrant and refugee health, and to medicine.
- Timothy Charles Henry Piper – For significant service to industry and manufacturing, to skills training, and to multicultural youth.
- Emeritus Professor William Raymond Purcell – For significant service to tertiary education, to business, and to Australia-Japan relations.
- Jerril Samantha Rechter – For significant service to community health, to sports administration, and to the arts.
- The Honourable Robert Frank Redlich QC – For significant service to the law, and to the judiciary, to professional groups, and to the community.
- Dr Michael John Redmond RFD – For significant service to medicine, to neurosurgery, and to medical organisations.
- Elizabeth Jane Reid – For significant service to people with a disability, to youth, and to social inclusion.
- Professor Sheena Reilly – For significant service to tertiary education, to medical research, and to paediatric speech pathology.
- Professor Andrew Warwick Roberts – For significant service to medical research, to haematology, and to cancer organisations.
- Bess Rosen – For significant service to women's sport, particularly hockey, to business, and to the community.
- Scott Anthony Saddler – For significant service to public administration, and as a supporter and mentor of Indigenous youth.
- Dr Ian Richard Sare – For significant service to science and technology, to research, and to national security.
- David Christopher Savage – For significant service to Lions Club International, and to rugby union.
- Professor Susan Margaret Sawyer – For significant service to tertiary education, to adolescent health, and to international groups.
- Abe Schneider – For significant service to bicycle motocross, particularly to sports administration.
- Dr David John Schultz – For significant service to veterinary medicine, to zoological societies, and to philanthropy.
- The Honourable Bruce Craig Scott – For significant service to the people and Parliament of Australia, and to the community of South West Queensland.
- Peter John Scott – For significant service to the investment banking sector, and to medical research organisations.
- William James Scott – For significant service to the pharmacy profession at the state and national level.
- The Honourable Kay Patricia Setches – For significant service to the people and Parliament of Victoria, and to women in politics.
- Ross Harry Shardlow – For significant service to the visual arts as a painter, and to maritime history.
- Donna Shepherd – For significant service to children through international humanitarian aid organisations.
- David Glen Slater – For significant service to the community through social welfare and arts organisations.
- Dr Bryan Hamilton Smith – For significant service to the minerals and mining research and exploration sector.
- The Reverend Dr Elizabeth Joyce Smith – For significant service to the Anglican Church of Australia, and to liturgical scholarship.
- Dr Paul Nathaniel Smith – For significant service to orthopaedic medicine as a surgeon, and to medical administration.
- Rosemary Smithson – For significant service to youth, who are homeless, through charitable initiatives.
- Anthony John Snell – For significant service to politics in Victoria, to the community, and to the law.
- The Honourable Lawrence James Springborg – For significant service to the Parliament of Queensland, and to the community of the Southern Downs.
- Ricky John Stephen – For significant service to the tourism and hospitality sectors, particularly as a chef.
- The late Lady Valery Mary Stephen – For significant service to the people of Australia, and to a range of multicultural, cancer support and social welfare organisations.
- Christopher David Stoltz – For significant service to engineering, and to charitable and emergency medical organisations.
- Joan Mabel Stone – For significant service to aged persons through advocacy roles with a range of organisations.
- Antonia Syme – For significant service to visual arts administration, and to maritime archaeology.
- Dr Allan Geoffrey John Terrett – For significant service to the chiropractic profession, to the community of Ballarat, and to archery.
- Professor Ranjeny Thomas – For significant service to medical education and research, and to rheumatology.
- Professor Elizabeth McIntyre Tudor – For significant service to veterinary science, to tertiary education, and to animal welfare.
- Dr Alastair George Tulloch – For significant service to medicine, to urology, and to the community of Claremont.
- Peter John Turnbull – For significant service to business administration, and to corporate governance institutes.
- Charalambos Andrea Vatiliotis – For significant service to musical instrument making as a luthier.
- David John Joseph Vaux – For significant service to the community through charitable initiatives, and to business.
- John Adrian Vogels – For significant service to the Parliament of Victoria, and to the community of the Western Province.
- Dr Richard George Walsh – For significant service to medicine, to anaesthesia and perfusion, and to professional societies.
- Bronwyn Watkins – For significant service to the performing arts through dance administration.
- Dr Jeanette Esther Watson – For significant service to marine science and ecology, and to professional associations.
- Andrew Noel Weidemann – For significant service to primary industry, particularly to the grain producing sector.
- Shlomo Werdiger – For significant service to the Jewish community, and as a philanthropist.
- Terence Carl Wetherall – For significant service to business and commerce, to the superannuation sector, and to the community.
- Herbert Morsley Wharton – For significant service to the literary arts, to poetry, and to the Indigenous community.
- Dr Lyndall Joan White – For significant service to medicine, to psychiatry, and to perinatal and infant mental health.
- Robert John Whitfield – For significant service to the banking and finance sector, and to public administration.
- Raymond Laurence Whitten – For significant service to the law, particularly to legal reform and consumer protection.
- Innes Willox – For significant service to business, particularly to industry, and to the community.
- Antony Harold Curties Windsor – For significant service to the Parliaments of Australia and New South Wales, and to the community of New England.
- Councillor Arron Richard Wood – For significant service to local government, to the environment, and to the community of Melbourne.
- Catherine Maria Wood – For significant service to the superannuation sector, to women, and to trade unions.
- Mike Wood – For significant service to environmental conservation, and to recreation initiatives.
- Distinguished Professor Patricia Yates – For significant service to tertiary education, to cancer and palliative care nursing, and to medical research.
- Professor Jeanine Young – For significant service to tertiary education, to medical research, and to nursing.
- Emeritus Professor Peter Julius Rice Zelas OAM – For significant service to medicine, to health administration, and to humanitarian medical initiatives.

==== Military Division ====
Navy

- Commodore Richard John Boulton RAN – For exceptional performance of duty as the Director General Military Strategic Commitments and the Director of Navy International Engagement.
- Captain Anthony Paul Rayner RAN – For exceptional performance of duty in the fields of Amphibious Capability and Safety Management in Fleet Command.
- Rear Admiral Sarah Edith Sharkey CSC, RAN – For exceptional service to the Australian Defence Force in the management of health care.

Army

- Brigadier Shane Leslie Gabriel DSC – For exceptional service to the development and modernisation of Australian Army capability as Director General Modernisation – Army, Chief of Staff Special Operations Command and as the Military Attaché, Washington.
- Colonel Steven Raymond Gaunt – For exceptional service as Commanding Officer of the 13th Combat Service Support Battalion, Senior Medical Officer, and Deputy Commander of the 13th Brigade.
- Colonel Richard William Parker – For exceptional performance of duties in the fields of international engagement and combined arms training.
- Brigadier Isaac Alexander Gregory Seidel – For exceptional service to the Australian Defence Force in health executive leadership.

Air Force

- Air Commodore Graham John Edwards DSC – For exceptional service to the Australian Defence Force in aerospace acquisition and sustainment, and organisational capability development.
- Group Captain Jennifer Marie Fantini – For exceptional service in aerospace maintenance reform, maintenance productivity improvements, and aircraft maintenance interoperability strategy development for the Royal Australian Air Force.
- Air Commodore Andrew Craig Heap DSC – For exceptional service in aerospace capability management, operational support, and organisational development for the Australian Defence Force.
- Group Captain Karon Millett – For exceptional service to the Australian Defence Force in communications engineering, personnel coaching and Cyberspace Workforce development.
- Group Captain Jane Margaret Wheaton – For exceptional service in workforce development for the Australian Defence Force.

=== Medal of the Order of Australia (OAM) ===
==== General Division ====
- Dr Walter Patrick Leopold Abhayaratna – For service to medicine in the Australian Capital Territory.
- Dr Edmond Arthur Adler – For service to dentistry, and to professional organisations.
- Rose Adler – For service to the community of Murrumburrah-Harden.
- John Leslie Ainsworth – For service to electrical engineering.
- Alison Irene Aitken – For service to the community of the Australian Capital Territory.
- Gary John Aitken – For service to the community of the Wimmera.
- Ronald Maynard Alexander – For service to local government, and to the community of Greater Bendigo.
- Dimitrios Alexopoulos – For service to the Greek community of Victoria.
- Fay Patricia Alford – For service to children.
- Valma Mary Allaway – For service to performing arts administration.
- Rosemary Joy Allen – For service to music education, and to the community.
- Colin Jeffrey Anderson – For service to sport through a range of roles.
- Sandy June Anderson – For service to cancer prevention, and to Aboriginal women's health.
- Bianca Jane Appleford – For service to people living with autism.
- Albert Silvio Apponyi – For service to the visual arts as a sculptor.
- Peter Thomas Arnold – For service to rugby league.
- Robert Arthur Arnold – For service to the community.
- Anne Louise Atkin – For service to people living with Parkinson's disease.
- Mervyn John Bailey – For service to cricket, and to the community of Charters Towers.
- Michael John Bailey – For service to rugby league, and to the community.
- Fay May Baker – For service to choral music.
- Krzysztof Balcerak – For service to the Polish community.
- Cyril Baldock – For service to surf lifesaving.
- Dr Michael Ralph Banyard – For service to veterinary science.
- Dr Peter Gerard Barker – For service to medicine.
- Alan Ross Barnes – For service to veterans and their families.
- Jillian Dorothy Barton – For service to the welfare of equine animals.
- Bernard John Basevi – For service to the community of the Eurobodalla.
- Scott James Beasley – For service to the Australian community in Iraq.
- Raymond Silas Beebe – For service to youth through Scouts, and to the community.
- Dr Jenine Peta Beekhuyzen – For service to information technology, and to women.
- Dr David Robert Bell – For service to medicine, and to professional organisations.
- Robert Leslie Bensley – For service to the community of Inverell.
- Rita Bentley – For service to the environment, and to hobby prospecting and small scale mining.
- Machiel Johan Berghuis – For service to the community through music.
- Marie Joy Billington – For service to early childhood education and therapy.
- The late Ernest Anthony Bilson – For service to the restaurant and catering industry.
- Melvyn Geoffrey Blachford – For service to the pharmacy profession, and to jazz music.
- Lorraine Norma Blair – For service to the community.
- Dr George Wright Blenkhorn – For service to the community of Pakenham.
- Maria Rosaleen Boland – For service to nursing.
- Greig Kingsley Bolderrow – For service to the broadcast media, and to the community of the Fraser Coast.
- Patrick Joseph Bollen – For service to the community, and to sailing.
- John Henry Bonwick – For service to caving and karsting.
- Dr Margaret Helen Bowering – For service to higher education.
- Rodney Eric Bramich – For service to the community of Port Sorell.
- Kerry Anne Bray – For service to running, and to the community.
- The Honourable Lynette Ruth Breuer – For service to the Parliament of South Australia, and to local government.
- Gary Frederick Briggs – For service to the manufacturing sector in Queensland.
- Dr Arthur Michael Briner – For service to the Jewish community, and to ophthalmology.
- Kenneth James Broadhead RFD – For service to the community.
- Robert Darrell Brown – For service to veterans and their families.
- Rosemary Helen Brown – For service to the community of Queenscliff.
- Walter Henry Brown – For service to the international community of Phuket.
- William Thomas Brown – For service to the community of Queenscliff.
- Kim Michelle Buckingham – For service to the community of the Northern Beaches.
- Christopher Francis Bulmer – For service to the building and construction industry.
- Raymond Peter Burgess – For service to the entertainment industry, and to the community.
- Maxwell Oliver Burnside – For service to community history.
- Neville John Burrows – For service to the Uniting Church in Australia, and to the community.
- Nyurpaya Kaika Burton – For service to Indigenous visual art, and to the community.
- Craig Kingston Bush – For service to conservation, and to the community of East Gippsland.
- Yvonne Cains – For service to the community of Port Macquarie.
- Kevan Izod Carroll – For service to cricket.
- David John Carruthers – For service to the community.
- Kristine Julie Carter – For service to women, and to the community.
- Peter Frederick Chadwick – For service to the community.
- Anne Chater – For service to the community of Theodore.
- Stefanos Christofis – For service to the Greek Orthodox community of Darwin.
- Neville John Clark – For service to veterans and their families.
- Sister Margaret Mary Cleary – For service to the Catholic Church of Australia.
- Margaret Ethel Cliff – For service to netball.
- Jennifer Ann Coleman – For service to community mental health.
- John Alfred Coles – For service to the real estate finance sector, and to public administration.
- Sister Kate Conley RSM – For service to the Catholic Church of Australia, and to women.
- Dr Peter Conrad – For service to vascular medicine, and to professional organisations.
- Dr David Rolla Cooke – For service to medicine, and to aviation.
- Maxwell Herbert Cooper – For service to dentistry, and to the community of Dubbo.
- Patricia Olive Cooper – For service to the community.
- Margaret McRae Cornwell – For service to the community of the Australian Capital Territory.
- Peter Costantini – For service to business, particularly to education and training.
- John Coutis – For service to the community, and to sport.
- Keith Mervyn Cowen – For service to arts administration.
- Denise Patricia Craig – For service to people living with dementia and their support networks.
- The Reverend Dr Peter Campbell Crawford – For service to the Anglican Church of Australia, and to the community.
- Professor Julia Louise Crilly – For service to emergency care nursing.
- Josie Crisara – For service to education, and to professional associations.
- Jennifer Louise Cross – For service to children and families impacted by dyslexia.
- Nicole Jane Cumpston – For service to the museums and galleries sector, and to Indigenous art.
- Janice Grace Cunningham – For service to Australia-United States Military Commemorations.
- Philip Cunningham – For service to medical research, and to sexual health medicine.
- Ronald Edward Cussen – For service to the community, and to the building and construction industry.
- John Douglas D'Arcy – For service to the performing arts, particularly to music.
- Gordon Barry Dahl – For service to lawn bowls.
- Annabelle Juliet Daniel – For service to women through social welfare initiatives.
- Dr John Louis Daniels – For service to Indigenous health.
- Ekaterina (Katya) Danova – For service to the broadcast and print media, and to the Russian community.
- Geoffrey Allan Dare – For service to veterans, and to military historical research.
- Sue Davenport – For service to the Indigenous communities of the Western Desert.
- Joseph Henry Davidson – For service to the community of the Illawarra.
- Graham John Davis – For service to sport in South Australia.
- The late Dr Ian Richard Davis – For service to people living with Motor Neurone Disease, and to medicine.
- Graham Peter Colliver Day – For service to the livestock industry.
- John William Deacon – For service to the performing arts, and to education.
- Vera Frances Deacon – For service to community history, and to conservation.
- Lorraine Debreczeni – For service to seniors.
- Brian William Debus – For service to primary education.
- Margaret Anne Dent – For service to the community.
- Carol Buck Dettmann – For service to the community, and to publishing.
- Robyn Louise Devenish – For service to the international community of Cambodia.
- Dr Frances Maree Devlin-Glass – For service to education, and to the Irish community.
- Dom Bartholomew Dimattina – For service to the community of Melbourne through a range of roles.
- Mary Patricia Dittmar – For service to the community through social welfare initiatives.
- James Robert Doak – For service to the community of the Illawarra.
- Rae Winsome Doak – For service to the community of the Illawarra.
- Claire Jean Mary Doherty – For service to physiotherapy.
- Maria Antonietta Donato – For service to the Italian community of South Australia.
- Michel Doueihi – For service to the Lebanese community.
- Carolyn Dianne Douglas – For service to the law, and to the judiciary.
- Julie Elizabeth Dowleans – For service to the community of Wee Waa.
- John Robartson Down – For service to the community of Mudgeeraba.
- Caroline Isobel Downer – For service to the visual and performing arts through a range of roles.
- Maree Louise Duffield – For service to the community of Hobsons Bay.
- Robin Elizabeth Dunham – For service to the community of Wagin.
- Dr Kim Frances Dunphy – For service to community health through dance movement therapy.
- Christine Dunstan – For service to the performing arts as a producer and mentor.
- Peta Louise Edebone – For service to softball as an athlete and coach.
- Isabella Fay Edgoose – For service to the community, and to education.
- Colin Rex Edwards – For service to the preservation of the Heysen Trail.
- Meredith Lee Edwards – For service to education.
- David John Ellis – For service to seafarers through charitable initiatives, and to the community.
- The late Jill Bernadette Emberson – For service to people living with ovarian cancer.
- Professor Adrian Hellier Evans – For service to legal education, and to the law.
- Frank Stuart Evans – For service to the international community of Timor Leste.
- Dr Barry Samuel Fatovich – For service to medicine, and to professional organisations.
- Lillian Judith Fawcett – For service to the community of Clunes.
- Patricia June Fennell – For service to women's health in rural and remote Queensland.
- John Charles Ferguson – For service to local government, and to the community of the Bulloo Shire.
- Dr Ray Gwynne Ferguson – For service to veterinary science.
- Toni Frances Field – For service to netball, and to the community.
- Raymond William Finn – For service to the community.
- Tammy Maree Flett – For service to the community of Albany.
- Greg Wallace Fordham – For service to the aviation transport industry.
- Peter John Foster – For service to community history.
- Rosslyn Marie Fox – For service to the performing arts.
- James Alexander Freeman – For service to the community through fundraising initiatives.
- Maxwell John Friend – For service to children.
- Rebecca Jane Frizelle – For service to the automotive sector, and to rugby league.
- Grazia Gammaldi – For service to the community of Melbourne.
- Saki George Ganella – For service to education.
- Dr Ben Ami Gelin – For service to music, and to the community of Bathurst.
- Lynette Margaret George – For service to the engineering and manufacturing sectors.
- Leo Anthony Geraghty – For service to the community of Murgon.
- Laszlo Gescheit – For service to the Jewish community of Melbourne.
- Scott Lee Gibbons – For service to the community through charitable organisations.
- Bruce Cater Gibson-Wilde – For service to the community of Townsville.
- Thomas John George Gilmore – For service to local government, and to the community of Mareeba.
- Simon Gipson – For service to secondary education.
- Helen Grace Gobbi – For service to community history.
- Caroline Tottie Goldsmith – For service to the community, and to the performing arts.
- Colleen Monica Goodwin – For service to the community.
- David Paul Graham – For service to the community.
- Prue Gregory – For service to the law, and to the community.
- Janice Grice – For service to the community of Darwin.
- Donald Griffin – For service to the accounting profession, and to athletics.
- Noel Griffith – For service to music, and to the community.
- Gloria Dawn Grocott – For service to the community.
- Michael John Gusterson – For service to marine seismic surveying.
- Associate Professor Hadia Haikal-Mukhtar – For service to medicine, and to the Lebanese community.
- Amara Hamid – For service to women, and to the multicultural community of Melbourne.
- Christopher Ian Hammond – For service to the community of Wanneroo.
- Thomas Graham Hampton – For service to veterans.
- Bevin Hardy – For service to the community of Bomaderry, and to youth through Scouts.
- Kevin Charles Hardy – For service to rugby league.
- William David Hardy – For service to the wine industry.
- Frances Lynette Harrison – For service to Indigenous visual art, and to the community.
- Merinda Harrison-Drake – For service to Indigenous health in Gippsland.
- Brother Nicholas Patrick Harsas – For service to education, and to the Catholic Church of Australia.
- Ralph David Hartland – For service to the community.
- Margaret Frances Harvison – For service to the performing arts.
- Dr Brian Richard Hassett – For service to medicine, and to the community of Ballarat.
- Michael John Hawke – For service to community mental health.
- Lennie Ian Hayes – For service to Indigenous visual art, and to the community.
- Manfred Ernst Heide – For service to native animal welfare and conservation.
- Robin Patricia Henderson – For service to the community through charitable initiatives.
- William Eric Henderson – For service to community and military history.
- Elizabeth Fay Hern – For service to the community of Boonah.
- Douglas Albert Hewitt – For service to the communities of Armidale and Nambucca Heads.
- Michael Edward Hickey – For service to veterans and their families, and to the community.
- Lieutenant Colonel James Glen Hislop (Retd) – For service to veterans and their families.
- Noel Hoffman – For service to the conservation of native orchids.
- Gary Peter Hollindale – For service to the community of Beenleigh.
- Thomas Herbert Holmes – For service to surf lifesaving, and to the community.
- Jeffrey Charles Horn – For service to the road freight transport industry.
- Beverley June Horwood – For service to the community of Ballarat, and to swimming.
- Mark Charles Hoskinson AFSM – For service to primary industry, and to the community.
- Walter Neville Howell – For service to rowing.
- George Leslie Hulse – For service to veterans.
- Bruce Malcolm Hunt – For service to the community of Gladstone.
- Kevin Henry Hurman – For service to veterans and their families.
- June Rosemary Hutchison – For service to the community of Fremantle.
- Dr Judy Hyde – For service to clinical psychology, and to professional associations.
- Claudia Hyles – For service to the community of the Australian Capital Territory.
- Kevin Baxter Ingram – For service to rugby league, particularly through administrative roles.
- Francis Richard Ireland – For service to the community of Cairns through a range of roles.
- The late Wendy Iris Ireland – For service to music education.
- Donald Stewart Ives – For service to music, and to the community.
- Dr Kenneth James Jackson – For service to horticultural research.
- Dalma Myra Jacobs – For service to women in tertiary education.
- Helen Edith James – For service to the community.
- Ronald Raymond James – For service to veterans and their families.
- Keith Ross Jamieson – For service to country music, and to the community.
- Peter Johnson – For service to the Indigenous communities of the Western Desert.
- Rick Johnson – For service to the community, and to motorcycling.
- The late John Johnston – For service to the community through a range of roles.
- Christopher David Jones – For service to the community of Hobart.
- Olwyn Joy Jones – For service to ex-prisoners of war and their families.
- Patricia Arthea Jones – For service to women, and to the community.
- Donald Sherwood Juers – For service to powerlifting, and to the community.
- Marjorie Kathleen Kable – For service to the community of Finley.
- Aaron Kearney – For service to the broadcast media as a radio presenter.
- Norman Lyle Keats – For service to lawn bowls.
- Karen Lee Kemp – For service to nursing, and to the community.
- Donald Edward Kennedy – For service to veterans, and to the community.
- Keith Charles Kent – For service to the community through a range of roles.
- Debra Leigh Keogh – For service to softball.
- Diane Lesley Kershaw – For service to the visual arts.
- Christine Killinger – For service to the community of the Blue Mountains.
- Michael Anthony King – For service to the project management sector.
- Professor Natalie Rebecca King – For service to the contemporary visual arts.
- Trevor King – For service to youth through Scouts, and to the community.
- Stephen Kinmond – For service to the community through complaint investigation and resolution roles.
- Arthur George Knee – For service to the community of Tatura.
- Betty Lurline Knee – For service to the community of Tatura.
- Robert Francis Kneipp – For service to the community through a range of roles.
- Rosanna Kobiela-Horn – For service to table tennis.
- Pauline Andrea Kontelj – For service to the community of Geelong.
- Robert Nicholas Korotcoff – For service to the community.
- Monika Laczofy – For service to music education.
- Noel Geoffrey Lake – For service to veterans and their families.
- Josephine Kamshan Lam – For service to the Chinese community, and to education.
- Catherine Larkins – For service to Indigenous visual art, and to the community.
- John Larter – For service to softball.
- Brian Lasky – For service to golf.
- Bruce Sun-You Lew – For service to the Chinese community of Melbourne.
- Sheena McCallum Liley – For service to the community of Toowoomba.
- Julie Anne Limbach – For service to the community through social welfare initiatives.
- Professor Adrian Matthew Linacre – For service to forensic science.
- Graeme Ellwood Litster – For service to water polo.
- Graham Keith Lockwood RFD, ED – For service to the community through a range of roles.
- Susan May Lockwood – For service to education.
- Dr Burt Gerard Look – For service to geotechnical engineering.
- Georgina Catherine Loughnan – For service to people living with Prader-Willi Syndrome.
- Dr John Allan Lowndes – For service to the law, and to the judiciary.
- Geena Desiree Luckin – For service to the community.
- Graham Manson Ludecke – For service to the community of Sandringham.
- Ruby May Luder – For service to the community, and to veterans.
- Angela Lyris – For service to education.
- Aileen Jeanne MacDonald – For service to the community of Guyra.
- Emeritus Professor Roy Malcolm Macleod – For service to education, particularly to history.
- Andrew James Macneill – For service to tennis, and to the accountancy profession.
- Mario Magris – For service to boxing.
- Helen Esther Mahemoff – For service to Holocaust education and remembrance.
- Gregory Raymond Malavey – For service to people with a disability, and to the community of the Eurobodalla.
- Luz (Lucy) Oscar Marin – For service to the health and rehabilitation of refugees.
- William Henry Marklew – For service to industrial relations, particularly to trade unions.
- Dr Jennifer Martin – For service to emergency medicine.
- James Thomas Massey – For service to the community through emergency response organisations.
- Dr Emily Helene Matters – For service to education, and to professional associations.
- William Raymond McArthur – For service to local government, and to the community of the Golden Plains shire.
- Patrick Gregory McCabe – For service to hockey.
- Alfred William McCarthy – For service to the community of Yass.
- Donald Allen McClements – For service to the community of Pinjarra.
- Kerrith McDermott – For service to public administration in Queensland.
- Professor Graham McDowell – For service to the dairy industry, and to education.
- Colleen Mavis McGann – For service to community health in Tasmania.
- Janice Dorothea McGlinn – For service to seniors through wellbeing programs.
- Nancy Ellen McGregor – For service to the community of Young.
- Helen McIntyre – For service to animal welfare.
- David Charles McKenzie – For service to community health, and to federal and local government.
- Janice Elaine McLellan – For service to the community of Bordertown.
- Felix Gerald Meagher – For service to Celtic music and dance.
- Dr Sarah Elizabeth Medland – For service to medical research in the field of genetics.
- Dr Safwat Sobhy Mesiha – For service to the Coptic Orthodox Church, and to the community.
- Bruce Harrison Meyer – For service to local government, and to the community of West Wimmera.
- Dr Wendy Faye Michaels – For service to women, and to the dramatic arts.
- Ian Houghton Miffling – For service to local government, and to the community of Collie.
- Amanda Milledge – For service to the community through charitable foundations.
- Bruce James Miller – For service to veterans and their families.
- Julie Millowick – For service to the visual arts, particularly to photography.
- Joyce Mills – For service to the community of Koo Wee Rup.
- Florence Ellen Monaghan – For service to netball.
- Dr Joseph Ken Montarello – For service to medicine, particularly to cardiology.
- John Nimon Mooney PSM – For service to education, and to professional organisations.
- The Reverend Rodney Victor Moore – For service to the community through chaplaincy roles in corrective institutions.
- Barbara Susan Morgan – For service to the Jewish community of Victoria.
- Jeffrey Bruce Morgan – For service to the visual arts, and to the community.
- The late Susan A Morse – For service to children's health, particularly through speech pathology.
- The late Carolyn Edith Moule – For service to education, and to mathematics.
- The late John Mathew Muir – For service to the community through a range of roles.
- Lisa Mumbin – For service to the Indigenous community of the Northern Territory.
- James Grant Mumme – For service to conservation and the environment.
- Peter Mungkuri – For service to Indigenous visual art, and to the community.
- Bruce John Murphy – For service to the community of the Shoalhaven.
- Dr Gerald Roy Murphy – For service to medicine.
- Robyn Jean Murray – For service to the community.
- Ken Neil Murtagh – For service to youth, and to education.
- Vincent Namatjira – For service to Indigenous visual art, and to the community.
- Noel Henry Nancarrow – For service to local government, and to the community of the Murray shire.
- Wendy Mildred Naylor – For service to veterans and their families.
- Leanne Neal – For service to youth, and to nursing.
- Barry Colin Need – For service to the Uniting Church in Australia.
- Dr Joanna Eliza Newton – For service to agriculture through scientific research.
- Dr John Vincent Newton – For service to medicine, particularly to plastic surgery.
- Kenneth Nimmo – For service to the community.
- Daniel Luke O'Brien – For service to veterans and their families.
- Peter Maurice Olde – For service to Australian native flora.
- Ian Hamilton Orchard – For service to the community.
- Bruce George Page – For service to the communities of Peachester and Beerwah.
- Janet May Page – For service to the community, and to education.
- Ross Mervyn Paine – For service to the community.
- Brenda Palmer – For service to the community of Malvern.
- Scott Pape – For service to the community, and to financial education.
- Dr Ann Elizabeth Parker – For service to medicine, and to the community.
- Bruce Robert Parker – For service to the community, and to the automotive industry.
- Bede Parkes – For service to the community of Helensburgh.
- Dr Mulavana Santhadevi Parvathy – For service to medicine, and to medical education.
- Gregory David Paterson – For service to the performing arts, particularly to music.
- Jillian Ruth Paterson – For service to the community of Meningie.
- William Robert Paterson – For service to the community of Meningie, and to natural resource conservation.
- Simon Francis Patmore – For service to snowboarding as a Gold Medallist at the Pyeongchang 2018 Paralympic Games.
- The late Ian Gordon Paton – For service to the community of Wynyard.
- Anne Christine Payne – For service to the community of Blackburn.
- Robert Stephen Peak – For service to Australian rules football, and to sports administration.
- Geoffrey Denham Penley – For service to the building and construction industry.
- Edna Florence Pennicott – For service to the community of Kingborough.
- Robert Henry Perkins – For service to film and television production and set design.
- Adriaan Johannes Peschar – For service to the community of Newcastle.
- Mark Anthony Peters – For service to sports administration, and to baseball.
- George Petrou – For service to the visual arts, and to veterans.
- Fran Pfeiffer – For service to the community.
- Lola Mary Phillips – For service to women, and to the community of Sorell.
- Billie Pidwell – For service to sport, particularly to baseball.
- Andrew Robert Pierce – For service to the community, and to accountancy.
- Dr Roger Hugh Pillemer – For service to community health through medical advisory roles.
- Georgina May Pinkas – For service to the community of the Australian Capital Territory.
- Alison Plain – For service to the international community of Indonesia through eye health programs.
- Graeme Maxwell Plumridge – For service to veterans and their families, and to the community.
- Philia Angela Polites – For service to people with a disability, and to the community.
- Darryl John Pope – For service to surf lifesaving, and to music education.
- Marjorie Maude Porter – For service to the community of Numurkah.
- Lakshman Prasad-Alluri – For service to the Indian community of the Australian Capital Territory.
- Gerard Joseph Price – For service to cricket, and to the community.
- Anna Kristina Prosser – For service to women, and to the community of the Australian Capital Territory.
- Phyllis Eva Proud – For service to the community of Perth.
- Iva Annette Quarisa – For service to primary industry, particularly to irrigation management.
- Fariborez Rameshfar – For service to remote communities in Far North Queensland.
- Valerie Adeline Randell – For service to dancesport.
- Dr Rama Rao – For service to Indian music and dance.
- Bruce John Raymond – For service to music, particularly to brass bands.
- Kenneth Rayner – For service to horticulture as a mango breeder.
- Christopher Mark Reardon – For service to youth.
- Katrina Elizabeth Reynen – For service to education.
- Daphne May Rich – For service to the community of the Blackall region.
- Dr Kenneth Rigby – For service to education, and to the well-being of young people.
- Andrew James Rindfleish – For service to softball.
- Catherine Marie Rogers – For service to chamber music.
- Colonel Michael James Romalis (Retd) – For service to veterans and their families.
- Wayne John Rose – For service to boxing.
- Douglas John Roser – For service to the community, and to engineering.
- Fran Rowe – For service to the rural community of New South Wales.
- John Cliveden William Rudd – For service to veterans and their families, and to accountancy.
- Jenetta Helen Russell – For service to the community, and to business.
- Darren James Rutherford – For service to the community, and to business.
- Saara Sandra Sabbagh – For service to women, and to the Muslim community of Victoria.
- Sivaganga Sahathevan – For service to the Indian community of Victoria, and to music.
- James Michael Scaysbrook – For service to motorcycling.
- Barry McGown Scott – For service to animal conservation, and to the community.
- Dr Sithamparapillai Thava Seelan – For service to medicine, and to professional colleges.
- Shobha Sekhar – For service to Indian music and dance.
- Malcolm Henry Seymour – For service to agriculture through roles with a range of associations.
- Yvonne Margaret Shakes – For service to the community of Adelaide.
- George Henry Shales – For service to surf lifesaving.
- Harold Sharp – For service to the community, and to charitable initiatives.
- Robert John Shaw – For service to the community of Whyalla.
- Murray Theodore Sherwell AFSM – For service to the community of the Limestone Coast.
- Hardy Chi-Fong Shum – For service to the Chinese community of Manningham.
- Dr Heather Gaynor Simmons – For service to medicine, particularly to women's health.
- Dr Ivan Joseph Simmons – For service to medicine, particularly to dermatology.
- Dr Jaelea Skehan – For service to community mental health and wellbeing.
- Hugh Alexander Small – For service to surf lifesaving, and to athletics.
- Michael Alan Smith – For service to journalism, and to the public relations sector.
- Valerie Catherine Smith-Orr – For service to the international community through nursing.
- Gary Andrew Somerville – For service to cricket, and to the community.
- Dr Harold Paul Spiro – For service to paediatric ophthalmology.
- Marie Evelyn Standen – For service to refugees, and to the community of the Blue Mountains.
- Anthony Athol Stevenson – For service to veterans and their families.
- Miles Stephen Stewart – For service to triathlon, and to sports administration.
- Chaplain Gary John Stone – For service to veterans and their families.
- Marion Joyce Stott – For service to the community of Mooroolbark.
- Jacqueline Suares – For service to people with a disability.
- Ronald Maxwell Sullivan – For service to the community through social welfare organisations.
- Gwen Swadling – For service to veterans and their families.
- Jenny Taing – For service to the financial and investment sectors, and to the community.
- Robert Stuart Tait – For service to aviation education.
- Domenica Mimi Tamburrino – For service to the community of Moreland, and to the Australian Labor Party.
- Tjunkaya Tapaya – For service to Indigenous visual art, and to the community.
- Alo Tapim – For service to the Indigenous community of the Torres Strait.
- Muuki Taylor – For service to the Indigenous communities of the Western Desert.
- Elizabeth Jane Telford – For service to people living with polio, and to the community.
- David Colin Teufel – For service to youth through Scouts.
- Robyn Chaille Teufel – For service to youth through Scouts.
- Richard John Thomson – For service to the conservation of Australian native orchids.
- David Stanley Thurley – For service to local government, and to the community of Albury.
- Peter Francis Toon – For service to rowing.
- Phuoc Thang Tran – For service to the Indo-Chinese community of New South Wales.
- Dr Peter Tregear – For service to music education, and to professional organisations.
- Diane Trestrail – For service to people living with Parkinson's, and to the community.
- Olive Patricia Trevor – For service to horticulture through the cultivation of bromeliads.
- Dr William Huyliem Trinh – For service to international humanitarian medical programs, and to optometry.
- Tashi Tsering – For service to Buddhism, and to education.
- The late Lynette Irene Vaak – For service to the community, particularly to women and young girls.
- Mona Ann Vagg – For service to the community of Ivanhoe.
- Dr John Edward Vaughan – For service to medicine, and to surf lifesaving.
- Anthony Maxwell Venn-Brown – For service to the LGBTIQ community.
- Lena Vicary – For service to the community of Echuca.
- Peter Ross Wadewitz – For service to the organic recycling industry.
- Conjoint Professor Paul Walker – For service to paediatric medicine, and to professional organisations.
- Alison Garry Walpole – For service to the community of Whorouly.
- Anne Francis Walsh – For service to people with an intellectual disability.
- Maryanne Elizabeth Walsh – For service to education.
- Dr Laurie Scott Warfe – For service to medicine, and to the community.
- Robyn Ann Waters – For service to the real estate industry, and to the community.
- David Peter Watson – For service to public administration, particularly to courts of law.
- Colin Watts – For service to the harness racing industry.
- Desmond Watts – For service to the tourism accommodation sector.
- Lee Webb – For service to veterans and their families.
- Diane Westaway – For service to women's sport and recreation, and to charitable initiatives.
- Marcus Westbury – For service to the contemporary arts.
- Colin Ernest Weston – For service to the Uniting Church in Australia, and to the community.
- Karen Jane Williams – For service to Indigenous education through literacy programs.
- Corporal Matthew James Williams – For service to the community through brain cancer awareness initiatives.
- The late Mumu Mike Williams – For service to Indigenous visual art, and to the community.
- Joanne Manintja Willmot – For service to the Indigenous community of South Australia.
- Jean Gladys Wilmot – For service to sailing, and to dance education.
- The late John Roger Wilson – For service to the community through a range of roles.
- Naomi Kate Wilson – For service to the people and Parliament of Queensland.
- Rex Croydon Wilson – For service to education, and to the community of Tasmania.
- Vicki Louise Wilson – For service to the community of Bathurst.
- Stuart Andrew Woodward – For service to the banking and finance sector, and to the Uniting Church in Australia.
- Margaret Anne Wortley – For service to the community of Naracoorte.
- Bruce Edward Wright – For service to the community of Tumbarumba.
- Nola Younghusband – For service to education.
- Elizabeth Anne Zachulski – For service to aged care, and to nursing.
- Rachael Zaltron – For service to children and young people.
- Paul John Zammit – For service to the parliaments of Australia and New South Wales, and to the community.

==== Military Division ====
Navy

- Warrant Officer Stephen Gregory Cheeseman – For meritorious performance of duty in the fields of Naval Aviation and personnel mentoring and management in the Royal Australian Navy.
- Lieutenant Commander Wayne Terance Richards RAN – For meritorious service in the field of Navy marine and port services support.
- Chief Petty Officer Bradley Gary Walsh – For meritorious performance of duty in the field of Navy training in particular Physical Training and Leadership Development.
- Captain Allen Mark Whittaker CSC, RAN – For meritorious service in the field of Navy aviation capability development.

Army

- Warrant Officer Class One Brian James Buskell CSM – For meritorious service to the Australian Army in leadership, cultural reform and tactical expertise.
- Warrant Officer Class One Michael Stephen Clarke – For meritorious performance of duty as a Regimental Sergeant Major in the Australian Army.
- Warrant Officer Class One Tony Lionel Kennedy – For meritorious service to the Australian Defence Force in personnel management, training and leadership.
- Warrant Officer Class One David Graeme McBean – For meritorious service as the Artificer Sergeant Major of Forces Command and the 2nd Cavalry Regiment, and the Senior Technical Advisor Small Arms at the Land Engineering Agency.
- Warrant Officer Class One Faith Marie Miller – For meritorious service in enhancing Army's contribution to Indigenous employment and logistics training.
- Captain Ross Geoffrey Pringle – For meritorious service to the Australian Defence Force as a Regimental Quartermaster.
- Major Ian Markham Tibbits CSM – For meritorious performance of duty in the field of Australian Army Cadets.

Air Force

- Wing Commander Steven Charles Parsons CSC – For meritorious performance of duties in Very Important Persons Operations at the Air Mobility Control Centre; and in the provision of airbase support and cultural reform as Commanding Officer of Number 13 Squadron, Royal Australian Air Force.
- Warrant Officer Paul Robert Shepherd – For meritorious service in the field of airborne electronic warfare development.

== Meritorious Service ==
=== Public Service Medal (PSM) ===
Public Service Medal ribbon

Commonwealth

- Jennifer Patricia Carlson – For outstanding public service in supporting the Cabinet.
- Mark Anthony Coffey – For outstanding public service to complex policy development and delivery of significant reforms, improving program outcomes for people in northern Australia.
- Alan Paul Davidson – For outstanding public service through innovative program digitisation and development for Welfare Payment Infrastructure.
- Leo James Hardiman – For outstanding public service through the provision of legal services to the Commonwealth.
- Cheryl Anne Jenkins – For outstanding public service through the delivery of social work programs and services to people affected by disasters.
- Deborah Lee McGuire – For outstanding public service to high level delivery of whole-of-government security risk management for special events.
- James Douglas Passmore – For outstanding public service in complex policy development and facilitation of Australia's engagement in infrastructure development in the Pacific region.
- Dr Lisa Strelein – For outstanding public service to improving awareness across the Australian Public Service of Aboriginal and Torres Strait Islander culture, and to the debate on native title.
- Norman Leslie Wotherspoon – For outstanding public service in leading the provision of Centrelink services to the Western Downs region of Queensland.

Australian Capital Territory

- Coralie Anne McAlister – For outstanding public service to education in the Australian Capital Territory.

New South Wales

- Dr Geoffrey Laurence Allan – For outstanding public service to New South Wales, and to aquaculture science.
- Natalie Camilleri – For outstanding public service to infrastructure projects in New South Wales.
- Eric Claussen – For outstanding public service to the New South Wales National Parks and Wildlife Service.
- Melinda Anne Commens – For outstanding public service to education in New South Wales, particularly to families of children with disabilities.
- Anthony (Tony) Gerard Donoghue – For outstanding public service to local government in New South Wales.
- John Joseph Morahan – For outstanding public service to the New South Wales Police Force.
- Noelani Verina Reardon – For outstanding public service to road safety in New South Wales.
- Jane Elizabeth Simmons – For outstanding public service to education in New South Wales.
- Joanne Lee Wallace – For outstanding public service to Corrective Services in New South Wales.
- Jane Amelia Wynter – For outstanding public service to the visual arts and cultural sector in New South Wales.

Queensland

- Desmond Allen Howard – For outstanding public service to local government in Queensland.
- Rachel Hunter – For outstanding public service to the community of Queensland through a range of roles.
- Michael John Walsh – For outstanding public service to the health sector in Queensland.
- Zijian Zhang – For outstanding public service to the trade and investment sector in Queensland.

South Australia

- Jacqueline Costanzo – For outstanding public service to the communities of the APY Lands in South Australia.
- Erik Dahl – For outstanding public service to natural and cultural heritage preservation and conservation in South Australia.
- David Paul Engelhardt – For outstanding public service to the education sector in South Australia.

Victoria

- Hakan Akyol – For outstanding public service to multicultural policy design and program delivery in Victoria.
- Christina Asquini – For outstanding public service to innovative policy design and service delivery in Victoria.
- Dr Graeme John Emonson – For outstanding public service to local government in Victoria.
- Moira Findlay – For outstanding public service to education in Victoria.
- Dallas John Reilly – For outstanding public service to policy and program delivery in support of community safety in Victoria.

Western Australia

- Michael Anthony Barnes – For outstanding public service to state government finances in Western Australia.
- Heather Gaye Brayford – For outstanding public service to legislative reform and policy development in Western Australia.
- John Frederick Fischer – For outstanding public service to the community of Western Australia through a range of roles.

=== Australian Police Medal (APM) ===
Australian Police Medal ribbon

Federal

- Detective Inspector Stephen Douglas Ladd
- Senior Constable Mark-Alan Lim

New South Wales

- Chief Inspector Nicole Louise Bruce
- Detective Superintendent Daniel Robert Doherty
- Sergeant Jeffrey Ronald Farmer BM
- Detective Chief Inspector Peter Faux
- Superintendent Stephen Gregory Hegarty BM
- Chief Inspector John Klepczarek
- Sergeant Ian Cameron Miller
- Detective Superintendent Murray James Reynolds
- Detective Chief Inspector Gregory James Thomas

Northern Territory

- Detective Senior Sergeant Robert Colin Jordan
- Commander David Proctor

Queensland

- Inspector Tracy Lee Dale
- Senior Sergeant Nicole Leesa Fox
- Sergeant Ian John Leavers
- Inspector Wayne David Rasmussen
- Senior Sergeant David James Rutherford
- Inspector Phillip Allan Stevens
- Sergeant Karlene Louise Trezise

South Australia

- Detective Senior Sergeant Michelle Lisa Cahalan
- Senior Sergeant First Class Trevor Lindsay Milne
- Detective Chief Superintendent Craig William Patterson

Tasmania

- Inspector Glen Gordon Ball

Victoria

- Superintendent Belinda Lee Bales
- Detective Senior Sergeant Karen Bennett
- Inspector Wayne Frederick Cheesman
- Assistant Commissioner Michael John Grainger
- Detective Senior Sergeant Gary Kenneth Marks
- Detective Senior Sergeant Stephen William McIntyre
- Leading Senior Constable Joanne Wendy Mutsaerts
- Detective Leading Senior Constable Kathleen Anne Squire
- Assistant Commissioner Glenn Weir
- Inspector Peter Francis Wheeler
- Superintendent Jenny Lorraine Wilson

Western Australia

- Detective Sergeant Alan Millar
- Sergeant Siobhan Collett O'Loughlin
- Inspector Shane Sadler
- Superintendent Valdo Sorgiovanni

=== Australian Fire Service Medal (AFSM) ===
AFSM ribbon

Australian Capital Territory

- Christopher John Zeitlhofer

New South Wales

- Frank Austin
- Morgan James Cook
- Mark Steven Dobson
- Kenneth Mark Eglington
- John Andrew Foster
- Dennis Wayne Henry
- David John Hitchcock
- Terrence John Job
- Peter Stanley Miranda
- Michael Bernard Neyland
- Christopher Allen Sharp

Northern Territory

- Darrin Thomas Weetra

Queensland

- Malcolm Eric Stacey
- Michelle Christine Young

South Australia

- Matthew Paul Davis
- Kenneth James Hall
- John Stanley Mudge

Victoria

- Russell Pardew
- Robin Noel Parsons
- Ian Ronald Symons

Western Australia

- James Palmiro Armanasco
- Warren John Day
- Peter Crosby Sutton

=== Ambulance Service Medal (ASM) ===
ASM ribbon

New South Wales

- Peter Ian Elliott
- Steven Alan Lobley
- Alan John Morrison

Queensland

- Ian Trevor Richter
- Lynette Yvonne Richter

South Australia

- Michael Berden
- John Laurence Shute

=== Emergency Services Medal (ESM) ===
ESM ribbon

New South Wales

- Michelle Elizabeth Jenkins
- Glenn Martin Sullivan
- Ross Constable
- Ronald James Calman OAM

Queensland

- Nicole Monica Bradley
- Edward Conrad Cowie

South Australia

- Dermot Barry

Victoria

- John Leitch Hennessy
- Darren Martin McLeod
- Eileen Adrienne Murray

Western Australia

- Danny Goodlad
- David Jason Price

=== Australian Corrections Medal (ACM) ===
ACM ribbon

New South Wales

- Louisa Emmy Van Mal
- Marty Van Vegchel
- Andrew Clive Child

Northern Territory

- Mandy Crow

Queensland

- Darryll Graham Fleming
- Gabrielle Elizabeth Payne

South Australia

- James Edward Rutter

Victoria

- Nolene Elizabeth McDougall
- Michael Francis Cullinan
- Patrick Anthony McCormick
- Mario Nuzzo

== Distinguished and Conspicuous Service ==
=== Second Bar to the Distinguished Service Medal (DSM and Two Bars) ===
Army

- Lieutenant Colonel L – For distinguished command and leadership in warlike operations as the Commander Special Operations Task Group 632 while deployed on Operation OKRA.

=== Distinguished Service Medal (DSM) ===
DSM ribbon

Army

- Captain M – For distinguished leadership in warlike operations as the Special Forces Advisory Team Commander, within Special Operations Task Group 632, Operation OKRA.
- Lieutenant Colonel Matthew Troy Smith – For distinguished leadership in warlike operations as Commanding Officer Training Task Unit, Task Group Taji VIII in Iraq from December 2018 to July 2019.

=== Commendation for Distinguished Service ===
Commendation for Distinguished Service ribbon

Army

- Corporal C – For distinguished performance of duties in warlike operations as the Fusion Analysis Support Cell Manager Intelligence Operations while deployed with the Special Operations Task Group 632 during Operation OKRA from December 2018 to June 2019.
- Lieutenant Colonel Mark Alexander Gilchrist – For distinguished performance of duties in warlike operations as the Chief of Intelligence Plans, Headquarters RESOLUTE SUPPORT, while force assigned to Operation HIGHROAD, from July 2018 to May 2019.
- Colonel Jason Stuart Groat CSC, DSM – For distinguished performance of duties in warlike operations as the Commander Task Group Taji VIII on Operation OKRA in Iraq from November 2018 to June 2019.
- Warrant Officer Class Two M – For distinguished performance of duties in warlike operations as the senior Sergeant within the Special Forces Advisory Team during Operation OKRA.
- Lieutenant Colonel Andrew Kenneth Treble – For distinguished performance of duties in warlike operations as the Chief of Future Operations for Train Advise Assist Command, South, Operation HIGHROAD from October 2018 to July 2019.

Air Force

- Squadron Leader Richard Michael Letts – For distinguished performance of duties in warlike operations as the Combined Joint Operations Centre, Train Advise Assist Command – Air Liaison Officer from September 2018 to March 2019 while deployed on Operation HIGHROAD.

=== Bar to the Conspicuous Service Cross (CSC and Bar) ===
CSC & Bar ribbon

Army

- Colonel Bede Thomas Galvin CSC – For outstanding achievement in the design and execution of Army and Australian Defence Force collective training.

Air Force

- Air Commodore Jennifer Karen Lumsden CSC – For outstanding achievement in Specialist Reserve health services for the Australian Defence Force.

=== Conspicuous Service Cross (CSC) ===
CSC ribbon

Navy

- Warrant Officer Raymond John Beasy OAM, CSM – For outstanding devotion to duty in the field of Navy gunnery and force protection training.
- Chief Petty Officer Luke Ray Brewer – For outstanding devotion to duty as the Chief Petty Officer Fire Command and Control and Sensors Supervisor in HMAS Hobart.
- Commander Richard Eric Brickacek DSM, RAN – For outstanding achievement as Commanding Officer HMAS Gascoyne.
- Commander Barry John Carmichael RAN – For outstanding achievement as Commanding Officer HMAS Farncomb from April to June 2018.
- Captain Paul Andrew Johnson DSM, RAN – For outstanding achievement as Commanding Officer HMAS Ballarat on Operation MANITOU from November 2018 and June 2019.
- Commander Casey Jayne Scully-O'Shea RAN – For outstanding achievement in the field of Defence Force Recruiting.

Army

- Corporal A – For outstanding devotion to duty as a Special Operations Command Liaison Officer.
- Colonel Mark Edward Baldock – For outstanding achievement as Director Logistics, Headquarters Forces Command.
- Lieutenant Colonel James Lachlan Bryant – For outstanding achievement as the Recruiting Liaison Officer – Army.
- Lieutenant Colonel Phillip Ellsmore – For outstanding achievement modernising and streamlining Army capabilities in digital communications and career management.
- Lieutenant Colonel Stephen Andrew Jenkins DSM – For outstanding achievement in the provision of non-lethal effects, joint fires and effects coordination capabilities within the Australian Defence Force.
- Lieutenant Colonel Caroline Lee Kelly CSM – For outstanding devotion to duty as Staff Officer Grade Two Diversity and Inclusion, Army People Capability Branch.
- Lieutenant Colonel Clare Louise O'Niell – For outstanding achievement in the field of Professional Military Education and strategic engagement.
- Lieutenant Colonel Neil Graham Peake – For outstanding achievement as the Commanding Officer of the 10th Force Support Battalion.
- The late Colonel Robert Andrew Sanders – For outstanding devotion to duty and achievement as Director Land, Army Headquarters
- Lieutenant Colonel Richard Nimitra Thapthimthong – For outstanding achievement as the Brigade Major of the 7th Combat Brigade.
- Lieutenant Colonel Ruth Janine Weir – For outstanding achievement as the Current Plans Operations Officer at Headquarters 1st Division and Deployable Joint Force Headquarters during the period 2018 to 2019.
- Colonel Mark Christopher Welburn – For outstanding achievement as the Chief of Staff of the 2nd Division.

Air Force

- Wing Commander Wayne Robert Bradley – For outstanding achievement in the recruitment and retention of Aboriginals and Torres Strait Islanders in the Royal Australian Air Force.
- Squadron Leader David William Bywater – For outstanding achievement in aeronautical life support equipment regulatory reform, rapid acquisition, and organisational development for the Australian Defence Force.
- Group Captain Paul Francis Deighton – For outstanding achievement in language training reform, development and delivery as Commanding Officer of the Defence Force School of Languages.
- Flight Sergeant Stewart Hume Hassall – For outstanding achievement in P 8A Poseidon maritime patrol aircraft maintenance and in the development of technical personnel at Number 11 Squadron, Royal Australian Air Force.
- Air Vice-Marshal Vincent Joseph Iervasi AM – For outstanding achievement as the Commander Joint Task Force 633 on Operations OKRA and HIGHROAD from January to June 2019.
- Squadron Leader Jasper John Downey McCaldin – For outstanding achievement in the creation of integrated tactical procedures to maximise air combat effectiveness for the Royal Australian Air Force.
- Corporal Tobias Benjamin O'Niell – For outstanding achievement in cyber warfare at Number 462 Squadron, Royal Australian Air Force.

=== Conspicuous Service Medal (CSM) ===
CSM ribbon

Navy

- Petty Officer Jonathon Richard Booth – For meritorious devotion to duty in Navy technical and leadership positions at sea and ashore.
- Lieutenant Commander Amy Cecilia Bulters RAN – For meritorious achievement in the field of NavyMeteorological and Oceanographic operational support.
- Chief Petty Officer Noel Michael Rex Christoffel – For meritorious achievement in whole-ship leadership and performance of duty as a senior sailor in HMAS Harman from January 2017 to June 2019.
- Lieutenant Commander Matthew Robert Eglen RAN – For meritorious devotion to duty in the field of Marine Engineering during the retirement of the Adelaide Class Frigates and introduction of the Hobart Class Destroyers.
- Commander Patricia Jane Kemp RAN – For meritorious achievement in the field of Navy Health Services.
- Chief Petty Officer Nicolle Renee Palmer – For meritorious achievement in the field of Minor War Vessel Communications and Information Systems.
- Leading Seaman Patrick Georgen Palmer – For meritorious achievement of duty in the field of Navy information and communications technology.
- Commander David Andrew Rendell RAN – For meritorious achievement in the field of information technology specifically the implementation of robotic process automation.
- Lieutenant Commander Siobhan Ann Sturdy RAN – For meritorious achievement as the Marine Engineering Officer in HMAS Sheean.
- Leading Seaman Imogen Kate Vincent – For meritorious achievement as the Boatswains Mate Assistant Workgroup Manager at the Directorate of Naval Workforce Management.

Army

- Lance Corporal A – For meritorious achievement in developing Information Warfare capability.
- Sergeant B – For meritorious devotion to duty as a Special Operations Advisor.
- Warrant Officer Class Two Shane Paul Cox – For meritorious achievement as an Indigenous Recruiting Specialist within Defence Force Recruiting.
- Lieutenant Colonel Andrew James Deacon – For meritorious devotion to duty as deputy director of the Defence Response Unit.
- Corporal Vikrant Vijayrao Deokar – For meritorious devotion to duty as an Information System Detachment Commander within 511 Signal Troop, 1st Signal Regiment during the period 2018 to 2019.
- Major Leonora Mary Dunn – For meritorious achievement as Staff Officer Grade Two Indigenous Projects – Army People Capability Branch.
- Captain Lachlan David Joseph – For meritorious achievement as the Current Operations Officer at Headquarters 3rd Brigade.
- Major Paul Anthony Lambert – For meritorious achievement as the Officer Commanding, 138 Signal Squadron.
- Sergeant Dale Mackenzie MacAskill – For meritorious achievement championing the Army Combatives Program within the Australian Army.
- Corporal N – For meritorious achievement in developing and implementing counter terrorism capability Lieutenant Colonel Benjamin David SHAW For meritorious achievement as the Principal Logistics Staff Officer at Headquarters Joint Task Force 633 in the Middle East from September 2018 to July 2019.
- Captain Kieran Shaw – For meritorious devotion to duty in the development of Joint Special Effects and Capabilities within the Australian Defence Force.
- Captain Christopher David Simpson – For meritorious achievement as an instructor at the Defence Force School of Intelligence.
- Chaplain Damian Hugh Styles – For meritorious devotion to duty as the Coordinating Chaplain of the 1st Brigade.
- Lieutenant Colonel Timothy Patrick Warner DSM – For meritorious achievement as the Staff Officer Grade One, Individual Training, of the Headquarters 2nd Division.

Air Force

- Group Captain Matthew Charles Barnett – For meritorious achievement as a Joint Operations Command domestic and Counter Terrorism Planning team leader.
- Wing Commander Julie Helen Canterbury – For meritorious achievement in project management of upgrades to the C-130J Hercules air transport capability for the Australian Defence Force.
- Group Captain Paul Copeland Carpenter – For meritorious achievement in joint air operations planning and force generation of command and control personnel for the Royal Australian Air Force.
- Squadron Leader Lisa June Hubbard – For meritorious achievement in logistic support of the C-27J Spartan battlefield airlifter capability.
- Wing Commander Andrew James Miller – For meritorious achievement in intelligence capability development as the inaugural Commanding Officer of the Air Intelligence Training Unit, Royal Australian Air Force.
- Corporal Daniel-Scott William Zaniol – For meritorious achievement in the maintenance and development of specialised electronic test equipment in support of the Australian Defence Force's air combat electronic warfare capability.
