= General Smart =

General Smart may refer to:

- Edward Smart (1891–1961), Australian Army lieutenant general
- Jacob E. Smart (1909–2006), U.S. Army general
- Tracy Smart (fl. 1980s–2010s), Royal Australian Air Force Surgeon General
