= Army (newspaper) =

Newspaper published for the Australian Army

- The front page of Army
- Type: monthly newspaper
- Format: Tabloid
- Owner: Department of Defence
- Headquarters: Russell Offices, Canberra, ACT, Australia
- ISSN: 0729-5685 (print); 2209-2218 (web)
- Website: Army newspaper

Army is the newspaper published by the Australian Army. The paper is produced monthly and is uploaded online so that members can access it when deployed overseas. Originally, it was published fortnightly and was converted to a monthly publication in July 2026.

== See also ==
- Navy News (Australia)
- Air Force (newspaper)
- Yarning: The language and culture magazine
- Table Tops, a free daily newspaper produced for Australian Army personnel during WWII, with regional editions produced abroad, for serving personnel
