= Mandjelia rejae =

Scientific classification
- Kingdom: Animalia
- Phylum: Arthropoda
- Subphylum: Chelicerata
- Class: Arachnida
- Order: Araneae
- Infraorder: Mygalomorphae
- Family: Barychelidae
- Genus: Mandjelia
- Species: M. rejae

Binomial name
- Mandjelia rejae Raven & Churchill, 1994

Species of spider

Mandjelia rejae is a species of mygalomorph spider in the Barychelidae family. It is endemic to Australia. It was described in 1994 by Australian arachnologists Robert Raven and Tracey Churchill. The specific epithet rejae honours Professor Rhondda Elizabeth Jones of James Cook University for her encouragement of, and support for, the junior author.

== Distribution and habitat ==
The species occurs in coastal North Queensland in rainforest habitats. The type locality is Mount Halifax, 60 km north of Townsville, in the Paluma Range National Park.
