= Yarning (magazine) =

Language and culture magazine

Yarning: The language and culture magazine
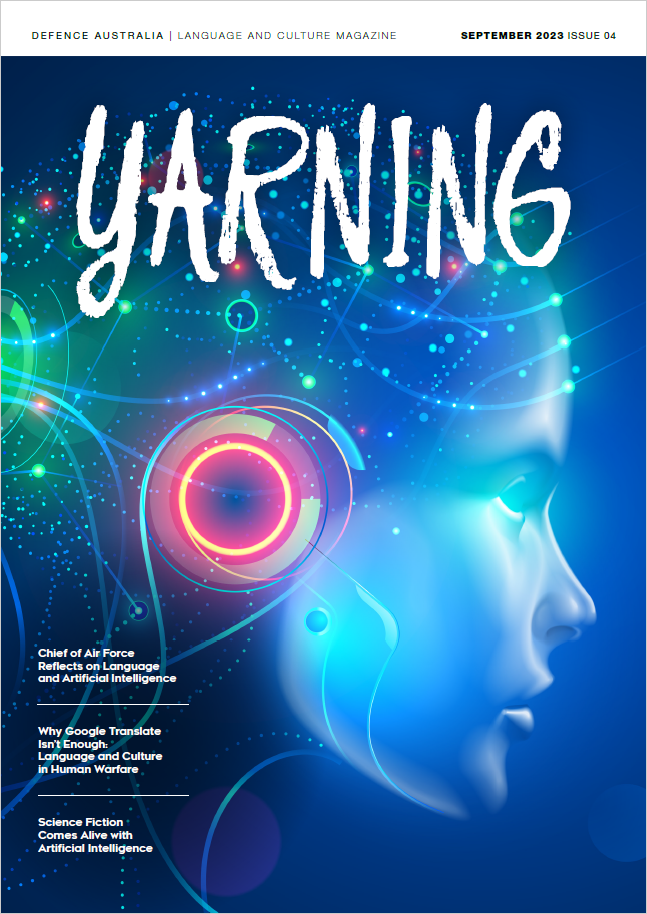
- The September 2023 front cover of Yarning
- Type: Quarterly magazine
- Founder: Paul Thomson
- Publisher: Department of Defence
- Editor-in-chief: Paul Thomson
- Managing editor: Stephanie Evans
- Staff writers: Leah Henderson, Nicolette Shallvey, Natalie Omond
- Founded: 21 July 2022; 3 years ago
- Headquarters: Canberra, ACT, Australia
- Country: Australia (published internationally)
- ISSN: 2653-8423 (print); 2653-8024 (web)
- Website: Yarning magazine

Yarning: The language and culture magazine, (formerly Defence Linguist Magazine) is an international quarterly magazine, published by the Australian Department of Defence. The feature editions focus on language, linguistic experiences, and the intersections of culture and communication.

In June 2023, the magazine received an endorsement from J. Angelo Berbotto the President of the Australian Institute of Interpreters and Translators. Notable contributors to the magazine have included Australian award-winning actor, Jack Thompson, AM, and the Australian Chief of the Defence Force, General Angus Campbell, AO, DSC.

In October 2023, Chief of Personnel, Lieutenant General Natasha Fox, AO, CSC, signed on as the publications official Patron.

== History ==
The magazine was founded by Paul Thomson in July 2022. Originally titled Defence Linguist Magazine, the name was changed to its current name after running a competition in the first edition.

The term 'yarning' is an Australian English word used to describe the sharing of knowledge and stories in a culturally respectful way with a view to building relationships.

== See also ==
- Air Force (newspaper)
- Army (newspaper)
- Navy News (Australia)
