= Mandjelia platnicki =

Scientific classification
- Kingdom: Animalia
- Phylum: Arthropoda
- Subphylum: Chelicerata
- Class: Arachnida
- Order: Araneae
- Infraorder: Mygalomorphae
- Family: Barychelidae
- Genus: Mandjelia
- Species: M. platnicki

Binomial name
- Mandjelia platnicki Raven, 1994

Species of spider

Mandjelia platnicki is a species of mygalomorph spider in the Barychelidae family. It is endemic to New Caledonia. It was described in 1994 by Australian arachnologist Robert Raven. The specific epithet platnicki honours Dr Norman I. Platnick, Chairman of the Entomology Department at the American Museum of Natural History, for his contributions to arachnology.

== Distribution and habitat ==
The species occurs in New Caledonia in montane rainforest. The type locality is Mount Mandjélia, near the north-western end of the main island of Grande Terre.
