= Mandjelia =

Scientific classification
- Kingdom: Animalia
- Phylum: Arthropoda
- Subphylum: Chelicerata
- Class: Arachnida
- Order: Araneae
- Infraorder: Mygalomorphae
- Family: Barychelidae
- Genus: Mandjelia; Raven, 1994

Type species
- M. brassi Raven & Churchill, 1994

Species
- 23, see text

Genus of spiders

Mandjelia is a genus of South Pacific brushed trapdoor spiders first described by Robert Raven in 1994.

== Species ==
As of April 2019 the genus contained twenty-three species, from Queensland (QLD), Western Australia (WA) and the Northern Territory (NT) in Australia, as well as one species from New Caledonia (NC):

- Mandjelia anzses Raven & Churchill, 1994 – QLD
- Mandjelia banksi Raven & Churchill, 1994 – QLD
- Mandjelia brassi Raven & Churchill, 1994 (type) – QLD
- Mandjelia colemani Raven & Churchill, 1994 – QLD
- Mandjelia commoni Raven & Churchill, 1994 – QLD
- Mandjelia exasperans Raven & Churchill, 1994 – QLD
- Mandjelia fleckeri Raven & Churchill, 1994 – QLD
- Mandjelia galmarra Raven & Churchill, 1994 – QLD
- Mandjelia humphreysi Raven & Churchill, 1994 – WA
- Mandjelia iwupataka Raven & Churchill, 1994 – NT
- Mandjelia macgregori Raven & Churchill, 1994 – QLD
- Mandjelia madura Raven & Churchill, 1994 – WA
- Mandjelia mccrackeni Raven & Churchill, 1994 – QLD
- Mandjelia nuganuga Raven & Churchill, 1994 – QLD
- Mandjelia oenpelli Raven & Churchill, 1994 – NT
- Mandjelia paluma Raven & Churchill, 1994 – QLD
- Mandjelia platnicki Raven, 1994 – NC
- Mandjelia qantas Raven & Churchill, 1994 – QLD
- Mandjelia rejae Raven & Churchill, 1994 – QLD
- Mandjelia thorelli (Raven, 1990) – QLD
- Mandjelia wooroonooran Raven & Churchill, 1994 – QLD
- Mandjelia wyandotte Raven & Churchill, 1994 – QLD
- Mandjelia yuccabine Raven & Churchill, 1994 – QLD
