= Mandjelia colemani =

Scientific classification
- Kingdom: Animalia
- Phylum: Arthropoda
- Subphylum: Chelicerata
- Class: Arachnida
- Order: Araneae
- Infraorder: Mygalomorphae
- Family: Barychelidae
- Genus: Mandjelia
- Species: M. colemani

Binomial name
- Mandjelia colemani Raven & Churchill, 1994

Species of spider

Mandjelia colemani is a species of mygalomorph spider in the Barychelidae family. It is endemic to Australia. It was described in 1994 by Australian arachnologists Robert Raven and Tracey Churchill. The specific epithet colemani honours North Queensland naturalist N. Clyde Coleman, who collected locally.

== Distribution and habitat ==
The species occurs in Far North Queensland. The type locality is Davies Creek National Park, 20 km south-west of Cairns, on the Atherton Tableland.
