= Mandjelia madura =

Scientific classification
- Kingdom: Animalia
- Phylum: Arthropoda
- Subphylum: Chelicerata
- Class: Arachnida
- Order: Araneae
- Infraorder: Mygalomorphae
- Family: Barychelidae
- Genus: Mandjelia
- Species: M. madura

Binomial name
- Mandjelia madura Raven & Churchill, 1994

Species of spider

Mandjelia madura is a species of mygalomorph spider in the Barychelidae family. It is endemic to Australia. It was described in 1994 by Australian arachnologists Robert Raven and Tracey Churchill. The specific epithet madura refers to the type locality.

== Distribution and habitat ==
The species occurs in south-east Western Australia. The type locality is about 50 km east of Madura.
