= Mandjelia thorelli =

Scientific classification
- Kingdom: Animalia
- Phylum: Arthropoda
- Subphylum: Chelicerata
- Class: Arachnida
- Order: Araneae
- Infraorder: Mygalomorphae
- Family: Barychelidae
- Genus: Mandjelia
- Species: M. thorelli

Binomial name
- Mandjelia thorelli (Raven, 1990)

Synonyms
- Trittame thorelli Raven, 1990

Species of spider

Mandjelia thorelli is a species of mygalomorph spider in the Barychelidae family. It is endemic to Australia. It was described in 1990 by Australian arachnologist Robert Raven.

== Distribution and habitat ==
The species occurs in North Queensland at Crediton, the Clarke Range and Finch Hatton in the Eungella region.
