= Mandjelia fleckeri =

Scientific classification
- Kingdom: Animalia
- Phylum: Arthropoda
- Subphylum: Chelicerata
- Class: Arachnida
- Order: Araneae
- Infraorder: Mygalomorphae
- Family: Barychelidae
- Genus: Mandjelia
- Species: M. fleckeri

Binomial name
- Mandjelia fleckeri Raven & Churchill, 1994

Species of spider

Mandjelia fleckeri is a species of mygalomorph spider in the Barychelidae family. It is endemic to Australia. It was described in 1994 by Australian arachnologists Robert Raven and Tracey Churchill. The specific epithet fleckeri honours medical doctor and naturalist Hugo Flecker.

== Distribution and habitat ==
The species occurs in North Queensland in open forest habitats. The type locality is Mount Cleveland, on Cape Cleveland, just south of Townsville.
