= Robyn Walker =

Robyn Margaret Walker
- Born: 1 July 1959 (age 67); Allora, Queensland
- Military career
- Allegiance: Australia
- Branch: Royal Australian Navy
- Service years: 1991–2016
- Rank: Rear Admiral
- Commands: Commander Joint Health (2011–15)
- Awards: Member of the Order of Australia

Rear Admiral Robyn Margaret Walker AM (born 1 July 1959) is an Australian medical practitioner and a retired senior officer of the Royal Australian Navy (RAN). Walker became the first female admiral in the RAN when she was appointed Surgeon-General of the Australian Defence Force on 16 December 2011.

As Surgeon-General, Walker commanded the Joint Health Command until her retirement in December 2015. Air Vice Marshal Tracy Smart was appointed as her successor as Joint Health Commander.

== Notes ==
Military offices
Preceded by Major General Paul Alexander	Commander Joint Health Command; 2011–2015	Succeeded by Air Vice Marshal Tracy Smart
