= Joint Health Command (Australia) =

- Country: Australia
- Branch: Australian Defence Force Chief of Personnel
- Role: Military health
- Garrison/HQ: Campbell Park Offices, Canberra

Commanders
- Current commander: Rear Admiral Sonya Bennett
- Abbreviation: JHC

The Joint Health Command (JHC) is responsible for the delivery of military medicine and joint healthcare services to Australian Defence Force (ADF) personnel, including military psychiatry and rehabilitation services. The JHC is also responsible for providing strategic health policy, the development of the health preparedness of ADF personnel for operations, and the coordination of health units for deployment in support of operations. JHC is led by the dual-hatted Commander Joint Health and Surgeon General of the ADF.

The Commander Joint Health is responsible to the Chief of Personnel while deployed health units are responsible to the Chief of Joint Operations. The JHC is staffed by ADF active and reserve personnel, Department of Defence public servants, and contracted health professionals.

== History ==
=== Pacific Partnership ===
The Joint Health Command has contributed personnel to the United States Pacific Fleet's Pacific Partnership, a humanitarian assistance initiative, since 2005.

In 2010, 25 personnel of the Joint Health Command, supported by HMAS Labuan and HMAS Tarakan acting as forward operating platform for remote medical and dental clinics, deployed to North Maluku and assisted in medical treatment for over 5000 patients and 150 surgeries onboard USNS Mercy.

=== AUSMTF Uruzgan ===
In 2008, the health personnel from the Australian Army and the Royal Australian Air Force provided two rotations of 10 surgical and intensive care personnel in support of the Dutch Role 2 (Enhanced) Medical Treatment Facility (MTF) also called the Uruzgan Medical Centre located in Kamp Holland within Multi National Base Tarin Kot in Tarin Kowt, the capital of the southern Uruzgan province known as AUSMTF teams.

== Role ==
Joint Health Command (JHC) provides health care to ADF members and ensures the health preparedness of ADF personnel for operations, and, deployable elements of JHC for deployment in support of operations. To effect this, JHC develops strategic health policy, provides strategic level health advice and exercises technical and financial control of ADF health units.

== Structure ==
The JHC is staffed by medical, dental and allied health professionals. These staff may also provide garrison health services to ADF members while they are not on deployment. A total of 1699 health practitioners work in garrison health services comprising 403 public servants, 510 defence personnel, and 786 contractors working on a sessional basis. The Joint Health Command is made up of the:

- Garrison Health Operations Branch which is responsible for the delivery and management of healthcare to ADF personnel within Australia and on non-operational postings overseas.
- Mental Health, Psychology and Rehabilitation Branch which provides mental health support across occupational psychology, rehabilitation services, and mental health clinical programs.
- Health Capability Branch which oversees health resources and logistics, pharmacy, workforce development and training, and strategic health capabilities.
- Strategic Health Coordination Branch which oversees family health, health and medical research, and eHealth data and information management.
- Chair of Military Surgery and Medicine is a professional position held jointly at the University of Queensland, the Royal Brisbane and Women's Hospital and the Department of Defence to lead a research program in trauma medicine and surgery relevant to the Australian Defence Force.

== Regional Health Services ==
The JHC's delivery of garrison health services is via a regional structure for medical facilities through Regional Health Services (RHS) that provide the basis for healthcare administration. JHC manages 104 garrison health facilities.

Central New South Wales (JHU-CNSW)

- Albatross Health Centre
- HMAS Creswell
- Holsworthy Health Centre
- Kuttabul Health Centre
- Randwick Health Centre
- Tobruk Clinic
- Victoria Barracks Clinic Sydney
- Watson Clinic

Southern NSW ACT (JHU-SNSW)

- Butterworth Clinic
- Duntroon Clinic
- Duntroon Health Centre
- Harman Clinic
- Kapooka Health Centre
- Kapooka Clinic
- Russell Health Centre
- Weston Clinic
- Wagga Health

Victoria and Tasmania (JHU-VICTAS)

- Albury Wodonga Health Centre
- Anglesea Clinic
- Cerberus Health Clinic
- East Sale Health Clinic
- Laverton Clinic
- Puckapunyal Health Centre
- Simpson Health Centre
- Victoria Barracks Clinic Melbourne

Western Australia and South Australia (JHU-WASA)

- Campbell Health Centre
- Edinburgh Health Centre
- Keswick Clinic
- Leeuwin Health Centre
- Pearce Health Centre
- Stirling Health Centre
- Stirling SUMU Clinic
- Taylor Clinic
- Woodside Clinic

Northern Territory (JHU-NT)

- Darwin Health Centre
- Larrakeyah Health Centre
- Robertson Health Centre
- Tindal Health Centre

Northern Queensland (JHU-NQ)

- Cairns Health Centre
- Lavarack Health Centre
- Lavarack East Clinic
- Porton Clinic
- Townsville Health Centre
- Tully Clinic

South Queensland (JHU-SQ)

- Amberley Health Centre
- Canungra Clinic
- Cabarlah Clinic
- Enoggera Clinic
- Enoggera Clinic East
- Enoggera Health Centre
- Oakey Health Centre

Northern New South Wales (JHU-NNSW)

- Glenbrook Clinic
- Penguin Health Centre
- Penguin SUMU Clinic
- Richmond Health Centre
- Singleton Health Centre
- Tamworth Clinic
- Waterhen Clinic
- Williamtown Health Centre

== Surgeons-General ==
Rank	Name	Postnominals	Service	Term began	Term ended
Major General	Colin Gurner	AO, CBE, ED	Army	1977	1979
Major General	William Rodgers	AO, OBE	Army	1985	1990
Air Vice Marshal	Michael Miller	AO	RAAF	1990	1992
Major General	David Rossi	AO	Army	1992	1996
Air Vice Marshal	Graeme Moller	AM	RAAF	1996	1998
Major General	John Pearn	AM, RFD	Army	1998	2001
Air Vice Marshal	Bruce Short	AM	RAAF	2001	2005
Rear Admiral	Graeme Shirtley		RAN	2005	2008
Major General	Paul Alexander	AO	Army	2008	2011
Rear Admiral	Robyn Walker	AM	RAN	2011	2015
Air Vice Marshal	Tracy Smart	AO	RAAF	2015	2019
Rear Admiral	Sarah Sharkey	AM, CSC	RAN	2019	2023
Rear Admiral	Sonya Bennett	AM	RAN	2023	

== See also ==
- Royal Australian Army Medical Corps
- RAAF Institute of Aviation Medicine
- Royal Australian Navy School of Underwater Medicine
- Australian Red Cross Blood Service
- Australian Army Medical Women's Service
- List of Australian hospital ships
