= Australian Institute of Interpreters and Translators =

The Australian Institute of Interpreters and Translators (AUSIT) is the professional association for translators and interpreters in Australia. The association is affiliated with the International Federation of Translators (FIT), and has a membership of over 1,200 interpreters and translators across Australia.

AUSIT produces a quarterly newsletter called In Touch, with the first edition being published in February 2002. The periodical is free to access and in 2022, the publication won the FIT Prize for best Periodical.

In June 2023, the AUSIT President, J. Angelo Berbotto, provided an endorsement for the Australian periodical, Yarning: The language and culture magazine.

== History ==
AUSIT was founded in 1987, when it brought together existing local associations and specialist groups in Australia. Today, AUSIT has branches in every state and territory of the country.

== See also ==
- National Accreditation Authority for Translators and Interpreters (NAATI)
