= Mandjelia wyandotte =

Scientific classification
- Kingdom: Animalia
- Phylum: Arthropoda
- Subphylum: Chelicerata
- Class: Arachnida
- Order: Araneae
- Infraorder: Mygalomorphae
- Family: Barychelidae
- Genus: Mandjelia
- Species: M. wyandotte

Binomial name
- Mandjelia wyandotte Raven & Churchill, 1994

Species of spider

Mandjelia wyandotte is a species of mygalomorph spider in the Barychelidae family. It is endemic to Australia. It was described in 1994 by Australian arachnologists Robert Raven and Tracey Churchill. The specific epithet wyandotte refers to the type locality.

== Distribution and habitat ==
The species occurs in Far North Queensland in open forest with grassland habitats. The type locality is Wyandotte Creek, between Mount Garnet and Charters Towers in the Tablelands Region.
