= Chief of Personnel (Australia) =

- Incumbent; Lieutenant General Natasha Fox since 5 June 2023
- Member of: Australian Defence Force
- Reports to: Chief of the Defence Force
- Inaugural holder: Lieutenant General Natasha Fox
- Formation: 5 June 2023

The Chief of Personnel (CPERS) is a three-star role within the Australian Defence Force (ADF), responsible for all members of the Australian Defence Force. The Minister of Defence, Richard Marles announced the creation of the new command following the Defence Strategic Review. The Chiefs main responsibility comes with the "distinct aim of increasing the effectiveness, efficiency and cohesiveness of personnel management to achieve a more integrated ADF".

== Chiefs of Personnel ==
Rank	Name	Postnominals	Term began	Term ended
Lieutenant General	Natasha Fox	AO, CSC	5 June 2023	Incumbent

== Structure ==
The Chief of Personnel is responsible for coordinating the various capabilities within the Australian Defence Force. Under the command of Chief of Personnel include the following commands.

=== Australian Defence College ===
The Australian Defence College (ADC) is responsible for the delivery of professional military education, command and staff education, and joint warfare training for the ADF. The ADC is the umbrella organisation for the Australian War College, Australian Civil-Military Centre, Australian War College, Australian Defence Force Academy. In 2019 the Australian War College formed from the merging of the Centre for Defence and Strategic Studies and the Australian Command and Staff College. The Commander of the Australian Defence College is Major General Mick Ryan.

The Australian Defence College is made up of the following units:

- Australian Defence Force Academy
- Australian Defence Force Training Centre
  - Australian Defence Force Peace Operations Training Centre
  - Australian Defence Force Warfare Training Centre
  - Defence Force School of Languages
  - Defence International Training Centre
  - Defence Languages Capability Cell
- Australian War College
- Centre for Defence Research
- Defence Learning Technologies Environment
- Wargaming and Simulation Centre

=== Joint Health Command ===
The Joint Health Command (JHC) is led by the Surgeon General of the Australian Defence Force, Rear Admiral Sarah Sharkey, and is responsible for the delivery of military medicine and joint healthcare services to ADF personnel, including military psychiatry and rehabilitation services. The JHC is also responsible for the development of the health preparedness of ADF personnel for operations and the coordination of health units for deployment in support of operations. JHC is responsible for these sections:

- Health Business and Plans
- Operational Health
- Garrison Health Operations
- Health Policy, Programs and Assurance

=== Recruitment and Retention Division ===
Recruiting and Retention Division was Initiated as the R2D2 Tiger Team established on 12 April 2022 to identify requirements and is now responsible for the design and delivery of ways to recruit, retain, grow and sustain an additional Australian Public Service and ADF workforce out to 2040.

=== Joint Support Services Division ===
Joint Support Services Division manages strategic policy as it relates to ADF Reserves and Cadets, manages ADF participation in conventional and adaptive sports, both domestically and internationally, and manages Defence’s responsibilities in the Australian National Action Plan for Women, Peace and Security.

== See also ==
- Current senior Australian Defence Organisation personnel
- Minister for Defence Personnel
