= Mandjelia humphreysi =

Scientific classification
- Kingdom: Animalia
- Phylum: Arthropoda
- Subphylum: Chelicerata
- Class: Arachnida
- Order: Araneae
- Infraorder: Mygalomorphae
- Family: Barychelidae
- Genus: Mandjelia
- Species: M. humphreysi

Binomial name
- Mandjelia humphreysi Raven & Churchill, 1994

Species of spider

Mandjelia humphreysi is a species of mygalomorph spider in the Barychelidae family. It is endemic to Australia. It was described in 1994 by Australian arachnologists Robert Raven and Tracey Churchill. The specific epithet humphreysi honours Dr Bill Humphreys, Curator of Ecology and Biogeography at the Western Australian Museum, for his contributions to arachnology in Western Australia.

== Distribution and habitat ==
The species occurs in south-east Western Australia in gimlet woodland. The type locality is Woodline, near Kalgoorlie.
