= Mandjelia qantas =

Scientific classification
- Kingdom: Animalia
- Phylum: Arthropoda
- Subphylum: Chelicerata
- Class: Arachnida
- Order: Araneae
- Infraorder: Mygalomorphae
- Family: Barychelidae
- Genus: Mandjelia
- Species: M. qantas

Binomial name
- Mandjelia qantas Raven & Churchill, 1994

Species of spider

Mandjelia qantas is a species of mygalomorph spider in the Barychelidae family. It is endemic to Australia. It was described in 1994 by Australian arachnologists Robert Raven and Tracey Churchill. The specific epithet qantas acknowledges support from Qantas Airways Ltd to the XII International Congress of Arachnology, Brisbane, 1992.

== Distribution and habitat ==
The species occurs in coastal Central Queensland in rainforest and vine thicket habitats. The type locality is near the entrance to the Olsen's Caves complex, 23 km north of Rockhampton.
