= Air Force (newspaper) =

Newspaper published by the Australian Department of Defence

- The front page of Air Force
- Type: monthly newspaper
- Format: Tabloid
- Owner: Department of Defence
- Headquarters: Russell Offices, Canberra, ACT, Australia
- ISSN: 1329-8909 (print); 2209-2234 (web)
- Website: Air Force newspaper

Air Force is the newspaper published by the Royal Australian Air Force. The paper is produced monthly and is uploaded online so that members can access it when deployed overseas. Originally, it was published fortnightly and was converted to a monthly publication in July 2026.

== See also ==
- Navy News (Australia)
- Army (newspaper)
- Yarning: The language and culture magazine
