= Pat Fennell =

Australian rural advocate

- Born: 1933; Charleville, Queensland, Australia
- Occupations: Grazier (retired); Real estate agent (retired); Rural advocate
- Known for: Advocating for better rural health services for women

Patricia June Fennell OAM (born 1933) is an Australian rural advocate.

Throughout her career, Fennell held many roles with various organisations, particularly those pertaining to rural women's health.

== Career ==
Fennell has served as a member of the Women's Council for Rural and Regional Women, as a board member of the North Queensland Rural Division of General Practice, and as a member of the National Health Council.

She helped establish the Centre for Rural and Remote Health in Mount Isa and is also credited with helping establish a Diploma of Enrolled Nursing Program in Mount Isa.

Fennell has also been active in the agricultural sector. She was the first woman to be elected onto the board of the Cattleman's Union of Australia. She later admitted this was a role she didn't particularly enjoy, stating in 2020: "I didn't stay with them very long, I went down for Melbourne for meetings but it was a different kind of committee then what I wanted to be on... There were a lot of very wealthy and great guys on it but they had a different perspective than where I was coming from, which was a big area and hard to run properties, lots of problems with distance and communications whereas in Melbourne, without being rude, they were fairly spoilt".

Fennell also served as the president of the union's Mount Isa branch, a role she said she enjoyed more because of being able to better relate to the Queensland graziers who she described as "real people". She has also served as president of Mount Isa's Landcare group.

Fennell is credited with establishing the live cattle trade with Indonesia and the Philippines.

== Personal life ==
Born in the South West Queensland town of Charleville in 1933 where she was raised, Fennell moved further north following the end of her first marriage. She had originally married another man when she was 18 but it quickly ended in divorce and she became a single mother aged in her early 20's.

Fennell said the stigma attached to having a broken marriage affected her but was determined to get over it and "make a fresh start". She eloped and married her childhood friend Mark Fennell in a small ceremony in Blackall in 1959 after which they moved to a remote property called "Linda Downs" near the Northern Territory border.

Over a period of 38 years, the couple bought and sold eleven properties before moving to Mount Isa when Fennell was aged 64 where for a time the couple owned the local Ray White Real Estate agency.

Fennell and her husband celebrated their 55th wedding anniversary in September 2014.

Fennell's granddaughter Gillian Fennell is a South Australian cattle producer who has served as a director for the Cattle Council of Australia and as a representative of Livestock South Australia.

In 2014, Fennell authored the book, What You Can Do with Twenty Quid.

The Fennell's attempted to retire to the coast when they relocated to Bundaberg in 2016 but they returned to Mount Isa in early 2020 where they have stayed.

== Awards ==
For her service to rural communities and rural women's issues, Fennell was awarded the Centenary Medal in 2001.

In 2015, she was named as a Queensland Great.

Fennell was awarded the Medal of the Order of Australia in the 2020 Queen's Birthday Honours in recognition of her service to women's health in rural and remote Queensland.
