= Mandjelia oenpelli =

Scientific classification
- Kingdom: Animalia
- Phylum: Arthropoda
- Subphylum: Chelicerata
- Class: Arachnida
- Order: Araneae
- Infraorder: Mygalomorphae
- Family: Barychelidae
- Genus: Mandjelia
- Species: M. oenpelli

Binomial name
- Mandjelia oenpelli Raven & Churchill, 1994

Species of spider

Mandjelia oenpelli is a species of mygalomorph spider in the Barychelidae family. It is endemic to Australia. It was described in 1994 by Australian arachnologists Robert Raven and Tracey Churchill. The specific epithet oenpelli refers to the type locality.

== Distribution and habitat ==
The species occurs in the Top End of the Northern Territory in Allosyncarpia forest habitats. The type locality is Oenpelli in west Arnhem Land.
