= Mandjelia nuganuga =

Scientific classification
- Kingdom: Animalia
- Phylum: Arthropoda
- Subphylum: Chelicerata
- Class: Arachnida
- Order: Araneae
- Infraorder: Mygalomorphae
- Family: Barychelidae
- Genus: Mandjelia
- Species: M. nuganuga

Binomial name
- Mandjelia nuganuga Raven & Churchill, 1994

Species of spider

Mandjelia nuganuga is a species of mygalomorph spider in the Barychelidae family. It is endemic to Australia. It was described in 1994 by Australian arachnologists Robert Raven and Tracey Churchill. The specific epithet nuganuga refers to the type locality.

== Distribution and habitat ==
The species occurs in Central Queensland. The type locality is Lake Nuga Nuga in the Central Highlands region.
