= Mandjelia galmarra =

Scientific classification
- Kingdom: Animalia
- Phylum: Arthropoda
- Subphylum: Chelicerata
- Class: Arachnida
- Order: Araneae
- Infraorder: Mygalomorphae
- Family: Barychelidae
- Genus: Mandjelia
- Species: M. galmarra

Binomial name
- Mandjelia galmarra Raven & Churchill, 1994

Species of spider

Mandjelia galmarra is a species of mygalomorph spider in the Barychelidae family. It is endemic to Australia. It was described in 1994 by Australian arachnologists Robert Raven and Tracey Churchill. The specific epithet galmarra honours Galmarra, Aboriginal guide to explorer Edmund Kennedy.

== Distribution and habitat ==
The species occurs in Far North Queensland. The type locality is Captain Billy Creek, in the Apudthama National Park on the northern Cape York Peninsula.
