= Natasha Fox =

Australian Army officer

- Military career
- Allegiance: Australia
- Branch: Australian Army
- Service years: 1988–present
- Rank: Lieutenant General
- Unit: Royal Australian Army Ordnance Corps
- Commands: Chief of Personnel (2023–); Deputy Chief of Army (2022–23); Head People Capability (2018–21)
- Conflicts: War in Afghanistan
- Awards: Officer of the Order of Australia; Conspicuous Service Cross

Lieutenant General Natasha Anne Fox, AO, CSC is a senior officer in the Australian Army. She joined the army via the Australian Defence Force Academy (ADFA) in 1988 and has spent much of her career in logistics and training roles. She served as Commanding Officer/Chief Instructor at ADFA from 2009 to 2010, and deployed on operations to Israel, Syria and Lebanon and to Afghanistan. She was Head People Capability from November 2018 to December 2021, Deputy Chief of Army from February 2022 to June 2023, and was appointed the inaugural Chief of Personnel on 5 June 2023. She was both the first woman to serve as a deputy service chief and the first woman, and logistic officer (Royal Australian Corps of Transport, Royal Australian Electrical and Mechanical Engineers and the Royal Australian Army Ordnance Corps), to be promoted to three-star rank in the Australian Defence Force.

== Military career ==
Fox entered the Australian Defence Force Academy (ADFA) as an Australian Army officer cadet in 1988. She graduated with a Bachelor of Arts degree in 1990 and, following additional training at the Royal Military College, Duntroon, was commissioned an officer in 1991. Her early career included a series of logistics and training appointments, a period as aide-de-camp to the Chief of Army, and a posting to the Middle East as a military observer with the United Nations Truce Supervision Organization.

Fox was Commanding Officer/Chief Instructor at ADFA from 2009 to 2010. For her "outstanding achievement" in the role, Fox was awarded the Conspicuous Service Cross in the 2012 Australia Day Honours. She was next posted as Staff Officer Grade One Personnel Policy at Australian Army Headquarters and, in June 2012, deployed on Operation Slipper as chief of staff of Joint Task Force 633, the command responsible for all Australian forces in the Middle East Area of Operations. She returned to Australia in January 2013 as Director of Personnel Policy – Army. In the 2014 Australia Day Honours, Fox was appointed a Member of the Order of Australia for her "exceptional performance of duty" in the Middle East.

Fox was serving as Director General Workforce Planning Branch by 2016. In November 2018, she was appointed Head People Capability, with oversight for the recruitment and retention of personnel, the workforce structure of the Australian Defence Force (ADF), and the transition of personnel from service to civilian life. Fox handed over People Capability to Major General Wade Stothart in December 2021 and, on 2 February 2022, succeeded Major General Anthony Rawlins as Deputy Chief of Army. Fox was both the first woman to serve in the role and the first woman to be appointed a deputy service chief in the ADF. In announcing her appointment, the Minister for Defence Personnel, Darren Chester, said "Fox is leading the way for other women in the ADF" and acknowledged her "accomplishments and contribution to the nation".

Fox was promoted to lieutenant general and appointed the ADF's inaugural Chief of Personnel on 5 June 2023. Fox's role was created in response to the Defence Strategic Review 2023, which recommended that personnel management in the ADF be integrated and centralised under a single command to "increase [its] effectiveness, efficiency and cohesiveness". On assuming the appointment, Fox became the first woman to be promoted to three-star rank in the ADF. One week later, and as part of the 2023 King's Birthday Honours, Fox was promoted to Officer of the Order of Australia. The award recognised her "exceptional leadership in successive senior appointments", specifically in people capability and as Deputy Chief of the Army.

In October 2023, Fox became the inaugural Patron for Yarning: The language and culture magazine, a publication produced by the Department of Defence.

== Personal life ==
Fox is married to Commodore Andrew Willis, an officer in the Royal Australian Navy. They have two children.

In addition to her bachelor's degree, Fox holds a Master of Business Administration from the University of Southern Queensland, a Master of Management in Defence Studies from the University of Canberra, and a Master of Politics and Policy from Deakin University.

Military offices
Preceded by Major General Anthony Rawlins	Deputy Chief of Army; 2022–2023	Succeeded by Major General Cheryl Pearce
Preceded by Rear Admiral Brett Wolski	Head People Capability; 2018–2021	Succeeded by Major General Wade Stothart
