= Mandjelia yuccabine =

Scientific classification
- Kingdom: Animalia
- Phylum: Arthropoda
- Subphylum: Chelicerata
- Class: Arachnida
- Order: Araneae
- Infraorder: Mygalomorphae
- Family: Barychelidae
- Genus: Mandjelia
- Species: M. yuccabine

Binomial name
- Mandjelia yuccabine Raven & Churchill, 1994

Species of spider

Mandjelia yuccabine is a species of mygalomorph spider in the Barychelidae family. It is endemic to Australia. It was described in 1994 by Australian arachnologists Robert Raven and Tracey Churchill. The specific epithet yuccabine refers to the type locality.

== Distribution and habitat ==
The species occurs in Far North Queensland in rainforest habitats. The type locality is Yuccabine Creek in the Kirrama Range between Cairns and Townsville.
