= Mandjelia banksi =

Scientific classification
- Kingdom: Animalia
- Phylum: Arthropoda
- Subphylum: Chelicerata
- Class: Arachnida
- Order: Araneae
- Infraorder: Mygalomorphae
- Family: Barychelidae
- Genus: Mandjelia
- Species: M. banksi

Binomial name
- Mandjelia banksi Raven & Churchill, 1994

Species of spider

Mandjelia banksi is a species of mygalomorph spider in the Barychelidae family. It is endemic to Australia. It was described in 1994 by Australian arachnologists Robert Raven and Tracey Churchill. The specific epithet banksi honours British explorer and naturalist Sir Joseph Banks, who financed and sailed on the voyage of the Endeavour under James Cook from 1768 to 1771.

== Distribution and habitat ==
The species occurs in Far North Queensland. in low rainforest and open eucalypt forest. The type locality is Mount Cook National Park.
