= Herb Wharton =

Indigenous Australian stockman and writer (1936–2026)

Herbert Morsley Wharton AM (1936 – May 2026) was an Indigenous Australian stockman turned writer. He began publishing poetry and yarn-like novels in his fifties, for which he is now recognised internationally.

== Life and career ==
Herbert Morsley Wharton was born in Cunnamulla, Queensland in 1936. He was of the Murri people; his maternal grandmother was Kooma and both grandfathers Irish.

Wharton and his work have been recognised in a number of ways. In 2012, Wharton received the 'Australia Council Award for Lifetime Achievement in Literature': a $50,000 award for eminent writers who have made outstanding and lifelong contributions to Australian literature. In 2013, Wharton was a recipient of the Queensland Greats Awards. In the 2020 Queen's Birthday Honours, Wharton was made a Member of the Order of Australia (AM) for "significant service to the literary arts, to poetry, and to the Indigenous community".

The Fryer Library houses the Herb Wharton manuscript collection which contains working and completed drafts of writings, poetry (published and unpublished), correspondence, diaries, speeches, taped video and audio interviews, and miscellaneous notes.

Wharton died in May 2026.

== Works ==
Novels

- Unbranded (UQP, 1992) ISBN 0-7022-2444-8
- Yumba Days (UQP, 1999) ISBN 978-0-7022-3113-1

Short stories

- Cattle Camp: Murri Drovers and their Stories (UQP, 1994)
- Where Ya Been Mate? (1996)

Poetry

- Kings With Empty Pockets (2003) ISBN 978-0-9581883-4-0 Review
- Imba (Listen): Tell You a Story (2003) ISBN 0-9581883-3-5
