= Mandjelia anzses =

Scientific classification
- Kingdom: Animalia
- Phylum: Arthropoda
- Subphylum: Chelicerata
- Class: Arachnida
- Order: Araneae
- Infraorder: Mygalomorphae
- Family: Barychelidae
- Genus: Mandjelia
- Species: M. anzses

Binomial name
- Mandjelia anzses Raven & Churchill, 1994

Species of spider

Mandjelia anzses is a species of mygalomorph spider in the Barychelidae family. It is endemic to Australia. It was described in 1994 by Australian arachnologists Robert Raven and Tracey Churchill. The specific epithet anzes honours the participants in the expedition of the Australian and New Zealand Scientific Exploration Society (ANZSES).

== Distribution and habitat ==
The species occurs in north-east Queensland in rainforest habitats. The type locality is Mount Windsor, west of Mossman.
