= Mandjelia mccrackeni =

Scientific classification
- Kingdom: Animalia
- Phylum: Arthropoda
- Subphylum: Chelicerata
- Class: Arachnida
- Order: Araneae
- Infraorder: Mygalomorphae
- Family: Barychelidae
- Genus: Mandjelia
- Species: M. mccrackeni

Binomial name
- Mandjelia mccrackeni Raven & Churchill, 1994

Species of spider

Mandjelia mccrackeni is a species of mygalomorph spider in the Barychelidae family. It is endemic to Australia. It was described in 1994 by Australian arachnologists Robert Raven and Tracey Churchill. The specific epithet mccrackeni honours Charlie McCracken, local authority and guide in the Daintree area.

== Distribution and habitat ==
The species occurs in Far North Queensland in rainforest habitats. The type locality is Thornton Peak, just south of Cape Tribulation and 80 km north of Cairns.
