= Mandjelia macgregori =

Scientific classification
- Kingdom: Animalia
- Phylum: Arthropoda
- Subphylum: Chelicerata
- Class: Arachnida
- Order: Araneae
- Infraorder: Mygalomorphae
- Family: Barychelidae
- Genus: Mandjelia
- Species: M. macgregori

Binomial name
- Mandjelia macgregori Raven & Churchill, 1994

Species of spider

Mandjelia macgregori is a species of mygalomorph spider in the Barychelidae family. It is endemic to Australia. It was described in 1994 by Australian arachnologists Robert Raven and Tracey Churchill. The specific epithet macgregori honours Sir William MacGregor (1846–1919), a former Governor of Queensland.

== Distribution and habitat ==
The species occurs in North Queensland on cracking black soil plains with basalt ridges. The type locality is Bluff Downs Station, 60 km north-west of Charters Towers, on the Cape York Peninsula.
