= Mandjelia iwupataka =

Scientific classification
- Kingdom: Animalia
- Phylum: Arthropoda
- Subphylum: Chelicerata
- Class: Arachnida
- Order: Araneae
- Infraorder: Mygalomorphae
- Family: Barychelidae
- Genus: Mandjelia
- Species: M. iwupataka

Binomial name
- Mandjelia iwupataka Raven & Churchill, 1994

Species of spider

Mandjelia iwupataka is a species of mygalomorph spider in the Barychelidae family. It is endemic to Australia. It was described in 1994 by Australian arachnologists Robert Raven and Tracey Churchill. The specific epithet iwupataka refers to an outstation near the type locality.

== Distribution and habitat ==
The species occurs in the Northern Territory. The type locality is Standley Chasm, in the Tjoritja / West MacDonnell National Park, 40 km west of Alice Springs.
