= Mandjelia exasperans =

Scientific classification
- Kingdom: Animalia
- Phylum: Arthropoda
- Subphylum: Chelicerata
- Class: Arachnida
- Order: Araneae
- Infraorder: Mygalomorphae
- Family: Barychelidae
- Genus: Mandjelia
- Species: M. exasperans

Binomial name
- Mandjelia exasperans Raven & Churchill, 1994

Species of spider

Mandjelia exasperans is a species of mygalomorph spider in the Barychelidae family. It is endemic to Australia. It was described in 1994 by Australian arachnologists Robert Raven and Tracey Churchill. The specific epithet exasperans refers to the exasperation of the author when confronted with yet another new species to describe.

== Distribution and habitat ==
The species occurs in North Queensland in montane heath and open forest. The type locality is Mount Halifax, 60 km north of Townsville, in the Paluma Range National Park.
