= Navy News (Australia) =

Newspaper

Navy
- The front page of Navy News, 3 September 2009 edition
- Type: monthly newspaper
- Format: Tabloid
- Owner: Department of Defence
- Founded: 1958
- Headquarters: Russell Offices, Canberra, Australian Capital Territory
- ISSN: 2209-2277 (print); 2209-2242 (web)
- Website: Navy News

Navy News is the newspaper published by the Royal Australian Navy. The paper is produced monthly and is uploaded online so that members can access it when deployed overseas. The first edition was published in July 1958. Originally, it was published fortnightly and was converted to a monthly publication in July 2026.

== See also ==
- Army (newspaper)
- Air Force (newspaper)
- Yarning: The language and culture magazine
