= Elizabeth Joyce Smith =

Australian hymnist and Anglican priest

The Reverend Elizabeth Joyce Smith AM
- Born: 1956 (age 69–70); Stawell, Victoria, Australia
- Occupations: Anglican priest, hymnist
- Known for: Hymns

Ecclesiastical career
- Religion: Anglican
- Ordained: 1993

Elizabeth Joyce Smith AM (born 1956) is an Australian Anglican priest and hymnist.

== Biography ==
Elizabeth Joyce Smith was born in Stawell, Victoria, Australia in 1956. She attended secondary school in Euroa. From 1974 to 1978, she studied at Monash University in Melbourne, and at the University of Melbourne.

Smith earned a Bachelor of Divinity at the Trinity College Theological School in 1986, and was ordained a deacon the following year. From 1987 to 1989, she served as an assistant curate in St Eanswythe's, Altona, followed by two years as assistant curate at St Stephen's, Mount Waverley (1990-1991).

In 1992 women's ordination was approved within the Anglican Church of Australia. Smith was ordained a priest in June 1993.

Smith pursued liturgical studies at the Pacific School of Religion, California, where she obtained her PhD in 1995. Her thesis was published in 1999 as Bearing Fruit in Due Season: Feminist Hermeneutics and the Bible in Worship. She has been a member of the Societas Liturgica since 1995. Smith was appointed to the Liturgy Commission for the Anglican Church in Australia in 1997, becoming the Executive Secretary in 2011.

From 1995 to 2008, Smith served as the priest at St John's Church in Bentleigh, Victoria, and was area dean of Glen Eira from 1997 to 2000. In 2008, she moved to the Diocese of Perth to become Mission Plan Coordinator and Mission Development Coordinator (2008-2015).

Since 2015, Smith has been a mission priest in the Parish of the Goldfields. She also serves as the area dean and works part-time as a chaplain for the Amana Living Aged Care and School of Mines.

== Hymns ==
Smith is a feminist hymnologist who uses inclusive language and non-hierarchical images in her writing. She is quoted as saying that she tries "to be inclusive in [her] writing and preaching – of women, and of all the other people God loves but the church often overlooks or excludes."

Smith published her first collection, Praise the God of Grace, in 1990. She subsequently published two additional collections of hymns: Rejoice! For God Has Called Us, in 1993, and Songs for a Hopeful Church, in 1997.

Several of Smith's hymns are included in an ecumenical hymnal, Together in Song, which was published in Australia in 1999.

- "Where wide sky rolls down" - Hymn #188
- "Holy Spirit, go before us" - Hymn #420
- "Love will be our lenten calling" - Hymn #684 (copyright 1997)
- "God gives us a future" - Hymn #687
- "Faith will not grow from words alone" - Hymn #691

Two other hymns are included in other collections:

- "Holy Spirit, Living Water", published in Songs of Grace: Supplement to Together in Song, Australian Hymn Book II
- "God in the darkness, God beyond our knowing", Hymn # 17 in More Voices

In 2018, she authored "Nothing Less than Love Has Saved Us" for the installation of Archbishop Kay Goldworthy

== Honours ==
At the 2020 Queen's Birthday Honours, Smith was appointed a Member of the Order of Australia for her contributions to liturgical scholarship and to the Anglican Church of Australia.

== Works ==
- Praise the God of Grace: Hymns for Inclusive Worship (1990) ISBN 0646012312
- Rejoice!: For God Has Called Us: Hymns for Inclusive Worship (1993) ISBN 0646142860
- Songs for a Hopeful Church: Words for Inclusive Worship (1997) ISBN 0908284284
- Bearing Fruit in Due Season: Feminist Hermeneutics and the Bible in Worship (1999) ISBN 0814661718, 978-0814661710
- Prayers & Plays for Christmas and Holy Week (2006) ISBN 1920892931, 9781920892937

=== Articles ===
- Smith, Elizabeth J. "Changing the Words, Changing the World? Feminist Theory and Liturgical Language", Women-Church: Australian Journal of Feminist Studies in Religion, no. 14 (1994): 28–35. Digitised version of no. 14 (1994) available on JSTOR Open Community Collections, University of Divinity Digital Collections, Mannix Library
- Smith, Elizabeth J. "God in the New Songs: The Proclamation of Inclusive Language Hymnody", Women-Church: Australian Journal of Feminist Studies in Religion, no. 17 (1995): 13–18. Digitised version of no. 17 (1995) available on JSTOR Open Community Collections, University of Divinity Digital Collections, Mannix Library

== See also ==
- Anglican church music
- Inclusive language
