= Mandjelia paluma =

Scientific classification
- Kingdom: Animalia
- Phylum: Arthropoda
- Subphylum: Chelicerata
- Class: Arachnida
- Order: Araneae
- Infraorder: Mygalomorphae
- Family: Barychelidae
- Genus: Mandjelia
- Species: M. paluma

Binomial name
- Mandjelia paluma Raven & Churchill, 1994

Species of spider

Mandjelia paluma is a species of mygalomorph spider in the Barychelidae family. It is endemic to Australia. It was described in 1994 by Australian arachnologists Robert Raven and Tracey Churchill. The specific epithet paluma refers to the type locality.

== Distribution and habitat ==
The species occurs in North Queensland in open forest, rainforest and montane heath habitats. The type locality is the Paluma Range, between Ingham and Townsville.
