= Mandjelia wooroonooran =

Scientific classification
- Kingdom: Animalia
- Phylum: Arthropoda
- Subphylum: Chelicerata
- Class: Arachnida
- Order: Araneae
- Infraorder: Mygalomorphae
- Family: Barychelidae
- Genus: Mandjelia
- Species: M. wooroonooran

Binomial name
- Mandjelia wooroonooran Raven & Churchill, 1994

Species of spider

Mandjelia wooroonooran is a species of mygalomorph spider in the Barychelidae family. It is endemic to Australia. It was described in 1994 by Australian arachnologists Robert Raven and Tracey Churchill. The specific epithet wooroonooran comes from an Aboriginal name for Mount Bellenden Ker.

== Distribution and habitat ==
The species occurs in Far North Queensland in rainforest habitats. The type locality is the Bellenden Ker Range.
