= Denise Goldsworthy =

Australian business executive

Denise Goldsworthy AO FTSE
- Born: 1964 or 1965 (age 60–61)
- Education: University of Newcastle
- Occupation: Business executive
- Organization: Alternate Futures Pty Ltd
- Board member of: Edith Cowan University
- Awards: Telstra Australian Business Woman of the Year (2010); Western Australian Women's Hall of Fame (2011)

Denise Carol Goldsworthy (born 1964/1965) is an Australian business executive. After a 30-year career in the mining industry she opened Alternate Futures, a consultancy business, in 2013. She has also held a number of non-executive board and chairman roles. In January 2022 she took over as fifth Chancellor of Edith Cowan University.

== Early life and education ==
Denise Carol Goldsworthy joined BHP Steel in 1982 and studied part-time at the University of Newcastle, graduating with a bachelor of metallurgy and University Medal in 1989.

== Career ==
Goldsworthy was constantly learning on the job, working in 14 different jobs and being promoted to senior manager. She worked as principal consultant and then in general management roles at Hamersley Iron from 1998 to 2002.

In 2002 she joined Rio Tinto and filled a number of roles, including managing director of Dampier Salt and HIsmelt and, finally, chief commercial officer, Autonomous Haul Trucks.

Leaving Rio Tinto, she founded Alternate Futures, of which she is the managing principal, in October 2013.

== Board and other memberships ==
Goldsworthy serves on a number of boards, including Western Power. As of 2021, she is chair of both ChemCentre WA and the Trustees of the Navy Clearance Divers' Trust (WA).

Previous board appointments include the Minerals Research Institute of WA (2016–2020), Export Finance Australia (2014–2020).

Goldsworthy has been a member of the council of Edith Cowan University (ECU) since 2013. She was elected fifth Chancellor of ECU and took up her appointment in January 2022.

She is a member of Chief Executive Women.

== Honours and recognition ==
In 2010 Goldsworthy was named Telstra Australian Business Woman of the Year.

In 2011 she was inducted into the Western Australian Women's Hall of Fame and awarded the Alumni Award for National Leadership by the University of Newcastle.

She was appointed Fellow of the Australian Academy of Technology and Engineering in 2013.

Goldsworthy was appointed an Officer of the Order of Australia in the 2020 Queen's Birthday Honours for "distinguished service to business, particularly to technological innovation and research in the mining and manufacturing sectors".
