= Mandjelia brassi =

Scientific classification
- Kingdom: Animalia
- Phylum: Arthropoda
- Subphylum: Chelicerata
- Class: Arachnida
- Order: Araneae
- Infraorder: Mygalomorphae
- Family: Barychelidae
- Genus: Mandjelia
- Species: M. brassi

Binomial name
- Mandjelia brassi Raven & Churchill, 1994

Species of spider

Mandjelia brassi is a species of mygalomorph spider in the Barychelidae family. It is endemic to Australia. It was described in 1994 by Australian arachnologists Robert Raven and Tracey Churchill. The specific epithet brassi honours Australian-born American botanist Leonard Brass, who led the 1948 Archbold Expedition to Cape York.

== Distribution and habitat ==
The species occurs in Far North Queensland in rainforest habitats. The type locality is Cape Tribulation in the Daintree National Park.
