= Mandjelia commoni =

Scientific classification
- Kingdom: Animalia
- Phylum: Arthropoda
- Subphylum: Chelicerata
- Class: Arachnida
- Order: Araneae
- Infraorder: Mygalomorphae
- Family: Barychelidae
- Genus: Mandjelia
- Species: M. commoni

Binomial name
- Mandjelia commoni Raven & Churchill, 1994

Species of spider

Mandjelia commoni is a species of mygalomorph spider in the Barychelidae family. It is endemic to Australia. It was described in 1994 by Australian arachnologists Robert Raven and Tracey Churchill. The specific epithet commoni honours Australian lepidopterist Ian F.B. Common for contributions to natural history.

== Distribution and habitat ==
The species occurs in Far North Queensland in rainforest. The type locality is Majors Mountain, near Ravenshoe, in the Tablelands Region.
