= Rebecca Johnson (geneticist) =

Australian geneticist

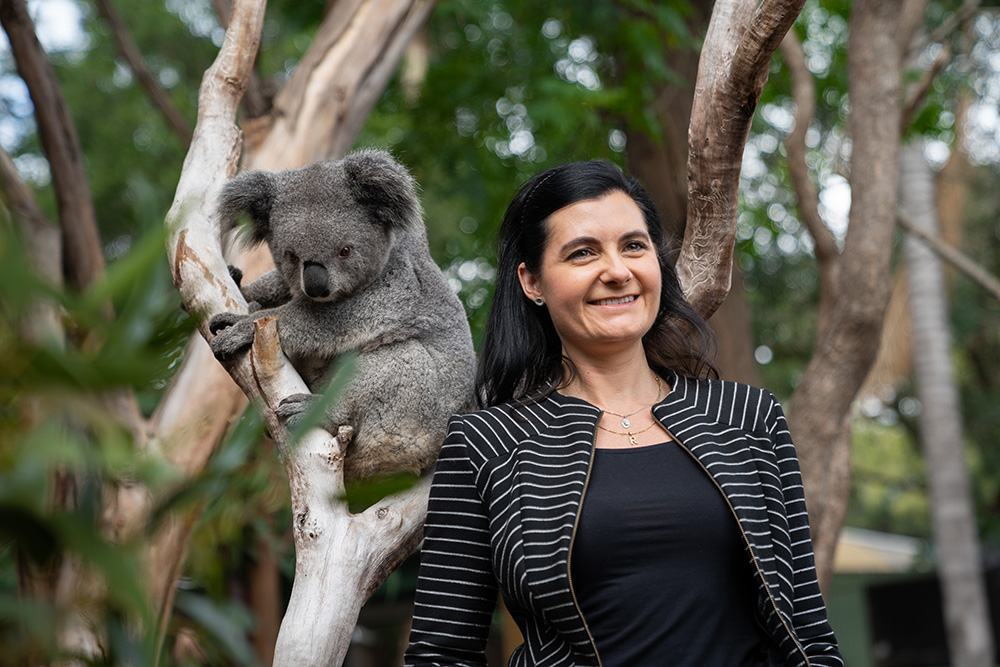
Dr Rebecca Johnson with a Koala at Featherdale Wildlife Park in Sydney, Australia.

Rebecca Nicole Johnson AM is an Australian geneticist, science communicator, and former Chief Scientist of the Australian Museum. In 2026, she is the Associate Director for Science and Chief Scientist at the Smithsonian National Museum of Natural History in Washington, DC.

From April 2015 to February 2020, Johnson was Director of the Australian Museum Research Institute (AMRI), Sydney, the first female to be appointed to the role since the establishment of the Australian Museum in 1827. She also founded the Australian Museum's Australian Centre for Wildlife Genomics, a wildlife forensics laboratory based at the Australian Museum.

Johnson is co-chief investigator of the Koala Genome Consortium and co-founder of the Oz Mammals Genomics Framework Data Initiative.

== Background and education ==
Johnson was born in Minlaton, South Australia before moving to Sydney during primary school, she then attended Barrenjoey High School on Sydney's Northern Beaches. Johnson graduated from a Bachelor of Science (Hons) at the University of Sydney in 1996 and was then awarded her PhD in molecular evolutionary genetics through La Trobe University in 2000.

== Research ==
Johnson has worked in animal molecular genetics in laboratories in Sydney, Townsville Queensland, Melbourne and Boston USA. She joined the Australian Museum in 2003 as laboratory manager, later became Head of Research before becoming head of the Australian Centre for Wildlife Genomics (a multifaceted management role as head of the Wildlife Genetics Laboratory, Frozen Tissue collection and overseeing the Microscopy & Microanalysis laboratory). As of October 2026, she is the Chief Scientist and Associate Director of science at the Smithsonian, National Museum of Natural History.

Johnson established the position of Chief Investigator of The Koala Genome Consortium, in partnership with the University of NSW, the University of Sydney, and the University of the Sunshine Coast. The complete koala genome was published in Nature Genetics in July 2018. The team is sequencing the genome and transcriptome of the koala to assist in the conservation of this threatened species.

Johnson, along with others, established the Australian Museum as a prominent institution in wildlife forensic science, a sub-discipline of forensic science that utilises the Museum's unique collections, expertise, and laboratory facilities. Johnson's team works across industry, law enforcement and academia as the Australian Centre for Wildlife Genomics, and is one of the few ISO 17025 accredited wildlife forensic science laboratories in the Australasian region. The team works with wildlife managers from zoos, the aviation industry, or government organisations who want to utilise DNA and genomics techniques for animal management or in DNA based wildlife forensic science for law enforcement.

Johnson has worked with sample types as diverse as shark fins, bird embryos, gall bladders, seized fish meat, salted animal skin, bones and horns. Some of these cases have resulted in prosecution and heavy penalties in court.

Johnson is a member of the Australian Academy of Forensic Sciences, and in 2014 Johnson became one of the few people in Australia to be appointed as a Wildlife Forensic Examiner by the Australian Federal Environment Minister under section 303GS(1) of Commonwealth Environment Protection and Biodiversity Protection Act 1999. She is also a certified wildlife forensic scientist under the certification program run by the International Society for Wildlife Forensic Science.

Johnson was president of the Australian New Zealand Forensic Science Society, New South Wales Branch and secretary of the Genetics Society of Australasia and is Director of Membership and Outreach of the International Society of Wildlife Forensic Science. She is a Fellow of the Royal Society of New South Wales (FRSN). Johnson's career has been supported by her science mentors Marianne Frommer, John Sved, and the late Professor Ross Crozier. Likewise, Johnson became a science mentor of several students and young researchers.

In mid-2026, her h-index is 30.
