= Jan Watson =

Australian marine biologist

Jeannette E. Watson
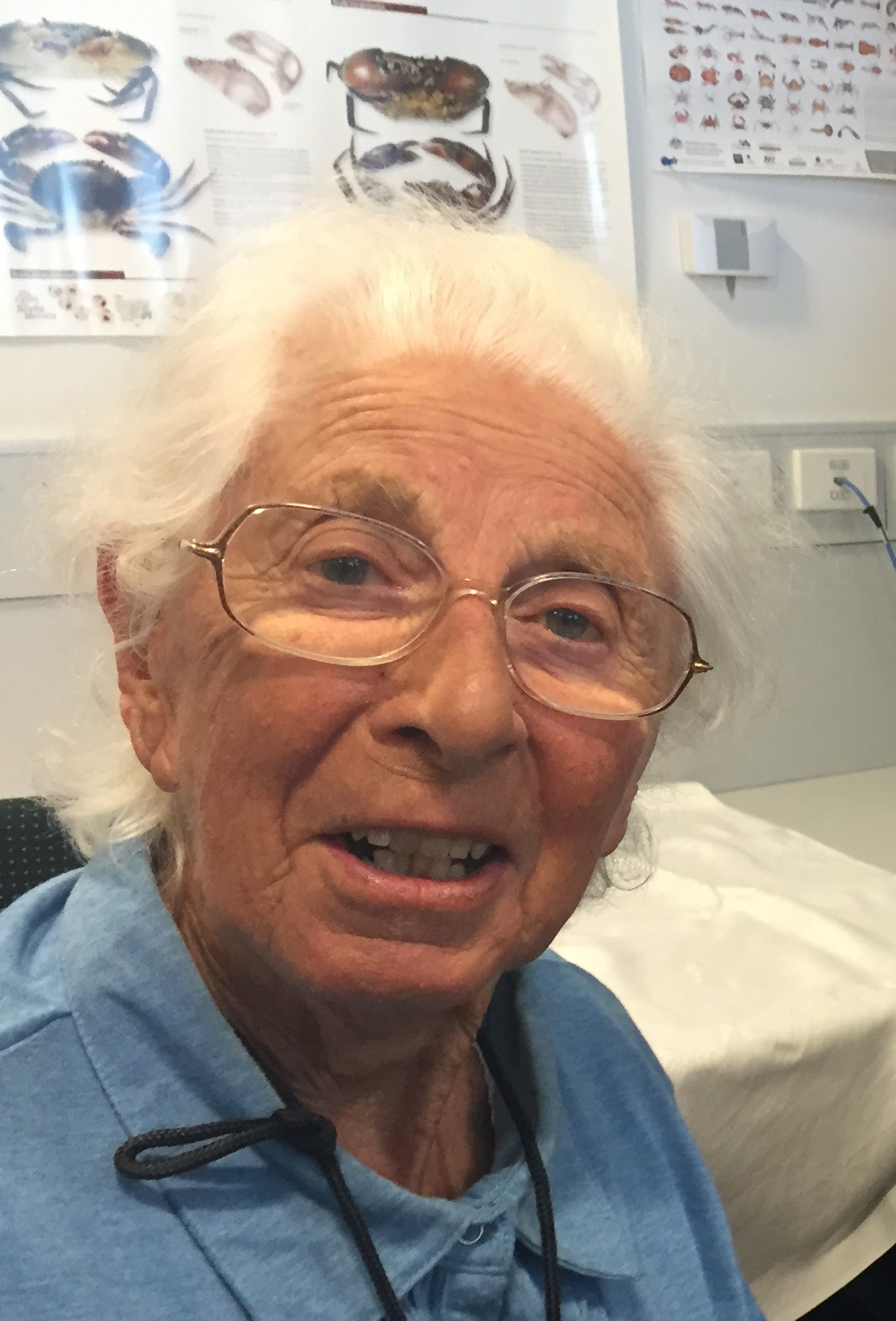
- Jan Watson at Museums Victoria, December 2010
- Born: 12 October 1927; Ballarat, Australia
- Died: 7 November 2021 (aged 94)
- Citizenship: Australian
- Education: Federation University Australia, Deakin University
- Scientific career
- Fields: marine biologist, zoologist
- Workplaces: Marine Science and Ecology environmental consultancy
- Author abbrev. (zoology): Watson

Jeannette Esther "Jan" Watson née Perkins (12 October 1927 – 7 November 2021) was an Australian marine biologist and invertebrate zoologist who was born in Ballarat. She is best known for her work on the taxonomy of Hydrozoa (hydroids) and for being one of the first female Scuba divers in Australia.

== Career ==
Jan Watson was the first female geology student to graduate from the Ballarat School of Mines campus of Federation University Australia in 1947 and received two higher degrees for research into marine Hydrozoa: she received the first master's degree awarded by the Victoria Institute of Colleges in 1970 and a PhD from Deakin University. Watson was nominated as Distinguished Alumna of Federation University Australia in 2019. In 2020 she was made Member of the Order of Australia (AM) for significant service to marine science and ecology, and to professional associations.

Jan Watson learned to Scuba dive beginning in 1958 as a member of the Victorian Sub Aqua Group and was a pioneer scientific diver in Australia, continuing to dive well into her 80s.

As a diver Watson first saw the encrusting colonies of marine invertebrates called hydroids. Research into hydroid taxonomy and, especially, describing new species became a focus for the rest of her scientific life. Watson described 176 species of hydrozoa. Watson had long associations with the Marine Research Group of the Field Naturalists Club of Victoria and with Museums Victoria where she was an Honorary Associate and where the majority of her hydroid collection is now deposited. The biological consulting company, Marine Science & Ecology, that Watson founded and directed for over 45 years is said to be the first such consultancy in Australia.
