= Table Tops =

Former newspaper in Australia

Front cover of Table Tops, issue 103, dated 14 September 1945.

Table Tops was a free daily newspaper produced for Australian Army personnel, published in the Atherton Tableland Training Area in Queensland, Australia, with regional editions produced abroad for serving personnel.

Table Tops was produced by the staff of the AIF News, who were part of the First Australian Army Printing and Press Unit. The newspaper was produced seven days a week: weekday and Saturday editions were four pages long while Sunday editions were eight pages. The pages were demy quarto size. Occasional special editions were produced in addition to the daily editions. It contained news on the progress of the war, as well as home news such as current events in Australia and sport results.

It was published in Atherton during the Second World War, where it was typeset on Linotype machines and then printed on an old Wharfedale printing press on overnight print runs so that the paper was ready to be sent to units for breakfast. During the Second World War, the editor of Table Tops was Major C. H. Cheong.

Regional editions were produced abroad for serving personnel. These were produced in camps, with mobile generators and truck-mounted printing equipment. News was collected by listening to short-wave radio broadcasts from India, Hawaii, the BBC and Australia. These regional editions were produced at places such as Morotai in the Maluku Islands, and in Balikpapan and Brunei in Borneo.
