= Tracy Smart =

Australian physician, medical administrator and retired RAAF senior officer

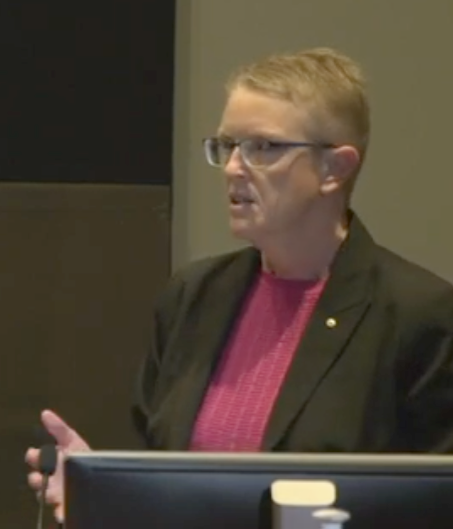
- At a talk at the Australian National University in 2023
- Military career
- Allegiance: Australia
- Branch: Royal Australian Air Force
- Service years: 1985–2019
- Rank: Air Vice Marshal
- Commands: Joint Health Command (2015–19); Strategic Health Coordination (2013–15); General Garrison Health Operations (2010–12); Air Force Health Services (2009–10); Health Services Wing (2004–06); RAAF Institute of Aviation Medicine (1997–99)
- Conflicts: Rwanda (UNAMIR); East Timor (UNTAET); War in Afghanistan; Iraq War
- Awards: Officer of the Order of Australia

Air Vice Marshal Tracy Lee Smart, AO is an Australian physician, medical administrator, and a retired senior officer in the Royal Australian Air Force (RAAF). She served as Commander of Joint Health Command and Surgeon General of the Australian Defence Force from December 2015 to December 2019. Smart was the third woman to reach the rank of air vice marshal in the RAAF.

== Early life and education ==
Smart grew up at Kangarilla, South Australia, and was educated at Willunga High School. She studied medicine at Flinders University, graduating in 1987. She completed her medical training in Adelaide hospitals before commencing full-time duty with the Royal Australian Air Force (RAAF) in January 1989, having joined the service in 1985.

Smart later read for a Master of Public Health at the University of Queensland in 2007 and a Master of Arts in Strategic Studies at Deakin University in 2009. She is also a graduate of the Centre for Defence and Strategic Studies and the Harvard Business School Advanced Management Program.

== RAAF career ==
Smart served as Medical Officer at RAAF Base Amberley in 1989 and Medical and later Senior Medical Officer at RAAF Base Pearce from 1990 to 1991, before undertaking a two-year exchange with the Royal Air Force to receive specialist training in Aviation Medicine. She returned to Australia in 1993, was promoted squadron leader and assigned as Senior Medical Officer at No. 6 RAAF Hospital and, later, RAAF Base Williamtown. She was deployed to the United Nations Assistance Mission for Rwanda in 1995.

Smart undertook an exchange with the United States Air Force in 2000 and 2001, then deployed to Timor Leste as Chief Health Officer, HQ Peacekeeping Force and Australian Senior Health Officer in Timor Leste. She served in Iraq and Afghanistan from 2003 to 2004, and was appointed a Member of the Order of Australia in the 2012 Queen's Birthday Honours.

Smart was promoted to air vice marshal in November 2015 and succeeded Rear Admiral Robyn Walker as Commander Joint Health and Surgeon General of the Australian Defence Force (ADF) on 3 December 2015. She was appointed an Officer of the Order of Australia in the 2019 Queen's Birthday Honours, and handed over Joint Health Command to Rear Admiral Sarah Sharkey on 4 December that year.

Smart has led the ADF contingent at the Sydney Gay and Lesbian Mardi Gras three times and was the first lesbian to reach two-star officer rank in the ADF.

== Oral History ==
An oral history interview with Smart from 2023 is accessible through the National Library of Australia.

Military offices
Preceded by Rear Admiral Robyn Walker	Commander Joint Health Command; 2015–2019	Succeeded by Rear Admiral Sarah Sharkey
