= Sarah Sharkey =

Royal Australian Navy officer

- Alma mater: University of Queensland
- Spouse: Frank
- Children: Four
- Military career
- Allegiance: Australia
- Branch: Royal Australian Navy
- Service years: 1992–2024
- Rank: Rear Admiral
- Commands: Joint Health Command
- Conflicts: Operation Trek
- Awards: Member of the Order of Australia; Conspicuous Service Cross

Rear Admiral Sarah Edith Sharkey, AM, CSC is an Australian physician, medical administrator, and a retired senior officer of the Royal Australian Navy. She served as Commander Joint Health Command and Surgeon General of the Australian Defence Force from December 2019 to December 2023.

While holding the rank of captain, Sharkey was awarded a Conspicuous Service Cross in the 2014 Queen's Birthday Honours for "outstanding achievement as the Director of Clinical Governance and Projects and Australian Defence Force Health Services Project Transition Lead". She was appointed as a Member of the Order of Australia in the 2020 Queen's Birthday Honours "for exceptional service to the Australian Defence Force in the management of health care".

== Personal life ==
Sharkey is married to Frank and has four children.

Military offices
Preceded by Air Vice Marshal Tracy Smart	Commander Joint Health Command; 2019–2023	Succeeded by Rear Admiral Sonya Bennett
