= Rhondda Jones =

Rhondda Elizabeth Jones AM (born 2 November 1945) was the first Professor of Zoology and the first female professor at James Cook University, and served as Deputy Vice-Chancellor from 1997 to 2000. Professor Jones was previously the Chair of the Academic Board of James Cook University. In 2019 she is Director, Research Development in the division of Tropical Health & Medicine at James Cook University.

Rhondda Jones was appointed a Member of the Order of Australia in the 2020 Queen’s Birthday Honours List.
