= Styphelia rupicola =

Scientific classification
- Kingdom: Plantae
- Clade: Tracheophytes
- Clade: Angiosperms
- Clade: Eudicots
- Clade: Asterids
- Order: Ericales
- Family: Ericaceae
- Genus: Styphelia
- Species: S. rupicola

Binomial name
- Styphelia rupicola (C.T.White) Sleumer
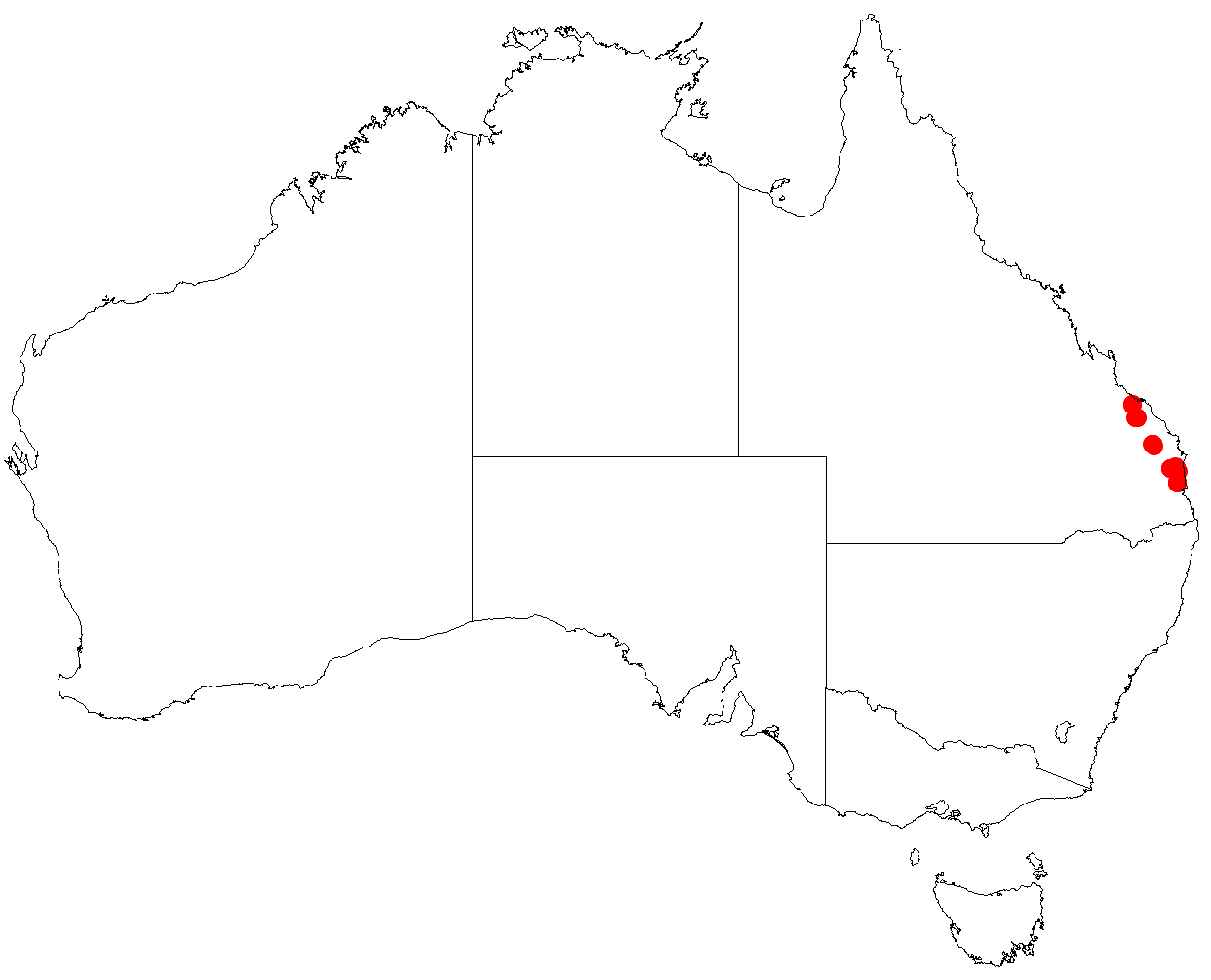
- Occurrence data from AVH

Synonyms
- Leucopogon rupicola C.T.White

Species of plant

Styphelia rupicola is a species of flowering plant in the heath family Ericaceae and is endemic to Queensland. It is a shrub with linear leaves and white, tube-shaped flowers usually arranged singly in leaf axils.

== Description ==
Styphelia rupicola is a dense shrub that typically grows to a height of 1.0–1.5 m (3 ft 3 in – 4 ft 11 in). Its leaves are linear to lance-shaped, 10–14 mm (0.39–0.55 in) long, sharply pointed and hairy on both sides. The flowers are borne singly in leaf axils, the sepals egg-shaped and about 3 mm (0.12 in) long. The petals are white, 7 mm (0.28 in) long and joined at the base, forming a tube much longer than the sepals.

This leucopogon is similar to S. margarodes, but is a smaller plant, the leaves usually hairy, the flowers larger but solitary and the petal tube much longer than the sepals.

== Taxonomy ==
This species was first formally described in 1944 by C.T. White who gave it the name Leucopogon rupicola in the Proceedings of the Royal Society of Queensland from specimens he collected on Biggenden Bluff in the Mount Walsh National Park in 1931. In 1963, Hermann Otto Sleumer transferred the species to Styphelia as S. rupicola in the journal Blumea. The specific epithet (rupicola) means "cliff inhabitant".

== Distribution and habitat ==
Styphelia rupicola grows on mountain summits and rocky hillslopes in south-east Queensland.
