= Cane Toads: An Unnatural History =

- Directed by: Mark Lewis
- Written by: Mark Lewis
- Cinematography: Jim Frazier; Wayne Taylor
- Edited by: Lindsay Frazer
- Music by: Martin Armiger
- Distributed by: Ronin Films
- Release dates: 9 June 1988 (Australia); 11 September 1988 (Canada); 30 September 1988 (U.S.)
- Running time: 47 minutes
- Country: Australia
- Language: English

Cane Toads: An Unnatural History is a 1988 documentary film about the introduction of cane toads to Australia. Cane toads were introduced to Australia with the aim of controlling a sugar cane pest, the cane beetle, but they over-multiplied and became a serious problem in the Australian ecosystem. It is often humorous, and is used in high schools and colleges as a complement to curricula in biology, ecology, environmental science, anthropology, geography, and communication. It was filmed in Cairns and Gordonvale in Queensland.

The film was nominated for a BAFTA Film Award for Best Short Film. It is distributed in the United States by Radio Pictures.

Unusual for a film considered a cult classic, Cane Toads performed very well during its theatrical release. Released in March 1988, the film grossed $613,910 Australian dollars (not adjusted for inflation) as of 2012 and has been one of the top grossing Australian documentaries of all time.

== Production elements ==
One of the film's aesthetic and storytelling "innovations" was to try and tell much of the story from the cane toads' point of view. This was achieved by a number of extremely low angle shots. Lewis' goal was to give a voice to the toads who were at the center of so much controversy, and "create some sympathy for this animal that was so widely reviled".

Mark Lewis worked with director of photography Jim Frazier on Cane Toads because Frazier had constructed a set of lenses that were ideal for the project. Eventually, Panavision picked up the lenses and they became known as the Frazier lenses. For his interviews, Lewis used a mirror box to give the impression that the subjects were staring down the lens of the camera.

Lewis avoided harming toads and other wildlife during the production of the film. During a scene in which a man talks about intentionally running over toads with his car, footage appears to show a car swerving to hit toads. To simulate this, Lewis used potatoes which when shot at a distance appeared like toads on the road.

== Funding and distribution ==
The film was funded by Film Australia. It was initially released theatrically in Australia by Ronin Films and premiered at the Sydney Opera House on 29 February 1988, where it ran for two weeks before transferring to the Mandolin Cinema in central Sydney where it ran until 16 November. It ran in many other cinemas around Australia and currently still ranks high in Australian box office records for documentaries. The film was subsequently released on VHS later DVD in Australia, the US, and the UK (IMDb, 2011a). Excerpts of the film are also available online as teaching aids. Production Company: Film Australia. Distributors: Ronin Films (theatrical only from 1988) (Australia); First Run Features (1999) (USA) (VHS); First Run Features (2001) (USA) (DVD); Umbrella Entertainment (2003) (Australia) (DVD); Unique Films (UK) (VHS) (IMDb, 2011a).

== Reception ==
On review aggregator website Rotten Tomatoes, the film holds an approval rating of 88% based on 8 reviews, with an average rating of 7.6/10.

== Sequel ==
A sequel called Cane Toads: The Conquest premiered at the 2010 Sundance Film Festival. A completely new feature, almost twice as long as the first film, it is said to be the first Australian 3D digital film. In the years since the first film, the cane toad "multiplied alarmingly" to become a "seemingly unstoppable menace." The sequel/remake was released in Sydney in June 2011. Both films were written and directed by Mark Lewis. Their cultural impact and moral complexity were explored in an essay by Elizabeth Farrelly.

== Bibliography ==
- Lewis, M. (2010). The making—and the meaning—of Cane Toads: The Conquest. Cane toads and other rogue species (pp. 19–32). New York: PublicAffairs.
- Mitman, G. (1999). Epilogue. Reel nature: America's romance with wildlife on films (pp. 203–208). Cambridge, Mass.: Harvard University Press.
- Morris, E. Eye Contact: Interrotron. Errol Morris. Retrieved 20 November 2011
- Murray, R. L., & Heumann, J. K. (2009). Ecology and popular film: Cinema on the edge. Albany: State University of New York Press.
- Petterson, P. B. (2011). Cameras into the wild: a history of early wildlife and expedition filmmaking, 1895–1928. Jefferson, N.C.: McFarland.
- Weber, K. (2010). Cane toads and other rogue species. New York: PublicAffairs.
- SEWPaC. Invasive species in Australia – Fact sheet. Australian Government Department of Sustainability, Environment, Water, Population and Communities (SEWPaC). Retrieved 30 November 2011.
- West, Jackson. (2007). Top Ten Online Filmmaking Techniques. Gigaom.
