= Harry Frauca =

- Born: 14 October 1928; Girona, Spain
- Died: 1986; Bundaberg, Queensland, Australia
- Occupations: Naturalist; writer; photographer
- Spouse: Claudia (Claudy) Frauca
- Children: Moira Thompson

Harry Frauca (14 October 1928 – 1986) was an Australian naturalist, writer and photographer of Spanish Catalan origin, he was born in Girona, Spain and educated in Denmark and England. In 1955 he migrated to Australia from Denmark with his wife Claudia, citing his occupation as a "freelance magazine writer". Over a career spanning more than two decades, Frauca authored or co-authored over 25 books on Australian wildlife and contributed significantly to knowledge of native animal behaviour at a time when few such publications existed.

== Early life and migration ==
Frauca was born on 14 October 1928 in Girona, Spain to a Catalan family. He was educated in Denmark and England before migrating to Australia in 1955 with his wife Claudia. They arrived in Adelaide and shortly afterwards moved to Hobart, Tasmania.

== Career ==
=== Government photography ===
After arriving in Australia, Frauca began working as a photographer for newspapers, magazines, and the Australian News and Information Bureau (ANIB). The main aim of the ANIB was to encourage migrants to come to Australia by advertising key industries such as forestry, fisheries, construction, farming, and manufacturing. Photographs taken by ANIB photographers often depicted an idealised image of Australian society. Frauca's work at the Bureau involved photographing animals, plants and scenery; photos of native wildlife were frequently in demand due to their significance in promoting Australia's national identity.

Frauca mostly took his photographs in Tasmania and Queensland, where he moved later in life. A 1966 review in the journal Oryx noted that Frauca appreciated "the need to live in the bush to do his work properly and the advantages of photographing anything of interest that comes his way, rather than making special trips in pursuit of particular species", in contrast to his ANIB colleagues who travelled around Australia for weeks at a time photographing an area before moving on.

=== Writing and natural history ===
From 1960, Frauca became a full-time writer and photographer on natural history, contributing with his wife Claudy to such publications as Walkabout. His books covered a wide range of Australian fauna, including birds, reptiles, insects, and mammals, and were often illustrated with his own photographs. From 1970 he also collected insects for the Australian National Insect Collection. His daughter Moira Thompson has stated that three insects found at Mount Walsh National Park — a fly, a wasp and a cockroach — were named after him.

=== Conservation advocacy ===
Frauca's books called for the protection of native habitats, and were significant at a time when there were very few publications on the behaviour of native Australian animals. He documented the decline of native birds and their habitats due to land clearing for farming and agriculture. In his 1971 book Australian Bush Birds, Frauca wrote: "It is essential to know the detailed life history of a species … the day when their life histories will be well known seems a long way off". While living in Bundaberg, he promoted the conservation of Baldwin Swamp during the 1970s; the swamp was gazetted as an environmental park in 1981, possibly as a result of his advocacy.

== Personal life ==
The last years of Frauca's life were spent in Bundaberg, Queensland, with his wife Claudia. He died in 1986.

== Legacy ==
Frauca has been honoured in the name of the Harry Frauca Walkway, a 200 m (660 ft) walkway at Baldwin Swamp Environmental Park, Bundaberg, as well as the Harry Frauca Walking Track and Harry Frauca Information Panel at the Mount Walsh National Park, Biggenden. An annual memorial walk is held on 13 October, the day before his birthday.

== Bibliography ==
As well as articles in Walkabout and elsewhere, books authored or coauthored by Frauca include:

- n.d. (c.1950) – In a New Country. Paterson Brokensha: Perth.
- 1963 – Encounters with Australian Animals. William Heinemann Ltd: Melbourne. (With Claudy Frauca).
- 1965 – The Book of Australian Wild Life. Heinemann: London.
- 1966 – Harry Frauca's Book of Reptiles. Jacaranda: Brisbane.
- 1967 – Birds from the Seas, Swamps and Scrubs of Australia. William Heinemann Ltd: Melbourne.
- 1968 – Harry Frauca's Book of Insects. Jacaranda: Brisbane.
- 1969 – Striped Wolf. A Bush Adventure. Heinemann: Melbourne.
- 1970 – A Pictorial Encyclopaedia of Australian Wildlife. Periwinkle Books. (With Claudy Frauca).
- 1971 – Animal Behaviour. Periwinkle Books.
- 1971 – Australian Bush Birds. Lansdowne Press: Melbourne.
- 1973 – Australian Insect Wonders. Rigby: Australia. (With Densey Clyne).
- 1974 – Australian Bird Wonders. Rigby: Australia.
- 1974 – Australian Insects. Australian Universities Press.
- 1974 – Australian Reptiles. Australian Universities Press.
- 1974 – The Echidna. Lansdowne Press: Melbourne. (With Barbara Burton).
- 1974 – Kangaroo: the unknown quantity. Sungravure: Sydney.
- 1976 – Adventures with Australian Animals. Rigby: Australia.
- 1977 – The Australian Bush in Colour. Ure Smith. (With Claudy Frauca).
- 1977 – In Praise of Australian Birds. Rigby: Adelaide.
- 1978 – Bushwalking: a Guide to Bushcraft. Murray Book Distributors: Sydney.
- 1980 – The Australian Bird Spotter's Book. The behaviour of birds in their natural landscapes. Reed: Sydney.
- 1980 – Pack Manual of Tracks, Signs and Nests. Reed: Sydney.
- 1981 – Native Birds of Australia. Pan Macmillan. (With Susan Drury).
- 1982 – What animal is that?: a guide to Australian amphibians, insects, mammals, reptiles and spiders. Reed: Sydney.
- 1983 – Birds of Australia. Currey O'Neil: Melbourne.
