= The Last Frontier (miniseries) =

- Written by: Michael Laurence; John Misto
- Directed by: Simon Wincer
- Starring: Linda Evans; Jack Thompson; Jason Robards; Judy Morris; Tony Bonner; John Ewart; Craig Hutton; Nan Hutton
- Music by: Brian May
- Countries of origin: Australia; United States
- Original language: English

Production
- Producer: Tim Saunders
- Cinematography: Ian Baker
- Editor: Tony Paterson
- Running time: 180 minutes
- Production companies: Taft Hardie Group; McElroy & McElroy; Hanna-Barbera Australia
- Budget: $12 million

Original release
- Release: 5 October – 7 October 1986

The Last Frontier is a 1986 American-Australian television miniseries starring Linda Evans, Jack Thompson and Jason Robards.

== Plot ==
The series is set in Los Angeles and Australia. Kate Adamson (Linda Evans) is a struggling single mother from Los Angeles. She meets and falls in love with Australian cattle station owner Tom Hannon (Tony Bonner) who is visiting America. The couple marry after a two-week courtship. Tom leaves for Australia and Kate agrees to follow. Her two children Tina and Marty are unenthusiastic about the move but are convinced by their mother to come along.

They arrive in the Northern Territory, but Tom is not there to meet them. Unaware that Tom has been killed in a plane crash on the way home from California, they make their way to Larapinta, Tom's cattle station near Alice Springs. Their arrival comes as a shock to Tom's two young daughters Zoe and Emma who were not told of Tom's marriage (he wanted to surprise them). Kate considers leaving, but realizing that she has no money for a return trip, she resolves to stay despite a desperate drought.

She is soon visited by Ed Stenning (Jason Robards) and his daughter Meg (Judy Morris). Ed is a local land baron and the owner of Cutta Cutta, a huge station that borders Larapinta. Stenning wants to incorporate Larapinta into his holdings and tries to force Kate to sell. Her children want to sell and return to California but Tom's daughters insist that they keep the station going. Kate also begins a relationship with Nick Stenning, Ed's estranged son.

Larapinta's primary water bore runs dry and Kate must drill a new one or the cattle will die. Shortly after the well is drilled it is sabotaged. Marty sees Ed at the site of the explosion holding a stick of dynamite and Kate files charges against him. At the trial Ed collapses and it becomes apparent that he is dying. Ed and Nick reconcile and Nick realizes that it was Meg who blew up the bore.

Nick's reconciliation with Ed causes a break with Kate. Kate eventually realizes that Meg was responsible for the bore and Kate confronts Meg. Nick and Kate reconcile.

== Cast ==
- Linda Evans as Kate Hannon
- Jack Thompson as Nick Stenning
- Peter Billingsley as Marty Adamson
- Meredith Salenger as Tina Adamson
- Jason Robards as Ed Stenning
- Judy Morris as Megan "Meg" Stenning
- Beth Buchanan as Zoe Hannon
- Asher Keddie as Emma Hannon
- Tony Bonner as Tom Hannon
- John Ewart as Henry Dingwell
- Leslie Dayman as Bowman
- Les Foxcroft as Ralph

== Production ==
The miniseries was filmed on location the outback of the Northern Territory, and South Australia except for the Los Angeles scenes which were filmed in that city. The fictional Larapinta and Cutta Cutta stations were filmed on outback locations. The name of Larapinta is derived from an aboriginal word that means "salty river" while Cutta Cutta means "many stars". The cast included a mix of American and Australian actors.

It was one of many roles where Jack Thompson supported an American female star for American television.

== Reception ==
The mini-series was a huge ratings success in Australia, earning a share of 40%.
