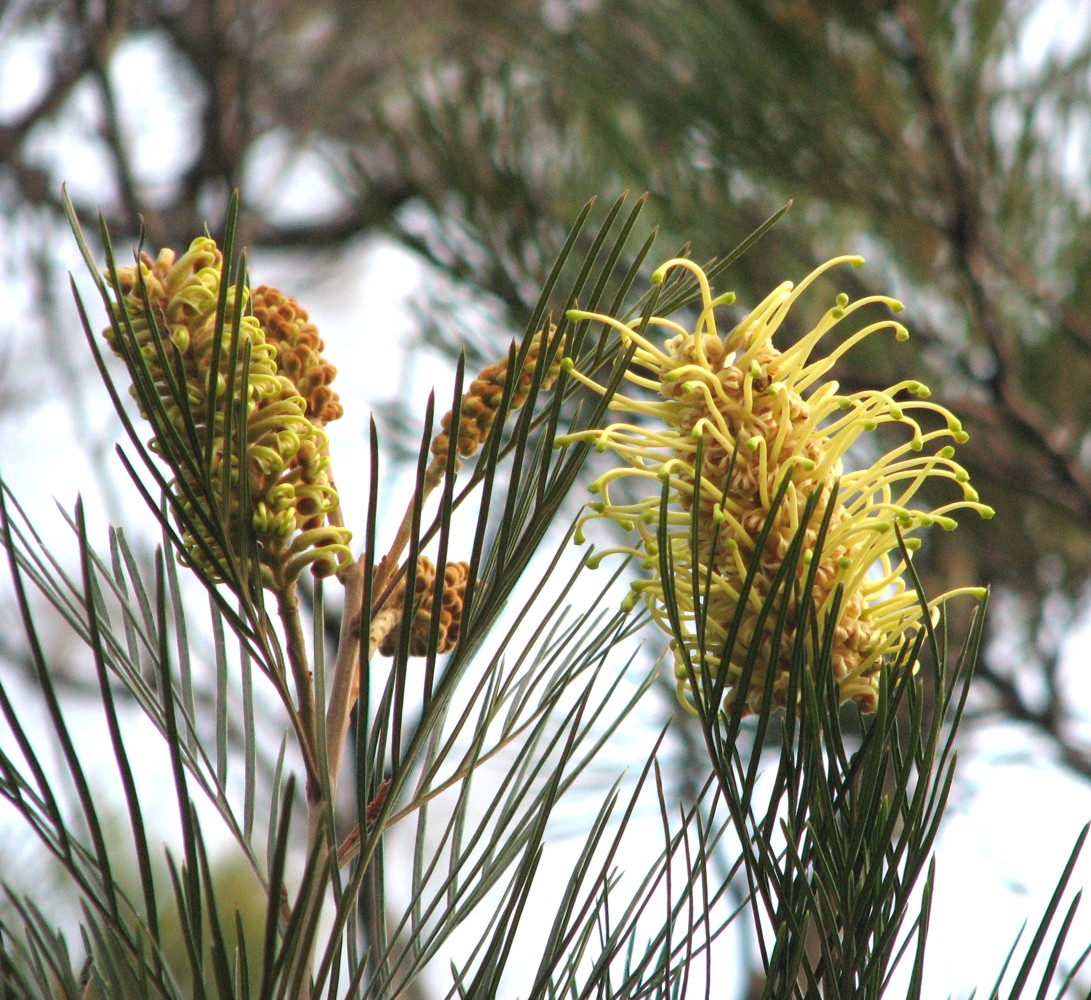
- In Maranoa Gardens

Scientific classification
- Kingdom: Plantae
- Clade: Tracheophytes
- Clade: Angiosperms
- Clade: Eudicots
- Order: Proteales
- Family: Proteaceae
- Genus: Grevillea
- Species: G. whiteana

Binomial name
- Grevillea whiteana McGill.

= Grevillea whiteana =

Mundubbera grevillea

Species of shrub endemic to Queensland, Australia

Grevillea whiteana, also known as Mundubbera grevillea, is species of flowering plant in the family Proteaceae and is endemic to Queensland. It is an erect shrub or small tree with pinnatisect leaves, the lobes linear and more or less parallel, and erect, cylindrical clusters of cream-coloured flowers.

== Description ==
Grevillea whiteana is an erect shrub or small tree that typically grows to a height of 2–9 m (6 ft 7 in – 29 ft 6 in). Its leaves are mostly 120–250 mm (4.7–9.8 in) long and pinnatisect with 10 to 18 linear, more or less parallel lobes 50–130 mm (2.0–5.1 in) long and 1–2.5 mm (0.039–0.098 in) wide. The edges of the lobes are rolled under, concealing the lower surface apart from the midvein. The flowers are arranged in erect, cylindrical clusters on a rachis mostly 80–120 mm (3.1–4.7 in) long. The flowers are cream-coloured, the pistil 43–46 mm (1.7–1.8 in) long. Flowering occurs from March to October and the fruit is a woolly-hairy follicle 14–18 mm (0.55–0.71 in) long.

== Taxonomy ==
Grevillea whiteana was first formally described in 1986 by Donald McGillivray in his book New Names in Grevillea (Proteaceae) from specimens collected from Glenwood Station, 48.3 km (30.0 mi) south-west of Mundubbera in 1974. The specific epithet (whiteana) honours C.T. White, government botanist of Queensland from 1918 to 1950.

== Distribution and habitat ==
Mundubbera grevillea grows in forest and on rocky slopes in sandy soil from Boondooma northward to Mundubbera and on Mt Walsh near Biggenden in south-eastern Queensland.

== Cultivars ==
The cultivar Grevillea 'Pink Surprise' is a cross between Grevillea whiteana and the red-flowering form of Grevillea banksii. It has pink flowers and grows to about 3 metres (9.8 ft) high.
