= Cane Toads: The Conquest =

2010 documentary film by Mark Lewis

- Film poster
- Directed by: Mark Lewis
- Written by: Mark Lewis
- Produced by: Mark Lewis
- Production companies: Radio Pictures; Participant Media; Discovery Studios; Screen Australia
- Release dates: 26 January 2010 (Sundance); 2 June 2011
- Running time: 84 minutes
- Country: Australia
- Language: English
- Box office: $61,450

Cane Toads: The Conquest, a 2010 documentary film by Mark Lewis, tracks the inexorable decades long march of the invasive cane toad across Australia, a "sequel of sorts" to his 1988 cult classic, Cane Toads: An Unnatural History. It is described as an "irreverent" blend of "history, nature footage, re-enactments and colorful testimony," documenting what is widely considered to be one of Australia's biggest environmental disasters through its effect on people. It was filmed in 3D.

== Plot ==
The film combines old newsreels, nature footage featuring cane toads in action, re-enactments of toad-related events, and the first-hand accounts of people's interactions with the toads. The story begins with the toads in full form 15 million years ago, and fast-forwards to the 1935 introduction of 102 cane toads to Australia in an ill-conceived attempt to take on the cane beetle devastating sugarcane crops. The toads' proliferation got out of hand, and they became a seriously invasive species, marching across Australia, capturing huge swaths of territory over the decades. Various characters, including scientists, farmers, and everyday people, provide testimony about the creatures.

== Production ==
The film was produced by Mark Lewis' independent Radio Pictures, based in Mullumbimby, Australia, in partnership with Americans Participant Media and Discovery Studios. It was shot in 3D with Silicon Imaging cameras.

== Reception ==
According to Box Office Mojo, the film has brought in under $100,000. On review aggregation website Rotten Tomatoes the film has an approval rating of 88% based on 16 reviews.
