= Densey Clyne =

Australian photographer and writer (1922–2019)

- Born: Dorothy Denise Bell; 4 December 1922; Risca, Wales, United Kingdom
- Died: 20 May 2019 (aged 96); Wauchope, New South Wales, Australia
- Occupations: Writer, director, naturalist, documentarian
- Known for: Macro photography
- Spouse: Peter Clyne (m. 1950, divorced)

Densey Clyne (born Dorothy Denise Bell, 4 December 1922 – 20 May 2019) was an Australian naturalist, photographer, writer, and documentarian. She is especially well known for her studies of spiders and insects. Clyne worked as a researcher, writer, narrator, and/or adviser on a number of productions in partnership with cinematographer Jim Frazier.

== Life ==
Clyne was born in Risca, Wales, United Kingdom, the youngest of three. When she was two, she and her family moved to New Zealand, where she spent her early years. In 1936, when Clyne was 12, the family was hit hard by the Great Depression and moved to Newcastle, Australia, so her father could find a job as an engineer. She left school at age 12, when she "simply refused to go back." That same year, she wrote her first nature article, which she published in Punch magazine. Before leaving home, she moved with her family a total of sixteen times. During World War II, she served as a commissioned officer in the Australian Women's Army Service, after a year in the Land Army. At age 28, she took up macro photography.

While working as a secretary in a solicitor's office, she met lawyer Peter Clyne and they married in 1950. They divorced in the 1970s but remained friends; both joked that "he walked out of the house when Lulu [a barking spider] walked in." At the time of her death, Clyne lived in Wauchope, New South Wales.

== Career ==
As a naturalist, conservationist, and communicator, Clyne wrote more than 30 books on natural history and environmental subjects, particularly insects and spiders. She also had regular columns in Australian Wildlife Magazine, This Australia, The Australian Women's Weekly, Burke's Backyard Magazine, Gardens and Outdoor Living, Australian Geographic,The Sydney Morning Herald and Australian Natural History. Clyne's scientific contributions included the first detailed description of the net-making behaviour and sperm induction of the spider Asianopis subrufa; the web structure of the spider Poecilopachys australasia; and a joint paper with David Rentz, CSIRO Insect Division, on Anthophiloptera dryas, a new orthopteran genus and species, studied and recorded over several years by Clyne in her Sydney garden.

Clyne wrote scripts for her own and other television documentaries on natural history, maintaining a partnership with filmmaker Jim Frazier. Together, they had a company called Mantis Wildlife Films, which was regarded as a world leader in miniature wildlife photography, which was highly specialised at the time. Their first documentary, Aliens Among Us (1975), was sponsored by Channel 10 and was sold to BBC. Clyne also acted as a consultant on local wildlife for Australian and overseas television film productions, including several by the BBC Natural History Unit, and had a regular natural history segment for eight years on Channel 9's Burke's Backyard. She delivered talks and addresses on invertebrate behaviour, the pleasures of insect-watching, natural history writing and wildlife filming to schools, adult groups, and professional organisations. In 1995, she served as a juror at Japan's Environmental Film Festival.

=== Films ===
For a 1971 feature The Australian Ark, Clyne was asked by producers Robert Raymond and Vincent Serventy to film her garden insects in macro as part of the Shell's Australia documentary series on Australia's natural heritage. Frazier, who was present at the meeting, offered to help; their first attempt at cinematography, based on her research into insect behaviour, was so successful that the team was commissioned to complete one entire programme for the series. This was the start of a 28-year filming partnership between Clyne and Frazier. In 1975, Clyne researched and wrote, and Frazier filmed two documentaries, Aliens Among Us and Garden Jungle, about the insects and spiders in her garden. These were sold first in Australia to the national 0–10 TV network and subsequently to the BBC in Britain and to networks in Germany, Holland, USA (Garden Jungle), Japan and Middle Eastern countries. Awards included the Australian Television Society's Golden Penguin.

In the mid-1970s, they produced four 20-minute educational documentary shorts: Come Into My Parlour Said the Spider... (1975), Now You See Me Now You Don't (1977), Blueprint for Survival (1977) and Every Care But No Responsibility (1977). This was followed by Butterfly Farming in Papua New Guinea in 1978, which was a 10-minute film made for the ABC's Weekend Magazine. The short was researched and scripted by Clyne. In 1979, Clyne and Frazier were chosen as one of ten teams to work on David Attenborough's documentary series Life on Earth. Clyne did the research and wrote the script for their segments. Notably, they were able to capture footage of a kowari giving birth, which had previously never been observed. The same year, they worked with producers Dione Gilmour and Peter Bale to film the BBC/ABC documentary Encounter Underground about bulldog ants. In 1980, they worked on Gippsland (ABC); on Lady of the Spiders (BBC/ABC) in 1981; and on Funnelweb (Forest Homes Films) in 1982.

Their partnership with Attenborough continued when they were commissioned by the BBC in 1983 as one of several filming teams to contribute to three BBC television series, The Living Planet, by Sir David Attenborough. They filmed sequences for these series in Borneo, Penang, West Sumatra and California, and were responsible for advising, researching and filming several Australian subjects, notably invertebrate animals. That year, their work was the subject of the ABC film Thrill of the Chase. Kinchega National Park, another ABC production, followed. In 1984, a one-hour BBC documentary about moths, Desire of the Moth, was released; it was conceived and written by Densey Clyne and filmed by Frazier. In 1985, The Sands of Time, a piece on Frazier Island, was produced by Yowie Films, written by Clyne and filmed by Frazier. Later that year was The Nature of Australia, a series of six one-hour documentaries for TV by ABC about the evolution of Australia's fauna.

In 1986, Clyne conceived, wrote, and directed To Be a Butterfly, an Oxford Scientific Films/Anglia TV documentary on tropical butterflies. She also participated in Jamie Robertson's Sounds Like Australia, for which she filmed and recorded the sound of wildlife as part of Mantis Wildlife Films. The film won a Golden Tripod Award. She took part in David Attenborough's The Trials of Life (1988-1989) as a consultant and researcher; filming spanned over three years. Frazier and Clyne expanded upon their first documentary, Aliens Among Us, in their 1992 documentary Webs of Intrigue. The film was conceived, researched, written and presented by Clyne and co-produced with National Geographic. It won several cinematography, educational and other awards, including an Emmy in the USA, a Panda at Wildscreen in the UK, and the Japan Wildlife Festival Grand Award in 1995. The Amazing World of Mini Beasts (1997) was another documentary conceived, researched, written and presented by Clyne, in association with Silvergrass Productions.

=== Publications ===
Books authored or co-authored by Clyne include:

- 1969 – A Guide to Australian Spiders. Their Collection and Identification. Thomas Nelson & Sons.
- 1969 – Australian Frogs. Periwinkle Books: Melbourne.
- 1970 – Australian Ground Orchids. Periwinkle Books: Melbourne.
- 1972 – Australian Rock and Tree Orchids. Periwinkle Books: Melbourne.
- 1973 – Wildflowers of New South Wales. Rigby Australia.
- 1973 – Wildflowers of the Outback. Rigby: Adelaide.
- 1973 – Australian Insect Wonders. (With Harry Frauca).
- 1976 – Australian Wildflowers. International Limited. (With Esther Stepnell and Marian Beek).
- 1978 – How to Keep Insects as Pets. Angus & Robertson.
- 1979 – The Garden Jungle. Collins: Sydney.
- 1982 – Night Animals. Methuen.
- 1982 – Birds. Methuen.
- 1982 – Frogs and Lizards. Methuen.
- 1984 – Wildlife in the Suburbs. OUP: Melbourne.
- 1984 – More Wildlife in the Suburbs. Angus & Robertson: Sydney.
- 1984 – Silkworms. Angus & Robertson.
- 1985 – Fraser Island/ Sands of Time. ABC Enterprises: Sydney. (With Felicity Baverstock).
- 1987 – The Watchers of Dar. Lilyfield Publishers, Australia. (With Nicholas Brash).
- 1988 – Densey Clyne's Wildlife of Australia. Reed.
- 1989 – Rainforest. A Journey into Nature's Richest Garden (with Jim Frazier).
- 1990 – How to Attract Butterflies to Your Garden. Reed Books: Balgowlah.
- 1992 – Cicada Sing-Song. (Small Worlds series). Allen & Unwin.
- 1993 – Catch Me If You Can! Allen & Unwin.
- 1994 – Flutter By, Butterfly. Allen & Unwin.
- 1994 – Growing Roses. Kangaroo Press. (With Valerie Swane).
- 1995 – Spotlight on Spiders. (Small Worlds series). Allen & Unwin.
- 1995 – It's a Frog's Life! (Small Worlds series). Allen & Unwin.
- 1998 – Plants of Prey. (Nature Close-Ups series). Gareth Stevens Publishing.
- 1998 – The Best of Wildlife in the Suburbs. OUP: Melbourne.
- 2001 – Australian Rainforests. New Holland, Australia.
- 1999 – Densey Clyne's Wildlife of Australia. New Holland.
- 2007 – Densey Clyne's Wildlife of Australia (new edition). New Holland.
- 2009 – The Secret Lives of Caterpillars. New Holland.
- 2010 – All About Ants. New Holland.
- 2011 – Attracting Butterflies to your Garden. New Holland.
- 2018 – My Encounters with Minibeasts. New Holland.

== Honours and awards ==
Densey Clyne was a Fellow of the Royal Entomological Society of London. For her contributions to arachnology, Clyne had two new species of spider named for her: Austrarchaea clyneae and Ozicrypta clyneae.

Year	Award	Awarding body	For	Ref
1976	Hasselblad Masters Award	Hasselblad	Stills photography	
1977	Individual Achievement Award	TV Society of Australia	Best Documentary Director, Garden Jungle	
1979	Whitley Award	Royal Zoological Society of New South Wales	Commendation, Garden Jungle	
1979	C. J. Dennis Natural History Literature Award	Fellowship of Australian Writers	Garden Jungle	
1982	C. J. Dennis Natural History Literature Award	Fellowship of Australian Writers	Wildlife in the Suburbs	
1982	Whitley Award	Royal Zoological Society of New South Wales	Best Children's Series, Nature City	
1993	Whitley Award	Royal Zoological Society of New South Wales	Best Children's Series, Small Worlds	
1993	Whitley Award	Royal Zoological Society of New South Wales	Commendation - Best Children's Series, Small Worlds	
1995	Earthwatch Award	National Geographic Society	Webs of Intrigue	
1996	Environmental Award	Wilderness Society	Small Worlds	
1996	Award for Excellence	Australian Geographic Society		
1996	Conservation Award	Australian Geographic Society		
1999	Photographer of the Year	Australian Geographic Society		
2010	Whitley Award	Royal Zoological Society of New South Wales	Best Children's Series, All About Ants and Secret Life of Butterflies	
