= Pamela Ruskin =

Australian freelance journalist (1920–2010)

- Pamela Ruskin (1966)
- Born: Pamela June Zimbler; June 8, 1920; Hampstead, England
- Died: May 20, 2010 (aged 89); Melbourne, Australia
- Resting place: Melbourne Chevra kadisha
- Education: University of Melbourne
- Occupations: journalist, author
- Spouse: Alfred Ruskin
- Children: 4
- Writing career
- Years active: 1945–2000
- Notable works: Ruskin, Pamela (1989). Invitation to the dance: the story of the Australian Ballet School. Sydney: Collins. ISBN 9780732200794. OCLC 1190872721.
- Notable awards: 1968 Walkley Award (Print) - Best Story Published in an Australian Magazine; 1969 Walkley Award (Print) Best Story Published in an Australian Magazine

Pamela Ruskin (8 June 1920 – 20 May 2010) was an Australian freelance journalist with a special interest in the arts.

== Early life and education ==
Born Pamela June Zimbler at Hampstead in London, she was the only daughter of Dolly (née Goldhill) and Samuel. Her mother Dolly died 11 June 1979. Her father was a furrier who had migrated with his family to Melbourne when she was a child of six, and conducted business until the mid-1950s in Flinders Lane, the centre of Melbourne's 'rag trade'. Educated at the non-denominational St Catherine's School, Toorak, she completed an Arts degree at the University of Melbourne. During World War II and living at 45 Bruce Street, Toorak, she served in the Royal Australian Navy decoding section, and in 1940 met Jewish refugee from Berlin, Alfred Ruskin who had been studying medicine at Berlin University, but was forced to leave during Nazi purges. He had migrated in 1938 and joined the Army to become a naturalised Australian. They were married in St Kilda at the Temple Beth Israel on 27 July 1944, and Alfred went on to become a printer, publisher and patron of the arts for which he received the Order of Australia in 1986.

== Journalist ==
The couple had four children, but motherhood did not prevent Pamela flourishing in journalism. In 1946 her story The Man on the Mast was broadcast on radio by the Australian Broadcasting Commission. In 1951 for The Argus she wrote an exposé of the state-run children's hostels. From 1952 until 1984 she wrote on various subjects for Melbourne's The Age, contributed a regular stamp column to The Argus newspaper, and collaborated on radio plays with Morris West before he became a best-selling author.

During 1954 she and Caroline Isaacson partnered in a writers' agency 'Features,' from 11 Monomeath Ave., Toorak, advertising in The Journalist. She was a freelance contributor to magazines including Walkabout, for which she wrote over 30 articles between 1963 and 1978; Dance Australia Magazine; Theatre Australia; and 24 Hours.

For 25 years she wrote a weekly column 'Roundabout' in The Australian Jewish News, which was frequently controversial, and also a column 'Stairway To The Stars.' Her articles included frequent book reviews including a series of them that were an advertising feature in The Age for Margareta Webber Booksellers, and for the same newspaper she penned a series of articles on South African authors, incorporating interviews.

=== Interviewees ===
The depth of Ruskin's research for her articles is notable; her Walkabout magazine tribute to Arthur Upfield for example, is the first in a 2012 collection of essays on the Australian author. According to Ken Scarlett, her 1966 book on Karl Duldig, for which Eric Westbrook wrote the introduction was at the time and until the 1980s one of very few monographs devoted to Australian sculptors.

She interviewed at length a number of significant figures for her writings including Zelman Cowan, poet Dimitris Tsaloumas, book designer and illustrator Alison Forbes, actor Barry Humphries, TV presenter Don Lane, production designer John Truscott, authors June Drummond and Ruth Rendell, young artist and curator-to-be Ron Radford, dancers Garth Welch and Robert Helpmann, conductor Helen Quach, and soprano Joan Carden.

She received Walkley Awards; one in 1968 for her story in Walkabout on the anthropologist Baldwin Spencer and his adoption as one of their people by the Arrernte, and in 1969 for another Walkabout article, on the Victorian ballet school. Ruskin was a guest lecturer at the January 1975 Journalism Summer School conducted by Patrick Tennison at the YMCA National College in Albert Road, South Melbourne.

=== Personality ===
A poem ‘Blue Stocking Blues’ that she wrote aged 26 for Pertinent magazine on the romantic fate of bright women typifies Ruskin's strong personality, sharp intelligence and strong views, among which were to be a distaste for judges who gave light sentences, and football, a love of dogs, an interest in stamps, and a belief that euthanasia should be legalised. Samuel Abrahams describes her as 'indefatigable.'

When the Freedom to Read Association held its first meeting in the Melbourne Town Hall in 1964 she was one of five speakers giving a critical appraisal of books which were banned in Australia; The Bulletin reported that "Mrs Ruskin is a mother of four who combines housekeeping with an active career in journalism. She considered Lolita as a genuine love story, despite the hero's unpleasant form of sexual deviation."

In 1979 she defended against objections by Morris Lurie of her choice, as one of two judges, of Sir John Kerr as joint winner of the Fellowship of Australian Writers of the A$500 Con Weickhardt Award for biography, autobiography or memoir; she called Lurie's protest "an outrageous attitude taking his political views where they have no place," stressing that though she couldn't abide Kerr as a public figure and voted for Gough Whitlam in 1975, they had unanimously awarded the book the prize on its literary merit.

== Later career and legacy ==
As a regular reviewer of ballet, opera and theatre Ruskin consequently became a judge of the Green Room Awards that recognise and reward talent in the various sectors of the arts. She held that position well into her eighties and was made a Life Member in 1996. Ruskin continued to practise her profession into the new century.

She died of heart failure on 20 May 2010, aged 89, at her home in Toorak, survived by her children, Sally, Jeremy, Richard and Nick, nine grandchildren and one great-granddaughter. She is buried at Melbourne Chevra Kadisha.

Pamela and her husband Alfred were supporters of the Melba Opera Trust where he served as Chairman of Council from 1972 to 1996, the perpetual Alfred Ruskin Memorial Award being established in his name. He was also a member of the Australian Ballet Foundation Board.

== Book publications ==
- Ruskin, Pamela; Duldig, Karl (1966). Sculpture; Vienna, Singapore, Melbourne. Melbourne: Cheshire. OCLC 9695188.
- Ruskin, Pamela (1973). Golden stamp book of Australian postage stamps. Golden Press. OCLC 223168149.
- Ruskin, Pamela (1989). Invitation to the dance: the story of the Australian Ballet School. Sydney: Collins. ISBN 9780732200794. OCLC 1190872721.
- Kees., De Hoog (2012). Investigating Arthur Upfield: A Centenary Collection of Critical Essays. Cambridge Scholars Publishing. OCLC 940890073.

== Awards ==
- 1968 Walkley Award (Print) - Best Story Published in an Australian Magazine, 'Baldwin Spencer: Arunta Tribesman', Walkabout
- 1969 Walkley Award (Print) Best Story Published in an Australian Magazine, 'School for Ballet', Walkabout
