= Jim Frazier (inventor) =

Australian cinematographer (1940–2022)

Jim Frazier OAM ACS
- Born: James Albert Frazier; 26 November 1940; Armidale, New South Wales, Australia
- Died: 17 September 2022 (aged 81); Taree, New South Wales, Australia
- Occupations: Inventor, naturalist, cinematographer
- Known for: Frazier lens

James Frazier OAM ACS DSc.(Hons) (26 November 1940 – 17 September 2022) was an Australian inventor, naturalist and cinematographer who invented the Frazier lens. He won many Australian and international awards for his work, including an Academy Award for Technical Achievement and an Emmy Award. He is known for filming documentaries for David Attenborough together with his long-time collaborator Australian naturalist, photographer and writer Densey Clyne.

Clyne and Frazier formed a partnership known as Mantis Wildlife Films and their work including Webs of Intrigue, has won numerous international awards including an Emmy.

Films

For a 1971 feature The Australian Ark, Clyne was asked by producers Robert Raymond and Vincent Serventy to film her garden insects in macro as part of the Shell's Australia documentary series on Australia's natural heritage. Frazier, who was present at the meeting, offered to help; their first attempt at cinematography, based on her research into insect behaviour, was so successful that the team was commissioned to complete one entire programme for the series. This was the start of a 28-year filming partnership between Clyne and Frazier.[17] In 1975, Clyne researched and wrote, and Frazier filmed two documentaries, Aliens Among Us and Garden Jungle, about the insects and spiders in her garden. These were sold first in Australia to the national 0–10 TV network and subsequently to the BBC in Britain and to networks in Germany, Holland, USA (Garden Jungle), Japan and Middle Eastern countries.[19] Awards included the Australian Television Society's Golden Penguin.[25]

In the mid-1970s, they produced four 20-minute educational documentary shorts: Come Into My Parlour Said the Spider... (1975),[26] Now You See Me Now You Don't (1977), Blueprint for Survival (1977)[27][28] and Every Care But No Responsibility (1977).[citation needed] This was followed by Butterfly Farming in Papua New Guinea in 1978, which was a 10-minute film made for the ABC's Weekend Magazine. The short was researched and scripted by Clyne.[citation needed] In 1979, Clyne and Frazier were chosen as one of ten teams to work on David Attenborough's documentary series Life on Earth. Clyne did the research and wrote the script for their segments.[3][16] Notably, they were able to capture footage of a kowari giving birth, which had previously never been observed.[29] The same year, they worked with producers Dione Gilmour and Peter Bale to film the BBC/ABC documentary Encounter Underground about bulldog ants.[30] In 1980, they worked on Gippsland (ABC);[citation needed] on Lady of the Spiders (BBC/ABC) in 1981;[31][32] and on Funnelweb (Forest Homes Films) in 1982.[citation needed]

Their partnership with Attenborough continued when they were commissioned by the BBC[citation needed] in 1983 as one of several filming teams to contribute to three BBC television series, The Living Planet, by Sir David Attenborough. They filmed sequences for these series in Borneo, Penang, West Sumatra and California, and were responsible for advising, researching and filming several Australian subjects, notably invertebrate animals.[3][16][4] That year, their work was the subject of the ABC film Thrill of the Chase.[33] Kinchega National Park, another ABC production, followed.[citation needed] In 1984, a one-hour BBC documentary about moths, Desire of the Moth,[7][27] was released; it was conceived and written by Densey Clyne and filmed by Frazier.[24][34] In 1985, The Sands of Time, a piece on Frazier Island, was produced by Yowie Films, written by Clyne and filmed by Frazier.[35][24] Later that year was The Nature of Australia, a series of six one-hour documentaries for TV by ABC about the evolution of Australia's fauna.[36]

In 1986, Clyne conceived, wrote,[24] and directed[citation needed] To Be a Butterfly,[24] an Oxford Scientific Films/Anglia TV documentary on tropical butterflies.[citation needed] She also participated in Jamie Robertson's Sounds Like Australia, for which she filmed and recorded the sound of wildlife as part of Mantis Wildlife Films.[37] The film won a Golden Tripod Award.[citation needed] She took part in David Attenborough's The Trials of Life (1988-1989)[3] as a consultant and researcher;[citation needed] filming spanned over three years.[38] Frazier and Clyne expanded upon their first documentary, Aliens Among Us,[citation needed] in their 1992 documentary Webs of Intrigue.[4] The film was conceived, researched, written and presented by Clyne and co-produced with National Geographic.[18][39][24] It won several cinematography, educational and other awards, including an Emmy in the USA,[18] a Panda at Wildscreen in the UK,[40] and the Japan Wildlife Festival Grand Award in 1995.[citation needed] The Amazing World of Mini Beasts (1997) was another documentary conceived, researched, written and presented by Clyne, in association with Silvergrass Productions.[41][4][24] David Attenborough asked the pair to work on his series Life on Earth, The Living Planet and The Trials of Life. Frazier and Clyne contributed 55 minutes of footage to Life on Earth.

Frazier's career as a wildlife cinematographer spread over more than 40 years, with an Emmy, 3 Golden Tripods, a US Industrial Film & Video Gold Camera Award, an Honorary Science Doctorate and over 40 national and international awards for his work that include the acclaimed Cane Toads: An Unnatural History.

Frazier was awarded the Medal of the Order of Australia in the 1995 Queen's Birthday Honours List for "service to wildlife cinematography".

He was winner of a Technical Oscar in 1997 for his invention of the Frazier lens System, which has revolutionised the international film industry, an ingenious lens that provides an extended depth of field and an ability to have both the foreground and background in focus. The lens has been used by leading filmmakers including Steven Spielberg, James Cameron and in television commercials. In October 1998, Jim was presented with the John Grierson International Gold Medal for pioneering work in micro/macro cinematography of invertebrate animals leading to the design of the Frazier lens System.

Frazier also worked on a lens that promised to have a similar impact, being simpler and needing much less light. He also designed and tested 3D capture using a single lens.

He also created crystal artworks, that were developed through the growth and manipulation of crystals on glass plates. The crystals are shaped with the use of sound tones, energy fields and heat to make brilliant compositions and captured by special photographic techniques. They are featured in private collections around the world including those of Oprah Winfrey and Hillary Clinton.

Frazier died on 17 September 2022, at the age of 81.
