= Ozicrypta clyneae =

Scientific classification
- Kingdom: Animalia
- Phylum: Arthropoda
- Subphylum: Chelicerata
- Class: Arachnida
- Order: Araneae
- Infraorder: Mygalomorphae
- Family: Barychelidae
- Genus: Ozicrypta
- Species: O. clyneae

Binomial name
- Ozicrypta clyneae Raven & Churchill, 1994

Species of spider

Ozicrypta clyneae is a species of mygalomorph spider in the Barychelidae family. It is endemic to Australia. It was described in 1994 by Australian arachnologists Robert Raven and Tracey Churchill. The specific epithet clyneae honours Australian author, film-maker and arachnologist Densey Clyne, for contributions to natural history documentation.

== Distribution and habitat ==
The species occurs in the Mackay Region of eastern Queensland in rainforest and vine thicket habitats. The type locality is Finch Hatton.
