= John Raymond Garrett =

- Born: 12 November 1940 (age 85); Melbourne, Australia
- Education: BA (Photography), RMIT University
- Occupations: Photographer and Lecturer
- Website: http://www.john-garrett.co.uk

John Raymond Garrett (born 12 November 1940) is an Australian/British photo journalist whose work is mainly on fashion, reportage and photojournalism. He has covered situations and exhibited widely and is the author of many books.

== Early life and education ==
Garrett was born and raised in the suburb of Kew, Victoria, near Melbourne. After completing his secondary education He attended the RMIT University where he gained a BA in photography.

== Chronology ==
After leaving university Garrett began working for Henry Talbot, Helmut Newton photographic studio in Melbourne as a fashion photographer and worked on a number of advertising campaigns one of which included the Australian Wool Board. His street photographs of the Collins Street neighbourhood of the studio were published in Walkabout, and his pictures also featured in the Pacific Islands Monthly, and The Bulletin. After moving to England in the 1960s he worked for major fashion magazines, advertising accounts and newspapers. In later years Garrett branched into photojournalism and portrait work which involved a number of famous celebrities and politicians. He has exhibited widely and is the author of many books including The 35mm Photographer's Handbook which has sold more than 2 million copies to date. Garrett has also moved into directing, with more than 30 television commercials to his name. In 2009 Garrett moved to the United States to begin lecturing photography at university level.

=== 1966 - 1970 ===
Garrett moved to London in 1966 and worked as a fashion and advertising executive for fashion magazines, advertising accounts and newspapers.

=== 1970s ===
In 1970 he started a reportage career by illustrating John Pilger's assignments for the Daily Mirror. Pilger was a foreign correspondent at The Times and The Mirror. Many of the stories were political. He covered the Indo-Pakistan war in 1971 for Paris Match, then continued under contract to them for most of the 1970s, with commissions in Northern Ireland and throughout Britain. Other stories covered were:

- Poverty in Britain
- The Berlin Wall
- Apartheid demonstrations
- Enoch Powell's election campaign

All pictures were in black and white.

=== 1980s ===
Garrett shot colour supplements for a number of newspapers including The Observer Magazine, Express Magazine, Telegraph Magazine and the Sunday Times Magazine. Garrett continued to work in advertising and also moved into directing with more than thirty different television commercials to his name whilst he also began to write several photographic teaching books.

=== 1990s ===
In 1991 he spent six months shooting the making of a new ballet from day one of rehearsals to the opening night. Garrett reverted to black & white photography and again worked in collaborating on many stories with Pilger. He also wrote several more books and conducted teaching workshops.

=== 2000 – to date ===
Garrett has worked on further photo journalistic assignments, including Israel/Palestine conflict. Garrett is currently working on a retrospective book of portraits from 1965 until now which is to include portraits from war to film stars .

== Photographic books ==
Title	ISBN	Date Published
The Travelling Photographer's Handbook	ISBN 978-0-330-28948-1	September 1985
Fielding's Traveler's Photography Handbook	ISBN 978-0-688-04219-6	October 1985
The Handbook of Child Photography	ISBN 978-0-330-29530-7	October 1986
Art of Black and White Photography	ISBN 978-0-85533-761-2	May 1990
The 35mm Photographer's Handbook	ISBN 978-0-330-31626-2	September 1990
John Garrett's Black and White Photography Masterclass	ISBN 978-0-8174-4044-2	December 2000
KISS Guide to Photography	ISBN 978-0-7513-4869-9	January 2004
Mastering Black and White Photography: A Unique Case Study Approach to Achieving Professional Results	ISBN 978-1-84533-069-9	August 2005
Collins Complete Photography Course	ISBN 978-0-00-727992-0	September 2008
