= Peter Clyne =

Australian writer and lawyer

Peter Leopold Clyne
- Born: 24 April 1927; Vienna, Austria
- Died: 10 October 1987 (aged 60); Sydney
- Education: University of Sydney
- Occupations: Lawyer, businessman, tax consultant, author
- Spouse: Densey Clyne

Peter Leopold Clyne (24 April 1927 – 10 October 1987) was an Austrian-Australian lawyer, businessman, tax consultant and author. He was dedicated to avoiding taxes and assisted others to do the same. He wrote 21 books, mainly on the subject of tax avoidance. He was involved in numerous court actions and was convicted in the United States and Australia for false statements, and placed into bankruptcy twice in Australia.

== Personal life ==
Clyne was born in Vienna on 24 April 1927, and was aged 11 when Nazi Germany occupied Vienna as part of the annexation of Austria. His father, as a monarchist, had to flee. Near the end of his life he stated that he had been challenging authority ever since this experience. He was an Australian citizen. He was married to Densey Clyne and had no children. For 20 years he lived part of each year in the Sebel Town House in Elizabeth Bay, Sydney, and part of year at Hotel Sacher in Vienna, except when court orders prevented it. Suffering from diabetes and obesity, he died of a heart attack in a Sydney hospital on 10 October 1987, aged 60.

== Legal career ==
Clyne graduated in law from the University of Sydney in 1944 with a maximum pass. He practiced as a barrister in the New South Wales Bar Association On 8 December 1959 he was disbarred for his conduct of a case, for using his client as an "instrument of blackmail." His appeal was dismissed on 21 June 1960. He subsequently made several unsuccessful attempts to gain readmission to the bar.

== Politics ==
Clyne ran as an independent for the New South Wales state parliament seat of Bligh in 1968. He failed to win the seat, receiving 630 votes out of 21671 cast (3.01%). During his campaign he had advertised for "10 beautiful girls" to form a brigade to bring his message to the voters.

In 1987 he offered to become a candidate for the Federal Lower House for Joh Bjelke-Petersen.

Clyne advocated a flat tax. He claimed that people didn't avoid paying tax in Switzerland because they saw their flat tax as being fair and equitable.

== Eviction service ==
In 1969, Clyne was operating a professional eviction service in Sydney. Under the Landlord and Tenant Act, rents had been capped to protect tenants from a housing shortage during World War II and the years following. However, in 1954, new tenancies were no longer granted protection, and by the 1960s, the protected rents were well below market values. In 1964, provisions were added to the legislation allowing the rents to be increased for well-off tenants. Clyne, in acting for landlords, believed that he could arrange the eviction of any tenant, regardless of income, using a number of different grounds.

== Zambia and first bankruptcy ==
In September 1971 Clyne took up a magistrate post in Zambia. In December 1971, bankruptcy proceedings began against him in Australia. Clyne paid the debt of the petitioning creditor and defended the case by claiming in an affidavit that he had sufficient funds to cover his remaining debts as the fell due. In 1972, while still in the post in Zambia, he was declared bankrupt in a court hearing in Sydney.

== United States and New Zealand ==
On 19 February 1976, Clyne was arrested in Dallas, Texas, on a charge of preparing a false document for the owner of a Dallas theatrical agency. The document was alleged to have falsely stated that Clyne had made a loan to the owner. An undercover tax agent had noted Clyne's activity in the US as a self-styled international expert on avoiding taxes and had posed as a pornography dealer to get close to him. In April he was sentenced for tax fraud to a maximum three years' jail, but was given bail pending an appeal. With lawyers working on proceedings to increase his bail amount, he left the US illegally. Although his passport had been confiscated, he travelled to Canada and obtained a "limited travel document" in Vancouver which permitted him to travel to Australia via Fiji and New Zealand.

In New Zealand, he became involved in a bid to buy the Chateau Commodore chain of hotels. The New Zealand Prime Minister, Rob Muldoon, noted Clyne's presence and suggested that the Investment Commission would have to obtain assurances that the "international financier" could live up to his promises of raising millions of dollars. The Australian High Commission in Wellington subsequently refused to issue him a duplicate passport, and said the travel document had been issued by mistake. Asked about a return to the US, he said "Who would want to go back there?" The offence was not extraditable.

== Tax consultant ==
Clyne was already battling taxation in 1957.

He held seminars to present his tax avoiding ideas to a paying audience, such as a "tax rebels congress" held in Sydney on 28 August 1982.

In June 1985, Clyne appeared in court on a charge of inciting members of the public to avoid tax. It was alleged that during a radio program he had advised a caller to instruct an accountant to prepare false books and to base their tax return on them.

== Mr Asia ==
In June 1983, Clyne appeared in court as a prosecution witness to a drug smuggling case in the Magistrates Court. Clyne had been given an indemnity against prosecution. Clyne described how he devised a plan to help Daryl Sorby, a Queensland property developer who was alleged to be a member of the Mr Asia drug smuggling ring. Sorby had approached him in May 1979, with a need to launder some gold that he had smuggled from New Zealand to Australia. Clyne offered to arrange sham documents describing a loan from a bank in Vienna, which would allow Sorby to explain the money. Clyne claimed not to be aware that Sorby was involved in drug dealing.

== Second bankruptcy ==
At a hearing of the Taxation Board of Review on 13 September 1982, Clyne appealed tax office claims of $1,158,412.58 for the years 1976–1981. He said he had paid only the 58 cents. Clyne's main argument was that the whole of his income belonged to Warlock Investments of Liechtenstein. He claimed that although Warlock may have been theoretically taxable, it could not be reached. Additionally, he claimed that many of his expenses, such as opera tickets, roses, horsedrawn carriages, champagne and "mink coats for attractive blonds" were tax deductible as they related to building up his "Viennese-flavored flamboyant image", which was used to create publicity and attract clients.

Clyne was declared bankrupt in September 1983 and ordered to pay 25% of his gross income to the trustee of his estate. He was allowed to continue his work as a tax consultant.

On 15 April 1986 the Federal Court ratified a "peace treaty" in which $260,000 from Clyne's assets in Liechtenstein would be surrendered to the trustee of his estate.

== Vienna apartment ==
In January 1981, Clyne wrote to the Reserve Bank of Australia from Austria, applying to transfer about $95,000 out of Australia on the grounds that he had entered a contract to purchase an apartment in Vienna. The Reserve Bank approved the request, but required that he send them a copy of the receipt confirming the purchase as soon as it was available, which Clyne did in a letter of 7 June 1981.

Clyne was subsequently prosecuted for making a false statement to the Reserve Bank, namely the copy of the receipt. The prosecution case was that during his bankruptcy proceedings on 7 December 1982, Clyne admitted that he had never owned an apartment in Vienna. Further evidence was given that the person who supplied the receipt had never owned the apartment. The prosecution also pointed out that one of Clyne's publications, New Tax Dodger's Dictionary, had suggested pretending to buy real estate in Austria and then cancel it, as a way to get larger sums on money out of Australia.

Clyne was found guilty on 2 October 1984, and was fined $90,000. On 23 July 1985, Clyne won a reduction of the fine from $90,000 to $10,000 at the Court of Criminal Appeal, but the conviction was upheld. On 4 June 1986, Clyne lost a High Court appeal against the $10,000 fine.

== Publications ==
Clyne published 21 books, mainly on the subject of tax avoidance:

- Rent control in NSW: (the beginning of the end?): a summary of the Landlord and Tenant (Amendment) Act 1968 (1969)
- Adventures in tax avoidance: (with 120 practical tax hints) (1969)
- Practical guide to tenancy law (1970)
- How not to pay any taxes (1970)
- The law of meetings (1971)
- Guilty but insane: Anglo-American attitudes to insanity and criminal guilt (1973)
- How to use tax havens (1973)
- An anatomy of skyjacking (1973)
- How not to pay your debts: a handbook for scoundrels? (1973)
- Tax free fringe benefits (1975)
- New horizons in tax avoidance (with 236 practical tax hints) (1976)
- Incentives, rewards and tax-free benefits for executives (1977)
- These are the facts!! (1978)
- How to survive a financial crisis: and then make more money than ever! (1979)
- The new techniques of tax avoidance (1979)
- How not to pay any taxes: a handbook for tax rebels (1979)
- New adventures in tax avoidance (1980)
- Peter Clyne's Tax dodgers' dictionary, or, How to out-bluff, out-hassle and out-litigate the fiscal fiend from A to Z (1980)
- Outlaw among lawyers: the Peter Clyne story (1981)
- How to reduce your next tax bill to twenty cents in the dollar (1982)
- How to handle a tax dispute (1987)
