= Henry George Lamond =

Australian writer (1885–1969)

Henry George Lamond MBE (13 June 1885 – 12 July 1969) was an Australian farmer and writer, notable for his novels about the land, people and animals of outback Queensland. In addition to his fiction and non-fiction books, he wrote over 900 essays and articles for magazines including Walkabout. At one point in his career he was considered to be the Australian 'Thompson Seton'.

== Biography ==
Lamond was born on 13 June 1885, at Carl Creek Native Police barracks in Queensland's Gulf Country and educated at Brisbane Grammar School and the Queensland Agricultural College, Gatton. He was the son of Native Police inspector James Lamond, who conducted multiple massacres of Aboriginal people in the Gulf Country.

From 1902 to 1927, he worked at jobs ranging from jackaroo to horse-breaker to manager on various properties in western Queensland. On 27 June 1910, Lamond married Eileen Meta Olive McMillan at Maneroo Station, about 40 miles (64 km) from Longreach. The couple had a daughter and two sons (one of whom, Hal, was killed in 1942 while serving with the Royal Australian Air Force).

From 1927 to 1937, he leased the Molle Islands in the Whitsunday Group near Proserpine, Queensland, farmed on South Molle Island and established a mail service to the mainland. In 1937, he moved to a farm at Lindum, Brisbane. He had been writing short stories and magazine articles since the 1920s, but from the 1930s he was increasingly supporting himself and his family through his writing. His work was popular not only in Australia but also in Britain and the United States.

By 1949, Lamond was living at Annerley, Brisbane. He was awarded a Member of the British Empire in 1968. Lamond died in Brisbane, surviving his wife by a year, and was cremated.

== Bibliography ==
Books written by Lamond include:

- 1931 – Horns and Hooves: handling stock in Australia. Country Life: London.
- 1934 – An Aviary on the Plains. Angus & Robertson: Sydney.
- 1934 – Tooth and Talon: tales of the Australian wild. Angus & Robertson: Sydney.
- 1937 – Amathea: the story of a horse. Angus & Robertson: Sydney.
- 1943 – Kilgour's Mare. W. Morrow & Co: New York.
- 1943 – Grand old man of the pastoral industry. The story of pastoralist William Ross Munro.
- 1945 – Dingo: the story of an outlaw. W. Morrow & Co: New York.
- 1946 – Brindle Royalist: a story of the Australian plains. W. Morrow & Co: New York.
- 1949 – White Ears the Outlaw: the Story of a Dingo. Angus & Robertson: Sydney. Originally a newspaper serial in April 1934.
- 1953 – Kangaroo. J. Day Co: New York.
- 1953 – Big Red. Sun Books: Melbourne.
- 1954 – The Manx Star: a story of the Australian plains. Faber & Faber: London.
- 1955 – Towser. The Sheep Dog. Faber & Faber: London.
- 1958 – The Red Ruin Mare. Faber & Faber: London.
- 1959 – Sheep Station. Faber & Faber: London.
- 1966 – Etiquette of Battle. Lansdowne Press: Melbourne.
