= Max Quanchi =

Australian scholar (born 1945)

- Born: 20 June 1945 (age 81); Victoria, Australia
- Occupation: Academic

Academic background
- Education: Monash University (MA)

Max Quanchi (born 20 June 1945) is an Australian academic whose research specialisations have been the South Pacific nations and the role of photography in recording and transmitting its cultures and histories.

== Biography ==
Quanchi was born in Victoria on 20 June 1945, third and youngest son to parents Grace and Harry, who moved the family through a series of country towns. He completed High School at Wonthaggi, in South Gippsland. He qualified as a primary teacher and taught a year in a one-teacher remote rural school. Conscripted into National Service, he spent 1966‐1967 in Wewak, Papua New Guinea in the 2PIR Moem Barracks. His five "Nasho Chalkie" (National servicemen/teacher) companions remained close friends and collaborated later on a memoir. Moem Barracks were significant in housing a battalion newly recruited in PNG's expansion of its army during preparations for self-government and independence.

== Education ==
Quanchi undertook an Honours and MA degree in History at Monash University and subsequently lecturing at universities in Melbourne, Brisbane, Suva in Fiji, and at the University of Papua New Guinea. For his PhD he researched the history of photography in PNG.

== Research ==
Quanchi embarked on research into the history of Gippsland in the early 1980s, publishing books on the subject, but by 1983 had turned his attention to the Pacific region. He has visited PNG regularly over more than forty years to conduct History Teacher workshops, and was a Guest Speaker for P&O Cruises. He concentrated his academic research to focus on Pacific Islands history and the history of photography. Since 1996 he has convened sessions on photography at Pacific History Association conferences, and for AAAPS (Association for the Advancement of Pacific Studies in Australia, now AAPS) for which he was its first secretary.

Quanchi has written and published frequently in his specialised field of research, notably his 2007 monograph Photographing Papua: Representation, Colonial Encounters and Imaging in the Public Domain focused on the colonial frontier in Papua New Guinea. His contribution of articles on photography appear in The Oxford Companion to the Photograph (2005), Berg Encyclopaedia of Fashion and Dress (2009), Coast to Coast (2010) and in the journals History of Photography, History Focus, Pacific Arts, Journal of Pacific Studies, Agora, Australian Historical Studies, Journal of Australian Studies and Journal of Pacific History. He is on the editorial board of the latter and also of the Journal of New Zealand and Pacific Studies, for which he has been guest editor for special issues of several.

== Reception ==
Miriam Kahn of the University of Washington in her review of Quanchi's Postcards from Oceania as "accessible," and "a clear and concise text that is highly descriptive in nature," noting that "There is a wealth of scholarly literature about Oceania and colonialism but very little exists that focuses specifically on postcards and their important link to colonialism," though in a separate review, noting Quanchi and Shekleton's extensive bibliography on the subject, Jacqueline Leckie indicates that Quanchi has been in the vanguard of what is now a "a shift within Pacific history towards centring the visual (including postcards) as a valuable and insightful source."

Carol E. Mayer of the University of British Columbia in reviewing his major work Photographing Papua: representation, colonial encounters and imaging in the public domain introduces as an

"idea fundamental to his work; that late-19th and early-20th century photography in the area known as Papua was the product of the convergence of three phenomena: new technology (the camera), new science (anthropology) and the arrival of an entourage of Europeans (missionaries, traders, government officials, travellers). Quanchi's theoretical underpinnings are dispersed in origin, and he admits to assembling his analysis from a range of academic methodologies and approaches. It can certainly be argued that, historically, anthropology as a discipline paid little attention to the value of photography as an analytical tool."

Mitchell Rolls in Travelling Home, Walkabout Magazine and Mid-Twentieth-Century Australia frequently cites as valuable Quanchi's prior research into articles on, and images of, Papua New Guinea in Walkabout, though contesting Quanchi's assertion that "Walkabout with its heavily illustrated, topical, mass circulation was read by many Australians, who often ignored the text and merely passed the time skipping through the photographs".

== Contributions in education ==
From 1995‐2001 Quanchi devised and presented a regional Professional Development Program for teachers (TTPF), and over 2011‐2015 led the Moana Project, a regional research network. He introduced and taught the first BA degree course on "Australia and the Pacific" at QUT from 1990 to 2009.

== Public speaking ==
Quanchi has contributed to discussions on ABC radio and as an expert consultant; appeared in video presentations; presented at museums; has been a speaker at the Sydney Ideas Festival in 2014; on WWI Memorials in the Pacific at the University of the South Pacific/French Embassy symposia in 2015; and as a commentator and reviewer.

He is now retired and lives in Brisbane.

== Publications ==
=== Books ===
- Quanchi, Max; Shekleton, Max (2019). An ideal colony and epitome of progress: colonial Fiji in picture postcards. USP Press. ISBN 978-982-01-0991-9. OCLC 1112066060.
- Quanchi, Max; Shekleton, Max (2015). Postcards from Oceania: port towns, portraits and the picturesque during the colonial era. University of the South Pacific Press. ISBN 978-982-01-0941-4. OCLC 933221647.
- Quanchi, Max; Robson, John (2009). A to Z of the discovery and exploration of the Pacific Islands. Lanham (Md.): The scarecrow Press. ISBN 978-0-8108-6830-4. OCLC 762487123.
- Quanchi, Max (2009). Photographing Papua: Representation, Colonial Encounters and Imaging in the Public Domain. Cambridge Scholars. ISBN 978-1-4438-0674-9. OCLC 953859692.
- Quanchi, Max; Robson, John (2009). Historical dictionary of the discovery and exploration of the Pacific islands. Lanham, MD: Scarecrow Press. ISBN 978-0-8108-6528-0. OCLC 731152107.
- Quanchi, Max (2004). Culture contact in the Pacific: essays on contact, encounter and response. Cambridge: Cambridge University Press. ISBN 978-0-521-42284-0. OCLC 611641726.
- Quanchi, Max (2003). Atlas of the Pacific islands. Milton: Bess Press. ISBN 978-0-7016-3662-3. OCLC 612318376.
- Quanchi, Max; So'o, Asofou; Council of Presidents of Pacific Island History Associations (2003). Teaching history: a guide for teachers teaching history for the first time. Brisbane: Council of Presidents of Pacific Island History Associations. OCLC 225921975.
- Quanchi, Max; Gideon, Branson; Pacific Islands Museum Association; Council of Presidents of Pacific Island History Associations (2003). Pacific history, museums and cultural centres: a guide for history teachers. Brisbane: Council of Presidents of Pacific Island History Associations. OCLC 225921970.
- Quanchi, Max (2000). Australia and the Pacific Islands: a bibliography. Brisbane, Qld.: Queensland University of Technology. OCLC 225653777.
- Quanchi, Max (1997). Imaging, representation, and photography of the Pacific Islands. Laie, Hawaii: Brigham Young Univ. OCLC 836923801.
- Queensland; Department of Education; Australian Agency for International Development (1997). Australian South Sea Islanders: a curriculum resource for secondary schools. Australia: Education Queensland [and] Australian Agency for International Development. ISBN 978-0-642-22074-5. OCLC 40871590.
- Quanchi, Max (1996). Photography, representation and cross-cultural encounters: seeking reality in Papua 1880-1930 (Thesis). OCLC 639288615.
- Quanchi, Max; Talu, Alaima, eds. (1995). Messy entanglements: the papers of the 10th Pacific History Association Conference. Brisbane: Pacific History Association. OCLC 953053499.
- Donnelly, T. A; Kerr, G. J. A; Quanchi, Max (1994). Fiji in the Pacific: a history and geography of Fiji. Milton, Qld.: Jacaranda. ISBN 978-0-7016-3261-8. OCLC 36173616.
- Quanchi, Max (1992). Pacific People and Change. Cambridge, England; New York: Cambridge University Press. ISBN 978-0-521-37627-3. OCLC 503444152.
- Quanchi, Max; Peake, Martin; Fahey, Stephanie; Duggan, Stephen (1991). The Pacific in the 20th century. Cambridge; New York: Cambridge University Press. ISBN 978-0-521-37627-3. OCLC 33140913.
- Fahey, Stephanie; Peake, Martin; Quanchi, Max; Victoria; Ministry of Education; Victoria; Peace Education Resource Centre (1989). The South Pacific: contemporary issues, peace and development. Melbourne, Vic.: Ministry of Education, Victoria. OCLC 220986112.
- Drake, Dennis; Quanchi, Max; Vestris, Averil (1989). Australia in view: studies in work, culture, and society. Milton, Qld: Jacaranda Press. ISBN 978-0-7016-2564-1. OCLC 22542734.
- Quanchi, Max; Stewart, Rosalie (1985). Angus McMillan, Paul Strzelecki: trailblazers of Gippsland. Warragul: Education Centre. OCLC 221506459.
- Quanchi, Max (1983). Australia and the southwest Pacific: a guide for teachers. Canberra: Pacific History Association. OCLC 21617227.
- Quanchi, Max; Stewart, Rosalie (1980). Angus McMillan. Warragul, Vic.: Education Centre. OCLC 221495962.
- Quanchi, Max; Stewart, Rosalie (1980). Where are the towns. Warragul [Vic.: Community Education Centre. OCLC 221417819.

=== Book chapters ===
- Quanchi, Max (2019). "Melanesia: A region and a history". In Hirsch, Eric; Rollason, Will (eds.). The Melanesian World. S.l.: Routledge. pp. 63–76. doi:10.4324/9781315529691. ISBN 978-0-367-73067-3. OCLC 1201654799. S2CID 242568927.
- Quanchi, Max (2017). "Tropicalisation and representation in Oceania: or a path into the deep, dark jungle". In Stevenson, Karen (ed.). Trading traditions: the role of art in the Pacific's expansive exchange networks. USP Press. ISBN 978-982-01-0970-4. OCLC 1041852986.
- Quanchi, Max (2016). "Nauru". In Levine, Stephen I (ed.). Pacific ways: government and politics in the Pacific Islands. Victoria University Press. ISBN 978-1-77656-068-4. OCLC 937708105.
- Quanchi, Max (2015). "Thomas McMahon's Pacific neighbours; an early Australian photojournalist". In Maxwell, Anne; Croci, Josephine (eds.). Shifting focus: colonial Australian photography 1850-1920. Australian Scholarly. pp. 218–229. ISBN 978-1-925003-72-7. OCLC 920656765.
- Quanchi, Max (2014). "Geschichte der fotografie der Pazifischen Inseln". In Köpke, Wulf; Schmelz, Bernd (eds.). Blick ins Paradies: historische Fotografien aus Polynesien [A glimpse into paradise: historical photographs of Polynesia]. Museum für Völkerkunde. pp. 67–86. ISBN 978-3-944193-01-4. OCLC 880188365.
- Quanchi, Max (2011). "Towards a single visual history of New Zealand". In Wanhalla, Angela; Wolf, Erika (eds.). Early New Zealand photography: images and essays. Dunedin, N.Z.: Otago University Press. pp. 166–167. ISBN 978-1-877578-16-8. OCLC 767566414.
- Quanchi, Max (2010). "Merl La Voy: an American photographer in the South Seas". In Prue Ahrens; Chris Dixon (eds.). Coast to Coast: Case Histories of Modern Pacific Crossings. Cambridge Scholars. pp. 117–137. ISBN 978-1-5275-5331-6. OCLC 1203554119.
- Quanchi, Max (2010). "Photographic Representations of Pacific Peoples". In Eicher, Joanne B (ed.). Berg encyclopedia of world dress and fashion. Vol. 10. New York: Berg. pp. 243–251. ISBN 978-1-84788-399-5. OCLC 964017742.
- Quanchi, Max (2010). "It's our turn to give orders: Walkabout's view of a nation in the making". Living History and Evolving Democracy. University of Papua New Guinea. pp. 110–116. OCLC 1160110126.
- Quanchi, Max (2007). "Hunting the collectors". In Cochrane, Susan; Quanchi, Max (eds.). Hunting the Collectors: Pacific Collections in Australian Museums, Art Galleries and Archives. Newcastle upon Tyne, UK: Gardners Books Ltd. pp. 1–16. ISBN 978-1-84718-084-1. OCLC 780488958.

=== Journal articles ===
- Quanchi, Max (2021). ""Fijian Islanders preparing for a feast" (1959): The Influence of Photography on Popular Opinions of the Pacific". Pacific Arts. 21. eScholarship, University of California. doi:10.5070/PC221155084. OCLC 1277075852. S2CID 244884906.
- Quanchi, Max (2020). Review of 'Tulagi: Pacific Outpost of British Empire' by Clive Moore. Journal of New Zealand & Pacific Studies, 8 (1), 127-129. doi: 10.1386/nzps_00027_5
- Quanchi, Max (2018). "Bearing Witness: Essays in Honour of Brij V. Lal". The Journal of Pacific History the Journal of Pacific History. 53 (4): 527–529. doi:10.1080/00223344.2018.1542653. ISSN 0022-3344. OCLC 7929213395. S2CID 165372066.
- Quanchi, Max (2017). Review of No. 1 Neighbour; Art in Papua New Guinea 1966-2016. Journal of Pacific History, 52 (4), 530-532.
- Quanchi, Max (2016). Review of 'The Pacific War: aftermath, remembrance and culture' Edited by Christina Twomey and Ernest Koh. Journal of New Zealand and Pacific Studies, 4 (1), 95-97.
- Quanchi, Max (2016). Review of 'Pacific futures: projects politics and interests' Edited by Will Rollason. Journal of New Zealand and Pacific Studies, 4 (1), 95-97.
- Quanchi, Max (2016). "Acknowledging Local Heroes: the Lapérouse Museum in Albi, France". The Journal of Pacific History the Journal of Pacific History. 51 (1): 48–51. doi:10.1080/00223344.2015.1120910. ISSN 0022-3344. OCLC 6029349028. S2CID 163342448.
- Quanchi, Max (2016). Review of 'World War I, Fiji and Ratu Sukuna: an exhibition' curated by Larry Thomas. The Journal of Pacific History, 51 (1), 55-56.
- Quanchi, Max (2016). "Maʻafu, Prince of Tonga, Chief of Fiji: the life and times of Fiji's first Tui Lau". Journal of Pacific History. 51 (1): 85–86. doi:10.1080/00223344.2016.1159119. ISSN 0022-3344. OCLC 8505486662. S2CID 163718328.
- "Learning-by-looking: For example, at Peoples of all Nations; European education and serial encyclopaedia". Pacific Geographies. 25 (45): 11–16. ISSN 2196-1468. OCLC 8539707569.
- Quanchi, Max (2015). Review of 'Diminishing conflicts in Asia and the Pacific: why some subside and others don't' Edited by Edward Aspinall, Robin Jeffrey and Anthony J. Regan. Journal of New Zealand and Pacific Studies, 3 (2), 221-223. doi: 10.1386/nzps.3.2.207_5
- Quanchi, Max (2015). "Imaging the USA's Pacific Empire". History of Photography History of Photography. 39 (3): 213–226. doi:10.1386/nzps.3.2.207_5. ISSN 0308-7298. OCLC 5867621018.
- Quanchi, Max (2014). Review of 'The echo of things: the lives of photographs in the Solomon Islands' by Christopher Wright. CAA Reviews, 1-3.
- Quanchi, Max (2014). "The Pacific Islands: environment and society". Journal of Pacific History. 49 (1): 127–128. doi:10.1080/00223344.2014.885174. ISSN 0022-3344. OCLC 8505463357. S2CID 161451453.
- Quanchi, Max (2014). "Norman H. Hardy: Book Illustrator and Artist". The Journal of Pacific History. 49 (2): 214–233. doi:10.1080/00223344.2014.906298. ISSN 0022-3344. OCLC 9391060525. S2CID 162608774.
- Quanchi, Max (2014). Kanaka portraits: Indentured labour in Colonial Australia. Pacific Arts, 13 (2), 33-44.
- Hawkes, Kathleen; Quanchi, Max (2013). "From the Archives: Photography Collections of the Archives of New Caledonia". The Journal of Pacific History. 48 (4): 484–493. doi:10.1080/00223344.2013.863173. ISSN 0022-3344. S2CID 162409382.
- Quanchi, Max (2013). Review of 'Light on Darkness? Missionary Photography of Africa in the Nineteenth and Early Twentieth Centuries' by T. Jack Thompson. American Historical Review, 118 (3), 976-977. doi: 10.1093/ahr/118.3.976
- Quanchi, Max (2013). Australia (not) in the Pacific. Agora, 48 (2), 28-35.
- Quanchi, Max (2013). Review of Oceania under Steam: sea transport and the cultures of colonialism c 1870-1914 by Francis Steel. South Pacific Journal of Philosophy and Culture, 11 (2010-2012), 67-68.
- Quanchi, Max (2012). Review of 'Drua: the wave of fire' Co-directed by Vilsoni Hereniko, Peter Rockford Espiritu and Igelese Ete. Journal of Pacific History, 47 (4), 519-521. doi: 10.1080/00223344.2012.730033
- QUANCHI, MAX (2011). "Pacific History — The Long View". The Journal of Pacific History. 46 (2): 251–256. doi:10.1080/00223344.2011.607274. ISSN 0022-3344. OCLC 7973571576. S2CID 162990340.
- Quanchi, M (2011). "Twelve Days at Nuku Hiva: Russian Encounters and Mutiny in the South Pacific, by Elena Govor". Contemporary Pacific. 23 (1): 258–259. doi:10.1353/cp.2011.0018. hdl:10125/22338. ISSN 1043-898X. OCLC 705983892. S2CID 162353591.
- A (Max) Quanchi (2011). "Book Review: Oceanic Encounters: Exchange, Desire and Violence". Pacificaffairs Pacific Affairs. 84 (2): 411–412. ISSN 0030-851X. OCLC 5964286469.
- Quanchi, Max (2010). Old and new histories. Agora, 45 (4), 76-81.
- Quanchi, Max (2010). The Pacific by Donald B. Freeman. The Journal of Pacific History, 45 (1), 160-161. doi: 10.1080/00223344.2010.484185
- Quanchi, Max (2010). "Book Review: Violence and Colonial Dialogue: The Australian-Pacific Indentured Labour Trade". Journal of Social History. 43 (4): 1113–1114. doi:10.1353/jsh.0.0336. ISSN 0022-4529. OCLC 5972221955.
- Quanchi, Max; Boglio, Jean-Louis (2010). ""Compelled to record my impressions": An Artist's View of the Pacific Shipping World". Pacific Arts. 9 (1): 22–29. ISSN 1018-4252.
- Quanchi, Max (2006). The imaging of Samoa in illustrated magazines and serial encyclopedias in the early 20th-century. Journal of Pacific History, 41 (2), 207-217. doi: 10.1080/00223340600826110
- Quanchi, Max (2006). "Book Review: Eye Contact: Photographing Indigenous Australians". The Journal of Pacific History. 41 (2): 261–262. doi:10.1080/00223340600826276. ISSN 0022-3344. OCLC 5544068484. S2CID 219622964.
- Quanchi, Max (2006). Visual histories and photographic evidence. Journal Of Pacific History, 41 (2), 165-173. doi: 10.1080/00223340600826052
- Quanchi, Max and Moore, Clive (2002). (Book Review)'Refined White', Queensland Museum, Brisbane, 2001-2002. Journal of Pacific History, 37 (1), 124-126.
- Quanchi, M and Moore, C (2002). (Book Review) 'Embarquement pour le Queensland, Des Loyaltiens en terre australienne', Museum of tropical Queensland, Townsville, Bibliotheque Bernheim, Noumea and Musee d'Easo, Lifou, Loyalty Islands. Journal of Pacific History, 37 (1), 124-126.
- Review of Refined White, Queensland Museum, Brisbane, regional and interstate 2001-2002; and Embarquement pour le Queensland; Des Loyaltiens en terre australienne (Across the Coral sea: Loyalty islanders in Queensland) Bibliothque Bernheim, Noumea a. Carfax. 2002. OCLC 828750278.
