= Beverley Clifford =

Australian photojournalist

Beverley Clifford was an Australian magazine photographer and photojournalist active during the 1950s-1970s.

== Career ==
Beverley Clifford produced photographs for magazines, books, government and commercial commissions and projects, much of it made on the Northern Beaches and in Sydney during her professional career. Husband Ken also worked as a medical photographer at the University of Sydney and the couple collaborated on a number of projects.

In 1991, collector Dale Egan of Warriewood discovered a trove of 4,000 lost photos of Sydney beaches made between the 1930s and the 1970s by the Cliffords.

== Critical reception ==
Clifford worked in the mid-1950s as a government typist before joining a number of women infiltrating the field of professional freelance photojournalism that had so long been the domain of men. She was sole illustrator for the 1969 coffee table book, Sydney, more than a harbor : a photographic glance at a surging city that was reviewed in by ’Scrutarius’ (journalist H. C. (Peter) Fenton) in Walkabout magazine in which he writes that while the obvious landmarks of the "bridge and the opera house, “Paddo’s” iron lacework, Bondi and Manly beaches, the post office colonnade and the tall glass boxes that, with telephoto lens treatment, constricts Pitt Street into more of a claustrophobic canyon than it really is,..." and a soccer crowd which...

Photographically...is well justified by the warmly appropriate touch of an argument erupting in the near foreground. Indeed, most of the behind-scenes pictures seem to have been selected for the human quirks they encapsulate—the fiercely vocal woman at a political meeting, the clasped couple testing Luna Park’s “love-meter”, the patience of anglers on a jetty’s timbers and of passengers sitting in front of Central’s train indicator board, the extraordinary character declaiming in the Domain. These are all quite cleverly caught in action or inaction.

Clifford contributed images for a number of other books on Australia, including Camera in Australia published in 1970, which also included work by Max Dupain, Kerry Dundas, David Moore, and Wolfgang Sievers, and I. V. Hansen's The tiger and the Rose.

== Award ==
Artiste (AFIAP) 1967.

== Magazine articles ==
- Australian Geographical Society (1 September 1964), "The Australian Scene EVERGLADES (1 September 1964)", Walkabout, 30 (9), Australian National Travel Association, ISSN 0043-0064
- Clifford, Beverley (1961), "Subiaco is No More", Walkabout, 27 (11): 26–27, ISSN 0043-0064
- Clifford, Beverley (1962), "Bahai House of Worship", Walkabout, 28 (3): 28–30, ISSN 0043-0064
- Australian Geographical Society (1 October 1963), "REVOLOTION ON THE ROCKS (1 October 1963)", Walkabout, 29 (10), Australian National Travel Association, ISSN 0043-0064
- Australian Geographical Society (1 October 1961), "Sculpture in the Gardens (1 October 1961)", Walkabout, 27 (10), Australian National Travel Association, ISSN 0043-0064
- Australian Geographical Society (1 May 1961), "The Australian Scene (1 May 1961)", Walkabout, 27 (5), Australian National Travel Association, ISSN 0043-0064
- Australian Geographical Society (1 August 1962), "FUN OF TIE FAIR (1 August 1962)", Walkabout, 28 (8), Australian National Travel Association, ISSN 0043-0064
- Australia. Fisheries Branch (1 January 1965), "PHOTO CREDITS (1 January 1965)", Australian Fisheries Newsletter, 24 (1), Dept. of Primary Industry, Fisheries Branch, ISSN 0818-7371
- Australian Geographical Society (1 August 1959), "GROWING MUSHROOMS (The Scientific Way) (1 August 1959)", Walkabout, 25 (8), Australian National Travel Association, ISSN 0043-0064
- Australian Geographical Society (1 June 1961), "The Australian Scene (1 June 1961)", Walkabout, 27 (6), Australian National Travel Association, ISSN 0043-0064
- Australian Geographical Society (1 June 1962), "MAINLY BUILDINGS (1 June 1962)", Walkabout, 28 (6), Australian National Travel Association, ISSN 0043-0064
- Australian Geographical Society (1 July 1961), "NEW LOOK FOR TWO CITIES (1 July 1961)", Walkabout, 27 (7), Australian National Travel Association, ISSN 0043-0064
- Australian Geographical Society (1 February 1964), "SOCIETY ON THE ROCKS (1 February 1964)", Walkabout, 30 (2), Australian National Travel Association, ISSN 0043-0064
- Australian Geographical Society (1 November 1962), "Walkabout (1 November 1962)", Walkabout, 28 (11), Australian National Travel Association, ISSN 0043-0064
- Australian Geographical Society (1 August 1962), "Walkabout (1 August 1962)", Walkabout, 28 (8), Australian National Travel Association, ISSN 0043-0064
- Australian Geographical Society (1 April 1959), "Camera Supplement (1 April 1959)", Walkabout, 25 (4), Australian National Travel Association, ISSN 0043-0064
- Australian Geographical Society (1 January 1961), "The Australian Scene (1 January 1961)", Walkabout, 27 (1), Australian National Travel Association, ISSN 0043-0064
- Australian Geographical Society (1 December 1963), "Walkabout (1 December 1963)", Walkabout, 29 (12), Australian National Travel Association, ISSN 0043-0064
- Australian Geographical Society (1 July 1965), "Walkabout (1 July 1965)", Walkabout, 31 (7), Australian National Travel Association, ISSN 0043-0064
- Australian Geographical Society (1 September 1964), "Walkabout (1 September 1964)", Walkabout, 30 (9), Australian National Travel Association, ISSN 0043-0064
- Archibald Memorial Fountain in Hyde Park, Sydney, Australian Geographical Society (1 January 1965), "Walkabout (1 January 1965)", Walkabout, 31 (1), Australian National Travel Association, ISSN 0043-0064
- Australian Geographical Society (1 August 1959), "IN THE FLINDERS RANGES (SOUTH AUSTRALIAN (1 August 1959)", Walkabout, 25 (8), Australian National Travel Association, ISSN 0043-0064
- Warragamba Dam Australian Geographical Society (1 October 1959), "HAWK'S-EYE-VIEW OF THE MURRAY (1 October 1959)", Walkabout, 25 (10), Australian National Travel Association, ISSN 0043-0064
- Australian Geographical Society (1 September 1962), "The Australian Scene (1 September 1962)", Walkabout, 28 (9), Australian National Travel Association, ISSN 0043-0064
- Australian Geographical Society (1 May 1959), "Camera Supplement (1 May 1959)", Walkabout, 25 (5), Australian National Travel Association, ISSN 0043-0064
- Lawrence, Don (1962), "Mecca for Golfers", Walkabout, 28 (8): 14–16, ISSN 0043-0064
- Australian Geographical Society (1 July 1961), "Living on Plateau (1 July 1961)", Walkabout, 27 (7), Australian National Travel Association, ISSN 0043-0064
- Australian Geographical Society (1 March 1959), "Camera Supplement (1 March 1959)", Walkabout, 25 (3), Australian National Travel Association, ISSN 0043-0064
- Australian Geographical Society (1 February 1964), "Deserted mining town (1 February 1964)", Walkabout, 30 (2), Australian National Travel Association, ISSN 0043-0064
- Brooksbank, Walter (1963), "Captain Cook's Landing Place", Walkabout, 29 (9): 15–17, ISSN 0043-0064

== Collections ==
- National Library of Australia
- State Library of New South Wales
