= Mark Lewis (filmmaker) =

Australian documentary filmmaker

- Occupation: Documentary filmmaker
- Years active: 1979–2010
- Notable work: Cane Toads: An Unnatural History
- Father: Tom Lewis
- Relatives: Jon Lewis
- Website: web.archive.org/web/20220628032552/http://mlrp.net/

Mark Lewis is an Australian documentary film and television producer, director and writer. He is famous for his film Cane Toads: An Unnatural History and for his body of work on animals. Unlike many other producers of nature films, his films do not attempt to document the animals in question or their behaviors but rather the complex relationships between people and society and the animals they interact with.

One of his films has earned him an Emmy Award for Outstanding Writing for a Nonfiction Program.

== Filmography ==
- (2010) Cane Toads: The Conquest
- (2007) The Pursuit of Excellence
- (2006) The Floating Brothel
- (2006) The Standard of Perfection: Show Cats
- (2006) The Standard of Perfection – Show Cattle
- (2000) The Natural History of the Chicken
- (1999) Animalicious
- (1998) Rat
- (1994) Gordy
- (1990) The Wonderful World of Dogs
- (1989) Round the Twist
- (1988) Cane Toads: An Unnatural History
