= Walkabout (magazine) =

Former Australian illustrated magazine

- During the 1960s, the magazine and masthead were given a more contemporary design, with the slogan "Australia's Way of Life Magazine"
- Frequency: Monthly
- Circulation: 46,000 (1970)
- Publisher: Australian National Travel Association
- First issue: November 1934
- Final issue Number: October 1978; Volume 41, number 1
- Country: Australia
- Based in: Melbourne
- Language: English
- ISSN: 0043-0064
- OCLC: 754555812

Walkabout was an Australian illustrated magazine published from 1934 to 1974 (and again in 1978) combining cultural, geographic, and scientific content with travel literature. Initially a travel magazine, in its forty-year run it featured a popular mix of articles by travellers, officials, residents, journalists, naturalists, anthropologists and novelists, illustrated by Australian photojournalists. Its title derived "from the supposed 'racial characteristic of the Australian Aboriginal who is always on the move'."

== History ==
Ostensibly and initially a travel and geographic magazine published by the Australian National Travel Association (ANTA), Walkabout : Australia and the South Seas was named by ANTA director Charles Holmes. In its first issue of November 1934, the editorial, signed by Charles Lloyd Jones, chair of the board of David Jones and acting chairman of ANTA, proclaimed its aim to educate its readers thus:

in publishing "Walkabout," we have embarked on an educational crusade which will enable Australians and the people of other lands to learn more of the romantic Australia that exists beyond the cities and the enchanted South Sea Islands and New Zealand.

This first issue with its cover by internationally known photographer Emil Otto Hoppé set the benchmark, with profuse illustrations by others in the articles; 'Coming Down with Cattle', by Arthur Upfield; 'Undiscovered New Guinea' by editor Charles Holmes; 'The Kimberleys' by Ion Idress, a pictorial section titled '...And The Cities' with four uncredited images; 'Tahiti To-Day' by Charles Chauvel; 'The Maori', by Eric Ramsden; with "Our Cameraman's Walkabout", a pictorial section on the 'British Solomon Islands Protectorate'.

The income the association derived from magazine sales provided for its other activities in promoting tourism, "to place Australia on the world's travel map and keep it there." It was assertively Australian in its ethos but took cues from other popular magazines of the period, such as the United States' National Geographic Magazine which served a similar audience, and Life.

=== Australian Geographical Society ===
From August 1946, Walkabout doubled as the official journal of the newly formed Australian Geographical Society, founded with a £5,000 grant from ANTA, its banner subscript reading 'Journal of the Australian Geographical Society'.

When the Society disbanded in 1961 it resumed its purpose of promoting tourism and became 'Australia's Way of Life Magazine,' supported by the Australian National Publicity Association and later the Australian Tourist Commission and advertising from shipping lines, state government tourist bureaus, tourist destinations and hotels and, later, airlines.

For the first 25 years Walkabout offices were located in the Railway Building, Flinders Street, Melbourne. From 17 October 1959, the magazine operated from 18 Collins Street, Melbourne, in the then new 12-storey Coates Building (near the corner of Collins and Spring streets), a multi-storey office building constructed in 1958–59. Still standing, it is preserved as of heritage significance. Constructed to the prevailing 40-metre (130 ft) height limit in a design by John La Gerche during the postwar building boom that transformed Melbourne into a modern high-rise city, the Coates Building is an intact early representative example. Its curtain wall street façade of horizontal rows of framed glazing and vertical mullions in a grid and materials such as aluminium distinguish its Post-War Modernist style.

== Editorship ==
Charles Holmes was Walkabout's founding managing editor, retiring in August 1957. From June 1936 he was paid £250 per annum and C.S. Weetman was appointed associate editor at £100, with their allowances coming from the magazine's income and being conditional on its profitability. Basil Atkinson was editor until January 1960; then Graham Tucker followed by film critic and photojournalist Brian McArdle (1920–1968) from January 1961. In the following financial year subscribers to Walkabout came from 91 different countries. Under a new banner 'Australia's Way of Life Magazine' (after November 1961), modern dynamic layouts in a larger format of 27 cm × 33 cm (11 in × 13 in) and more lively captioning saw a brief peak in circulation to 50,000 in 1967 in response to more liberal human-interest and cultural content. McArdle consciously emulated the American Life magazine (1936–1972) and the French Réalités (1946–1979). After McArdle's illness and death, John Ross took on the editorship in December 1969 with various others filling the role, and the magazine format was reduced to 20 cm × 27.5 cm (7.9 in × 10.8 in) until it ceased publication in 1974.

== Contributors ==
Writers included some of Australia's most significant authors, novelists, journalists, naturalists and commentators:

- Patsy Adam-Smith
- Charles Leslie Barrett
- John Béchervaise
- Robin Boyd
- Walter Brooksbank
- Wilfred Burchett
- Brian Carroll
- Charles Chauvel
- Alec H. Chisholm
- Frank Clune
- Robert Henderson Croll
- Bernard Cronin
- William John Dakin
- Eleanor Dark
- John King Davis
- Frank Dalby Davison
- James Devaney
- Henrietta Drake-Brockman
- Keith Dunstan
- Elizabeth Durack
- Mary Durack
- Hugh Edwards
- Flora Eldershaw
- E.T. Emmett
- John K. Ewers
- George Farwell
- Charles Fenner
- Desmond Fennessy
- Mary Finnin
- David Fleay
- Bruce Grant
- Dorothy Auchterlonie Green
- Arthur Groom
- Bill Harney
- Enid Moodie Heddle
- Brett Hilder
- Ernestine Hill
- Nan Hutton
- Ion Idriess
- Rex Ingamells
- Henry George Lamond
- Stan Marks
- Alan Marshall
- Ursula McConnel
- Hugh McCrae
- Alan McCulloch
- Crosbie Morrison
- Charles P. Mountford
- Walter Murdoch
- Vance Palmer
- James Pollard
- Eric Ramsden
- Tarlton Rayment
- Leslie Rees
- Violet Roche
- Colin Roderick
- Pamela Ruskin
- Vincent Serventy
- Kenneth Slessor
- Kylie Tennant
- Michael Terry
- Arthur Upfield
- Osmar White
- Eric Worrell
- Judith Wright

Western Australian writer Henrietta Drake-Brockman originated the 'Our Authors' Page', a full-page feature on a leading writer, which was given a leading position in each issue opposite the table of contents between 1950 and 1953.

A book review column ran almost continuously from 1953 to 1971 under the byline 'Scrutarius' (who was journalist H.C. (Peter) Fenton, with perhaps others), totalling almost 200 columns and which reviewed usually four books per issue. Fenton had a background as a multilingual Victorian Railways publicist. The magazine thus provided a showcase of diverse Australian literature to a mostly 'middlebrow' audience that was otherwise ill-served by other periodicals and newspapers.

== Photojournalism ==
ANTA recognised that the magazine it intended to publish would only be successful if it were well illustrated. Its 16th board meeting, held in Sydney in May 1934, passed a motion to employ a staff photographer for the purposes of improving "the quality of 'arresting pictures' that were being forwarded to overseas papers and magazines". Roy Dunstan, a Victorian Railways employee who was possibly known to the first editor Holmes, since both worked for the railways, was appointed on a salary of £9 per week with all expenses paid, increased to £10 per week from 1 September 1938. He was later joined on staff by Ray Bean from 1947 to c. 1951.

Walkabout appealed to 'middle-brow' audiences, and artists, for its pictorial content. An appearance in its pages was responsible for remote features, such as Wave Rock, becoming tourist attractions. It became an outlet for, and promoter of, Australian photojournalism through photographers, men and women, some famous, like Frank Hurley who contributed seven Walkabout articles in 1939–40, and a cover image in 1956, and others lesser-known, like Heather George, whose careers were launched in the magazine. Stories were liberally illustrated each with up to fifteen quarter-, half- and full-page photographs in black and white. Walkabout also sponsored a national artistic and aesthetic photography competition in 1957 with a One Hundred Pound first prize (a 2019 value of over $3,000).

The original pictorial segment was initially called "Our Cameraman's Walkabout", then "Australia and the South Pacific in Pictures" (briefly including New Zealand in the title), "Australia in Pictures", "Camera Supplement" and after 1961 a 24-page lift-out full-colour supplement "The Australian Scene" was included annually in the December issue which sold at a higher price. It began with as many as 23 photographs spread over 6–8 pages, but dropped to 6–10 photographs in the 1960s. The segment was often devoted to a single topic and in the 1960s to single-topic double-page spreads.

In January 1959, full-colour covers appeared, together with full-colour advertising, but photographs accompanying articles continued in black and white or sepia. In a letter to readers in October 1961, the new editor McArdle promised that the first issue he oversaw would "pictorially excel itself." Letterpress was replaced by offset printing in July 1962, so that articles could be illustrated with colour photographs from July 1965.

Significant Australian photographers included in its pages were:

- David Beal
- Ray Bean
- John Watt Beattie
- Jeff Carter and Mare Carter
- Harold Cazneaux
- Les Chandler
- Alan Chapple
- Beverley Clifford
- Gordon De Lisle
- Maggie Diaz
- Max Dupain
- Leo Duykers
- Hugh Edwards
- A. D. Edwardes
- Rennie Ellis
- Elliott Erwitt
- Claudy and Harry Frauca
- John Garrett
- Lee Geoffrey
- Heather George
- Helmut Gritscher
- Frank Hurley
- Laurence Le Guay
- Brian McArdle
- Ursula McConnel
- Robert McFarlane
- Ern McQuillan
- Harry Mercer
- Noel Monkman
- David Moore
- Lance Nelson
- Keith Phillips
- Graham Pizzey
- Axel Poignant
- Russell Roberts
- Michael Sharland
- Wolfgang Sievers
- Wesley Stacey
- Mark Strizic
- John Tanner
- Donald Thomson
- Jozef Vissel
- Edna Walling
- Richard Woldendorp

=== International photographers ===
- Emil Otto Hoppé,
- Victor Minca

== Associated book publications ==
In the 1960s the magazine spawned a number of book-length illustrated anthologies with content both new, and from the magazine issues;

- Tennison, Pat; McArdle, Brian (1962). Walkabout presents the Australian scene. Melbourne?: Walkabout. OCLC 222634434.
- Walkabout; Bolton, Alec (1964). Walkabout's Australia;. Sydney: Ure Smith in assoc. with the Australian National Travel Association [distr. San Francisco, Calif., Tri-Ocean Books. OCLC 1337946.
- Farwell, George (1966). Around Australia on Highway One. Nelson. OCLC 503168071.
- McArdle, Brian; Fenton, Peter (1968). Australian Walkabout. Melbourne: Lansdowne. OCLC 480415290.

== Representation of Indigenous Australians ==
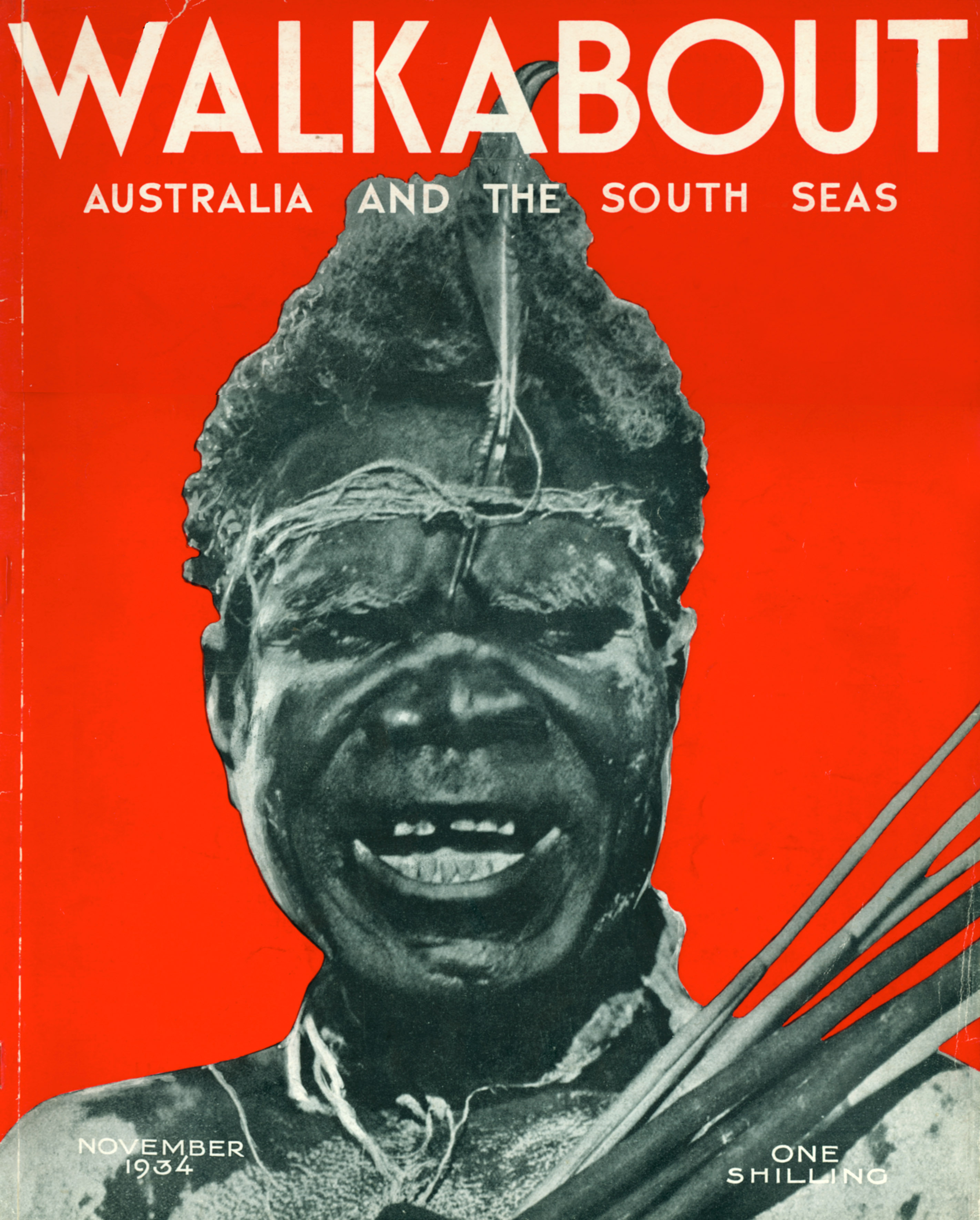
Walkabout, Vol 1, Issue 1, November 1934, cover, ‘Head of Australian Aboriginal' photo: E. O. Hoppé

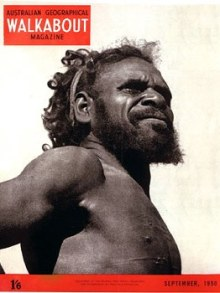
A photograph of Gwoya Jungarai, known as One Pound Jimmy, by Walkabout staff photographer Roy Dunstan, cropped from his original full-length portrait.

Aboriginal, Torres Strait, and Pacific Island cultures were central position in the portrayal of Australia that was presented to readers. The magazine now provides retrospective insights into the discussions about Australian identity and emotional connections of settler Australians to the land in the mid-20th century and how these discussions manifested in accessible media. Walkabout magazine sheds light on how white Australians navigated their relationships with the country in both physical and emotional dimensions and necessarily encompassed landscapes that held significance through Aboriginal occupation and affiliation.

The magazine's title itself evokes the traditional Australian Aboriginal practice of journeying through the land for customary, spiritual, and practical intentions. Deborah Bird Rose defines the Aboriginal notion of "country" as a dynamic entity that spans the past, present, and future, possessing awareness and a drive for life. The term "Walkabout" was recognized by early colonial settlers as a distinct form of travel linked to Aboriginal communities. However, this term was sometimes used in a derogatory manner, implying irresponsibility, especially within labour contexts. It was part of a broader discourse that presumed a "nomadic" lifestyle, strategically employed to dispute Aboriginal land claims and expedite settler land ownership.

Thus, labeling a travel magazine of the 1930s Walkabout signifies an increased interest in and a positive assessment of Aboriginal culture by certain settler Australians of that era. Nevertheless, it also raises questions about potential appropriation.

The cover image of the first issue, under the masthead Walkabout: Australia and the South Seas, was a cut-out head and shoulders photograph "Head of Australian Aboriginal", in face-paint, grinning and holding a clutch of spears, his head deep-etched against a strong red background. It was taken (on Palm Island) by German-born British photographer Emil Otto Hoppé (1878–1972) who in 1930 was commissioned to document Australia's "true spirit" and toured extensively throughout the country, including Tasmania.

Otherwise, the first edition includes no articles specifically on Aboriginal peoples but in accounting for the magazine's name, it connected the magazine with a misrepresentation of Aboriginal heritage:

The title has an 'age-old' background and signifies a racial characteristic of the Australian Aboriginal who is always on the move. And so, month by month, through the medium of pen and picture, this journal will take you on a great 'walkabout' through a new and fascinating world below the equator.

Walkabout's early to mid-century stance on the depiction of Indigenous Australians was generally conservative, patronising, romantic, often racist and stereotyped, though mixed with some informed commentary and genuine concern (misguided and otherwise), in a reflection of the then prevailing national attitudes. Most issues were inclusive of Aboriginal subjects in photo spreads, more typically of Aboriginal figures in so-called traditional poses or settings.

An instance was Roy Dunstan's full-length portrait entitled "Jimmy" of 1935, standing heroically with a spear and gazing to the distance. "Jimmy" was Gwoya Jungarai, a Walbiri man, but when his image, cropped to head and shoulders, appeared on the 1950 Australian stamp it was captioned just "Aborigine", a term many now consider an offensive and racist hangover from Australia's colonial era. Though belatedly named in an editorial essay, the deprecating moniker "One Pound Jimmy" stuck.

However stereotyped or cursory such inclusions might have been, they did promote an understanding of an enduring and significant Aboriginal presence, and of a rich cultural heritage. Specialist essays, written for a general audience, covered topics including:

- Aboriginal art,
- Aboriginal trackers,
- the peoples of the Torres Strait Islands and Groote Eylandt,
- missions,
- Aboriginal bird and place names,
- Aboriginal weapons and tools,
- poetry and ritual,
- the skills and division of labour in fishing, hunting and gathering activities,
- foodstuffs,
- Aboriginal pastoral workers, and
- sea craft.

Ion Idriess, Mary Durack and Ernestine Hill in their frequent writings for the magazine present complex and ambivalent attitudes to Aborigines. Despite their familiarity with First Nations people, they saw them as "vanishing" due to unexplained causes and agencies of which even the victims themselves were ignorant, and to an insufficient birth rate to sustain their population, explained as an instinctual "racial suicide". Conversely, regular contributor Bill Harney, cattleman, former patrol officer and protector of Indigenous groups and father of Wardaman elder Bill Yidumduma Harney, penned sixteen articles over 1947–57 presenting an experienced and sympathetic view of the Aboriginal peoples of Australia's Northern Territory alongside whom he worked and lived.

Anthropologists Ronald Berndt and Frederick McCarthy contributed learned articles, mostly on cultural artefacts. Ursula McConnel's three articles, all in successive issues during 1936 and drawn from fieldwork she had undertaken in Cape York from 1927 to 1934, provided particular insights into the impact on Aboriginal people experiencing the transition from traditional practices to mission life, frankly identifying ideological failures of policy by the missions' and government administrations and advancing several remedies to the damage she saw being caused to Aboriginal lives and cultures by "civilisation". Early articles by anthropologist Donald Thomson were based on his fieldwork in Cape York, northeast Arnhem Land and the Great Sandy Desert, and from 1949 he also contributed a series of 'Nature Diaries' on Australian flora and fauna, but he also expressed passionate advocacy for indigenous people out of his frustration with how they were treated and general contempt for them as little but savages, and his sympathy and deep respect for them and their cultures, writing that he "felt that [he] had more in common with these splendid and virile natives than with my own people".

The magazine reviewed more enlightened literature as early as 1952, including poet Roland Robinson's studies of traditional Aboriginal knowledge Legend and Dreaming as related to Roland Robinson by Men of the Djauan, Rimberunga, Mungarai-Ngalarkan and Yungmun Tribes of Arnhem Land (1952, with a foreword by A. P. Elkin) and children's literature dealing with Indigenous subjects, such as Rex Ingamells's Aranda Boy (1952), the latter being praised for its readability and its politics in showing "that the Australian Aboriginal is not merely a 'native'.". In the column "Our Authors" James Devaney's popular historical novel The Vanished Tribes (1929), is described as "the first really successful treatment in creative prose of our Aboriginal theme, but it is as vitally human and beautifully written a book as we possess".

By the sixties outrage in the Australian community at the injustice of apartheid in South Africa and consciousness of other social movements for civil rights changed attitudes to the Indigenous population. An instance in Walkabout is an account of the experience of their making I, the Aboriginal, a first-person film biography of Waipuldanya, contributed in September 1963 by author and Indigenous advocate Sandra Le Brun Holmes, wife of its director Cecil Holmes, who also wrote for the magazine.

The change in societal opinion eased the passing of the 1967 Referendum which was to override prejudicial state laws and open the way to advances in land rights, easing of discriminatory practices, financial assistance, and conscious preservation of cultural heritage. Despite the complexities of the Referendum, it received scant, and post-facto, mention in Walkabout in 1967. Patsy Adam Smith wrote hopefully that:

The most notable manifestation of change was the recent emphatic "yes" to the recent referendum, that gave the green light to removing all constitutional discrimination against [Aboriginal peoples ...]. Parliament, with all-party support, had already extended the franchise to them, and the Commonwealth Conciliation and Arbitration Commission had delivered an historic judgment that, in three years, will equalise the pay of white and Aboriginal workers in the pastoral industry.

In an essay in the June 1968 issue, author Margaret Ford asks:

Does the idea of "citizenship" in the Aboriginal mind overstress the right to unrestricted drinking? And, as a result, is the citizen [Aboriginal ...] deteriorating extensively, retarding his assimilation into the general community, delaying, perhaps forfeiting, his cultural passage over 12,000 years into the 20th century, getting himself into goal, while his family is in rags?

The following July "Publishers Column" promoted the idea that;

It will do well also to give prominence to the positive and successful side of Aboriginal advancement. Its current issue indeed points up South Australian legislation to remove Aboriginal disabilities and the greater interest shown in Aboriginal language study by Adelaide University. These are steps towards the fuller mutual confidence and towards breaking down the racial fence in recognition of one Australian people, that should be widely known.

Articles from this period more even-handedly acknowledged the colonial massacres alongside more sympathetic, though still somewhat patronising, stories on the remote desert tribes, and more in-depth and academic discussion of the complex issues appeared, though much ink was devoted to debate over whether 'aborigine', 'Aborigine', or 'Aboriginal' were correct English usage, the first two of which are now considered by many as offensive and racist.

Writing about Walkabout's treatment of Australian indigenous people in their 2016 text, Mitchell Rolls and Anna Johnston conclude;

...it is in the manifest tensions between and within the various articles discussing Aborigines and their affairs, and those overtly critical of Aboriginal policy, that Walkabout's contribution to Aboriginal representation and issues is best found. It is here where one finds the grist for a better and more empathic understanding of these contested and complex issues. In this way[...] "Walkabout" was doing 'something immensely valuable'.

== Circulation ==
Walkabout magazine sales data
Date	Copies	Domestic Subscribers	Overseas Subscribers	Price per copy	Annual Subscription
1934, November	20,000			one shilling	
1935, January	22,000				
1936	27,000				
1942	24,250				
1947, April	28,000	6,247	1,156	1/6d (1st price rise)	18 shillings
1959	34,481				
1958	30,000				
1959	34,481			2/6d	
1960	36,000				
1961	38,800				
1962	42,600				
1963	51,520				
1964	-			30 cents	
1965, December	65,000				
1966	46,908				
1970	46,000			40 cents	
1971	-			50 cents	

== Cessation ==
In February 1971, ANTA subcontracted out production of the magazine to Sungravure Pty Ltd (a part of Fairfax Magazines, one of Australia's largest publishing companies). The cover price was raised substantially from 40 cents to 50 cents a copy (a rise from $4.29 to $5.36 in 2019 values), but failed to turn a profit. In August, it claimed to be 'The New Walkabout', but the magazine was floundering, frequently changing its subtitle and editorship. In February 1972, editions moved from academic style volume numbering to commonplace month-year labels.

Quanchi in the Journal of Australian Studies observes that the magazine "struggled against mass circulation weekly and lifestyle magazines in the early 1970s," and publication ceased with the June/July 1974 issue. It restarted again in August 1978 as volume 41, number 1, continuing for two more monthly issues. This run was published by "Leisure Boating and Speedway Magazines Pty Ltd" on behalf of ANTA.

While Walkabout outlived LIFE by two years, both magazines – amongst many others – finally succumbed to increasing publication costs, decreasing subscriptions, and to competition from other media and newspaper supplements.

== Successors ==
An Australian edition of Geo magazine was founded in 1979 by Paul Hamlyn Pty Ltd. It was subsequently published until 2001.

Dick Smith founded the Australian Geographic magazine and Australian Geographic Society in 1986. The latter was established as a wholly owned subsidiary of the magazine and has no connection to the earlier Australian Geographical Society or to Walkabout. The magazine and society have continued to operate under a variety of owners.

Also in 1986, the bimonthly The Living Australia Magazine was begun by Bay Books. It ceased in 1987. A The Living Australia serial periodical was later produced by Bay Books that ran for many undated editions.

The R.M. Williams Outback magazine was launched in September 1998 to celebrate the Australian outback, and continues to be published.

Australian Traveller magazine was founded in 2005 to "inspire Australians to see their own country". In February 2019, ANTA's successor Tourism Australia collaborated with Australian Traveller to launch a new magazine in the United States, called Australia. Jane Whitehead, regional general manager Americas, Tourism Australia, said at its launch that "In collaborating with Australian Traveller, we set out to tell quintessentially Aussie travel stories, while highlighting some of the finest hospitality product, in a way that compels travellers to book memorable vacations." The magazine is distributed gratis at major US airports.

== Bibliography ==
- Bolton, A. T. (ed.) WALKABOUT'S Australia: an anthology of articles and photographs from Walkabout magazine. Sydney: Ure Smith, 1964 ISBN T000019430
- McGuire, M. E. (1993), 'Whiteman's walkabout', Meanjin, [52:3]:517–525.
- Rolls, Mitchell (2009), "Picture imperfect: re-reading imagery of Aborigines in Walkabout", Journal of Australian Studies, (33:1): 19–35
- Rolls, M. (2010). "Reading Walkabout in the 1930s", Australian Studies, 2.
- Rolls, Mitchell & Johnston, Anna, 1972-, (co-author.) (2016). Travelling home, Walkabout magazine and mid-twentieth-century Australia, London; New York: Anthem Press
- Russell, Lynette (1994), "Going Walkabout in the 1950s: images of 'traditional' Aboriginal Australia [in Walkabout magazine.]", Bulletin (Olive Pink Society), 6 (1): 4–8, ISSN 1037-0730
