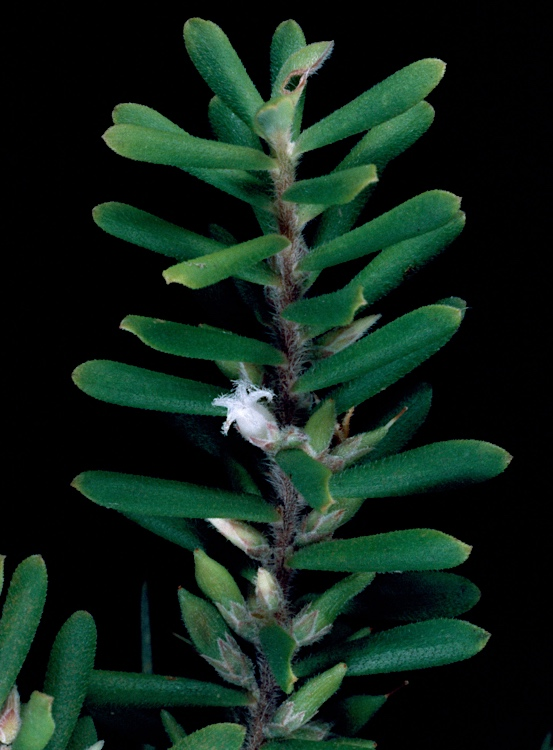
- In the North Coast Regional Botanic Garden

Scientific classification
- Kingdom: Plantae
- Clade: Tracheophytes
- Clade: Angiosperms
- Clade: Eudicots
- Clade: Asterids
- Order: Ericales
- Family: Ericaceae
- Genus: Styphelia
- Species: S. margarodes

Binomial name
- Styphelia margarodes R.Br. (Spreng.]]
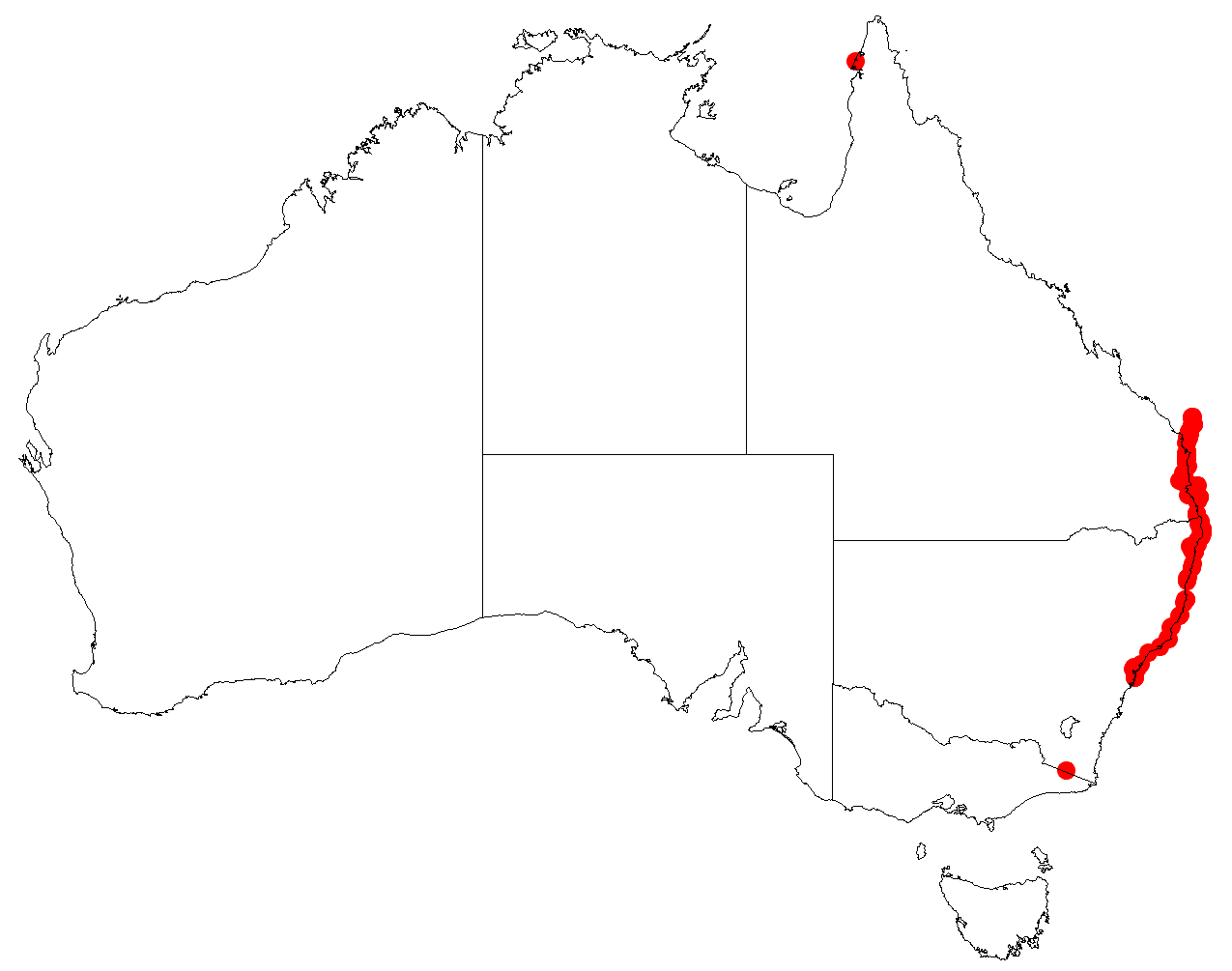
- Occurrence data from AVH

Synonyms
- Leucopogon margarodes R.Br.

= Styphelia margarodes =

Species of shrub

Styphelia margarodes is a species of flowering plant in the heath family Ericaceae and is endemic to near-coastal areas of eastern Australia. It is an erect, spreading shrub with egg-shaped leaves with the narrower end towards the base, and small numbers of white, tube-shaped flowers usually arranged singly or in pairs in upper leaf axils.

== Description ==
Styphelia margarodes is an erect, spreading shrub that typically grows to a height of 0.7–3 m (2 ft 4 in – 9 ft 10 in), and has bristly branchlets. The leaves are egg-shaped leaves with the narrower end towards the base, or oblong, 6.1–11.2 mm (0.24–0.44 in) long and 1.2–2.5 mm (0.047–0.098 in) wide on a petiole about 0.4 mm (0.016 in) long. The leaves are covered with bristly hairs, edges of the leaves are rolled under and have fine teeth. The flowers are few in number and arranged singly or in pairs in leaf axils with bracteoles 1.0–1.3 mm (0.039–0.051 in) long at the base. The sepals are 1.5–1.9 mm (0.059–0.075 in) long, the petals joined at the base to form a tube 1.15–1.3 mm (0.045–0.051 in) long with lobes 1.3–2.5 mm (0.051–0.098 in) long. Flowering mainly occurs from September to February and the fruit is a more or less glabrous, oval drupe 3–4 mm (0.12–0.16 in) long.

== Taxonomy ==
This species was first formally described in 1810 by Robert Brown in his Prodromus Florae Novae Hollandiae et Insulae Van Diemen. In 1824, Kurt Polycarp Joachim Sprengel transferred the species to the genus Styphelia as S. margarodes in his Systema Vegetabilium.

== Distribution and habitat ==
This styphelia grows in coastal heath, forest and woodland in near-coastal areas from south-eastern Queensland to as far south as Wondabyne in New South Wales.
