= Frazier lens =

Special camera lens

A Frazier Lens on a RED One camera

The Frazier lens is a special camera lens designed by Australian photographer Jim Frazier. The Frazier lens provides an appearance of a massive depth of field, allowing the foreground and background of an image to be in focus. Frazier's lenses have been widely used in Hollywood and wildlife cinematography, most notably within David Attenborough's Planet Earth series. In addition to its unique depth of field properties, the Frazier lens is significantly smaller than previous deep-focus lenses, allowing more versatility and flexibility to cinematographers. The main feature of the lens, an extended tube with a rotating prism, allows cinematographers to place the camera in a variety of positions for a given shot. Cinematographers then rotate the prism to correct the horizon. This feature allows directors and camera operators to achieve shots in minutes that previously took cinematographers hours in rigging and designing special sets to accommodate shooting positions.

== Patent claims ==
A United States patent US 5727236 was issued on 10 March 1998 for the lens and the Academy of Motion Picture Arts and Sciences awarded a Technical Achievement Award to Frazier for his lenses. The patent was licensed to Panavision for production and marketing of the lens. In 2003, Panavision and Frazier brought a suit against Roessel Cine Photo Tech, Inc. for violating the patent.

At the trial, it was discovered that the 60-minute Panavision educational video that the Frazier lawyers had submitted ("in the interests of demonstrating to the Examiner the features and uniqueness of the optical system of this patent application") had eight seconds of a shot that had been created with a different lens. Although Frazier reshot the footage in question with the Frazier Panavision lens the patent was declared unenforceable for inequitable conduct and attorney's fees were awarded to the defendants.
