= Nan Hutton =

Australian woman journalist

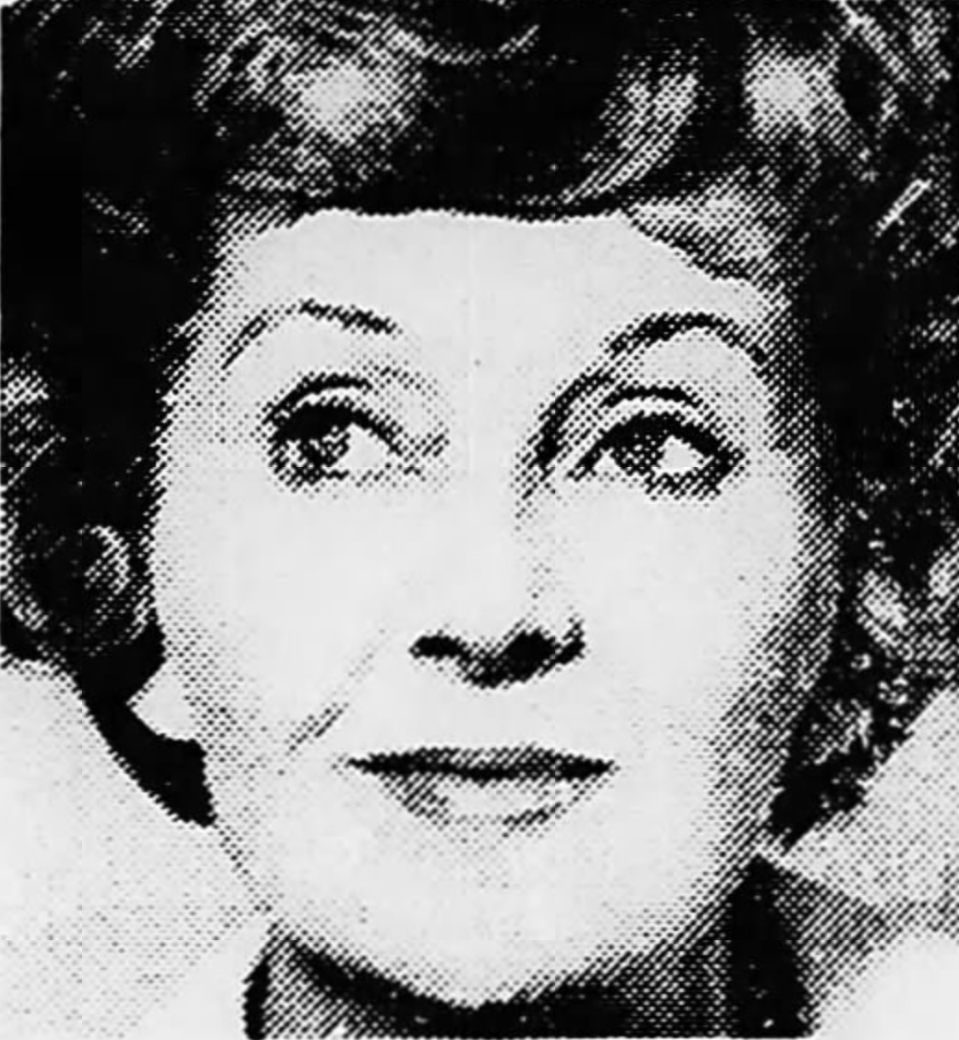
- Nan Hutton
- Born: Nancy Estelle Charlholmes; 2 October 1917; Malvern East, Victoria, Australia
- Died: 2 May 1984 (aged 66); Melbourne, Victoria, Australia
- Resting place: Springvale, Victoria
- Occupations: Journalist, columnist, writer
- Spouse: Geoffrey
- Children: Kristin, Barbara
- Writing career
- Years active: 1940s–1970s
- Notable works: Founding member of Melbourne Press Club, 'Nan Hutton on Thursdays column in The Age

Nan Hutton (2 October 1917 – 2 May 1984) was a feminist Australian journalist for several magazines, for three Melbourne metropolitan newspapers, and was a book editor for Australian publishers.

== Biography ==
Born Nancy Estelle Charlholmes, Nan''s debut into journalism was at nine years old in her collaboration with her sister on a news sheet which they sold to neighbours for lollies. During the Second World War she wrote for United States forces based in Melbourne and Brisbane, then postwar in Europe for Radio Australia she was a scriptwriter and broadcaster, and compered 'Mainly for Women' on ABC television in the 1960s. She married Henry Richard Nicholls, son of the Sir Herbert Nicholls, Chief Justice of Tasmania Mercury, in 1946, but they divorced.

== Professional journalism ==
Returning to Australia, Nan married Geoffrey Hutton, a fellow journalist, on 17 March 1952 at South Yarra Presbyterian Church. She was appointed as a feature writer and columnist for The Argus then from 1952 to 1958 produced a personal advice column under the name 'Mary Friend' for Woman's Day In other journalism, she continued freelancing for other magazines including Vogue, and Walkabout.

== Feminism ==
In a 1953 issue of Women's Day Hutton protests the housewife's burden; "the homemaker's complaint"; "the heroine of [her] housekeeping manual"; a creature of "grim perfection." Of the Royal Tour of 1954 she commented that "the Queen possibly heard before she came here that Australia is considered a "man's country." If she did not, I should think that when she is going home on the Gothic, thinking back to her days in Australia, she will come to that conclusion herself." Hutton was interviewed on her ideas on ABC radio in 1956.

In the 1960s she was assigned an eponymous column in Walkabout, then in 1967 she commenced her column 'Nan Hutton on Thursdays' in The Age which continued for a run of 13 years. A women's activist, she advocated in her column for equal pay and in 1954 wrote that:

"today's woman can often support herself as well as a man, and divorce carries little stigma. She faces her husband on an equal footing, and if he is too unreasonable, she can pack up and leave"

She critiqued the 'expert' advice pronouncing on women's issues of the time, suggesting that experience instead was the best teacher:

"What with the cookery experts and the beauty specialists and the child psychologists and the panels sitting in judgement on television, I’m afraid we are the most thoroughly advised community that ever existed [...] There are lots of people telling you how to keep your man ... “Never let him see you in curlers”, “Take an interest in his work”, “Relax and be yourself”, “Don’t become a doormat”. It all sounds plausible, but unless you’re a mental acrobat you can’t do all of these things. Take your pick."

In an obituary, Age editor Creighton Burns, described her as a talented and distinguished journalist. [Her] influential column in this newspaper of years […] was both perceptive and compassionate."

== Professional associations ==
Hutton and her family lived in Kew and she was a council member of the National Gallery of Victoria Women's Association, a member of the Lyceum Club, and served on the Women's Advisory Committee of the Australian Broadcasting Commission She was a founding member, one of only two women, of the Melbourne Press Club.

Hutton died of cancer on 2 May 1984 aged 67, and was cremated at Springvale. She was survived by her husband Geoffrey, then 74 but who died in December the following year, and their daughters Kristin and Barbara. Geoffrey and Barbara Hutton were both writers for The Age.
