= Mount Walsh National Park =

National park in Australia

- IUCN category II (national park)
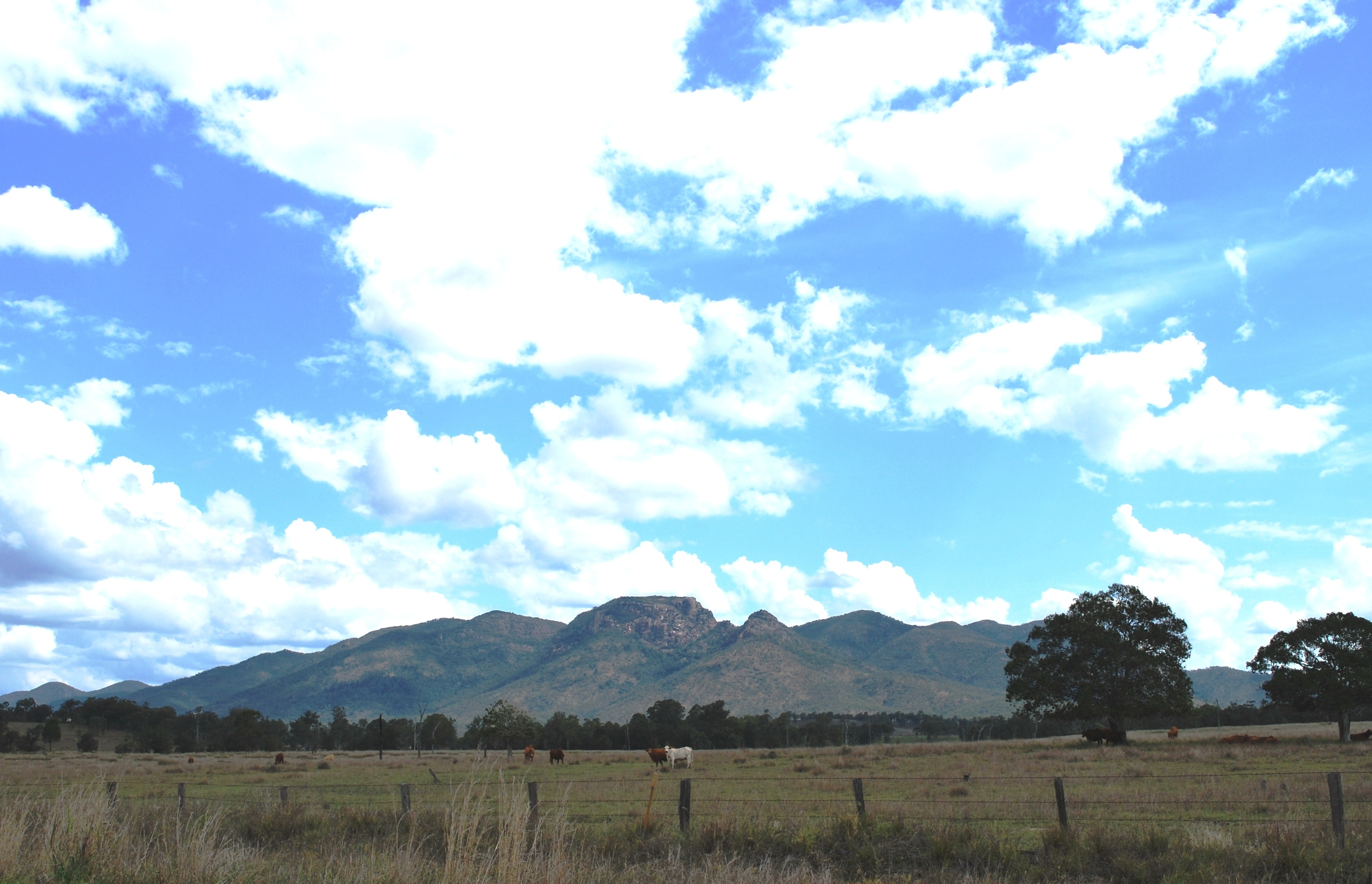
- Mount Walsh

- Location within Queensland
- Location: Queensland
- Nearest city: Biggenden, Queensland
- Coordinates: 25°35′52″S 152°03′07″E
- Area: 52.40 km^{2} (20.23 sq mi)
- Established: 1947
- Governing body: Queensland Parks and Wildlife Service
- Website: Official website

Mount Walsh is a national park in Queensland, Australia, 230 kilometres (140 mi) northwest of Brisbane.

A prominent landmark in the Biggenden region is the granite bluff area of Mount Walsh which rises to 703 metres (2,306 ft) above sea level in the northern part of park. The summit has three peaks. Exposed granite outcrops, rugged ridges and steep forested slopes support a range of vegetation.

The "Bluff" area of Mount Walsh is located at the park's northern end and is a prominent landmark of the Biggenden area. The park features sheltered gullies, rugged ridge lines with mountain areas with spectacular exposed granite outcrops and cliffs support a diversity of vegetation. Such diversity gives a home to many endangered animal species such as the powerful owl and grey goshawk. Visitors may also see peregrine falcons, dingoes, wallabies, eastern grey kangaroos and lace monitors.

A complex landscape has led to diverse vegetation communities which includes heath, shrubland, woodland, open forest and dry forest. There are patches of hoop pines in some gullies.

== Geology ==
The geological history of the mountain began in the late Triassic period about 215 million years ago. Violent explosions emanated from a volcanic structure referred to as the Mungore Centre. Two large bodies of magma rose close to the surface where Mount Malarga and Mount Walsh are presently situated. Erosion has left the cliffs, buffs, gorges rocky pavements and tors seen today.

== Facilities ==
Picnic and barbecue facilities are available. Bush camping is allowed in the park. No facilities are provided so visitors must be totally self-sufficient.

=== Walking tracks ===
A 300-metre (980 ft) trail from the picnic area leads visitors through open eucalypt forest to a rocky creek gully fringed in rain forest, then on to lookouts over surrounding countryside. Experienced walkers can take the strenuous (unmarked) two and a half hour hike to Mount Walsh's bare granite summit.

== See also ==
- Protected areas of Queensland
