= List of Barychelidae species =

This page lists all described species of the spider family Barychelidae accepted by the World Spider Catalog as of February 2021:

== A ==
=== Ammonius ===
Ammonius Thorell, 1899

- A. pupulus Thorell, 1899 (type) — Cameroon

=== Atrophothele ===
Atrophothele Pocock, 1903

- A. socotrana Pocock, 1903 (type) — Yemen (Socotra)

=== Aurecocrypta ===
Aurecocrypta Raven, 1994

- A. katersi Raven, 1994 — Australia (Western Australia)
- A. lugubris Raven, 1994 (type) — Australia (Western Australia)

== B ==
=== Barycheloides ===
Barycheloides Raven, 1994

- B. alluviophilus Raven, 1994 (type) — New Caledonia
- B. chiropterus Raven, 1994 — New Caledonia
- B. concavus Raven, 1994 — New Caledonia
- B. rouxi (Berland, 1924) — New Caledonia
- B. rufofemoratus Raven, 1994 — New Caledonia

=== Barychelus ===
Barychelus Simon, 1889

- B. badius Simon, 1889 (type) — New Caledonia
- B. complexus Raven, 1994 — New Caledonia

== C ==
=== Cosmopelma ===
Cosmopelma Simon, 1889

- C. ceplac Mori & Bertani, 2016 — Brazil
- C. decoratum Simon, 1889 (type) — Brazil

=== Cyphonisia ===
Cyphonisia Simon, 1889

- C. affinitata Strand, 1907 — East Africa
- C. annulata Benoit, 1966 — Ghana
- C. itombwensis Benoit, 1966 — Congo
- C. kissi (Benoit, 1966) — Congo
- C. maculata (Roewer, 1953) — Congo
- C. maculipes Strand, 1906 — Cameroon
- C. manicata Simon, 1907 — Equatorial Guinea (Bioko)
- C. nesiotes Simon, 1907 — São Tomé and Príncipe
- C. nigella (Simon, 1889) — Congo
- C. obesa Simon, 1889 (type) — West, Central Africa
- C. rastellata Strand, 1907 — East Africa
- C. soleata Thorell, 1899 — Cameroon
- C. straba Benoit, 1966 — Congo

== D ==
=== Diplothele ===
Diplothele O. Pickard-Cambridge, 1891

- D. gravelyi Siliwal, Molur & Raven, 2009 — India
- D. halyi Simon, 1892 — Sri Lanka
- D. tenebrosus Siliwal, Molur & Raven, 2009 — India
- D. walshi O. Pickard-Cambridge, 1891 (type) — India

== E ==
=== Encyocrypta ===
Encyocrypta Simon, 1889

- E. abelardi Raven, 1994 — New Caledonia
- E. aureco Raven & Churchill, 1991 — New Caledonia
- E. berlandi Raven & Churchill, 1991 — New Caledonia
- E. bertini Raven, 1994 — New Caledonia
- E. bouleti Raven, 1994 — New Caledonia
- E. cagou Raven & Churchill, 1991 — New Caledonia
- E. colemani Raven & Churchill, 1991 — New Caledonia
- E. decooki Raven & Churchill, 1991 — New Caledonia
- E. djiaouma Raven & Churchill, 1991 — New Caledonia
- E. eneseff Raven & Churchill, 1991 — New Caledonia
- E. gracilibulba Raven, 1994 — New Caledonia
- E. grandis Raven, 1994 — New Caledonia
- E. heloiseae Raven, 1994 — New Caledonia
- E. koghi Raven & Churchill, 1991 — New Caledonia
- E. kone Raven & Churchill, 1991 — New Caledonia
- E. kottae Raven & Churchill, 1991 — New Caledonia
- E. kritscheri Raven & Churchill, 1991 — New Caledonia
- E. kwakwa Raven, 1994 — New Caledonia
- E. letocarti Raven & Churchill, 1991 — New Caledonia
- E. lugubris Raven & Churchill, 1991 — New Caledonia
- E. mckeei Raven, 1994 — New Caledonia
- E. meleagris Simon, 1889 (type) — New Caledonia
- E. montdo Raven & Churchill, 1991 — New Caledonia
- E. montmou Raven & Churchill, 1991 — New Caledonia
- E. neocaledonica Raven & Churchill, 1991 — New Caledonia
- E. niaouli Raven & Churchill, 1991 — New Caledonia
- E. ouazangou Raven, 1994 — New Caledonia
- E. oubatche Raven & Churchill, 1991 — New Caledonia
- E. panie Raven & Churchill, 1991 — New Caledonia
- E. risbeci Raven, 1994 — New Caledonia
- E. tillieri Raven & Churchill, 1991 — New Caledonia
- E. tindia Raven & Churchill, 1991 — New Caledonia

=== Eubrachycercus ===
Eubrachycercus Pocock, 1897

- E. smithi Pocock, 1897 (type) — Somalia

== F ==
=== Fijocrypta ===
Fijocrypta Raven, 1994

- F. vitilevu Raven, 1994 (type) — Fiji

== I ==
=== Idioctis ===
Idioctis L. Koch, 1874

- I. eniwetok Raven, 1988 — Marshall Is., Caroline Is.
- I. ferrophila Churchill & Raven, 1992 — New Caledonia
- I. helva L. Koch, 1874 (type) — Fiji
- I. intertidalis (Benoit & Legendre, 1968) — Madagascar, Seychelles, Mayotte
- I. littoralis Abraham, 1924 — Singapore
- I. marovo Churchill & Raven, 1992 — Solomon Is.
- I. talofa Churchill & Raven, 1992 — Samoa
- I. xmas Raven, 1988 — Australia (Christmas Is.)
- I. yerlata Churchill & Raven, 1992 — Australia (Queensland)

=== Idiommata ===
Idiommata

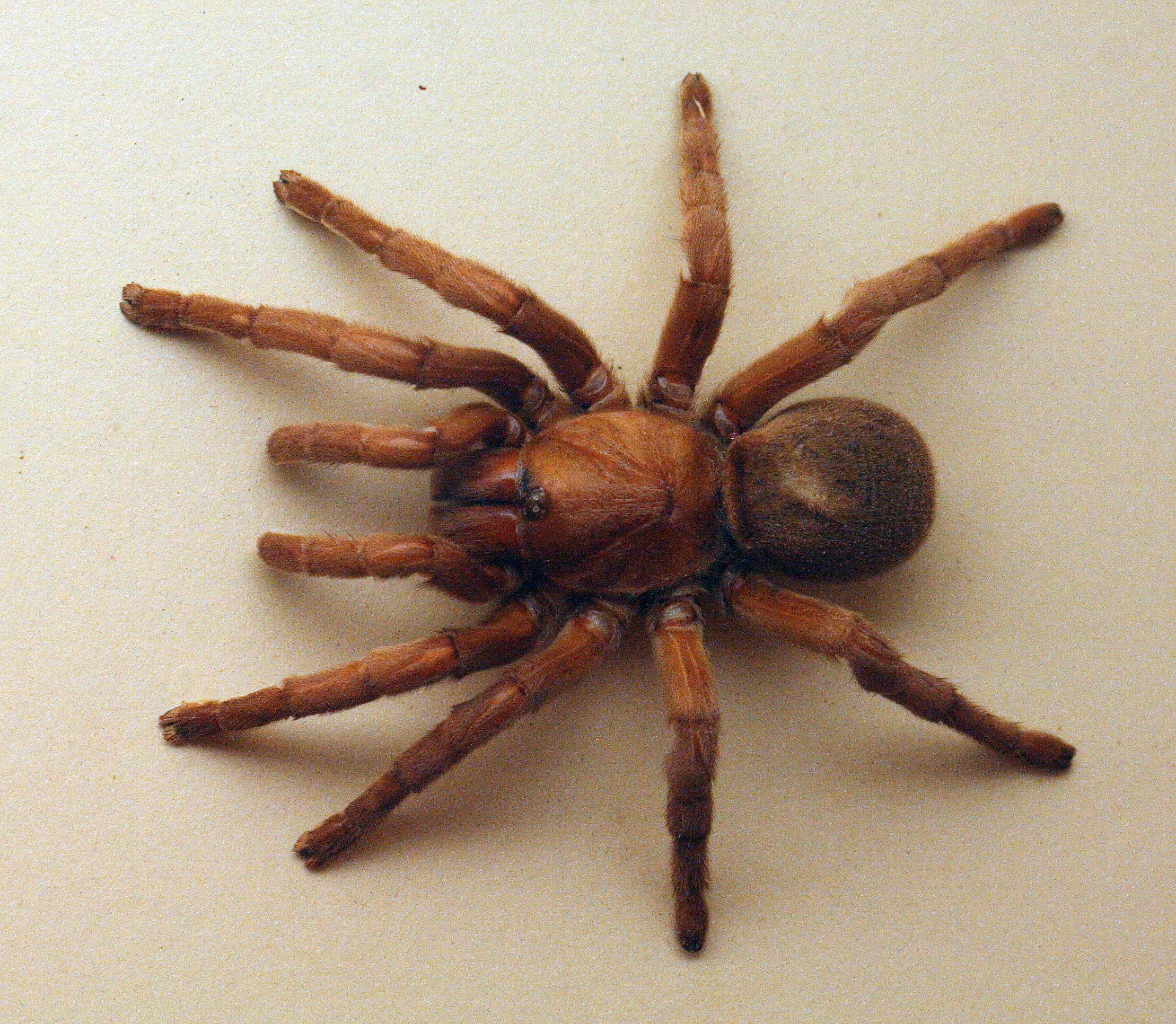
Idiommata iridescens

Idiommata Ausserer, 1871

- I. blackwalli (O. Pickard-Cambridge, 1870) (type) — Australia (Western Australia)
- I. fusca L. Koch, 1874 — Australia (Queensland)
- I. iridescens (Rainbow & Pulleine, 1918) — Australia (Queensland)
- I. scintillans (Rainbow & Pulleine, 1918) — Australia (South Australia)

=== Idiophthalma ===
Idiophthalma O. Pickard-Cambridge, 1877

- I. amazonica Simon, 1889 — Brazil
- I. ecuadorensis Berland, 1913 — Ecuador
- I. pantherina Simon, 1889 — Venezuela
- I. robusta Simon, 1889 — Ecuador
- I. suspecta O. Pickard-Cambridge, 1877 (type) — Colombia

== M ==
=== Mandjelia ===
Mandjelia Raven, 1994

- M. anzses Raven & Churchill, 1994 — Australia (Queensland)
- M. banksi Raven & Churchill, 1994 — Australia (Queensland)
- M. brassi Raven & Churchill, 1994 (type) — Australia (Queensland)
- M. colemani Raven & Churchill, 1994 — Australia (Queensland)
- M. commoni Raven & Churchill, 1994 — Australia (Queensland)
- M. exasperans Raven & Churchill, 1994 — Australia (Queensland)
- M. fleckeri Raven & Churchill, 1994 — Australia (Queensland)
- M. galmarra Raven & Churchill, 1994 — Australia (Queensland)
- M. humphreysi Raven & Churchill, 1994 — Australia (Western Australia)
- M. iwupataka Raven & Churchill, 1994 — Australia (Northern Territory)
- M. macgregori Raven & Churchill, 1994 — Australia (Queensland)
- M. madura Raven & Churchill, 1994 — Australia (Western Australia)
- M. mccrackeni Raven & Churchill, 1994 — Australia (Queensland)
- M. nuganuga Raven & Churchill, 1994 — Australia (Queensland)
- M. oenpelli Raven & Churchill, 1994 — Australia (Northern Territory)
- M. paluma Raven & Churchill, 1994 — Australia (Queensland)
- M. platnicki Raven, 1994 — New Caledonia
- M. qantas Raven & Churchill, 1994 — Australia (Queensland)
- M. rejae Raven & Churchill, 1994 — Australia (Queensland)
- M. thorelli (Raven, 1990) — Australia (Queensland)
- M. wooroonooran Raven & Churchill, 1994 — Australia (Queensland)
- M. wyandotte Raven & Churchill, 1994 — Australia (Queensland)
- M. yuccabine Raven & Churchill, 1994 — Australia (Queensland)

=== Monodontium ===
Monodontium Kulczyński, 1908

- M. bukittimah Raven, 2008 — Singapore
- M. malkini Raven, 2008 — New Guinea
- M. mutabile Kulczyński, 1908 (type) — New Guinea
- M. sarawak Raven, 2008 — Borneo
- M. tetrathela Kulczyński, 1908 — New Guinea

=== Moruga ===
Moruga Raven, 1994

- M. doddi Raven, 1994 — Australia (Queensland)
- M. fuliginea (Thorell, 1881) — Australia (Queensland)
- M. heatherae Raven, 1994 — Australia (Queensland)
- M. insularis Raven, 1994 — Australia (Queensland)
- M. kimberleyi Raven, 1994 — Australia (Western Australia)
- M. thickthorni Raven, 1994 (type) — Australia (Queensland)
- M. thorsborneorum Raven, 1994 — Australia (Queensland)
- M. wallaceae Raven, 1994 — Australia (Queensland)

== N ==
=== Natgeogia ===
Natgeogia Raven, 1994

- N. rastellata Raven, 1994 (type) — New Caledonia

=== Neodiplothele ===
Neodiplothele Mello-Leitão, 1917

- N. aureus Gonzalez-Filho, Lucas & Brescovit, 2015 — Brazil
- N. caucaia Gonzalez-Filho, Lucas & Brescovit, 2015 — Brazil
- N. flavicoma (Simon, 1891) — Brazil
- N. fluminensis Mello-Leitão, 1924 — Brazil
- N. indicattii Gonzalez-Filho, Lucas & Brescovit, 2015 — Brazil
- N. irregularis Mello-Leitão, 1917 (type) — Brazil
- N. itabaiana Gonzalez-Filho, Lucas & Brescovit, 2015 — Brazil
- N. martinsi Gonzalez-Filho, Lucas & Brescovit, 2015 — Brazil
- N. picta Vellard, 1924 — Brazil

=== Nihoa ===
Nihoa Raven & Churchill, 1992

- N. annulata (Kulczyński, 1908) — New Guinea
- N. annulipes (Thorell, 1881) — New Guinea
- N. aussereri (L. Koch, 1874) — Palau Is.
- N. bisianumu Raven, 1994 — New Guinea
- N. courti Raven, 1994 — New Guinea
- N. crassipes (Rainbow, 1898) — New Guinea
- N. gressitti Raven, 1994 — New Guinea
- N. gruberi Raven, 1994 — Papua New Guinea (New Ireland)
- N. hawaiiensis (Raven, 1988) — Hawaii
- N. itakara Raven, 1994 — New Guinea
- N. kaindi Raven, 1994 — New Guinea
- N. karawari Raven, 1994 — New Guinea
- N. lambleyi Raven, 1994 — New Guinea
- N. madang Raven, 1994 — New Guinea
- N. mahina Churchill & Raven, 1992 (type) — Hawaii
- N. maior (Kulczyński, 1908) — New Guinea
- N. mambulu Raven, 1994 — Solomon Is.
- N. pictipes (Pocock, 1898) — New Guinea, Papua New Guinea (New Britain, New Ireland), Solomon Is.
- N. raleighi Raven, 1994 — New Guinea
- N. tatei Raven, 1994 — New Guinea
- N. vanuatu Raven, 1994 — Vanuatu
- N. variata (Thorell, 1881) — New Guinea
- N. verireti Raven, 1994 — New Guinea

== O ==
=== Orstom ===
Orstom Raven, 1994

- O. aoupinie Raven, 1994 — New Caledonia
- O. chazeaui Raven & Churchill, 1994 (type) — New Caledonia
- O. hydratemei Raven & Churchill, 1994 — New Caledonia
- O. macmillani Raven, 1994 — New Caledonia
- O. tropicus Raven, 1994 — New Caledonia
- O. undecimatus Raven, 1994 — New Caledonia

=== Ozicrypta ===
Ozicrypta Raven, 1994

- O. australoborealis Raven & Churchill, 1994 — Australia (Northern Territory)
- O. clarki Raven & Churchill, 1994 — Australia (Queensland)
- O. clyneae Raven & Churchill, 1994 — Australia (Queensland)
- O. combeni Raven & Churchill, 1994 — Australia (Queensland)
- O. cooloola Raven & Churchill, 1994 (type) — Australia (Queensland)
- O. digglesi Raven & Churchill, 1994 — Australia (Queensland)
- O. etna Raven & Churchill, 1994 — Australia (Queensland)
- O. eungella Raven & Churchill, 1994 — Australia (Queensland)
- O. filmeri Raven & Churchill, 1994 — Australia (Queensland)
- O. hollinsae Raven & Churchill, 1994 — Australia (Queensland)
- O. kroombit Raven & Churchill, 1994 — Australia (Queensland)
- O. lawlessi Raven & Churchill, 1994 — Australia (Queensland)
- O. littleorum Raven & Churchill, 1994 — Australia (Queensland)
- O. mcarthurae Raven & Churchill, 1994 — Australia (Queensland)
- O. mcdonaldi Raven & Churchill, 1994 — Australia (Queensland)
- O. microcauda Raven & Churchill, 1994 — Australia (Queensland)
- O. noonamah Raven & Churchill, 1994 — Australia (Northern Territory)
- O. palmarum (Hogg, 1901) — Australia (Northern Territory)
- O. pearni Raven & Churchill, 1994 — Australia (Queensland)
- O. reticulata (L. Koch, 1874) — Australia (Queensland)
- O. sinclairi Raven & Churchill, 1994 — Australia (Queensland)
- O. tuckeri Raven & Churchill, 1994 — Australia (Queensland)
- O. walkeri Raven & Churchill, 1994 — Australia (Queensland)
- O. wallacei Raven & Churchill, 1994 — Australia (Queensland)
- O. wrightae Raven & Churchill, 1994 — Australia (Queensland)

== P ==
=== Paracenobiopelma ===
Paracenobiopelma Feio, 1952

- P. gerecormophilum Feio, 1952 (type) — Brazil

=== Pisenor ===
Pisenor Simon, 1889

- P. arcturus (Tucker, 1917) — Zimbabwe
- P. leleupi (Benoit, 1965) — Congo
- P. lepidus (Gerstaecker, 1873) — Tanzania
- P. macequece (Tucker, 1920) — Mozambique
- P. notius Simon, 1889 (type) — Ethiopia to Zimbabwe
- P. plicatus (Benoit, 1965) — Rwanda
- P. selindanus (Benoit, 1965) — Zimbabwe
- P. tenuistylus (Benoit, 1965) — Congo
- P. upembanus (Roewer, 1953) — Congo

=== Plagiobothrus ===
Plagiobothrus Karsch, 1892

- P. semilunaris Karsch, 1892 (type) — Sri Lanka

=== † Psalistops ===
† Psalistops Simon, 1889

- † P. hispaniolensis Wunderlich, 1988

== Q ==
=== Questocrypta ===
Questocrypta Raven, 1994

- Q. goloboffi Raven, 1994 (type) — New Caledonia

== R ==
=== Rhianodes ===
Rhianodes Raven, 1985

- R. atratus (Thorell, 1890) (type) — Malaysia, Singapore, Philippines

== S ==
=== Sason ===
Sason

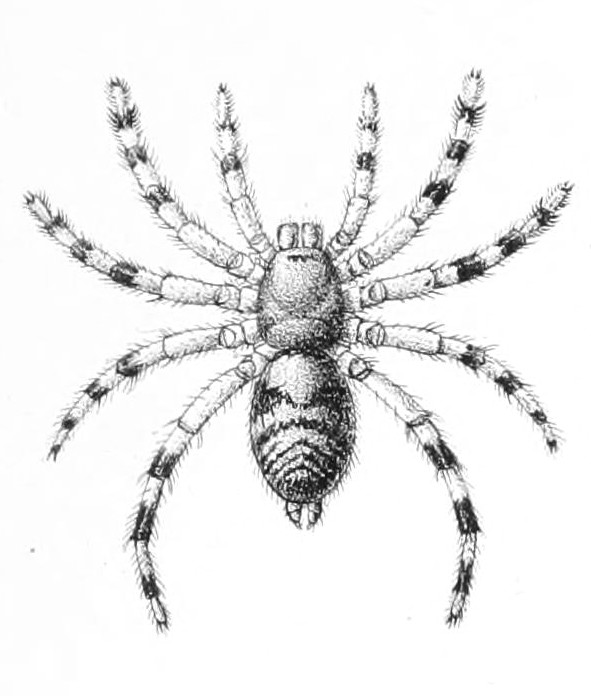
Sason robustum

Sason Simon, 1887

- S. andamanicum (Simon, 1888) — India (Andaman Is.)
- S. colemani Raven, 1986 — Australia (Queensland)
- S. hirsutum Schwendinger, 2003 — Indonesia
- S. maculatum (Roewer, 1963) — Mariana Is., Caroline Is.
- S. pectinatum Kulczyński, 1908 — New Guinea
- S. rameshwaram Siliwal & Molur, 2009 — India
- S. robustum (O. Pickard-Cambridge, 1883) (type) — India, Sri Lanka, Seychelles
- S. sechellanum Simon, 1898 — Seychelles
- S. sundaicum Schwendinger, 2003 — Thailand, Malaysia

=== Sasonichus ===
Sasonichus Pocock, 1900

- S. sullivani Pocock, 1900 (type) — India

=== Seqocrypta ===
Seqocrypta Raven, 1994

- S. bancrofti Raven, 1994 — Australia (New South Wales)
- S. hamlynharrisi Raven & Churchill, 1994 — Australia (Queensland)
- S. jakara Raven, 1994 (type) — Australia (Queensland, New South Wales)
- S. mckeowni Raven, 1994 — Australia (New South Wales)

=== Sipalolasma ===
Sipalolasma Simon, 1892

- S. aedificatrix Abraham, 1924 — Malaysia
- S. arthrapophysis (Gravely, 1915) — India
- S. bicalcarata (Simon, 1904) — Ethiopia
- S. ellioti Simon, 1892 (type) — Sri Lanka
- S. greeni Pocock, 1900 — Sri Lanka
- S. humicola (Benoit, 1965) — Mozambique
- S. kissi Benoit, 1966 — Congo
- S. ophiriensis Abraham, 1924 — Malaysia
- S. warnantae Benoit, 1966 — Congo

=== Strophaeus ===
Strophaeus Ausserer, 1875

- S. austeni (F. O. Pickard-Cambridge, 1896) — Brazil
- S. kochi (O. Pickard-Cambridge, 1870) (type) — Peru
- S. pentodon (Simon, 1892) — Brazil
- S. sebastiani Miranda & Bermúdez, 2010 — Panama

=== Synothele ===
Synothele Simon, 1908

- S. arrakis Raven, 1994 — Australia (Western Australia)
- S. boongaree Raven, 1994 — Australia (Western Australia)
- S. butleri Raven, 1994 — Australia (Western Australia)
- S. durokoppin Raven, 1994 — Australia (Western Australia)
- S. goongarrie Raven, 1994 — Australia (Western Australia)
- S. harveyi Churchill & Raven, 1994 — Australia (Western Australia)
- S. houstoni Raven, 1994 — Australia (Western Australia)
- S. howi Raven, 1994 — Australia (Western Australia)
- S. karara Raven, 1994 — Australia (Western Australia)
- S. koonalda Raven, 1994 — Australia (South Australia)
- S. longbottomi Raven, 1994 — Australia (Western Australia)
- S. lowei Raven, 1994 — Australia (Western Australia)
- S. meadhunteri Raven, 1994 — Australia (Western Australia, South Australia)
- S. michaelseni Simon, 1908 (type) — Australia (Western Australia)
- S. moonabie Raven, 1994 — Australia (South Australia)
- S. mullaloo Raven, 1994 — Australia (Western Australia)
- S. ooldea Raven, 1994 — Australia (South Australia)
- S. parifusca (Main, 1954) — Australia (Western Australia)
- S. pectinata Raven, 1994 — Australia (Western Australia)
- S. rastelloides Raven, 1994 — Australia (Western Australia)
- S. rubripes Raven, 1994 — Australia (Western Australia)
- S. subquadrata Raven, 1994 — Australia (Western Australia)
- S. taurus Raven, 1994 — Australia (Western Australia)
- S. yundamindra Raven, 1994 — Australia (Western Australia)

== T ==
=== Thalerommata ===
Thalerommata Ausserer, 1875

- T. gracilis Ausserer, 1875 (type) — Colombia
- T. macella (Simon, 1903) — Colombia
- T. meridana (Chamberlin & Ivie, 1938) — Mexico

=== Tigidia ===
Tigidia Simon, 1892

- T. alluaudi (Simon, 1902) — Madagascar
- T. bastardi (Simon, 1902) — Madagascar
- T. dubia (Strand, 1907) — Madagascar
- T. konkanensis Mirza, Zende & Patil, 2016 — India
- T. majori (Pocock, 1903) — Madagascar
- T. mathiauxi (Simon, 1902) — Madagascar
- T. mauriciana Simon, 1892 (type) — Mauritius
- T. nilgiriensis Sanap, Mirza & Siliwal, 2011 — India
- T. rutilofronis Sanap, Mirza & Siliwal, 2011 — India
- T. sahyadri Siliwal, Gupta & Raven, 2011 — India
- T. typica (Strand, 1907) — Madagascar

=== Trittame ===
Trittame L. Koch, 1874

- T. augusteyni Raven, 1994 — Australia (Queensland)
- T. bancrofti (Rainbow & Pulleine, 1918) — Australia (Queensland)
- T. berniesmythi Raven, 1994 — Australia (Queensland)
- T. forsteri Raven, 1990 — Australia (Queensland)
- T. gracilis L. Koch, 1874 (type) — Australia (Queensland)
- T. ingrami Raven, 1990 — Australia (Queensland)
- T. kochi Raven, 1990 — Australia (Queensland)
- T. loki Raven, 1990 — Australia (Queensland)
- T. mccolli Raven, 1994 — Australia (Queensland)
- T. rainbowi Raven, 1994 — Australia (Queensland)
- T. stonieri Raven, 1994 — Australia (Queensland)
- T. xerophila Raven, 1990 — Australia (Queensland)

=== Troglothele ===
Troglothele Fage, 1929

- T. coeca Fage, 1929 (type) — Cuba

=== Tungari ===
Tungari Raven, 1994

- T. aurukun Raven, 1994 — Australia (Queensland)
- T. kenwayae Raven, 1994 (type) — Australia (Queensland)
- T. mascordi Raven, 1994 — Australia (Queensland)
- T. monteithi Raven, 1994 — Australia (Queensland)

== Z ==
=== Zophorame ===
Zophorame Raven, 1990

- Z. covacevichae Raven, 1994 — Australia (Queensland)
- Z. gallonae Raven, 1990 — Australia (Queensland)
- Z. hirsti Raven, 1994 — Australia (Queensland)
- Z. simoni Raven, 1990 (type) — Australia (Queensland)

=== Zophoryctes ===
Zophoryctes Simon, 1902

- Z. flavopilosus Simon, 1902 (type) — Madagascar
