= Jakara =

Jakara is a given name and a surname. Notable people with the name include:

- Dejan Jakara (born 1986), Slovenian basketball coach
- Jakara Anthony (born 1998), Australian freestyle skier
- Jakara Jackson (born 1994), American wrestler

== See also ==
- Seqocrypta jakara, species of spider
