= Nīhoa trapdoor spider =

- Artist's rendition

Scientific classification
- Kingdom: Animalia
- Phylum: Arthropoda
- Subphylum: Chelicerata
- Class: Arachnida
- Order: Araneae
- Infraorder: Mygalomorphae
- Family: Barychelidae
- Genus: Nihoa
- Species: N. mahina

Binomial name
- Nihoa mahina Churchill & Raven, 1992

Species of spider

The Nīhoa trapdoor spider (Nihoa mahina) is a species of trapdoor spider in the family of Barychelidae that occurs on the island of Nīhoa, Hawaii in the northwestern area of the Hawaiian island chain. Its scientific name can be broken up into two parts, Nihoa which is not only its place of origin but the name of its genus, and mahina, which means 'moon' in the Hawaiian language. This could tie back to the fact that the species was discovered not only in the moonlight but also has fine silver hair, resembling its namesake. The species can also be distinguished by a pattern found on its dorsal and the absence of a second row of teeth. Burrows of trapdoor spiders can commonly be found by mangrove roots or near loose coral rubble. Before the 1980s, trapdoor spiders were not thought to exist in Hawaii. Upon their discovery, the genus was given the name Nihoa, because it was assumed not to exist elsewhere.

== Taxonomy and classifications ==
Nihoa mahina is an arachnid belonging to the subphylum Chelicerata and the family Barychelidae. Before the 1980s, trapdoor spiders were not thought to exist in Hawaii. Upon discovery, the species was originally classified as part of the genus Idioctis. However, upon further research by Tracey Churchill and Robert Raven, they were moved to a new genus due to their differing physical attributes, given the name Nihoa, because it was thought to exist nowhere else. Eventually, over 23 species across the Pacific were found throughout the southwestern Pacific. The species' conservation status has also been accepted by the science community as a vulnerable species.

== Description and anatomy ==
The spider itself is a species of intertidal trapdoor spider. The species was discovered in moonlight but also has fine silver hair. Its furrow promargin has eight thick teeth and three smaller teeth which act as a multi-purpose tool for spiders within the Chelicerata subphylum. These spiders are hunters that dig a hole near rocks and cover it with a concealed trapdoor. These burrows are excavated completely with the spider's jaw. When prey approaches or falls in, the spider pounces on it. Then its abnormally large pedipalps are used to take food into the mouth. Nīhoa trapdoor spiders can be distinguished by their wider sternum, the medially located teeth paired claws of the males, and the absence of a second row of teeth on the claws of the females. Male Nīhoa trapdoor spiders grow to almost 15 mm (0.59 in) long, including their chelicerae. The females are larger, reaching up to 21 mm (0.83 in). Females also carry a dissimilarity to their vulva which is crucial to the identification of the species.

== Distribution and habitat ==
This species is endemic to the island of Nīhoa, Hawaii. They inhabit the area of the coastline that is exposed during low tide and submerged during high tide, and are commonly found by mangrove roots or near loose coral rubble.
