= Fijocrypta =

Scientific classification
- Domain: Eukaryota
- Kingdom: Animalia
- Phylum: Arthropoda
- Subphylum: Chelicerata
- Class: Arachnida
- Order: Araneae
- Infraorder: Mygalomorphae
- Family: Barychelidae
- Genus: Fijocrypta; Raven, 1994
- Species: F. vitilevu

Binomial name
- Fijocrypta vitilevu Raven, 1994

Genus of spiders

Fijocrypta is a monotypic genus of South Pacific brushed trapdoor spiders containing the single species, Fijocrypta vitilevu. Both genus and species were first described by Robert Raven in 1994, and they have only been found in Fiji. It was first found in rainforests in the eastern highlands of Viti Levu, the largest island in Fiji, from which the species name is derived. The genus name is derived from "Fiji" and the Latin word cryptus, meaning "hidden".

== Description ==
The male Fijocrypta vitilevu can grow to a body length of nearly 9 millimetres (0.35 in) long. It has an orange-brown carapace with fine darker lines and darker areas towards the front. The chelicerae are also orange-brown, and the legs are yellow-brown without ring markings. The upper surface of the opisthosoma is brown with many small white spots. The lower surface is about equally brown and white. The palpal bulb is pear-shaped with a short blunt embolus at the end.

Females have a somewhat longer body, growing up to 11 millimetres (0.43 in) long. They have a similar coloring, except the legs are orange-brown and the paler spots on the upper surface of the abdomen form either lines or chevrons rather than the seemingly random scatter of males.

Fijocrypta can be distinguished from most other brushed trapdoor spiders in the western Pacific by the absence of a spur on the tibia of the first leg in males. Seqocrypta and Moruga males also lack this spur, but Fijocrypta males have two rows of teeth on the claws and the embolus doesn't have a fine tip.
