= Idioctis parilarilao =

Scientific classification
- Domain: Eukaryota
- Kingdom: Animalia
- Phylum: Arthropoda
- Subphylum: Chelicerata
- Class: Arachnida
- Order: Araneae
- Infraorder: Mygalomorphae
- Family: Barychelidae
- Genus: Idioctis
- Species: I. parilarilao

Binomial name
- Idioctis parilarilao Yu, Lo, Cheng, Raven & Kuntner, 2023

Species of spider

Idioctis parilarilao is a species of mygalomorph spider in the Barychelidae family. The species name parilarilao also forms a part of its alternative name, the parilarilao trapdoor spider. In the Paiwan language, parilarilao means "living at the end of Taiwan". Despite several searches during the species identification process, only female I. parilarilao specimens were found. The species was located in Kenting and Green Island.
