= Sasonichus =

Scientific classification
- Kingdom: Animalia
- Phylum: Arthropoda
- Subphylum: Chelicerata
- Class: Arachnida
- Order: Araneae
- Infraorder: Mygalomorphae
- Family: Barychelidae
- Genus: Sasonichus; Pocock, 1900
- Species: S. sullivani

Binomial name
- Sasonichus sullivani Pocock, 1900

Genus of spiders

Sasonichus is a monotypic genus of Asian brushed trapdoor spiders containing the single species, Sasonichus sullivani. It was first described by Reginald Innes Pocock in 1900, and has only been found in India. The species Sipalolasma arthrapophysis was briefly placed here before being moved to Sipalolasma in 1985.
