= Pisenor notius =

Pisenor Lesser Baboon Spider

Conservation status
- Least Concern (SANBI Red List)

Scientific classification
- Kingdom: Animalia
- Phylum: Arthropoda
- Subphylum: Chelicerata
- Class: Arachnida
- Order: Araneae
- Infraorder: Mygalomorphae
- Family: Barychelidae
- Genus: Pisenor
- Species: P. notius

Binomial name
- Pisenor notius Simon, 1889

Synonyms
- Pisenor höhneli Simon, 1890; Pisenorodes höhneli (Pocock, 1898); Pisenor pustulatus Strand, 1906; Pisenor incertus Caporiacco, 1947

Species of spider

Pisenor notius is a species of spider in the genus Pisenor of the family Barychelidae. It is an African endemic and serves as the type species of the genus.

== Distribution ==
Pisenor notius has a wide African distribution, occurring in Ethiopia, Botswana, Zimbabwe, and South Africa. In South Africa, it is known from two provinces: Limpopo and Mpumalanga.

In Limpopo, it has been recorded from Blouberg Nature Reserve, Little Leigh, and Koedoesvlei in the Western Soutpansberg. In Mpumalanga, it occurs at the Lowveld National Botanical Gardens.

== Habitat and ecology ==
This species is a ground-living burrow dweller found in the Savanna Biome. Like other Pisenor species, some specimens have been sampled from burrows closed by trapdoors whose lids are camouflaged with bits of leaves. This behavior was specifically documented by Benoit (1966) for this species.

== Conservation status ==
Pisenor notius is listed as Least Concern by the South African National Biodiversity Institute (SANBI). Despite being described from Zimbabwe in 1917, it is known from four African countries and has a wide geographical range. In South Africa, it is found at elevations ranging from 653-1146 meters above sea level.

The species is protected in two conservation areas: Blouberg Nature Reserve and Lowveld National Botanical Gardens. Due to its wide geographical range across Africa, no specific conservation actions are recommended.

== Description ==
Pisenor notius is known from both sexes. As the type species of the genus, it displays all the characteristic features of Pisenor, including the distinctive eye arrangement, the absence of a rastellum, and the typical ground-dwelling burrow construction behavior with camouflaged trapdoors.
