= Pisenor =

Scientific classification
- Kingdom: Animalia
- Phylum: Arthropoda
- Subphylum: Chelicerata
- Class: Arachnida
- Order: Araneae
- Infraorder: Mygalomorphae
- Family: Barychelidae
- Genus: Pisenor; Simon, 1889

Type species
- P. notius Simon, 1889

Species
- 9, see text

Synonyms
- Urothele Tullgren, 1910

Genus of spiders

Pisenor is a genus of mygalomorph spiders in the family Barychelidae. The genus is known from nine species endemic to Africa, distributed from Zimbabwe to the southern parts of Ethiopia.

It was first described by Eugène Simon in 1889.

== Description ==
Pisenor spiders have body sizes ranging from 15–25 mm. Females are usually 'earth'-colored, varying from yellowish grey to reddish brown to greyish black, with the opisthosoma bearing pale spots or patches.

The anterior lateral eyes are positioned close to the clypeal edge. The eyes are arranged in a group that is wider behind than in front, with the eye tubercle being distinct. A rastellum is absent, and the fovea is recurved. There are two pairs of spinnerets, and the metatarsal preening comb is absent. Males possess a tibial spur on leg I, while females have one row of teeth on the paired claws and males have two rows.

== Behavior and ecology ==
Pisenor species are ground-living burrow dwellers. Very little is known about their behavior, with the only published information being a note by Benoit (1966) who collected P. notius from a burrow with a trapdoor covered by bits of leaves.

== Species ==
As of September 2025 it contains nine species:

- Pisenor arcturus (Tucker, 1917) – Botswana, Zimbabwe, South Africa
- Pisenor leleupi (Benoit, 1965) – Democratic Republic of the Congo
- Pisenor lepidus (Gerstäcker, 1873) – Tanzania
- Pisenor macequece (Tucker, 1920) – Mozambique
- Pisenor notius Simon, 1889 (type) – Ethiopia, Botswana, Zimbabwe, South Africa
- Pisenor plicatus (Benoit, 1965) – Rwanda
- Pisenor selindanus (Benoit, 1965) – Zimbabwe
- Pisenor tenuistylus (Benoit, 1965) – Democratic Republic of the Congo
- Pisenor upembanus (Roewer, 1953) – Democratic Republic of the Congo
