= Adelonychia halyi =

Scientific classification
- Kingdom: Animalia
- Phylum: Arthropoda
- Subphylum: Chelicerata
- Class: Arachnida
- Order: Araneae
- Infraorder: Mygalomorphae
- Family: Barychelidae
- Genus: Adelonychia
- Species: A. halyi

Binomial name
- Adelonychia halyi Simon, 1892

Species of spider

Adelonychia halyi is a species of spider of the genus Adelonychia. It is endemic to Sri Lanka. Differences from the type species Adelonychia walshi include a large fovea and a less distinct abdominal pattern. The male is more hairy than female, with a slightly elevated spine. It was first described from the Nuwara Eliya area.
