= Tungari mascordi =

Scientific classification
- Kingdom: Animalia
- Phylum: Arthropoda
- Subphylum: Chelicerata
- Class: Arachnida
- Order: Araneae
- Infraorder: Mygalomorphae
- Family: Barychelidae
- Genus: Tungari
- Species: T. mascordi

Binomial name
- Tungari mascordi Raven, 1994

Species of spider

Tungari mascordi is a species of mygalomorph spider in the Barychelidae family. It is endemic to Australia. It was described in 1994 by Australian arachnologist Robert Raven. The specific epithet mascordi honours photographer and amateur arachnologist Ramon Mascord (1913–1983).

== Distribution and habitat ==
The species occurs on Horn Island, off the northern tip of the Cape York Peninsula of Far North Queensland, in open sclerophyll forest habitats. The type locality is Horn Island.
