= Zophorame covacevichae =

Scientific classification
- Kingdom: Animalia
- Phylum: Arthropoda
- Subphylum: Chelicerata
- Class: Arachnida
- Order: Araneae
- Infraorder: Mygalomorphae
- Family: Barychelidae
- Genus: Zophorame
- Species: Z. covacevichae

Binomial name
- Zophorame covacevichae Raven, 1994

Species of spider

Zophorame covacevichae is a species of mygalomorph spider in the Barychelidae family. It is endemic to Australia. It was described in 1994 by Australian arachnologist Robert Raven. The specific epithet covacevichae honours Jeanette Covacevich, Senior Curator (Vertebrates) at the Queensland Museum, for her contribution to natural history.

== Distribution and habitat ==
The species occurs in Far North Queensland, in semi-evergreen vine thicket habitats. The type locality is Forty Mile Scrub, south-west of Mount Garnet.
