= Pisenor arcturus =

Zimbabwean Lesser Baboon spider

Conservation status
- Least Concern (SANBI Red List)

Scientific classification
- Kingdom: Animalia
- Phylum: Arthropoda
- Subphylum: Chelicerata
- Class: Arachnida
- Order: Araneae
- Infraorder: Mygalomorphae
- Family: Barychelidae
- Genus: Pisenor
- Species: P. arcturus

Binomial name
- Pisenor arcturus (Tucker, 1917)

Synonyms
- Diplothele arcturus Tucker, 1917; Urothele arcturus (Benoit, 1965)

Species of spider

Pisenor arcturus is a species of spider in the genus Pisenor of the family Barychelidae. It is a southern African endemic commonly known as the Zimbabwean lesser baboon spider.

== Distribution ==
Pisenor arcturus is distributed across southern Africa, occurring in Botswana, Zimbabwe, and South Africa. In South Africa, it is known from three provinces: Limpopo, Mpumalanga, and North West Province.

In Limpopo, it has been recorded from various localities including Springbokvlakte, Roedtan, multiple sites within Kruger National Park (Shingwedzi, Punda Milia, Lwakahle), Tuinplaas, and Blouberg Nature Reserve. In Mpumalanga, it occurs in Kruger National Park at Satara and Lwakahle. In North West Province, it has been found at Rustenburg Nature Reserve.

== Habitat and ecology ==
This species is a ground-living burrow dweller found in the Savanna Biome. Some specimens have been sampled from burrows closed by trapdoors whose lids are camouflaged with bits of leaves, similar to the behavior described for other Pisenor species.

== Conservation status ==
Pisenor arcturus is listed as Least Concern by the South African National Biodiversity Institute (SANBI). Although presently known only from females, it has a wide geographical range and is found at elevations ranging from 263-1171 meters above sea level. The species is likely to be under-collected given its wide distribution.

The species is protected in three conservation areas: Blouberg Nature Reserve, Kruger National Park, and Rustenburg Nature Reserve. No specific conservation actions are recommended due to its wide distribution and protected status in multiple reserves.

== Description ==
Pisenor arcturus is known only from females. Like other members of the genus, it displays the characteristic features of Barychelidae, including the typical eye arrangement on a distinct tubercle and the ground-dwelling burrow construction behavior.
