= Synothele houstoni =

Scientific classification
- Kingdom: Animalia
- Phylum: Arthropoda
- Subphylum: Chelicerata
- Class: Arachnida
- Order: Araneae
- Infraorder: Mygalomorphae
- Family: Barychelidae
- Genus: Synothele
- Species: S. houstoni

Binomial name
- Synothele houstoni Raven, 1994

Species of spider

Synothele houstoni is a species of mygalomorph spider in the Barychelidae family. It is endemic to Australia. It was described in 1994 by Australian arachnologist Robert Raven. The specific epithet houstoni honours Terry Houston, Curator of Insects at the Western Australian Museum.

== Distribution and habitat ==
The species occurs in southern Western Australia. The type locality is McDermid Rock, near Norseman.
