= Moruga fuliginea =

Scientific classification
- Kingdom: Animalia
- Phylum: Arthropoda
- Subphylum: Chelicerata
- Class: Arachnida
- Order: Araneae
- Infraorder: Mygalomorphae
- Family: Barychelidae
- Genus: Moruga
- Species: M. fuliginea

Binomial name
- Moruga fuliginea (Thorell, 1881)

Synonyms
- Idiommata fuliginea Thorell, 1881; Encyocrypta fuliginata Hogg, 1901

Species of spider

Moruga fuliginea is a species of mygalomorph spider in the Barychelidae family. It is endemic to Australia. It was described in 1881 by Swedish arachnologist Tamerlan Thorell.

== Description ==
The holotype male has a carapace 7.77 mm long by 6.15 mm wide. The carapace, chelicerae and legs are reddish-brown in colour.

== Distribution and habitat ==
The species occurs in the Gulf Country and Cape York Peninsula of northern Australia. The type locality is Somerset.
