= Questocrypta =

Scientific classification
- Domain: Eukaryota
- Kingdom: Animalia
- Phylum: Arthropoda
- Subphylum: Chelicerata
- Class: Arachnida
- Order: Araneae
- Infraorder: Mygalomorphae
- Family: Barychelidae
- Genus: Questocrypta; Raven, 1994
- Species: Q. goloboffi

Binomial name
- Questocrypta goloboffi Raven, 1994

Genus of spiders

Questocrypta is a monotypic genus of South Pacific brushed trapdoor spiders containing the single species, Questocrypta goloboffi. It was first described by Robert Raven in 1994, and has only been found on New Caledonia.
