= Sipalolasma greeni =

Scientific classification
- Kingdom: Animalia
- Phylum: Arthropoda
- Subphylum: Chelicerata
- Class: Arachnida
- Order: Araneae
- Infraorder: Mygalomorphae
- Family: Barychelidae
- Genus: Sipalolasma
- Species: S. greeni

Binomial name
- Sipalolasma greeni Pocock, 1900

Species of spider

Sipalolasma greeni is a species of spider of the genus Sipalolasma. It is endemic to Sri Lanka. The carapace and legs are deep brown in color. The abdomen is black. The known length is about 22 mm. The species was first found from Punduloya, Sri Lanka.
