= Eubrachycercus =

Scientific classification
- Kingdom: Animalia
- Phylum: Arthropoda
- Subphylum: Chelicerata
- Class: Arachnida
- Order: Araneae
- Infraorder: Mygalomorphae
- Family: Barychelidae
- Genus: Eubrachycercus; Pocock, 1897
- Species: E. smithi

Binomial name
- Eubrachycercus smithi Pocock, 1897

Genus of spiders

Eubrachycercus is a monotypic genus of East African brushed trapdoor spiders. The genus contains a single described species, Eubrachycercus smithi. It was established by British arachnologist Reginald Innes Pocock in 1897 during his studies of mygalomorph spiders from the Ethiopian Region.

== Taxonomy ==
The genus Eubrachycercus belongs to the family Barychelidae, commonly known as brushed trapdoor spiders, within the infraorder Mygalomorphae. As a monotypic genus, Eubrachycercus contains only one recognized species, Eubrachycercus smithi.

== Distribution ==
Eubrachycercus smithi has been recorded from Somalia in East Africa and is considered part of the endemic spider fauna of the region.

== Description ==
The species was originally described by Pocock in 1897 as part of his work on mygalomorph spiders from the Ethiopian Region. The available taxonomic records recognize Eubrachycercus smithi as the sole representative of its genus.
