= Synothele goongarrie =

Scientific classification
- Kingdom: Animalia
- Phylum: Arthropoda
- Subphylum: Chelicerata
- Class: Arachnida
- Order: Araneae
- Infraorder: Mygalomorphae
- Family: Barychelidae
- Genus: Synothele
- Species: S. goongarrie

Binomial name
- Synothele goongarrie Raven, 1994

Species of spider

Synothele goongarrie is a species of mygalomorph spider in the Barychelidae family. It is endemic to Australia. It was described in 1994 by Australian arachnologist Robert Raven. The specific epithet goongarrie refers to the type locality.

== Distribution and habitat ==
The species occurs in southern Western Australia, in the arid Goldfields region, in mallee–Triodia savanna habitats. The type locality is Goongarrie, about 94 km north of Kalgoorlie.
