= Tungari aurukun =

Scientific classification
- Kingdom: Animalia
- Phylum: Arthropoda
- Subphylum: Chelicerata
- Class: Arachnida
- Order: Araneae
- Infraorder: Mygalomorphae
- Family: Barychelidae
- Genus: Tungari
- Species: T. aurukun

Binomial name
- Tungari aurukun Raven, 1994

Species of spider

Tungari aurukun is a species of mygalomorph spider in the Barychelidae family. It is endemic to Australia. It was described in 1994 by Australian arachnologist Robert Raven. The specific epithet aurukun refers to the type locality.

== Distribution and habitat ==
The species occurs on the Cape York Peninsula of Far North Queensland in open forest habitats. The type locality is Aurukun.
