= Nihoa (spider) =

Scientific classification
- Kingdom: Animalia
- Phylum: Arthropoda
- Subphylum: Chelicerata
- Class: Arachnida
- Order: Araneae
- Infraorder: Mygalomorphae
- Family: Barychelidae
- Genus: Nihoa; Raven & Churchill, 1992

Type species
- N. mahina Churchill & Raven, 1992

Species
- 23, see text

Genus of spiders

Nihoa is a genus of South Pacific brushed trapdoor spiders first described by Tracey Churchill and Robert Raven in 1992. It is named after the island Nīhoa, where the type species (N. mahina) is endemic.

Male N. hawaiiensis grow to almost 15 millimetres (0.59 in) long, including chelicerae. The females are larger, growing up to 21 millimetres (0.83 in).

== Species ==
As of April 2019 it contains twenty-three species:

- Nihoa annulata (Kulczyński, 1908) – New Guinea
- Nihoa annulipes (Thorell, 1881) – New Guinea
- Nihoa aussereri (L. Koch, 1874) – Palau Is.
- Nihoa bisianumu Raven, 1994 – New Guinea
- Nihoa courti Raven, 1994 – New Guinea
- Nihoa crassipes (Rainbow, 1898) – New Guinea
- Nihoa gressitti Raven, 1994 – New Guinea
- Nihoa gruberi Raven, 1994 – Papua New Guinea (New Ireland)
- Nihoa hawaiiensis (Raven, 1988) – Hawaii
- Nihoa itakara Raven, 1994 – New Guinea
- Nihoa kaindi Raven, 1994 – New Guinea
- Nihoa karawari Raven, 1994 – New Guinea
- Nihoa lambleyi Raven, 1994 – New Guinea
- Nihoa madang Raven, 1994 – New Guinea
- Nihoa mahina Churchill & Raven, 1992 (type) – Hawaii
- Nihoa maior (Kulczyński, 1908) – New Guinea
- Nihoa mambulu Raven, 1994 – Solomon Is.
- Nihoa pictipes (Pocock, 1899) – New Guinea, Papua New Guinea (New Britain, New Ireland), Solomon Is.
- Nihoa raleighi Raven, 1994 – New Guinea
- Nihoa tatei Raven, 1994 – New Guinea
- Nihoa vanuatu Raven, 1994 – Vanuatu
- Nihoa variata (Thorell, 1881) – New Guinea
- Nihoa verireti Raven, 1994 – New Guinea
