= Synothele rastelloides =

Scientific classification
- Kingdom: Animalia
- Phylum: Arthropoda
- Subphylum: Chelicerata
- Class: Arachnida
- Order: Araneae
- Infraorder: Mygalomorphae
- Family: Barychelidae
- Genus: Synothele
- Species: S. rastelloides

Binomial name
- Synothele rastelloides Raven, 1994

Species of spider

Synothele rastelloides is a species of mygalomorph spider in the Barychelidae family. It is endemic to Australia. It was described in 1994 by Australian arachnologist Robert Raven.

== Distribution and habitat ==
The species occurs in the Great Southern region of south-west Western Australia. The type locality is the coastal town of Denmark.
