= Troglothele =

Scientific classification
- Domain: Eukaryota
- Kingdom: Animalia
- Phylum: Arthropoda
- Subphylum: Chelicerata
- Class: Arachnida
- Order: Araneae
- Infraorder: Mygalomorphae
- Family: Barychelidae
- Genus: Troglothele; Fage, 1929
- Species: T. coeca

Binomial name
- Troglothele coeca Fage, 1929

Genus of spiders

Troglothele is a monotypic genus of Caribbean brushed trapdoor spiders containing the single species, Troglothele coeca. It was first described by L. Fage in 1929, and has only been found in Cuba.
