= Idiommata fusca =

Scientific classification
- Kingdom: Animalia
- Phylum: Arthropoda
- Subphylum: Chelicerata
- Class: Arachnida
- Order: Araneae
- Infraorder: Mygalomorphae
- Family: Barychelidae
- Genus: Idiommata
- Species: I. fusca

Binomial name
- Idiommata fusca L.Koch, 1874

Species of spider

Idiommata fusca is a species of mygalomorph spider in the Barychelidae family. It is endemic to Australia. It was described in 1874 by German arachnologist Ludwig Carl Christian Koch.

== Distribution and habitat ==
The species occurs in coastal Central Queensland. The type locality is Rockhampton.

== Behaviour ==
The spiders are fossorial, terrestrial predators.
