= Zophoryctes =

Scientific classification
- Kingdom: Animalia
- Phylum: Arthropoda
- Subphylum: Chelicerata
- Class: Arachnida
- Order: Araneae
- Infraorder: Mygalomorphae
- Family: Barychelidae
- Genus: Zophoryctes; Simon, 1902
- Species: Z. flavopilosus

Binomial name
- Zophoryctes flavopilosus Simon, 1902

Genus of spiders

Zophoryctes is a monotypic genus of East African brushed trapdoor spiders containing the single species, Zophoryctes flavopilosus. It was first described by Eugène Simon in 1902, and has only been found in Madagascar.
