= Synothele meadhunteri =

Scientific classification
- Kingdom: Animalia
- Phylum: Arthropoda
- Subphylum: Chelicerata
- Class: Arachnida
- Order: Araneae
- Infraorder: Mygalomorphae
- Family: Barychelidae
- Genus: Synothele
- Species: S. meadhunteri

Binomial name
- Synothele meadhunteri Raven, 1994

Species of spider

Synothele meadhunteri is a species of mygalomorph spider in the Barychelidae family. It is endemic to Australia. It was described in 1994 by Australian arachnologist Robert Raven. The specific epithet meadhunteri honours Derek Mead-Hunter, collector and contributor of specimens to the Western Australian Museum.

== Distribution and habitat ==
The species occurs in the Goldfields–Esperance region of Western Australia and the Far North region of South Australia. The type locality is Queen Victoria Spring, about 200 km east of Kalgoorlie in the Great Victoria Desert. It has also been recorded from the Olympic Dam mine site at Roxby Downs.
