= Synothele longbottomi =

Scientific classification
- Kingdom: Animalia
- Phylum: Arthropoda
- Subphylum: Chelicerata
- Class: Arachnida
- Order: Araneae
- Infraorder: Mygalomorphae
- Family: Barychelidae
- Genus: Synothele
- Species: S. longbottomi

Binomial name
- Synothele longbottomi Raven, 1994

Species of spider

Synothele longbottomi is a species of mygalomorph spider in the Barychelidae family. It is endemic to Australia. It was described in 1994 by Australian arachnologist Robert Raven. The specific epithet longbottomi honours Alan Longbottom, collector of specimens for the Western Australian Museum.

== Distribution and habitat ==
The species occurs in south-west Western Australia in marri and jarrah woodland habitats. The type locality is Mount Cooke on the Darling Scarp near Jarrahdale.
