= Synothele durokoppin =

Scientific classification
- Kingdom: Animalia
- Phylum: Arthropoda
- Subphylum: Chelicerata
- Class: Arachnida
- Order: Araneae
- Infraorder: Mygalomorphae
- Family: Barychelidae
- Genus: Synothele
- Species: S. durokoppin

Binomial name
- Synothele durokoppin Raven, 1994

Species of spider

Synothele durokoppin is a species of mygalomorph spider in the Barychelidae family. It is endemic to Australia. It was described in 1994 by Australian arachnologist Robert Raven. The specific epithet durokoppin refers to the type locality.

== Distribution and habitat ==
The species occurs in the Avon Wheatbelt bioregion of south-west Western Australia. The type locality is Durokoppin Nature Reserve, 26 km north of Kellerberrin.
