= Synothele michaelseni =

Scientific classification
- Kingdom: Animalia
- Phylum: Arthropoda
- Subphylum: Chelicerata
- Class: Arachnida
- Order: Araneae
- Infraorder: Mygalomorphae
- Family: Barychelidae
- Genus: Synothele
- Species: S. michaelseni

Binomial name
- Synothele michaelseni Simon, 1908

Species of spider

Synothele michaelseni is a species of mygalomorph spider in the Barychelidae family. It is endemic to Australia. It was described in 1908 by French arachnologist Eugène Simon.

== Distribution and habitat ==
The species occurs in south-west Western Australia in the Darling Ranges in open forest habitats. The type locality is Mount Helena.

== Behaviour ==
The spiders are fossorial, terrestrial predators.
