= Sipalolasma ellioti =

Scientific classification
- Kingdom: Animalia
- Phylum: Arthropoda
- Subphylum: Chelicerata
- Class: Arachnida
- Order: Araneae
- Infraorder: Mygalomorphae
- Family: Barychelidae
- Genus: Sipalolasma
- Species: S. ellioti

Binomial name
- Sipalolasma ellioti Simon, 1892

Species of spider

Sipalolasma ellioti is a species of spider of the genus Sipalolasma. It is endemic to Sri Lanka. The female is 11 mm in length.
