= Synothele subquadrata =

Scientific classification
- Kingdom: Animalia
- Phylum: Arthropoda
- Subphylum: Chelicerata
- Class: Arachnida
- Order: Araneae
- Infraorder: Mygalomorphae
- Family: Barychelidae
- Genus: Synothele
- Species: S. subquadrata

Binomial name
- Synothele subquadrata Raven, 1994

Species of spider

Synothele subquadrata is a species of mygalomorph spider in the Barychelidae family. It is endemic to Australia. It was described in 1994 by Australian arachnologist Robert Raven. The specific epithet subquadrata refers to the spider's subquadrate (squareish) eye-group arrangement.

== Distribution and habitat ==
The species occurs in the Kimberley region of north-west Western Australia in rainforest habitats. The type locality is South West Osborn Island in the Bonaparte Archipelago.
