= Synothele butleri =

Scientific classification
- Kingdom: Animalia
- Phylum: Arthropoda
- Subphylum: Chelicerata
- Class: Arachnida
- Order: Araneae
- Infraorder: Mygalomorphae
- Family: Barychelidae
- Genus: Synothele
- Species: S. butleri

Binomial name
- Synothele butleri Raven, 1994

Species of spider

Synothele butleri is a species of mygalomorph spider in the Barychelidae family. It is endemic to Australia. It was described in 1994 by Australian arachnologist Robert Raven. The specific epithet butleri honours naturalist, environmental consultant and television presenter Harry Butler (1930–2015).

== Distribution and habitat ==
The species occurs in the Pilbara region of north-west Western Australia. The type locality is Barrow Island.
