= Moruga heatherae =

Scientific classification
- Kingdom: Animalia
- Phylum: Arthropoda
- Subphylum: Chelicerata
- Class: Arachnida
- Order: Araneae
- Infraorder: Mygalomorphae
- Family: Barychelidae
- Genus: Moruga
- Species: M. heatherae

Binomial name
- Moruga heatherae Raven, 1994

Species of spider

Moruga heatherae is a species of mygalomorph spider in the Barychelidae family. It is endemic to Australia. It was described in 1994 by Australian arachnologist Robert Raven. The specific epithet heatherae honours Heather Janetski, Education Officer at the Queensland Museum, for her contributions to natural history and the museum's collections from northern Queensland.

== Distribution and habitat ==
The species occurs in north-east Queensland in open eucalypt forest. The type locality is Shiptons Flat, just south of Cooktown, on the Cape York Peninsula.
