= Moruga kimberleyi =

Scientific classification
- Kingdom: Animalia
- Phylum: Arthropoda
- Subphylum: Chelicerata
- Class: Arachnida
- Order: Araneae
- Infraorder: Mygalomorphae
- Family: Barychelidae
- Genus: Moruga
- Species: M. kimberleyi

Binomial name
- Moruga kimberleyi Raven, 1994

Species of spider

Moruga kimberleyi is a species of mygalomorph spider in the Barychelidae family. It is endemic to Australia. It was described in 1994 by Australian arachnologist Robert Raven. The specific epithet kimberleyi refers to the region of the type locality.

== Distribution and habitat ==
The species occurs in the Kimberley region of north-west Western Australia, in rainforest habitats. The type locality is Face Point on the Carson River escarpment.
