= Natgeogia =

Scientific classification
- Domain: Eukaryota
- Kingdom: Animalia
- Phylum: Arthropoda
- Subphylum: Chelicerata
- Class: Arachnida
- Order: Araneae
- Infraorder: Mygalomorphae
- Family: Barychelidae
- Genus: Natgeogia; Raven, 1994
- Species: N. rastellata

Binomial name
- Natgeogia rastellata Raven, 1994

Genus of spiders

Natgeogia is a monotypic genus of South Pacific brushed trapdoor spiders containing the single species, Natgeogia rastellata. It was first described by Robert Raven in 1994, and has only been found on New Caledonia.
