= Plagiobothrus =

Scientific classification
- Kingdom: Animalia
- Phylum: Arthropoda
- Subphylum: Chelicerata
- Class: Arachnida
- Order: Araneae
- Infraorder: Mygalomorphae
- Family: Barychelidae
- Genus: Plagiobothrus; Karsch, 1892
- Species: P. semilunaris

Binomial name
- Plagiobothrus semilunaris Karsch, 1892

Genus of spiders

Plagiobothrus is a monotypic genus of Asian brushed trapdoor spiders containing the single species, Plagiobothrus semilunaris. It was first described by Ferdinand Karsch in 1892, and has only been found in Sri Lanka, documented from the regions of Peradeniya and Kandy. It is about 24 millimetres (0.94 in) long and has a deep brown carapace and limbs. Its abdomen is black above and brown beneath.
