= Atrophothele =

Scientific classification
- Kingdom: Animalia
- Phylum: Arthropoda
- Subphylum: Chelicerata
- Class: Arachnida
- Order: Araneae
- Infraorder: Mygalomorphae
- Family: Barychelidae
- Genus: Atrophothele; Pocock, 1903
- Species: A. socotrana

Binomial name
- Atrophothele socotrana Pocock, 1903

Genus of spiders

Atrophothele is a monotypic genus of Asian brushed trapdoor spiders containing the single species, Atrophothele socotrana. It was first described by Reginald Innes Pocock in 1903, and has only been found in Yemen.
