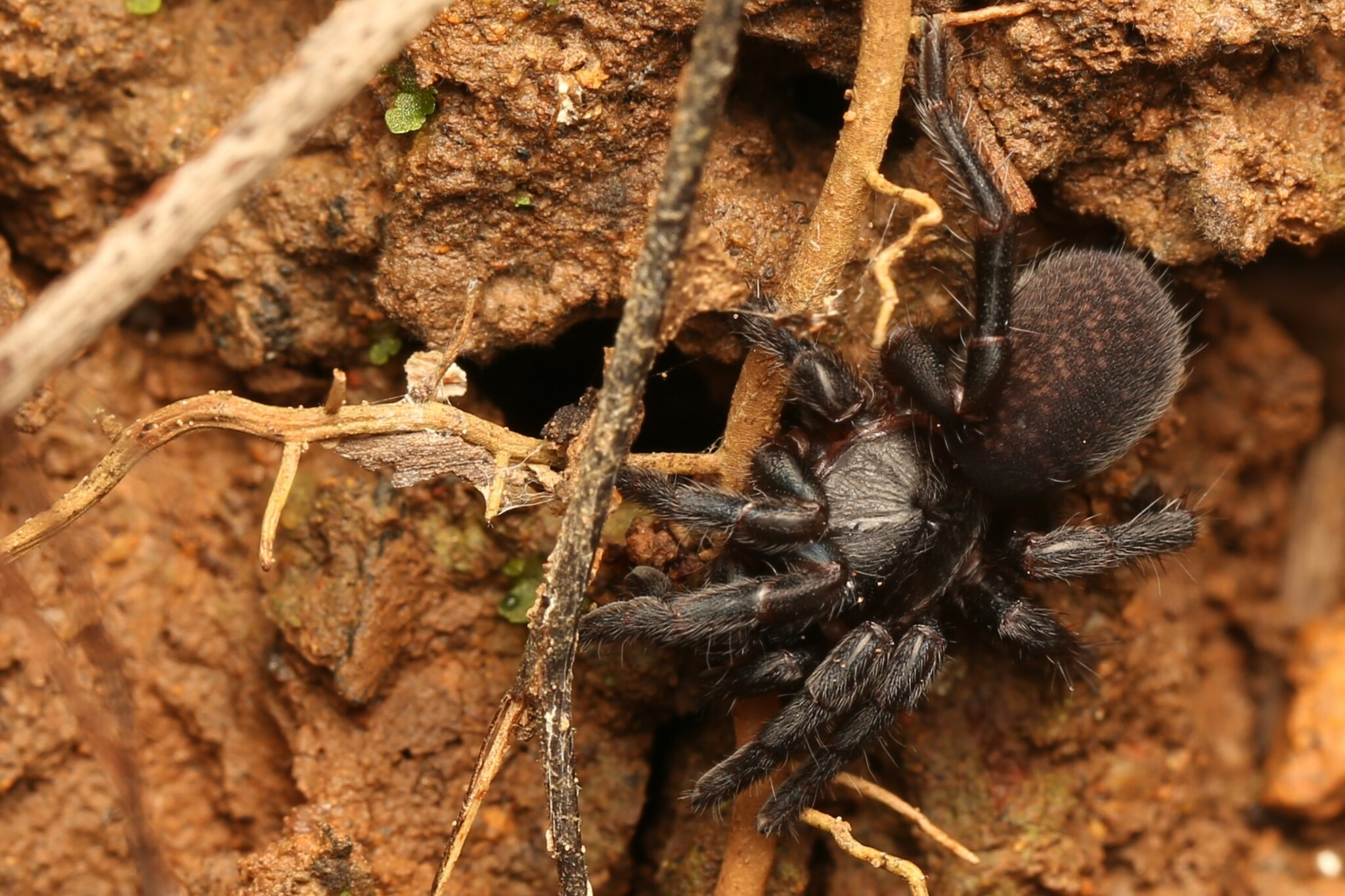

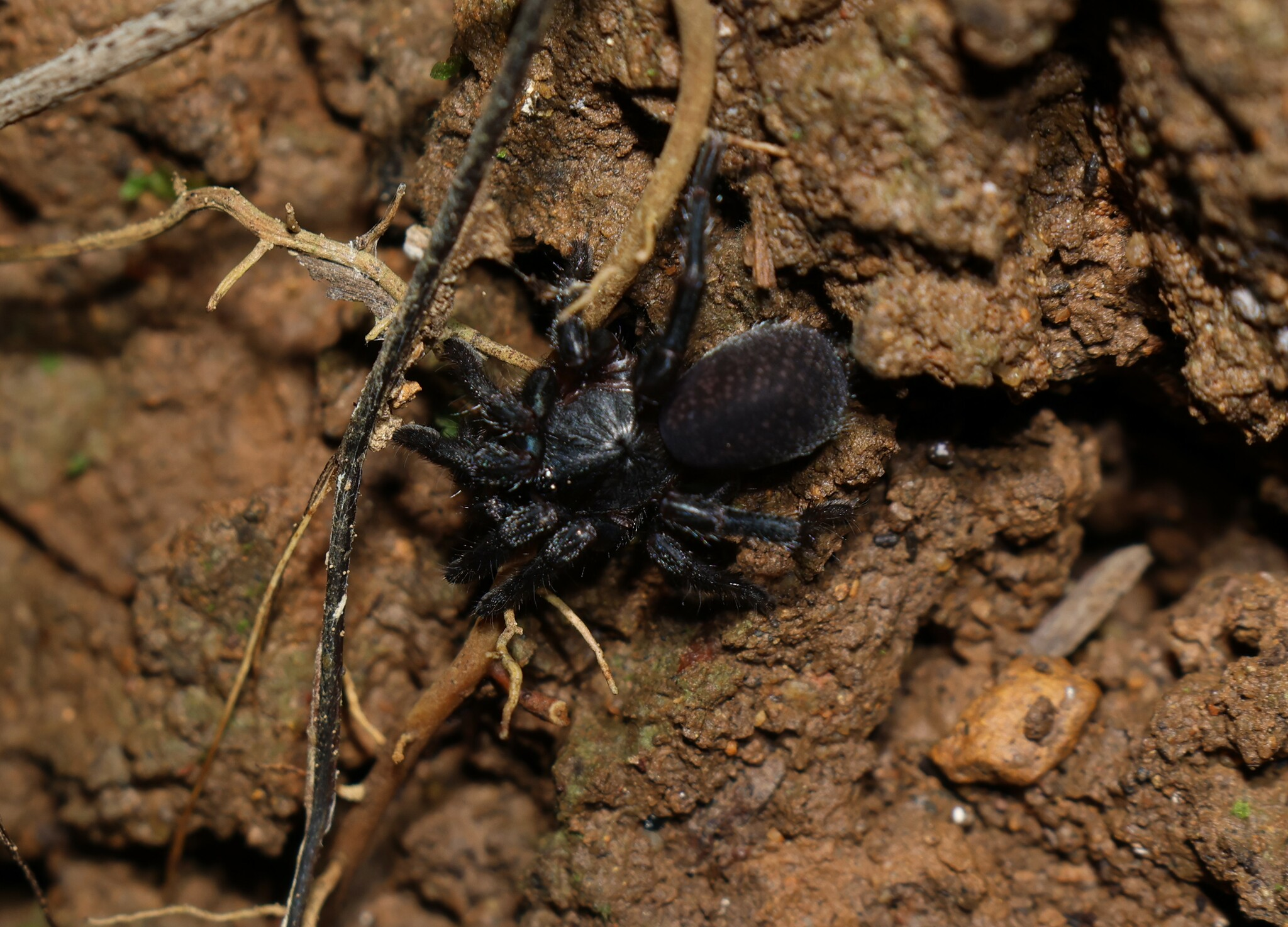

Scientific classification
- Kingdom: Animalia
- Phylum: Arthropoda
- Subphylum: Chelicerata
- Class: Arachnida
- Order: Araneae
- Infraorder: Mygalomorphae
- Family: Barychelidae
- Genus: Seqocrypta
- Species: S. hamlynharrisi

Binomial name
- Seqocrypta hamlynharrisi Raven & Churchill, 1994

= Seqocrypta hamlynharrisi =

Species of spider

Seqocrypta hamlynharrisi is a species of mygalomorph spider in the Barychelidae family. It is endemic to Australia. It was described in 1994 by Australian arachnologists Robert Raven and Tracey Churchill. The specific epithet hamlynharrisi honours Ronald Hamlyn-Harris (1874–1953), a director of the Queensland Museum who modernised the data storage and retrieval system of the research collections.

== Distribution and habitat ==
The species occurs in south-eastern Queensland, in rainforest habitats. The type locality is Upper Tallebudgera Creek in the Gold Coast hinterland.
