= Aurecocrypta katersi =

Scientific classification
- Kingdom: Animalia
- Phylum: Arthropoda
- Subphylum: Chelicerata
- Class: Arachnida
- Order: Araneae
- Infraorder: Mygalomorphae
- Family: Barychelidae
- Genus: Aurecocrypta
- Species: A. katersi

Binomial name
- Aurecocrypta katersi Raven, 1994

Species of spider

Aurecocrypta katersi, also known as the Katers Island brush-footed trapdoor spider, is a species of mygalomorph spider in the Barychelidae family. It is endemic to Australia. It was described in 1994 by Australian arachnologist Robert Raven.

== Distribution and habitat ==
The species occurs in Western Australia.
