= Synothele pectinata =

Scientific classification
- Kingdom: Animalia
- Phylum: Arthropoda
- Subphylum: Chelicerata
- Class: Arachnida
- Order: Araneae
- Infraorder: Mygalomorphae
- Family: Barychelidae
- Genus: Synothele
- Species: S. pectinata

Binomial name
- Synothele pectinata Raven, 1994

Species of spider

Synothele pectinata is a species of mygalomorph spider in the Barychelidae family. It is endemic to Australia. It was described in 1994 by Australian arachnologist Robert Raven. The specific epithet pectinata comes from the Latin "pecten" (‘comb’), with reference to the comb-like thorn spines on the spider's legs.

== Distribution and habitat ==
The species occurs in the arid Goldfields region of south-east Western Australia in gimlet woodland habitats. The type locality is Woodline, 24 km north-east of Kalgoorlie.
