= Synothele =

Scientific classification
- Kingdom: Animalia
- Phylum: Arthropoda
- Subphylum: Chelicerata
- Class: Arachnida
- Order: Araneae
- Infraorder: Mygalomorphae
- Family: Barychelidae
- Genus: Synothele; Simon, 1908

Type species
- S. michaelseni Simon, 1908

Species
- 24, see text

Genus of spiders

Synothele is a genus of Australian brushed trapdoor spiders first described by Eugène Simon in 1908. The number of species in the genera was greatly expanded by Robert Raven in 1994.

== Species ==
As of April 2019 it contained twenty-four species from South Australia (SA) or Western Australia (WA):

- Synothele arrakis Raven, 1994 – WA
- Synothele boongaree Raven, 1994 – WA
- Synothele butleri Raven, 1994 – WA
- Synothele durokoppin Raven, 1994 – WA
- Synothele goongarrie Raven, 1994 – WA
- Synothele harveyi Churchill & Raven, 1994 – WA
- Synothele houstoni Raven, 1994 – WA
- Synothele howi Raven, 1994 – WA
- Synothele karara Raven, 1994 – WA
- Synothele koonalda Raven, 1994 – SA
- Synothele longbottomi Raven, 1994 – WA
- Synothele lowei Raven, 1994 – WA
- Synothele meadhunteri Raven, 1994 – SA, WA
- Synothele michaelseni Simon, 1908 (type) – WA
- Synothele moonabie Raven, 1994 – SA
- Synothele mullaloo Raven, 1994 – WA
- Synothele ooldea Raven, 1994 – SA
- Synothele parifusca (Main, 1954) – WA
- Synothele pectinata Raven, 1994 – WA
- Synothele rastelloides Raven, 1994 – WA
- Synothele rubripes Raven, 1994 – WA
- Synothele subquadrata Raven, 1994 – WA
- Synothele taurus Raven, 1994 – WA
- Synothele yundamindra Raven, 1994 – WA
