= Tungari kenwayae =

Scientific classification
- Kingdom: Animalia
- Phylum: Arthropoda
- Subphylum: Chelicerata
- Class: Arachnida
- Order: Araneae
- Infraorder: Mygalomorphae
- Family: Barychelidae
- Genus: Tungari
- Species: T. kenwayae

Binomial name
- Tungari kenwayae Raven, 1994

Species of spider

Tungari kenwayae is a species of mygalomorph spider in the Barychelidae family. It is endemic to Australia. It was described in 1994 by Australian arachnologist Robert Raven. The specific epithet kenwayae honours Marina Kenway, whose interest in spiders yielded the holotype.

== Distribution and habitat ==
The species occurs in the Cape York Peninsula of Far North Queensland in rainforest habitats. The type locality is King Park Station in the Iron Range. It has also been recorded from Lamond Hill, near Lockhart River.
