= Adelonychia =

Scientific classification
- Kingdom: Animalia
- Phylum: Arthropoda
- Subphylum: Chelicerata
- Class: Arachnida
- Order: Araneae
- Infraorder: Mygalomorphae
- Family: Barychelidae
- Genus: Adelonychia; O. Pickard-Cambridge, 1890

Type species
- Adelonychia walshi O. Pickard-Cambridge, 1890

Species
- See text.

Genus of spiders

Adelonychia is a genus of mygalomorph spider in the family Barychelidae, containing four species restricted to India and Sri Lanka. It formerly belonged in the genus Diplothele.

== Species ==
As of January 2022, the World Spider Catalog accepted the following species:

- Adelonychia gravelyi Siliwal, Molur & Raven, 2009 – India
- Adelonychia halyi Simon, 1892 – Sri Lanka
- Adelonychia tenebrosus Siliwal, Molur & Raven, 2009 – India
- Adelonychia walshi O. Pickard-Cambridge, 1890 – India
