= Moruga wallaceae =

Scientific classification
- Kingdom: Animalia
- Phylum: Arthropoda
- Subphylum: Chelicerata
- Class: Arachnida
- Order: Araneae
- Infraorder: Mygalomorphae
- Family: Barychelidae
- Genus: Moruga
- Species: M. wallaceae

Binomial name
- Moruga wallaceae Raven, 1994

Species of spider

Moruga wallaceae is a species of mygalomorph spider in the Barychelidae family. It is endemic to Australia. It was described in 1994 by Australian arachnologist Robert Raven. The specific epithet wallaceae honours Carden Wallace, Curator Manager of the Museum of Tropical Queensland.

== Distribution and habitat ==
The species occurs in the Cassowary Coast Region of Far North Queensland, in dry open forest habitats. The type locality is South Johnstone.
