= Ammonius pupulus =

Scientific classification
- Kingdom: Animalia
- Phylum: Arthropoda
- Subphylum: Chelicerata
- Class: Arachnida
- Order: Araneae
- Infraorder: Mygalomorphae
- Family: Barychelidae
- Genus: Ammonius
- Species: A. pupulus

Binomial name
- Ammonius pupulus Thorell, 1899

Genus of spiders

Ammonius pupulus is a species of Central African brushed trapdoor spiders. It is the only species in the genus Ammonius . It was first described by Tamerlan Thorell in 1899, and has only been found in Cameroon.
