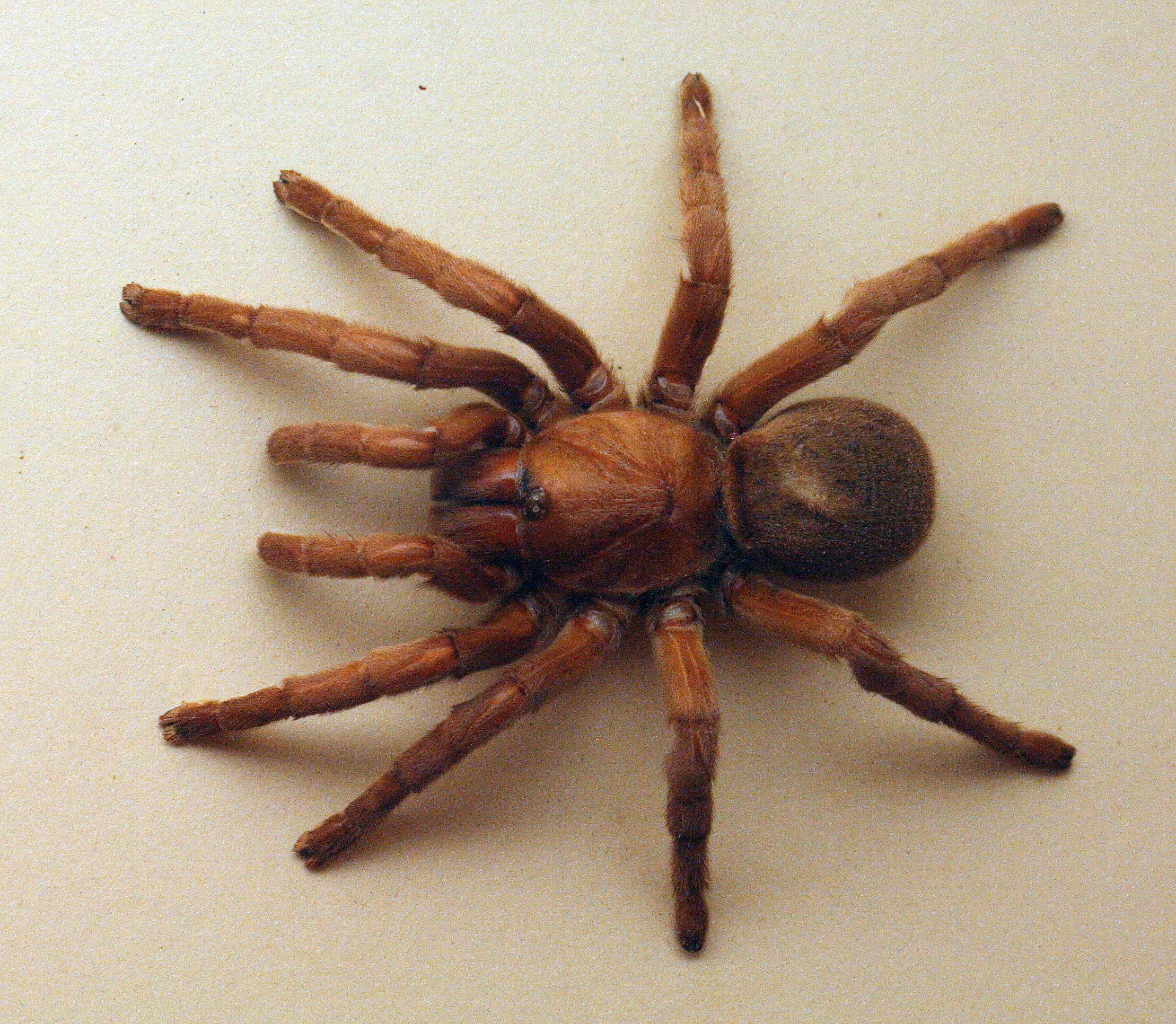

Scientific classification
- Kingdom: Animalia
- Phylum: Arthropoda
- Subphylum: Chelicerata
- Class: Arachnida
- Order: Araneae
- Infraorder: Mygalomorphae
- Family: Barychelidae
- Genus: Idiommata
- Species: I. iridescens

Binomial name
- Idiommata iridescens (Rainbow & Pulleine, 1918)

Synonyms
- Lampropodus iridescens Rainbow & Pulleine, 1918

= Idiommata iridescens =

Species of spider

Idiommata iridescens is a species of mygalomorph spider in the Barychelidae family. It is endemic to Australia. It was described in 1918 by Australian arachnologists William Joseph Rainbow and Robert Henry Pulleine.

== Distribution and habitat ==
The species occurs in eastern Queensland in open forest habitats. The type locality is Eidsvold in the North Burnett Region.

== Behaviour ==
The spiders are fossorial, terrestrial predators.
