= Moruga insularis =

Scientific classification
- Kingdom: Animalia
- Phylum: Arthropoda
- Subphylum: Chelicerata
- Class: Arachnida
- Order: Araneae
- Infraorder: Mygalomorphae
- Family: Barychelidae
- Genus: Moruga
- Species: M. insularis

Binomial name
- Moruga insularis Raven, 1994

Species of spider

Moruga insularis is a species of mygalomorph spider in the Barychelidae family. It is endemic to Australia. It was described in 1994 by Australian arachnologist Robert Raven.

== Distribution and habitat ==
The species occurs on Hinchinbrook Island, in north-east Queensland, in rainforest habitats. The type locality is Gayundah Creek.
