= Synothele moonabie =

Scientific classification
- Kingdom: Animalia
- Phylum: Arthropoda
- Subphylum: Chelicerata
- Class: Arachnida
- Order: Araneae
- Infraorder: Mygalomorphae
- Family: Barychelidae
- Genus: Synothele
- Species: S. moonabie

Binomial name
- Synothele moonabie Raven, 1994

Species of spider

Synothele moonabie is a species of mygalomorph spider in the Barychelidae family. It is endemic to Australia. It was described in 1994 by Australian arachnologist Robert Raven. The specific epithet moonabie refers to the type locality.

== Distribution and habitat ==
The species occurs on eastern Eyre Peninsula in South Australia in mallee habitats. The type locality is 10 km south-west of Moonabie, or about 50 km south-west of Whyalla.
