= Psalistops =

Psalistops Temporal range: Neogene–present

Scientific classification
- Kingdom: Animalia
- Phylum: Arthropoda
- Subphylum: Chelicerata
- Class: Arachnida
- Order: Araneae
- Infraorder: Mygalomorphae
- Family: Theraphosidae
- Genus: Psalistops; Simon, 1889

Type species
- P. melanopygius Simon, 1889

Species
- 12, see text

Synonyms
- Epipedesis Simon, 1889

Genus of spiders

Psalistops is a genus of brushed trapdoor spiders first described by Eugène Simon in 1889.

== Species ==
As of April 2019 it contains twelve species in South America and the Caribbean:

- Psalistops fulvus Bryant, 1948 – Hispaniola
- Psalistops gasci Maréchal, 1996 – French Guiana
- Psalistops maculosus Bryant, 1948 – Hispaniola
- Psalistops melanopygius Simon, 1889 (type) – Venezuela
- Psalistops montigena (Simon, 1889) – Venezuela
- Psalistops nigrifemuratus Mello-Leitão, 1939 – Brazil
- Psalistops opifex (Simon, 1889) – Venezuela
- Psalistops solitarius (Simon, 1889) – Venezuela
- Psalistops steini (Simon, 1889) – Venezuela
- Psalistops tigrinus Simon, 1889 – Venezuela
- Psalistops venadensis Valerio, 1986 – Costa Rica
- Psalistops zonatus Simon, 1889 – Venezuela
