= Synothele parifusca =

Scientific classification
- Kingdom: Animalia
- Phylum: Arthropoda
- Subphylum: Chelicerata
- Class: Arachnida
- Order: Araneae
- Infraorder: Mygalomorphae
- Family: Barychelidae
- Genus: Synothele
- Species: S. parifusca

Binomial name
- Synothele parifusca (Main, 1954)

Synonyms
- Encyocrypta parifusca Main, 1954

Species of spider

Synothele parifusca is a species of mygalomorph spider in the Barychelidae family. It is endemic to Australia. It was described in 1954 by Australian arachnologist Barbara York Main.

== Distribution and habitat ==
The species occurs in the Recherche Archipelago, off the south coast of Western Australia. The type locality is Mondrain Island.

== Behaviour ==
The spiders are fossorial, terrestrial predators.
