= Moruga thorsborneorum =

Scientific classification
- Kingdom: Animalia
- Phylum: Arthropoda
- Subphylum: Chelicerata
- Class: Arachnida
- Order: Araneae
- Infraorder: Mygalomorphae
- Family: Barychelidae
- Genus: Moruga
- Species: M. thorsborneorum

Binomial name
- Moruga thorsborneorum Raven, 1994

Species of spider

Moruga thorsborneorum is a species of mygalomorph spider in the Barychelidae family. It is endemic to Australia. It was described in 1994 by Australian arachnologist Robert Raven. The specific epithet thorsborneorum honours Australian conservationists Arthur and Margaret Thorsborne, whose activism contributed to the establishment of many nature reserves in northern Queensland.

== Distribution and habitat ==
The species occurs in the Wet Tropics of Far North Queensland, in rainforest habitats. The type locality is the eastern base of Mount Bellenden Ker.
