= Tungari monteithi =

Scientific classification
- Kingdom: Animalia
- Phylum: Arthropoda
- Subphylum: Chelicerata
- Class: Arachnida
- Order: Araneae
- Infraorder: Mygalomorphae
- Family: Barychelidae
- Genus: Tungari
- Species: T. monteithi

Binomial name
- Tungari monteithi Raven, 1994

Species of spider

Tungari monteithi is a species of mygalomorph spider in the Barychelidae family. It is endemic to Australia. It was described in 1994 by Australian arachnologist Robert Raven. The specific epithet monteithi honours Geoffrey Monteith, Senior Curator (Lower Entomology) at the Queensland Museum, for his collecting skills.

== Distribution and habitat ==
The species occurs on the Cape York Peninsula of Far North Queensland, in closed riverine forest habitats. The type locality is Gunshot Creek.
