= Tungari =

Scientific classification
- Kingdom: Animalia
- Phylum: Arthropoda
- Subphylum: Chelicerata
- Class: Arachnida
- Order: Araneae
- Infraorder: Mygalomorphae
- Family: Barychelidae
- Genus: Tungari; Raven, 1994

Type species
- T. kenwayae Raven, 1994

Species
- 4, see text

Genus of spiders

Tungari is a genus of brushed trapdoor spiders first described by Robert Raven in 1994. It is endemic to Australia. The name comes from an Aboriginal term meaning "song".

== Species ==
As of April 2019 the genus contained four species, all from the Cape York Peninsula region of Far North Queensland:

- Tungari aurukun Raven, 1994
- Tungari kenwayae Raven, 1994 (type)
- Tungari mascordi Raven, 1994
- Tungari monteithi Raven, 1994
