= Synothele howi =

Scientific classification
- Kingdom: Animalia
- Phylum: Arthropoda
- Subphylum: Chelicerata
- Class: Arachnida
- Order: Araneae
- Infraorder: Mygalomorphae
- Family: Barychelidae
- Genus: Synothele
- Species: S. howi

Binomial name
- Synothele howi Raven, 1994

Species of spider

Synothele howi is a species of mygalomorph spider in the Barychelidae family. It is endemic to Australia. It was described in 1994 by Australian arachnologist Robert Raven. The specific epithet howi honours Ric How, Curator of the Survey Department at the Western Australian Museum.

== Distribution and habitat ==
The species occurs in the Goldfields–Esperance region of southern inland Western Australia in salmon gum woodland. The type locality is Bungalbin Hill in the Helena and Aurora Range.
