= Idioctis xmas =

Scientific classification
- Kingdom: Animalia
- Phylum: Arthropoda
- Subphylum: Chelicerata
- Class: Arachnida
- Order: Araneae
- Infraorder: Mygalomorphae
- Family: Barychelidae
- Genus: Idioctis
- Species: I. xmas

Binomial name
- Idioctis xmas Raven, 1988

Species of spider

Idioctis xmas is a species of mygalomorph spider in the Barychelidae family. It is endemic to Australia. It was described in 1988 by Australian arachnologist Robert Raven. The specific epithet xmas is an abbreviation for ‘Christmas’, with reference to the type locality.

== Distribution and habitat ==
The species has only been recorded from Christmas Island, an Australian territory in the eastern Indian Ocean. The female holotype was found in intertidal habitat, on the beach or coastal pinnacles.
