= Thalerommata =

Scientific classification
- Domain: Eukaryota
- Kingdom: Animalia
- Phylum: Arthropoda
- Subphylum: Chelicerata
- Class: Arachnida
- Order: Araneae
- Infraorder: Mygalomorphae
- Family: Theraphosidae
- Genus: Thalerommata; Ausserer, 1875

Type species
- T. gracilis Ausserer, 1875

Species
- 8, see text

Synonyms
- Aphantopelma Simon, 1903; Zygopelma Chamberlin & Ivie, 1938

Genus of spiders

Thalerommata is a genus of brushed trapdoor spiders, first described by Anton Ausserer in 1875.

== Species ==
As of June 2023, it contains eight species:

- Thalerommata gertschi Bertani & Raven, 2023 — Bahamas
- Thalerommata gracilis Ausserer, 1875 (type) — Colombia
- Thalerommata huila Bertani & Raven, 2023 — Colombia
- Thalerommata macella (Simon, 1903) — Colombia
- Thalerommata maculata Bertani & Raven, 2023 — Venezuela
- Thalerommata pecki Bertani & Raven, 2023 — Jamaica
- Thalerommata splendens Bertani & Raven, 2023 — Jamaica
- Thalerommata squamea Bertani & Raven, 2023 — Colombia
