= Moruga doddi =

Scientific classification
- Kingdom: Animalia
- Phylum: Arthropoda
- Subphylum: Chelicerata
- Class: Arachnida
- Order: Araneae
- Infraorder: Mygalomorphae
- Family: Barychelidae
- Genus: Moruga
- Species: M. doddi

Binomial name
- Moruga doddi Raven, 1994

Species of spider

Moruga doddi is a species of mygalomorph spider in the Barychelidae family. It is endemic to Australia. It was described in 1994 by Australian arachnologist Robert Raven.

== Distribution and habitat ==
The species occurs in north-east Queensland. The type locality is Mount Cleveland, Bowling Green Bay National Park, near Townsville, where the habitat is Xanthorrhoea–Casuarina woodland, on rocky soils with granite boulders, and patches of grassland and rainforest.
