= Zophorame gallonae =

Scientific classification
- Kingdom: Animalia
- Phylum: Arthropoda
- Subphylum: Chelicerata
- Class: Arachnida
- Order: Araneae
- Infraorder: Mygalomorphae
- Family: Barychelidae
- Genus: Zophorame
- Species: Z. gallonae

Binomial name
- Zophorame gallonae Raven, 1990

Species of spider

Zophorame gallonae is a species of mygalomorph spider in the Barychelidae family. It is endemic to Australia. It was described in 1990 by Australian arachnologist Robert Raven.

== Distribution and habitat ==
The species occurs on Queensland's Horn and Thursday Islands in Torres Strait, in open eucalypt forest habitats. The type locality is Horn Island.
