= Synothele rubripes =

Scientific classification
- Kingdom: Animalia
- Phylum: Arthropoda
- Subphylum: Chelicerata
- Class: Arachnida
- Order: Araneae
- Infraorder: Mygalomorphae
- Family: Barychelidae
- Genus: Synothele
- Species: S. rubripes

Binomial name
- Synothele rubripes Raven, 1994

Species of spider

Synothele rubripes is a species of mygalomorph spider in the Barychelidae family. It is endemic to Australia. It was described in 1994 by Australian arachnologist Robert Raven. The specific epithet rubripes comes from the Latin for "red legs", referring to the spiders’ reddish tarsi.

== Distribution and habitat ==
The species occurs in south-west Western Australia. The type locality is 16 km south of Dwellingup on the Darling Scarp.
