= Synothele boongaree =

Scientific classification
- Kingdom: Animalia
- Phylum: Arthropoda
- Subphylum: Chelicerata
- Class: Arachnida
- Order: Araneae
- Infraorder: Mygalomorphae
- Family: Barychelidae
- Genus: Synothele
- Species: S. boongaree

Binomial name
- Synothele boongaree Raven, 1994

Species of spider

Synothele boongaree is a species of mygalomorph spider in the Barychelidae family. It is endemic to Australia. It was described in 1994 by Australian arachnologist Robert Raven. The specific epithet boongaree refers to the type locality.

== Distribution and habitat ==
The species occurs in the Kimberley region of north-west Western Australia. The type locality is Boongaree Island at the southern end of the Bonaparte Archipelago.
