= Synothele yundamindra =

Scientific classification
- Kingdom: Animalia
- Phylum: Arthropoda
- Subphylum: Chelicerata
- Class: Arachnida
- Order: Araneae
- Infraorder: Mygalomorphae
- Family: Barychelidae
- Genus: Synothele
- Species: S. yundamindra

Binomial name
- Synothele yundamindra Raven, 1994

Species of spider

Synothele yundamindra is a species of mygalomorph spider in the Barychelidae family. It is endemic to Australia. It was described in 1994 by Australian arachnologist Robert Raven. The specific epithet yundamindra refers to the type locality.

== Distribution and habitat ==
The species occurs in the Goldfields–Esperance region of Western Australia in mallee and woodland dominated by mulga and Triodia, or mulga and lignum, habitats. The type locality is Yundamindera, about 180 km north of Kalgoorlie.
