= Zophorame simoni =

Scientific classification
- Kingdom: Animalia
- Phylum: Arthropoda
- Subphylum: Chelicerata
- Class: Arachnida
- Order: Araneae
- Infraorder: Mygalomorphae
- Family: Barychelidae
- Genus: Zophorame
- Species: Z. simoni

Binomial name
- Zophorame simoni Raven, 1990

Species of spider

Zophorame simoni is a species of mygalomorph spider in the Barychelidae family. It is endemic to Australia. It was described in 1990 by Australian arachnologist Robert Raven.

== Distribution and habitat ==
The species occurs in Far North Queensland, in rainforest habitats. It has been recorded from Mount Cook National Park as well as the Windsor Tablelands near Cape Tribulation.
