= Zophorame =

Scientific classification
- Kingdom: Animalia
- Phylum: Arthropoda
- Subphylum: Chelicerata
- Class: Arachnida
- Order: Araneae
- Infraorder: Mygalomorphae
- Family: Barychelidae
- Genus: Zophorame; Raven, 1990

Type species
- Z. simoni Raven, 1990

Species
- 4, see text

Genus of spiders

Zophorame is a genus of brushed trapdoor spiders first described by Robert Raven in 1990. It is endemic to Australia.

== Species ==
As of April 2019 the genus contained four species, all from north-east Queensland:

- Zophorame covacevichae Raven, 1994
- Zophorame gallonae Raven, 1990
- Zophorame hirsti Raven, 1994
- Zophorame simoni Raven, 1990 (type)
