= Synothele taurus =

Scientific classification
- Kingdom: Animalia
- Phylum: Arthropoda
- Subphylum: Chelicerata
- Class: Arachnida
- Order: Araneae
- Infraorder: Mygalomorphae
- Family: Barychelidae
- Genus: Synothele
- Species: S. taurus

Binomial name
- Synothele taurus Raven, 1994

Species of spider

Synothele taurus is a species of mygalomorph spider in the Barychelidae family. It is endemic to Australia. It was described in 1994 by Australian arachnologist Robert Raven. The specific epithet taurus, from the Latin for "bull", alludes to the type locality.

== Distribution and habitat ==
The species occurs in south-west Western Australia. The type locality is 19 km north of Bullsbrook, a northern suburb of Perth.
