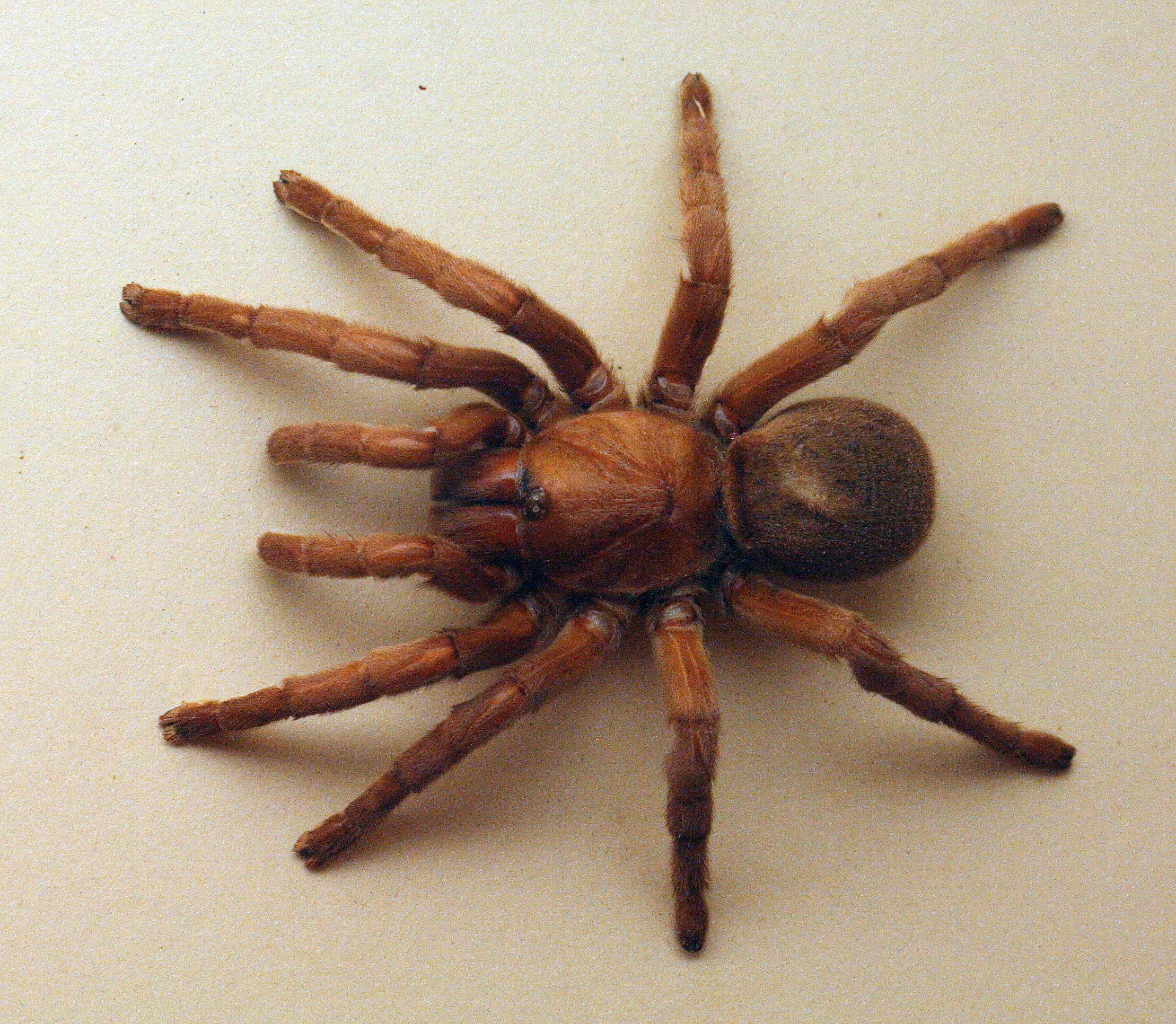
- I. iridescens

Scientific classification
- Kingdom: Animalia
- Phylum: Arthropoda
- Subphylum: Chelicerata
- Class: Arachnida
- Order: Araneae
- Infraorder: Mygalomorphae
- Family: Barychelidae
- Genus: Idiommata; Ausserer, 1871

Type species
- I. blackwalli (O. Pickard-Cambridge, 1870)

Species
- 4, see text

Synonyms
- Lampropodus

= Idiommata =

Genus of spiders

Idiommata is a genus of brushed trapdoor spiders first described by Anton Ausserer in 1871. It is endemic to Australia.

== Species ==
As of March 2019 it contained four species:

- Idiommata blackwalli (O. Pickard-Cambridge, 1870) — WA
- Idiommata fusca L. Koch, 1874 — QLD
- Idiommata iridescens (Rainbow & Pulleine, 1918) — QLD
- Idiommata scintillans (Rainbow & Pulleine, 1918) — SA
