= Synothele koonalda =

Scientific classification
- Kingdom: Animalia
- Phylum: Arthropoda
- Subphylum: Chelicerata
- Class: Arachnida
- Order: Araneae
- Infraorder: Mygalomorphae
- Family: Barychelidae
- Genus: Synothele
- Species: S. koonalda

Binomial name
- Synothele koonalda Raven, 1994

Species of spider

Synothele koonalda is a species of mygalomorph spider in the Barychelidae family. It is endemic to Australia. It was described in 1994 by Australian arachnologist Robert Raven. The specific epithet koonalda refers to the type locality.

== Distribution and habitat ==
The species occurs on the Nullarbor Plain in western South Australia. The type locality is 48 km south-east of Koonalda Station.
