= Sipalolasma humicola =

Conservation status
- Least Concern (SANBI Red List)

Scientific classification
- Kingdom: Animalia
- Phylum: Arthropoda
- Subphylum: Chelicerata
- Class: Arachnida
- Order: Araneae
- Infraorder: Mygalomorphae
- Family: Barychelidae
- Genus: Sipalolasma
- Species: S. humicola

Binomial name
- Sipalolasma humicola (Benoit, 1965)

Synonyms
- Cyclopelma humicola Benoit, 1965

Species of spider

Sipalolasma humicola is a species of spider in the genus Sipalolasma of the family Barychelidae. It is found from Ethiopia to South Africa.

== Distribution ==
Sipalolasma humicola has a wide African distribution, occurring in Ethiopia, Democratic Republic of the Congo, Zimbabwe, Mozambique, and South Africa. In South Africa, it is recorded from three provinces: Limpopo, Northern Cape, and North West Province.

In Limpopo, it has been found at several locations including Makalali Nature Reserve, Nylsvley Nature Reserve, Lhuvhondo Nature Reserve, Acacia Lodge Game Reserve near Thabazimbi, and Blouberg Nature Reserve. In Northern Cape, it occurs at Oorlogskloof Nature Reserve. In North West Province, it has been recorded from Broederstroom.

== Habitat and ecology ==
This species is a free-living burrow dweller. Males are frequently collected from pitfall traps in the Succulent Karoo and Savanna Biomes, indicating their active movement during certain periods, likely related to mating behavior.

== Conservation status ==
Sipalolasma humicola is listed as Least Concern by the South African National Biodiversity Institute (SANBI). Originally described from Mozambique in 1965, it has a wide geographical range with an extent of occurrence of 168,037 km² and area of occupancy of 28 km² at elevations ranging from 542-1341 meters above sea level. Due to its extensive range across multiple African countries, it is considered to be of low conservation concern.

The species is protected in six conservation areas in South Africa: Acacia Lodge Game Reserve, Luvhondo Nature Reserve, Makelali Nature Reserve, Nylsvley Nature Reserve, Blouberg Nature Reserve, and Oorlogskloof Nature Reserve. No specific conservation actions are recommended due to its wide distribution and presence in multiple protected areas.

== Description ==
Sipalolasma humicola is known only from females. The species exhibits the characteristic features of the genus Sipalolasma.

== Taxonomy ==
The species was originally described as Cyclopelma humicola by Benoit in 1965 but was later transferred to Sipalolasma when Cyclopelma was synonymized with Sipalolasma.
