= Moruga thickthorni =

Scientific classification
- Kingdom: Animalia
- Phylum: Arthropoda
- Subphylum: Chelicerata
- Class: Arachnida
- Order: Araneae
- Infraorder: Mygalomorphae
- Family: Barychelidae
- Genus: Moruga
- Species: M. thickthorni

Binomial name
- Moruga thickthorni Raven, 1994

Species of spider

Moruga thickthorni is a species of mygalomorph spider in the Barychelidae family. It is endemic to Australia. It was described in 1994 by Australian arachnologist Robert Raven. The specific epithet thickthorni honours Australian naturalist Charles Walter De Vis (1829–1915), who wrote many popular articles under the pen-name ‘Thickthorn’ before becoming the first Director of the Queensland Museum.

== Distribution and habitat ==
The species occurs in north-east Queensland, in dry open forest habitats. The type locality is Tully.
