= Synothele karara =

Scientific classification
- Kingdom: Animalia
- Phylum: Arthropoda
- Subphylum: Chelicerata
- Class: Arachnida
- Order: Araneae
- Infraorder: Mygalomorphae
- Family: Barychelidae
- Genus: Synothele
- Species: S. karara

Binomial name
- Synothele karara Raven, 1994

Species of spider

Synothele karara is a species of mygalomorph spider in the Barychelidae family. It is endemic to Australia. It was described in 1994 by Australian arachnologist Robert Raven. The specific epithet karara refers to the type locality.

== Distribution and habitat ==
The species occurs in the Pilbara region of northern Western Australia. The type locality is Karara Well (No.24 on the Canning Stock Route) in the Great Sandy Desert.
