= Synothele lowei =

Scientific classification
- Kingdom: Animalia
- Phylum: Arthropoda
- Subphylum: Chelicerata
- Class: Arachnida
- Order: Araneae
- Infraorder: Mygalomorphae
- Family: Barychelidae
- Genus: Synothele
- Species: S. lowei

Binomial name
- Synothele lowei Raven, 1994

Species of spider

Synothele lowei is a species of mygalomorph spider in the Barychelidae family. It is endemic to Australia. It was described in 1994 by Australian arachnologist Robert Raven. The specific epithet lowei honours G. H. Lowe, collector and contributor of specimens to the Western Australian Museum.

== Distribution and habitat ==
The species occurs in south-west Western Australia. The type locality is Bullsbrook, a northern suburb of Perth.
