= Idiommata blackwalli =

Scientific classification
- Kingdom: Animalia
- Phylum: Arthropoda
- Subphylum: Chelicerata
- Class: Arachnida
- Order: Araneae
- Infraorder: Mygalomorphae
- Family: Barychelidae
- Genus: Idiommata
- Species: I. blackwalli

Binomial name
- Idiommata blackwalli (O.Pickard-Cambridge, 1870)

Synonyms
- Idiops blackwalli O.Pickard-Cambridge, 1870; Idiops blackwallii O.Pickard-Cambridge, 1870

Species of spider

Idiommata blackwalli is a species of mygalomorph spider in the Barychelidae family. It is endemic to Australia. It was described in 1870 by British arachnologist Octavius Pickard-Cambridge.

== Distribution and habitat ==
The species occurs in west and south-west Western Australia in coastal dune, low open shrubland, woodland and open forest habitats. Its range includes Rottnest and Garden Islands, as well as the Houtman Abrolhos archipelago. The type locality is the Swan River in Perth.

== Behaviour ==
The spiders are fossorial, terrestrial predators. They construct burrows lined with parchment-like silk and closed with doors of toughened silk.
