= Aurecocrypta =

Scientific classification
- Domain: Eukaryota
- Kingdom: Animalia
- Phylum: Arthropoda
- Subphylum: Chelicerata
- Class: Arachnida
- Order: Araneae
- Infraorder: Mygalomorphae
- Family: Barychelidae
- Genus: Aurecocrypta; Raven, 1994

Type species
- A. lugubris Raven, 1994

Genus of spiders in Australia

Aurecocrypta is a genus of Australian brushed trapdoor spiders first described by Robert Raven in 1994. As of April 2019 it contained two species from Western Australia.

== Species ==
- Aurecocrypta katersi Raven, 1994
- Aurecocrypta lugubris Raven, 1994
