= Seqocrypta mckeowni =

Scientific classification
- Kingdom: Animalia
- Phylum: Arthropoda
- Subphylum: Chelicerata
- Class: Arachnida
- Order: Araneae
- Infraorder: Mygalomorphae
- Family: Barychelidae
- Genus: Seqocrypta
- Species: S. mckeowni

Binomial name
- Seqocrypta mckeowni Raven, 1994

Species of spider

Seqocrypta mckeowni is a species of mygalomorph spider in the Barychelidae family. It is endemic to Australia. It was described in 1994 by Australian arachnologist Robert Raven. The specific epithet mckeowni honours Keith McKeown, assistant curator at the Australian Museum, for his contributions to arachnology.

== Distribution and habitat ==
The species occurs in the New England region of north-eastern New South Wales in rainforest habitats. The type locality is Sherrard Falls in the Dorrigo National Park.
