= Synothele harveyi =

Scientific classification
- Kingdom: Animalia
- Phylum: Arthropoda
- Subphylum: Chelicerata
- Class: Arachnida
- Order: Araneae
- Infraorder: Mygalomorphae
- Family: Barychelidae
- Genus: Synothele
- Species: S. harveyi

Binomial name
- Synothele harveyi Churchill & Raven, 1994

Species of spider

Synothele harveyi is a species of mygalomorph spider in the Barychelidae family. It is endemic to Australia. It was described in 1994 by Australian arachnologists Tracey Churchill and Robert Raven. The specific epithet harveyi honours Mark Harvey, Curator of Arachnids at the Western Australian Museum.

== Distribution and habitat ==
The species occurs in south-west Western Australia in marri and jarrah woodland on lateritic soils. The type locality is Mount Cooke, south-east of Perth on the Darling Scarp.
