= Seqocrypta bancrofti =

Scientific classification
- Kingdom: Animalia
- Phylum: Arthropoda
- Subphylum: Chelicerata
- Class: Arachnida
- Order: Araneae
- Infraorder: Mygalomorphae
- Family: Barychelidae
- Genus: Seqocrypta
- Species: S. bancrofti

Binomial name
- Seqocrypta bancrofti Raven, 1994

Species of spider

Seqocrypta bancrofti is a species of mygalomorph spider in the Barychelidae family. It is endemic to Australia. It was described in 1994 by Australian arachnologist Robert Raven. The specific epithet bancrofti honours Australian medical naturalist Thomas Lane Bancroft in recognition of his contributions to natural science.

== Distribution and habitat ==
The species occurs in north-eastern New South Wales in rainforest habitats. The type locality is Poverty Creek, near Tenterfield.
