= Synothele ooldea =

Scientific classification
- Kingdom: Animalia
- Phylum: Arthropoda
- Subphylum: Chelicerata
- Class: Arachnida
- Order: Araneae
- Infraorder: Mygalomorphae
- Family: Barychelidae
- Genus: Synothele
- Species: S. ooldea

Binomial name
- Synothele ooldea Raven, 1994

Species of spider

Synothele ooldea is a species of mygalomorph spider in the Barychelidae family. It is endemic to Australia. It was described in 1994 by Australian arachnologist Robert Raven. The specific epithet ooldea refers to the type locality.

== Distribution and habitat ==
The species occurs in South Australia. The type locality is Ooldea, at the eastern end of the Nullarbor Plain.
