= Synothele mullaloo =

Scientific classification
- Kingdom: Animalia
- Phylum: Arthropoda
- Subphylum: Chelicerata
- Class: Arachnida
- Order: Araneae
- Infraorder: Mygalomorphae
- Family: Barychelidae
- Genus: Synothele
- Species: S. mullaloo

Binomial name
- Synothele mullaloo Raven, 1994

Species of spider

Synothele mullaloo is a species of mygalomorph spider in the Barychelidae family. It is endemic to Australia. It was described in 1994 by Australian arachnologist Robert Raven. The specific epithet mullaloo refers to the type locality.

== Distribution and habitat ==
The species occurs in south-west Western Australia. The type locality is Mullaloo Beach, in northern suburban Perth.
