= Zophorame hirsti =

Scientific classification
- Kingdom: Animalia
- Phylum: Arthropoda
- Subphylum: Chelicerata
- Class: Arachnida
- Order: Araneae
- Infraorder: Mygalomorphae
- Family: Barychelidae
- Genus: Zophorame
- Species: Z. hirsti

Binomial name
- Zophorame hirsti Raven, 1994

Species of spider

Zophorame hirsti is a species of mygalomorph spider in the Barychelidae family. It is endemic to Australia. It was described in 1994 by Australian arachnologist Robert Raven. The specific epithet hirsti honours David Hirst, Arachnologist at the South Australian Museum, for his research on heteropodid spider taxonomy.

== Distribution and habitat ==
The species occurs in Far North Queensland, in open forest habitats. The type locality is the Tinaroo Dam on the Atherton Tableland.
