= Synothele arrakis =

Scientific classification
- Kingdom: Animalia
- Phylum: Arthropoda
- Subphylum: Chelicerata
- Class: Arachnida
- Order: Araneae
- Infraorder: Mygalomorphae
- Family: Barychelidae
- Genus: Synothele
- Species: S. arrakis

Binomial name
- Synothele arrakis Raven, 1994

Species of spider

Synothele arrakis is a species of mygalomorph spider in the Barychelidae family. It is endemic to Australia. It was described in 1994 by Australian arachnologist Robert Raven. The specific epithet arrakis comes from the name of a desert planet in the Frank Herbert 1965 novel Dune, the inhabitants of which have deep blue eyes, alluding to the unusual deep blue colour of the spider's anterior median eyes.

== Distribution and habitat ==
The species occurs in arid south-east Western Australia, in mallee scrub habitats. The type locality is Buningonia Spring east of Kalgoorlie.
