= Moruga (spider) =

Scientific classification
- Kingdom: Animalia
- Phylum: Arthropoda
- Subphylum: Chelicerata
- Class: Arachnida
- Order: Araneae
- Infraorder: Mygalomorphae
- Family: Barychelidae
- Genus: Moruga; Raven, 1994

Type species
- M. thickthorni Raven, 1994

Species
- 8, see text

Genus of spiders

Moruga is a genus of Australian brushed trapdoor spiders, found in the states of Queensland (QLD) or Western Australia (WA), that was first described by arachnologist Robert Raven in 1994.

== Species ==
As of April 2019 the genus contained eight species:

- Moruga doddi Raven, 1994 — QLD
- Moruga fuliginea (Thorell, 1881) — QLD
- Moruga heatherae Raven, 1994 — QLD
- Moruga insularis Raven, 1994 — QLD
- Moruga kimberleyi Raven, 1994 — WA
- Moruga thickthorni Raven, 1994 — QLD
- Moruga thorsborneorum Raven, 1994 — QLD
- Moruga wallaceae Raven, 1994 — QLD
