= Seqocrypta jakara =

Scientific classification
- Kingdom: Animalia
- Phylum: Arthropoda
- Subphylum: Chelicerata
- Class: Arachnida
- Order: Araneae
- Infraorder: Mygalomorphae
- Family: Barychelidae
- Genus: Seqocrypta
- Species: S. jakara

Binomial name
- Seqocrypta jakara Raven, 1994

Species of spider

Seqocrypta jakara is a species of mygalomorph spider in the Barychelidae family. It is endemic to Australia. It was described in 1994 by Australian arachnologist Robert Raven. The specific epithet jakara is an Aboriginal term for the region in which the species is found.

== Distribution and habitat ==
The species occurs in south-eastern Queensland, extending into north-eastern New South Wales, in open and closed forest habitats. It is widespread in the Brisbane area. The type locality is Acacia Ridge, a southern suburb of Brisbane.
