= Sipalolasma =

Scientific classification
- Kingdom: Animalia
- Phylum: Arthropoda
- Subphylum: Chelicerata
- Class: Arachnida
- Order: Araneae
- Infraorder: Mygalomorphae
- Family: Barychelidae
- Genus: Sipalolasma; Simon, 1892

Type species
- S. ellioti Simon, 1892

Species
- 9, see text

Synonyms
- Cyclopelma Benoit, 1965

Genus of spiders

Sipalolasma is a genus of brushed trapdoor spiders first described by Eugène Simon in 1892. It is restricted to South Asia and parts of Africa.

== Description ==
Sipalolasma humicola, the South African representative, has a total length of 7 mm. The carapace is longer than wide, and the maxillae bear 6 spicules at the lower edge. The ocular group is separated from the anterior edge by the diameter of the anterior median eyes. The posterior eye row is slightly procurved, and the ocular group is wider than long.

The anterior lateral eyes are the largest, while the anterior median eyes are the same size as the posterior lateral eyes. The lateral eyes are separated by less than the large diameter of the posterior lateral eyes. The fovea is reduced to a circular pit. The opisthosoma is hirsute, and there are four spinnerets with the terminal segment of the posterior spinnerets being shorter than the penultimate segment.

== Behavior and ecology ==
Sipalolasma species are free-living burrow dwellers. Little is known about their natural history apart from the fact that S. humicola males are collected in pit traps in South Africa.

== Distribution and species ==
The genus has representatives in Africa and Asia. The African genera of Barychelidae have not been revised.

== Species ==
As of September 2025 it contains eight species:

- Sipalolasma aedificatrix Abraham, 1924 – Singapore
- Sipalolasma arthrapophysis (Gravely, 1915) – India
- Sipalolasma bicalcarata (Simon, 1904) – Ethiopia
- Sipalolasma ellioti Simon, 1892 – Sri Lanka
- Sipalolasma greeni Pocock, 1900 – Sri Lanka
- Sipalolasma humicola (Benoit, 1965) – Ethiopia, Democratic Republic of the Congo, Zimbabwe, Mozambique, South Africa
- Sipalolasma ophiriensis Abraham, 1924 – Malaysia
- Sipalolasma warnantae Benoit, 1966 – Democratic Republic of the Congo
