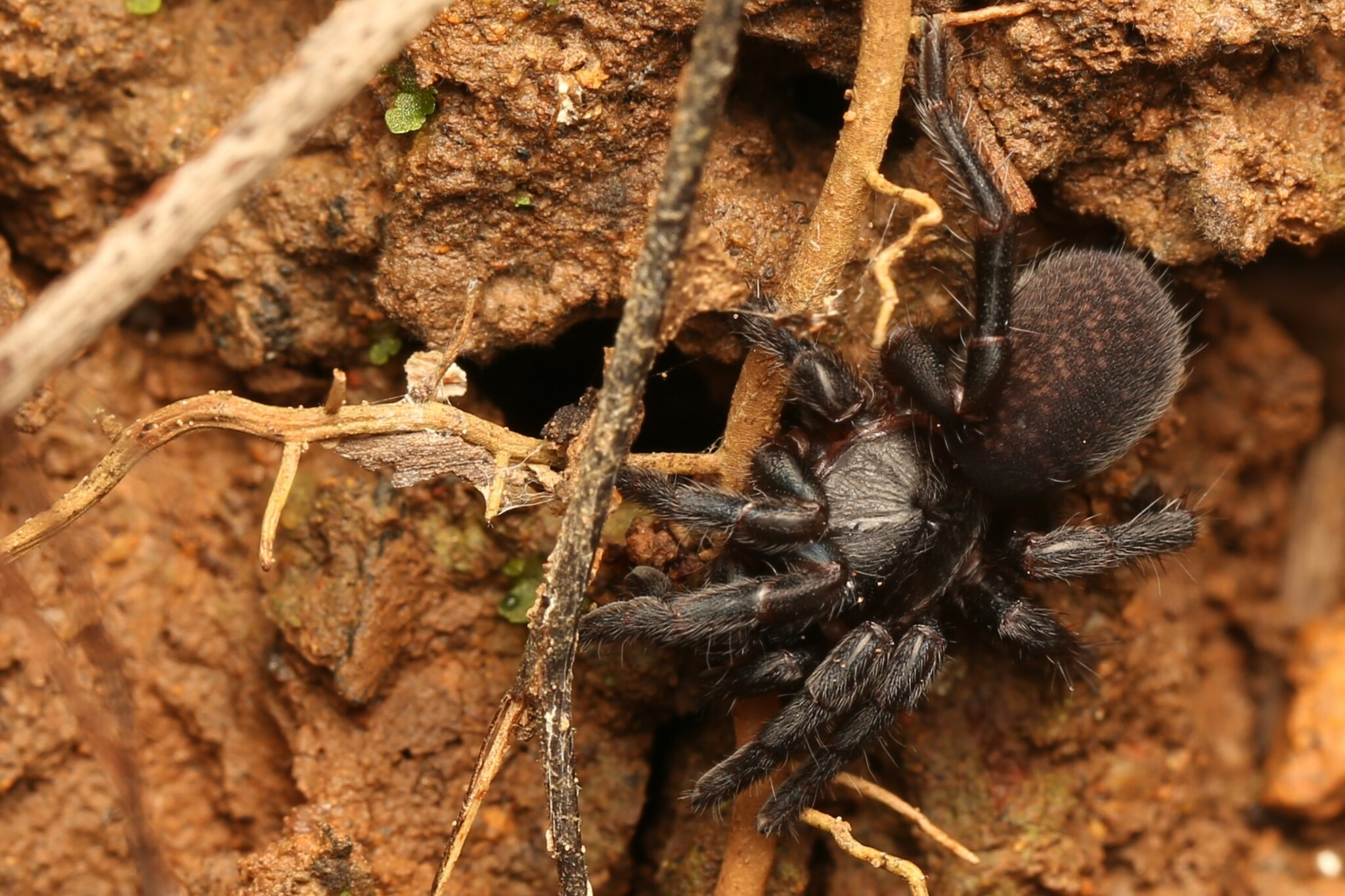
- S. hamlynharrisi
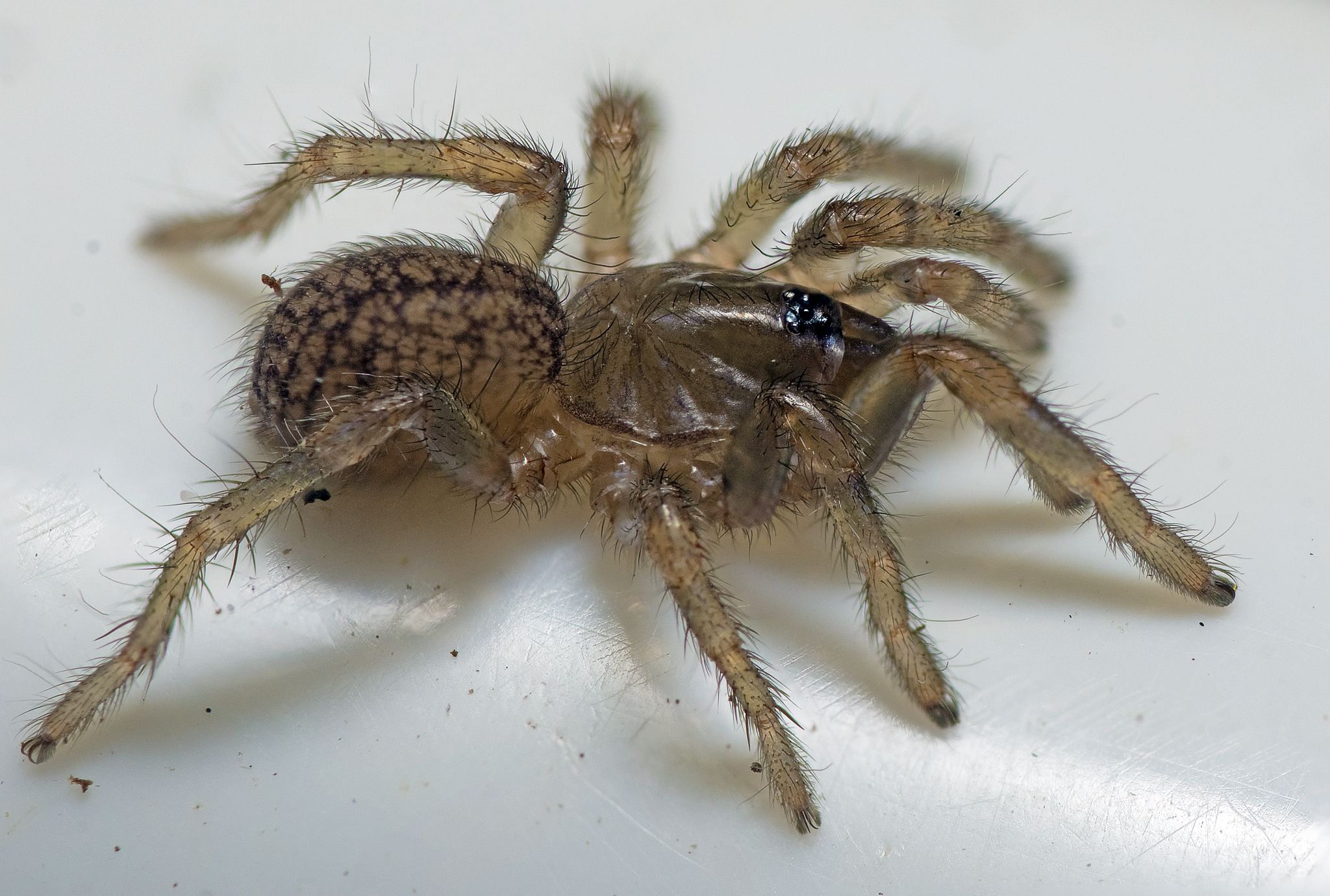
- S. jakara

Scientific classification
- Kingdom: Animalia
- Phylum: Arthropoda
- Subphylum: Chelicerata
- Class: Arachnida
- Order: Araneae
- Infraorder: Mygalomorphae
- Family: Barychelidae
- Genus: Seqocrypta; Raven, 1994

Type species
- S. jakara Raven, 1994

Species
- 4, see text

= Seqocrypta =

Genus of spiders

Seqocrypta is a genus of Australian brushed trapdoor spiders first described by Robert Raven in 1994.

== Species ==
As of October 2025 the genus contained four species found in New South Wales (NSW) and Queensland (QLD):

- Seqocrypta bancrofti Raven, 1994 – NSW
- Seqocrypta hamlynharrisi Raven & Churchill, 1994 – QLD
- Seqocrypta jakara Raven, 1994 (type) – NSW, QLD
- Seqocrypta mckeowni Raven, 1994 – NSW
