= Idioctis yerlata =

Scientific classification
- Kingdom: Animalia
- Phylum: Arthropoda
- Subphylum: Chelicerata
- Class: Arachnida
- Order: Araneae
- Infraorder: Mygalomorphae
- Family: Barychelidae
- Genus: Idioctis
- Species: I. yerlata

Binomial name
- Idioctis yerlata Churchill & Raven, 1992

Species of spider

Idioctis yerlata, also known as the intertidal trapdoor spider, is a species of mygalomorph spider in the Barychelidae family. It is endemic to Australia. It was described in 1992 by Australian arachnologists Tracey Churchill and Robert Raven. The specific epithet yerlata is an Aboriginal term for ‘oyster’, for the perceived similarity to the door of the spider's burrow.

== Distribution and habitat ==
The species occurs in coastal eastern Queensland, in intertidal habitat, in mangroves and coral rubble, along suitable beaches from Far North Queensland to Rockhampton. The type locality is Cape Tribulation.

== Behaviour ==
The spiders construct burrows in mangroves and rock cavities, with entrance doors that are closed when submerged at high tide.
