= Idioctis =

Scientific classification
- Kingdom: Animalia
- Phylum: Arthropoda
- Subphylum: Chelicerata
- Class: Arachnida
- Order: Araneae
- Infraorder: Mygalomorphae
- Family: Barychelidae
- Genus: Idioctis; L. Koch, 1874

Type species
- I. helva L. Koch, 1874

Species
- 9, see text

Synonyms
- Atrophonysia Benoit & Legendre, 1968

Genus of spiders

Idioctis is a genus of brushed trapdoor spiders that was first described by L. Koch in 1874.

== Species ==
As of November 2026, it contains 11 species:

- Idioctis eniwetok Raven, 1988 – Marshall Is., Caroline Is.
- Idioctis ferrophila Churchill & Raven, 1992 – New Caledonia
- Idioctis helva L. Koch, 1874 (type) – Fiji
- Idioctis intertidalis (Benoit & Legendre, 1968) – Madagascar, Seychelles, Mayotte
- Idioctis littoralis Abraham, 1924 – Singapore
- Idioctis marevallum Sherwood et al. 2026 – Mauritius
- Idioctis marovo Churchill & Raven, 1992 – Solomon Is.
- Idioctis parilarilao Yu, Lo, Cheng, Raven & Kuntner, 2023 - Taiwan
- Idioctis talofa Churchill & Raven, 1992 – Samoa
- Idioctis xmas Raven, 1988 – Australia (Christmas Is.)
- Idioctis yerlata Churchill & Raven, 1992 – Australia (Queensland)
