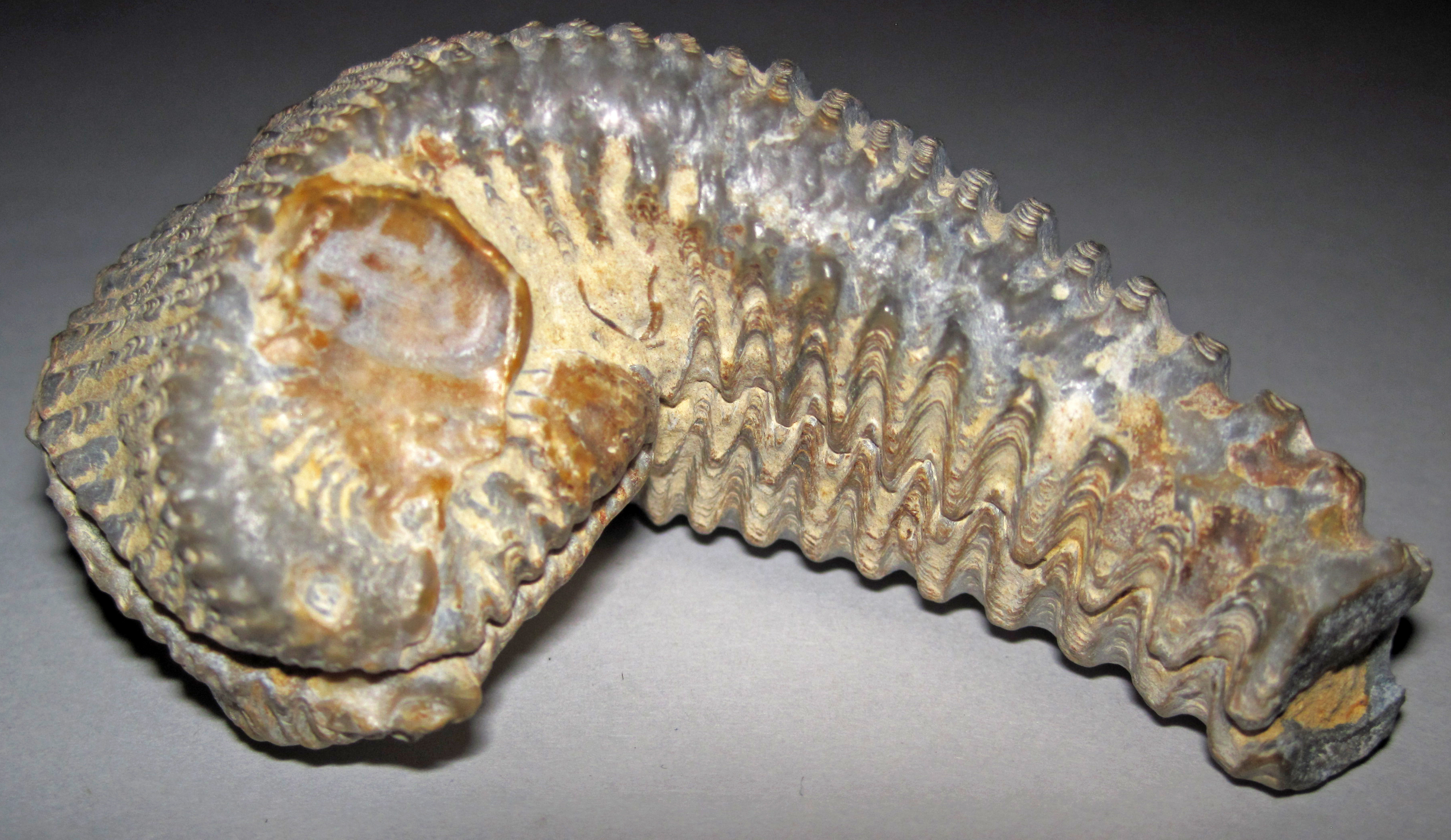
- Fossil shell of Rastellum carinatum from Upper Cretaceous, Marovoay, Madagascar

Scientific classification
- Domain: Eukaryota
- Kingdom: Animalia
- Phylum: Mollusca
- Class: Bivalvia
- Order: Ostreida
- Family: †Arctostreidae
- Genus: †Rastellum; Faujas de Saint Fond, 1799

Type species
- †Rastellum macropterum (J. De C. Sowerby, 1824)

Species
- †Rastellum diluvianum (Linnaeus, 1767); †Rastellum macropterum (J. De C. Sowerby, 1824)

Synonyms
- †Arctostrea Pervinquière, 1910 junior subjective synonym

= Rastellum =

Rastellum Temporal range: Middle Jurassic–Late Cretaceous

Extinct genus of molluscs

Rastellum is a genus of extinct molluscs, which lived from the Middle Jurassic to the Late Cretaceous.

== Subtaxa ==
Species within this genus include:

- †Rastellum allobrogensis Pictet and Roux 1853
- †Rastellum deshayesi d'Orbigny 1853
- †Rastellum diluvianum Linnaeus 1767
- †Rastellum ricordeana d'Orbigny 1850

== Fossil record ==
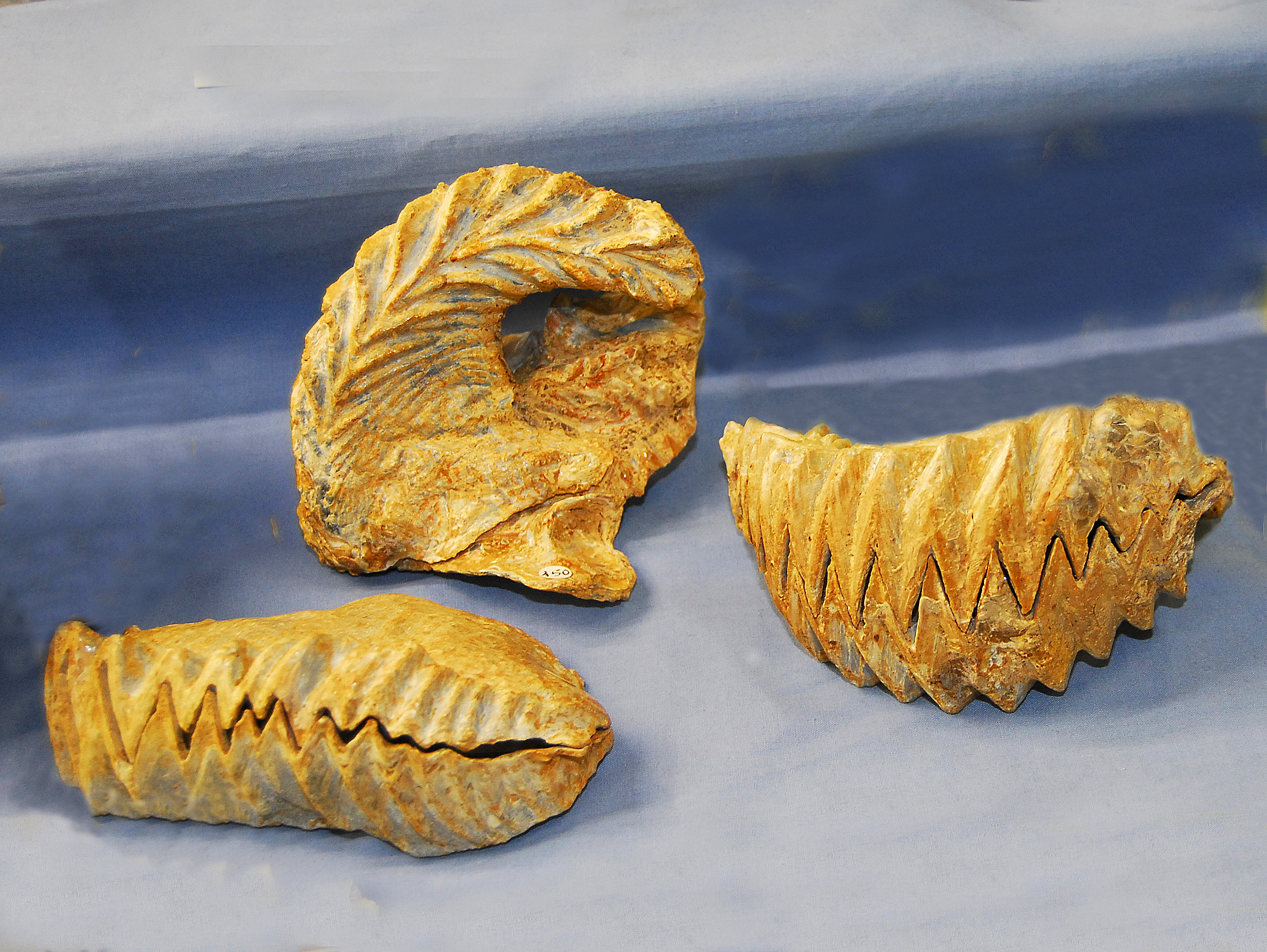
Fossil shell of Rastellum carinatum from Jurassic of Tulear, Madagascar

Fossils of Rastellum are found from the Middle Jurassic until the Late Cretaceous (age range: from 161.2 to 66.043 million years ago.). They are present in the Cretaceous marine strata throughout the world, including Afghanistan, Algeria, Argentina, Belgium, Brazil, Bulgaria, Cuba, the Czech Republic, Egypt, France, Gabon, Germany, India, Iran, Italy, Japan, Kazakhstan, Libya, Madagascar, Mozambique, the Netherlands, Pakistan, Peru, Russia, Spain, Sweden, Tunisia, Turkey, Turkmenistan, Ukraine, the United Kingdom and United States. They can also be found in the Jurassic marine strata of India, Japan, Mexico and Poland.

== Description ==
The shells of molluscs of Rastellum species can reach a length of about 10 cm (3.9 in). These oysters had a narrow-valved, tubular shell, which was composed of regularly alternating sharp ridges and deep folds. The vulnerable commissure (along which the valves meet) was sunk.

== Lifestyle ==
This genus inhabited warm waters, where it cemented itself with the pointed vertebrae to shells or corals. Oysters belonging to the genus Rastellum were stationary epifaunal suspension feeders.
