= Juncal (disambiguation) =

Juncal may refer to:

== People ==
=== Given name ===
- Juncal Rivero (born 1966), Spanish model and actress

=== Surname ===
- María Juncal, Spanish flamenco dancer

== Geography ==
- Cape Juncal, prominent cape forming the northwestern extremity of D'Urville Island, in the Joinville Island group, Antarctica
- Juncal, civil parish in the municipality of Porto de Mós, Portugal
- Juncal Formation, sedimentary geologic unit in California, U.S.
- Juncal Island, island belonging to Uruguay
- Juncal River, river of Chile
- Juncal, San Sebastián, Puerto Rico, barrio
- Laguna El Juncal, body of water located near the city of Viedma, Argentina
- Nevado Juncal, mountain at the border of Argentina and Chile
- Río Juncal, river of San Sebastián and Lares, Puerto Rico

== Other ==
- Acanthogonatus juncal, mygalomorph spider of Argentina and Chile
- Battle of Juncal, naval battle
- Count of Juncal, Portuguese title of nobility
