= Acanthogonatus confusus =

Scientific classification
- Kingdom: Animalia
- Phylum: Arthropoda
- Subphylum: Chelicerata
- Class: Arachnida
- Order: Araneae
- Infraorder: Mygalomorphae
- Family: Pycnothelidae
- Genus: Acanthogonatus
- Species: A. confusus

Binomial name
- Acanthogonatus confusus Goloboff, 1995

Species of spider

Acanthogonatus confusus is a mygalomorph spider of Argentina and Chile, its name referring to the confusion between this species and A. subcalpeianus. Males are recognized by their long palpi, together with the absence of a tibial apophysis; females are recognized by the spermathecae (similar to A. fuegianus, A. centralis and A. parana, which have - unlike A. Confusus - no inferior tarsal claws on tarsus IV).

== Description ==
- Female: total length 24.6 millimetres (0.97 in); cephalothorax length 10.35 millimetres (0.407 in), width 8.45 millimetres (0.333 in); cephalic region length 6.35 millimetres (0.250 in), width 6 millimetres (0.24 in); fovea width 0.9 millimetres (0.035 in); labium length 1.12 millimetres (0.044 in), width 1.62 millimetres (0.064 in); sternum length 5.8 millimetres (0.23 in), width 4.4 millimetres (0.17 in). Its cephalic region is low and flat; its fovea is sinuous, procurved and without a posterior notch. Its labium possesses 3 cuspules. A serrula is present and well developed, occupying an extended area on the anterior lobe. Its posterior sternal sigilla is two times longer than wide and its sternum is rebordered. Chelicerae: rastellum absent; book lung openings appear wider than other species of the genus, with their posterior rim more sclerotized. Their colour resembles the males.
- Male: total length 23.6 millimetres (0.93 in); cephalothorax length 8.8 millimetres (0.35 in), width 7.35 millimetres (0.289 in); cephalic region length 5.3 millimetres (0.21 in), width 4.2 millimetres (0.17 in); labium length 0.75 millimetres (0.030 in), width 1.25 millimetres (0.049 in); sternum length 4.55 millimetres (0.179 in), width 3.57 millimetres (0.141 in). Its labium has 1 cuspule. A serrula is present and well developed. Its sternal sigilla is shallow and small, while its sternum is rebordered. Chelicerae: rastellum absent. Cheliceral tumescence is present: small, acetose and ventrally protruding. Its metatarsus are gently curved (almost straight). Cephalothorax, legs and palpi are reddish brown; abdomen yellowish in colour with brown chevron.

== Distribution ==
Forests in southern Chile (Regions VIII-X) and adjacent Neuquen Province (Argentina).

== Taxonomy and behaviour ==
Goloboff (1995) states there may be more than one species included in his description study. A lack of specimens in his initial observations made it difficult to statistically describe Argentinian specimens, which had smaller and more convoluted spermathecal ducts, and thus different species were not distinguished.

The specimens from Pinares (Concepción, Chile) from that same article, have a shorter outer spermathecal lobe than other specimens, probably being juveniles.

Adults were found under stones and logs, where they construct a silk tube and a shallow burrow. At Contulmo and Pata de Gallina juveniles were collected in moss or loose soil.
