= Acanthogonatus hualpen =

Scientific classification
- Kingdom: Animalia
- Phylum: Arthropoda
- Subphylum: Chelicerata
- Class: Arachnida
- Order: Araneae
- Infraorder: Mygalomorphae
- Family: Pycnothelidae
- Genus: Acanthogonatus
- Species: A. hualpen

Binomial name
- Acanthogonatus hualpen Goloboff, 1995

Species of spider

Acanthogonatus hualpen is a mygalomorph spider of Chile, named after its type locality: Hualpén, Concepción, Bío Bío Region. Males can be distinguished from those of A. nahuelbuta and A. patagallina by the shaped of the bulb's apex, and by the palpal tibia being wide in the basal two-thirds (tapering abruptly at the apex) with thickened setae along the apical one-third of the retrolateral face (instead of two-thirds).

== Description ==
- Male: total length 9.42 millimetres (0.371 in); cephalothorax length 4.08 millimetres (0.161 in), width 3.25 millimetres (0.128 in); cephalic region length 2.66 millimetres (0.105 in), width 1.92 millimetres (0.076 in); medial ocular quadrangle (OQ) length 0.45 millimetres (0.018 in), width 0.84 millimetres (0.033 in); labium length 0.34 millimetres (0.013 in), width 0.79 millimetres (0.031 in); sternum length 1.2 millimetres (0.047 in), width 0.99 millimetres (0.039 in). Its labium and maxillae possess no cuspules; its maxillae have thickened setae on their anterior inner corner. A serrula is present. Its sternum and sigilla resemble those in A. nahuelbuta. Chelicerae: rastellum is absent. Cheliceral tumescence is small, with a ventral protuberance. Leg I and its tibial apophysis is similar to that of A. Nahuelbuta, while its metatarsus is straight. Its color is also as in A. Nahuelbuta.
- Female: total length 12.5 millimetres (0.49 in); cephalothorax length 4.90 millimetres (0.193 in), width 3.92 millimetres (0.154 in); cephalic region length 3.32 millimetres (0.131 in), width 2.6 millimetres (0.10 in); fovea width 0.62 millimetres (0.024 in); OQ length 0.49 millimetres (0.019 in), width 0.95 millimetres (0.037 in); labium length 0.47 millimetres (0.019 in), width 0.85 millimetres (0.033 in);sternum length 2.52 millimetres (0.099 in), width 2.27 millimetres (0.089 in). Its cephalic region is convex, with the fovea slightly procurved. Its labium possesses 1 cuspule. A well-developed serrula is present. Its sternal sigilla is small, shallow and marginal. Chelicerae: rastellum is absent. Color as in male.

== Distribution ==
Only in its type locality.
