= Acanthogonatus peniasco =

Scientific classification
- Kingdom: Animalia
- Phylum: Arthropoda
- Subphylum: Chelicerata
- Class: Arachnida
- Order: Araneae
- Infraorder: Mygalomorphae
- Family: Pycnothelidae
- Genus: Acanthogonatus
- Species: A. peniasco

Binomial name
- Acanthogonatus peniasco Goloboff, 1995

Species of spider

Acanthogonatus peniasco is a mygalomorph spider of Chile, its name arising from its type locality: El Peñasco, Linares, VII Region (del Maule), Chile. Females differ from those of A. franki and A. recinto in the shorter, wider, and more sclerotized spermathecal ducts, and from those of other species in the genus by having 1-1-1 P spines in the patella IV.

== Description ==
- Female: total length 15.27 millimetres (0.601 in); cephalothorax length 6.56 millimetres (0.258 in); cephalic region length 4.21 millimetres (0.166 in), width 3.65 millimetres (0.144 in); fovea width 0.55 millimetres (0.022 in); medial ocular quadrangle 0.57 millimetres (0.022 in), width 1.2 millimetres (0.047 in); labium length 0.54 millimetres (0.021 in), width 1.25 millimetres (0.049 in); sternum length 3.49 millimetres (0.137 in), width 2.78 millimetres (0.109 in). Its cephalic region is moderately convex, with a deep fovea with a posterior notch. Its labium possesses 2 cuspules. A serrula is present. Its posterior sternal sigilla is oval and submarginal, with its sternum being rebordered. Chelicerae: rastellum is formed by long, thin setae. Its cephalothorax, legs and palpi are a reddish-brown colour, while its abdomen is a light yellowish brown, with dorsal mottles present.

== Distribution ==
It is known to habitate in borrows only from the type locality. These have an open entrance, lined with little silk, in banks and hill slopes in an open forest.

It sometimes co-habitates the same area as Calathotarsus and Scotinoecus species.
