= Acanthogonatus juncal =

Scientific classification
- Kingdom: Animalia
- Phylum: Arthropoda
- Subphylum: Chelicerata
- Class: Arachnida
- Order: Araneae
- Infraorder: Mygalomorphae
- Family: Pycnothelidae
- Genus: Acanthogonatus
- Species: A. juncal

Binomial name
- Acanthogonatus juncal Goloboff, 1995

Species of spider

Acanthogonatus juncal is a mygalomorph spider of Argentina and Chile, named after its type locality: Juncal, Los.

Andes. A. juncal is the smallest two-clawed Acanthogonatus (most similar species: A. huaquen and A. quilocura, have a cephalothorax length of over 8 millimetres (0.31 in), compared to less than 4 millimetres (0.16 in) in A. juncal.

== Description ==
- Female: total length 9.47 millimetres (0.373 in); cephalothorax length 3.77 millimetres (0.148 in), width 3.09 millimetres (0.122 in); cephalic region length 2.44 millimetres (0.096 in), width 1.98 millimetres (0.078 in); fovea width 0.45 millimetres (0.018 in); medial ocular quadrangle length 0.42 millimetres (0.017 in), width 0.76 millimetres (0.030 in); labium length 0.32 millimetres (0.013 in), width 0.84 millimetres (0.033 in): sternum length 2.01 millimetres (0.079 in), width 1.74 millimetres (0.069 in). Its cephalic region is slightly convex, with a recurved fovea with a posterior median notch. Its labium possesses no cuspules. A serrula is present. Its sternal sigilla is small and oval; its sternum rebordered weakly. Chelicerae: rastellum is absent. Its cephalothorax, legs and palpi are a uniform yellowish brown colour; its venter is more pallid, while its dorsal abdomen is mottled.

== Distribution ==
Juncal, Los Andes, Chile, a dry shrubland. Specimens were collected from small burrows at stone edges.
