= General Fernández Oro railway station =

Railway station in General Fernández Oro, Argentina

General Fernández Oro
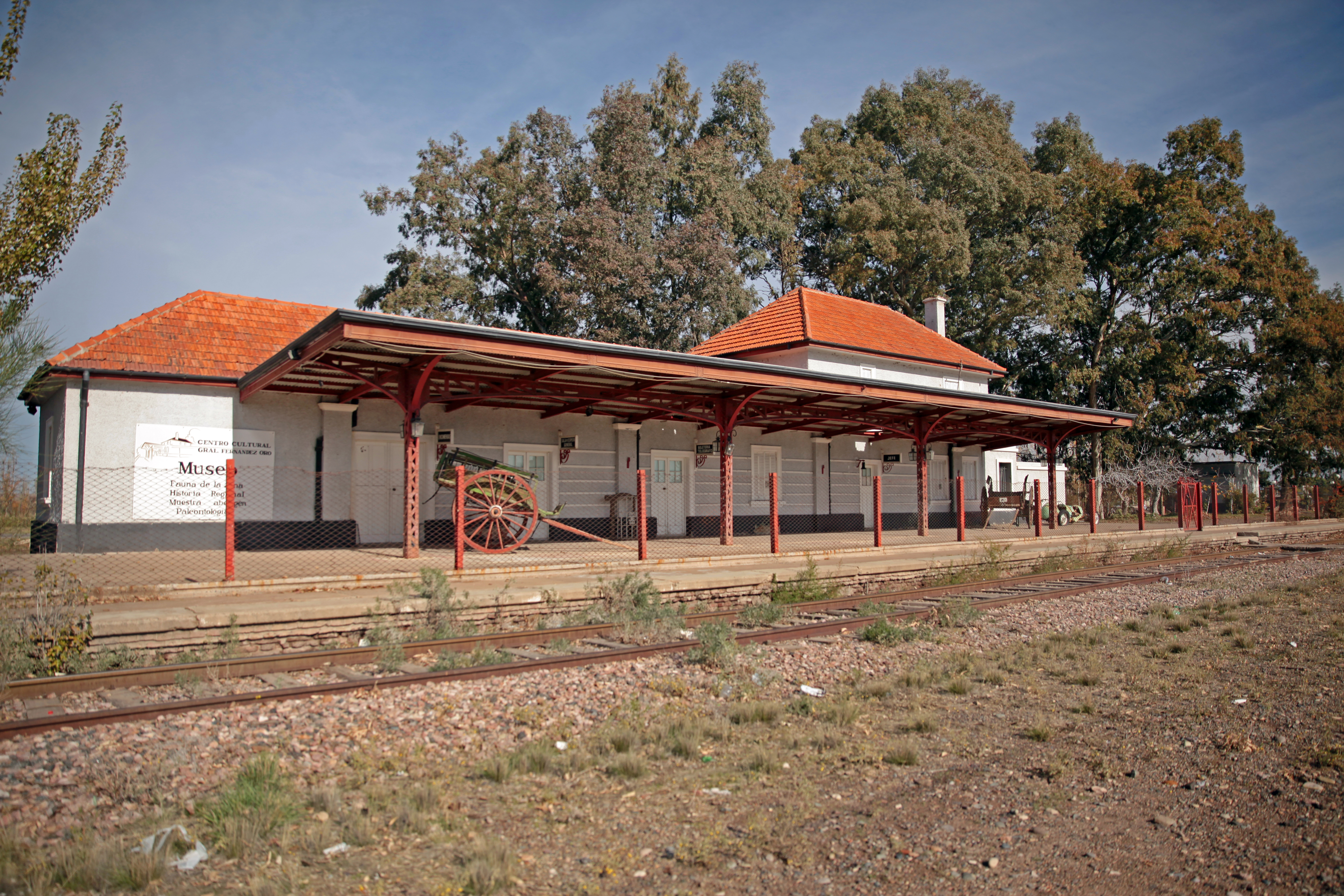
- Station building and platform, 2014

General information
- Location: Provincial Route 65, km 1,181; General Fernández Oro, Río Negro; Argentina
- Owner: Government of Argentina
- Operator: Ferrocarriles Argentinos (1948–1993)
- Platforms: 1
- Tracks: 1

History
- Opened: August 1, 1899
- Closed: 1993; 33 years ago
Location

The General Fernández Oro railway station is a former train station located in the homonymous city in the General Roca Department, Río Negro Province, Argentina. It opened on August 1, 1899 as "Km. 1,181", and was renamed after General Manuel Fernández Oro (1848–1910), who took part in the Conquest of the Desert. It features the typical architectural design of stations built by Ferrocarriles del Sud at the end of the 19th century.

The station is located on Provincial Route 65, 1,181 km at General Fernández Oro city, one of the cities in the Alto Valle valley (along the Río Negro). Towards the east, the next station is Allen; towards the west, the next station is Cipolletti. General Fernández Oro is part of the Bahía Blanca-Zapala line of General Roca Railway. Since 1993, the line has carried only freight services, and is currently operated by the private company Ferrosur Roca.

== History ==
In Argentina, many towns were founded around railway stations. General Fernández Oro railway station was part of a strategic project to build a railroad to transport military personnel towards the Andes area, in view of the possibility of a military conflict with Chile.

After the station was opened, the first settlers (mainly immigrants) arrived. By 1927, a small town surrounded the station.

After former President Perón nationalized all railways in Argentina in 1948, the railway line was renamed General Roca.

The station is nowadays the Estación Cultural Lucinda Larrosa Museum, an exhibition center first conceived as a museum of natural sciences and regional history that nowadays holds periodical artistic exhibitions. Freight transport company Ferrosur Roca runs services on the line, but the station remains inactive for rail transport.

=== Operators ===
| Company | Period |
|---|---|
| (United Kingdom) Buenos Aires Great Southern Railway | 1901–1948 |
| (Argentina) Ferrocarriles Argentinos | 1948–1993 |

== Gallery ==
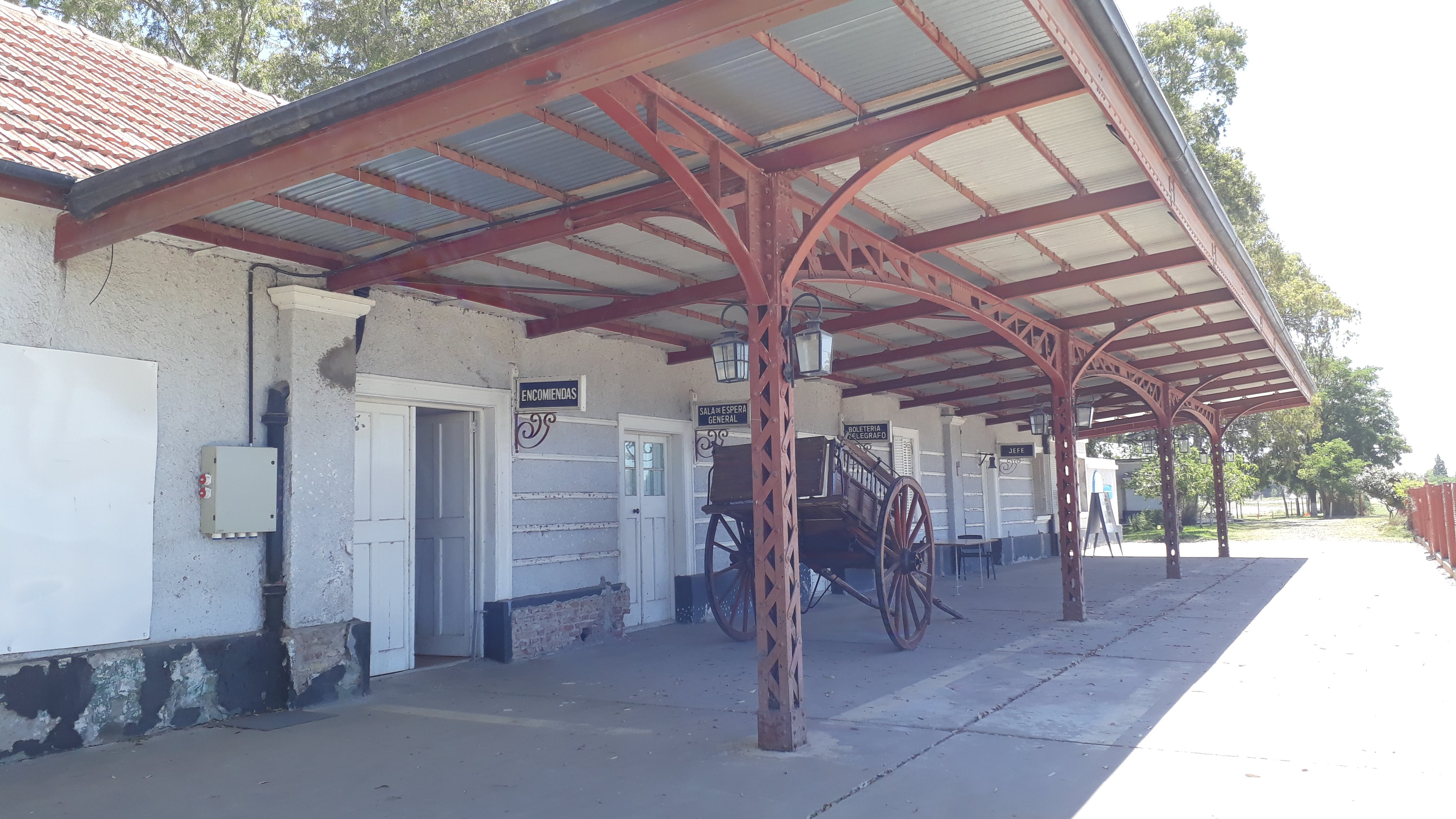
Platform

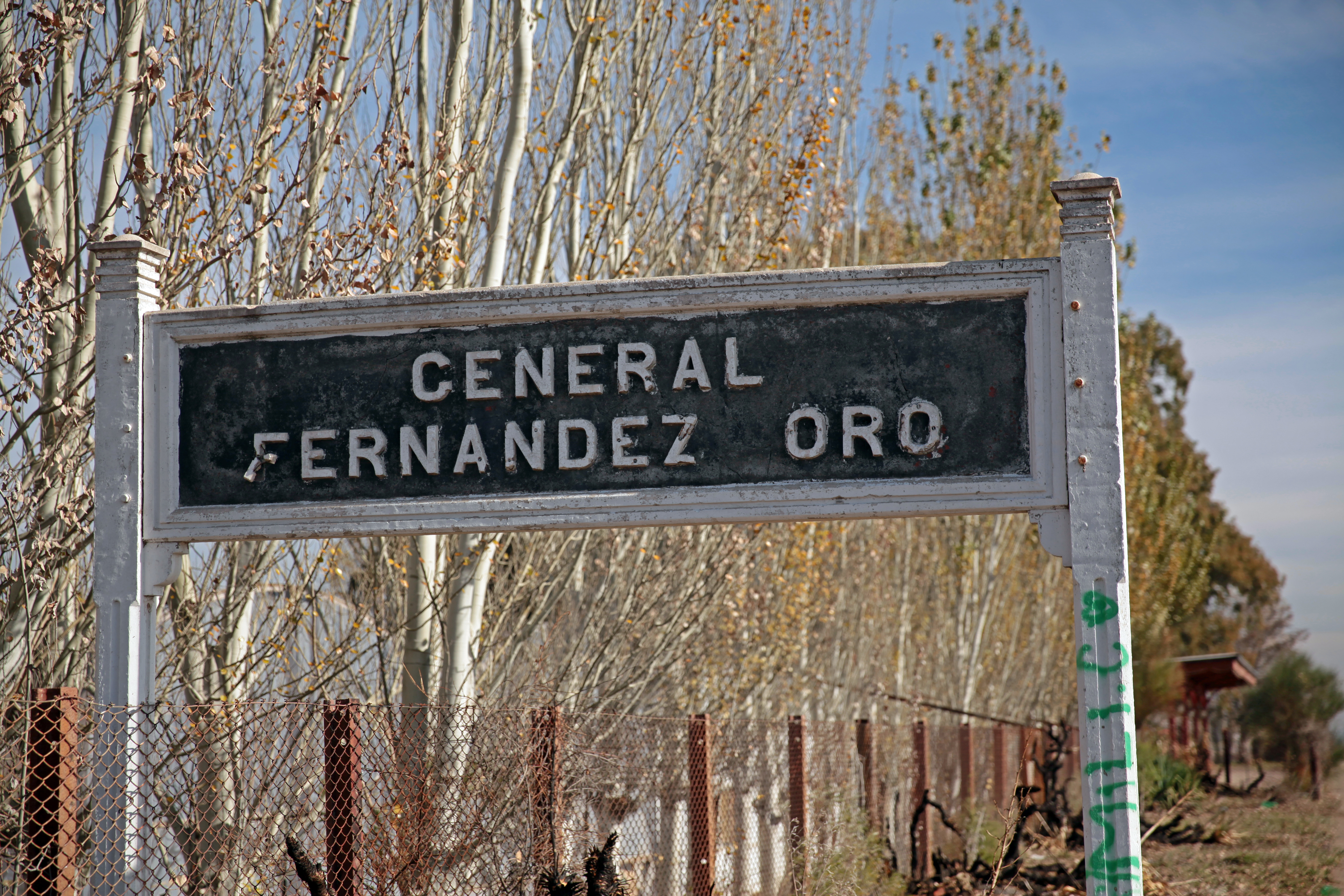
Station sign

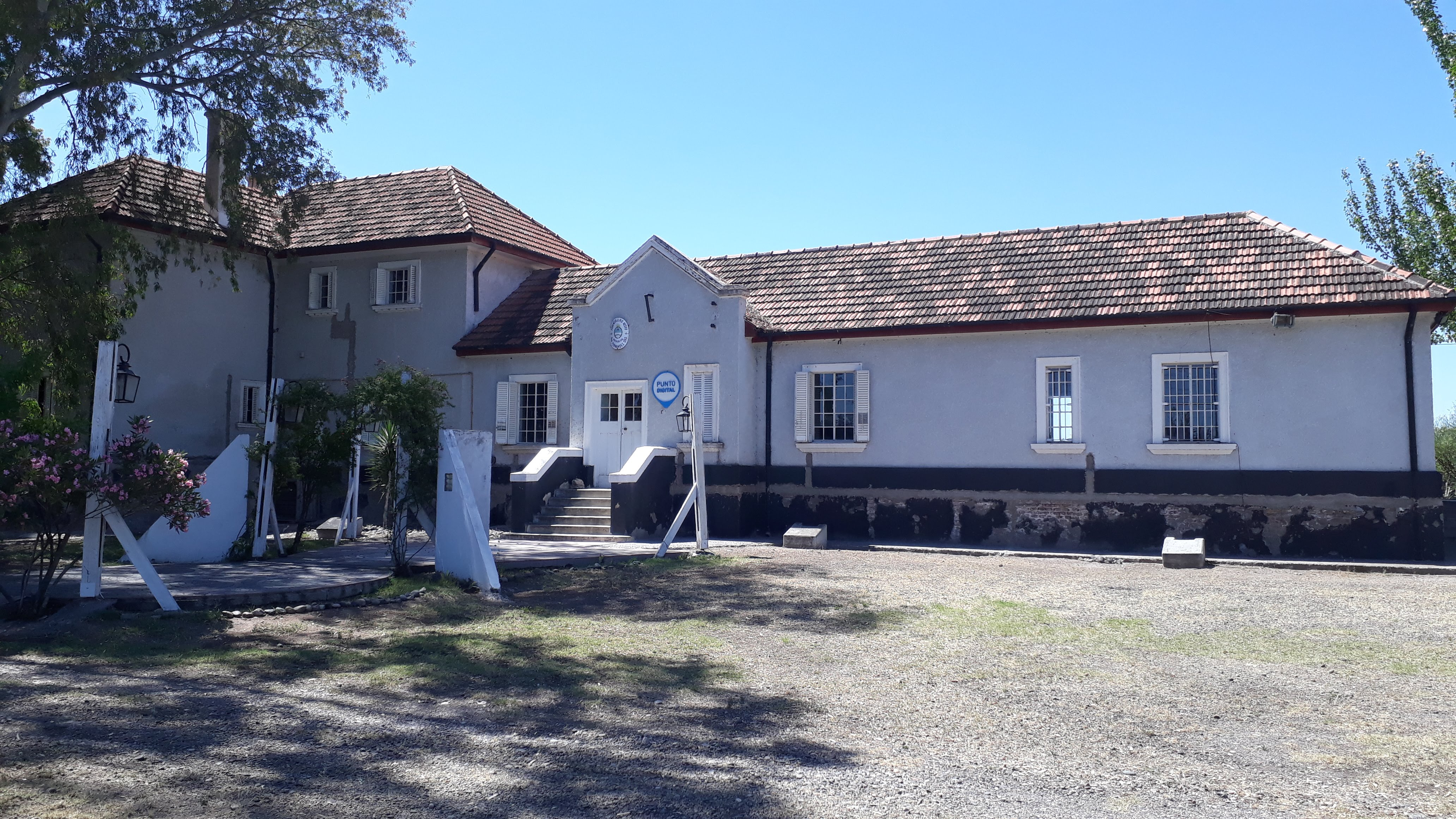
Front view

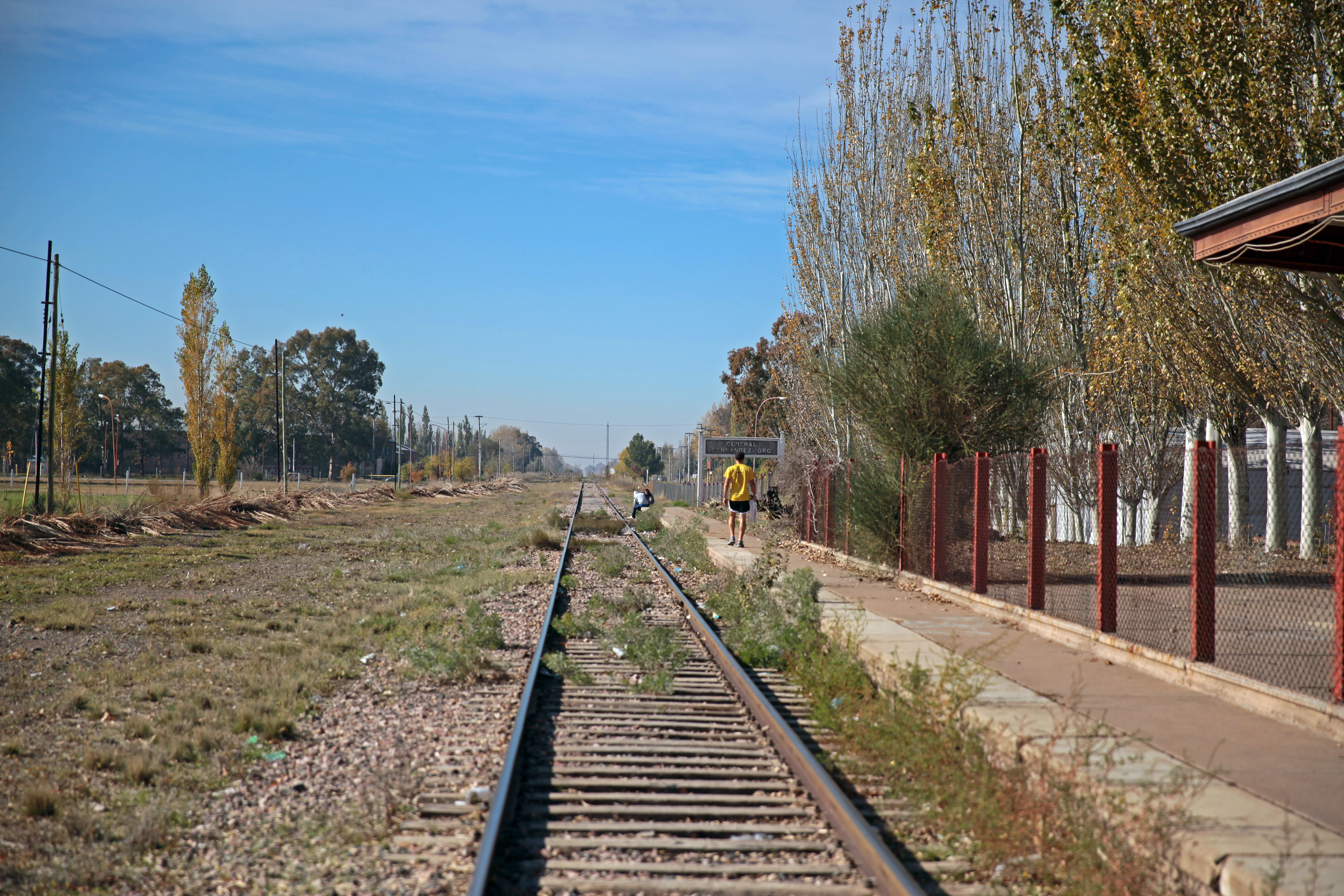
Tracks

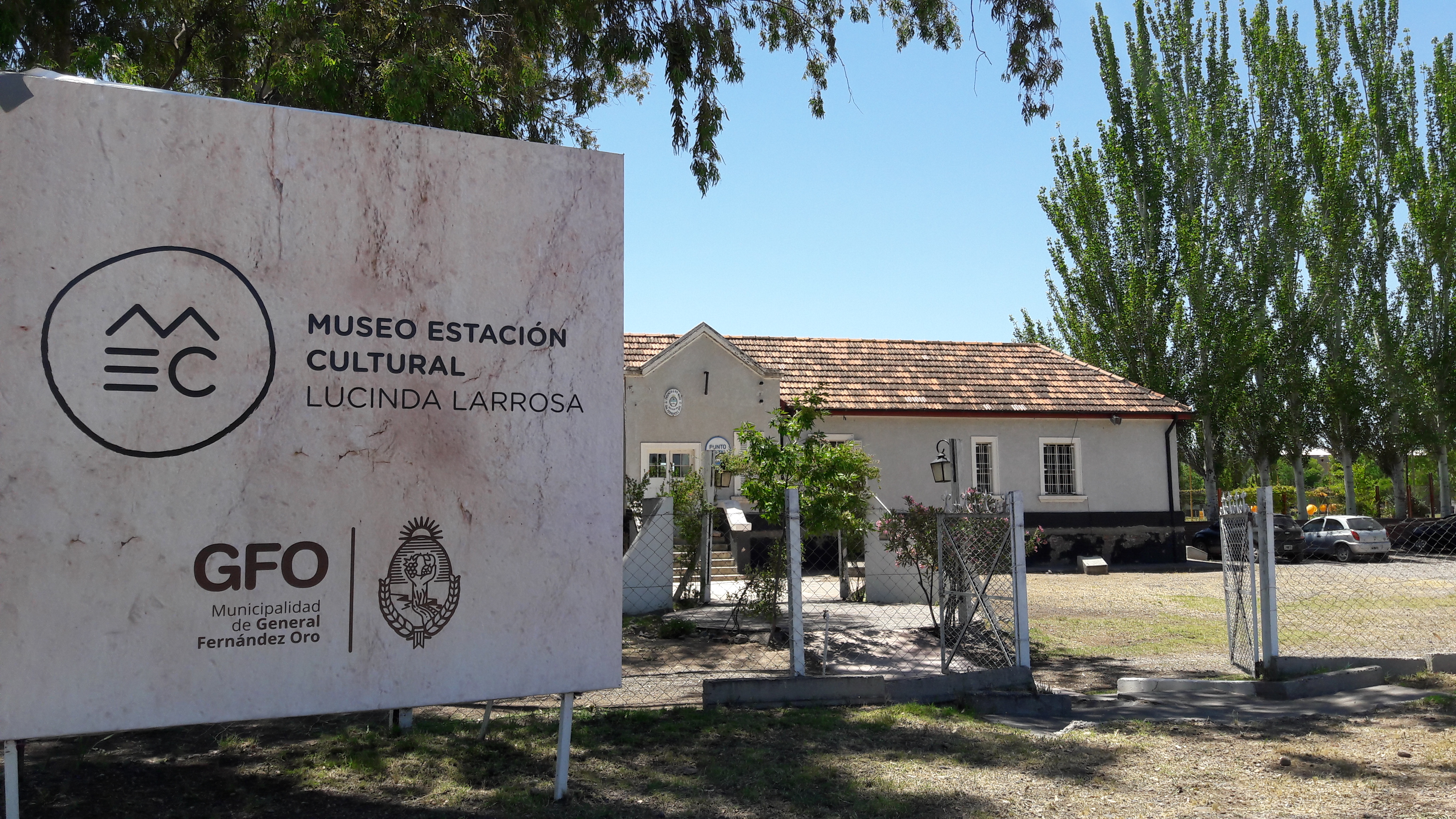
Lucinda Larrosa Museum sign

== See also ==
- Estación Cultural Lucinda Larrosa Museum
- General Fernández Oro
