= Estación Cultural Lucinda Larrosa Museum =

Museum in Río Negro Province, Argentina

- Museo Estación Cultural Lucinda Larrosa
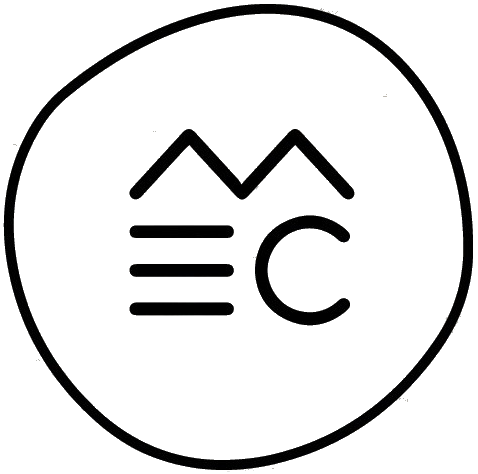

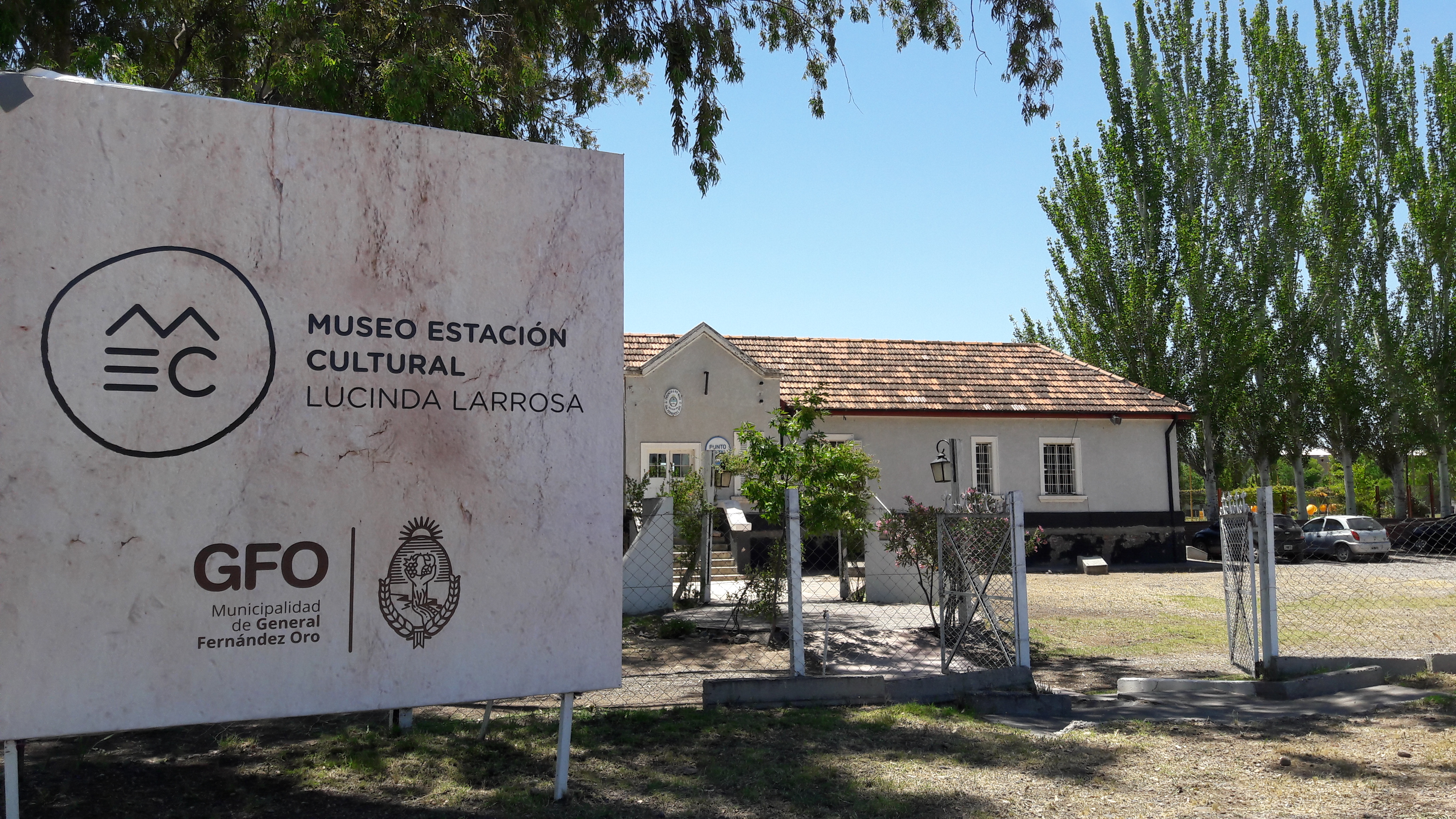
- Museum façade and sign as seen in 2018
- Established: 1999; 27 years ago
- Location: General Fernández Oro, Río Negro Province, Argentina
- Coordinates: 38.9572°S 67.9216°W
- Type: Art museum Cultural center archaeological museum

The Estación Cultural Lucinda Larrosa Museum (abbrevriated MEC) is a museum and cultural center first conceived as an archaeological and regional historic museum that nowadays holds periodical artistic exhibitions. It is located in the city of General Fernández Oro, Río Negro Province, kilometer 1181, on the side of provincial route 65. The museum was named after General Fernández Oro's wife, Lucinda González Larrosa, who died in Buenos Aires in 1910.

== Origins and new proposal ==
The first museum followed the guidelines of local history museums. It was established as a museum of natural sciences and local history. It was named in honor of General Fernández Oro's wife, Mrs. Lucinda González Larrosa, who died in Buenos Aires in 1910.

The museum bears the name "Estación" because the facility used to be a railway station that was active from the beginning of the 20th century up to the 70s. In 1999, the building was opened to the public as a museum through an initiative carried out by a group of local residents. It remained closed to the public for several years, until it was reopened in 2016, when it underwent a complete change in its historical, cultural, social and aesthetical perspective. In this sense, the MEC posits a new meaning to what was once Mrs. Lucinda's Museum. It strives to be a cultural space that drives debate and reflection for the community and the region, and it offers monthly activities that encourage its visitors to engage in active participation and reflection.

In this renewal process that started in 2015, the aim is to revise the history of the museum itself and its location under the hermeneutics of the present time, and the local present disrupted by the demographic impact. The contributing factors to these changes are fruit crisis and hydrocarbon exploitation.

As Castilla points out, "Most 20th-century museums were characterized by giving unidirectional information and an institutional voice that could not be dissented, while new prototypes allow multiple voices and interpretations. The main focus was to exhibit objects, and the public was barely taken into account. However, nowadays engagement and experience of the public are fundamental."

The MEC is viewed as a unit, a cohesive whole. Every space is directly related to its adjacent space, and the museographic script is still part of the museum itself. Therefore, it aims to deconstruct the traditional, hegemonic and canonical discourses that are linked to the official story of the "Conquest of the Desert", generally supported by the museums of Alto Valle of río Negro. This process constitutes an axis organizing collections and ways to exhibit them. This new museological proposal means new practices, which encourages alternative points of view and includes diverse perceptions of nature and culture that exist in the community of Alto Valle. In this new perspective, the different exhibits at the MEC are shown to create aesthetical experiences, and promote a collaborative and relational practice. Therefore, visitors become active and they are encouraged to participate in the exhibits and to construct them. Furthermore, such exhibits are designed, taking the context of production and reception into account, and collaborating constantly with the target community. The aim is to strengthen the component parts of identity and identities of the city.

These new cultural dynamics are also affected by the change in artistic interests in the last decades. Artists stop doing their main activities to examine contexts, deconstruct discourses, making the invisible visible. They often work as geographers, anthropologists, and documentalists. In this expansion of the artistic fact in which many artists opt to use reality as raw material, the museum interestingly becomes a working place for artists who seek to dismantle narratives and/or work on those aspects that official history has made invisible.

Therefore, artistic projects and strategies are incorporated into a non-art museum, which are a means to activate and make multiple voices dynamic, refuting the unidirectional historical story, and opening up new possibilities of interaction.

== Tours ==
=== Dismantling ===
The spatial layout begins in the entrance hall with Dismantling, artistic work with a specific area, composed by the team URS with the help of curator Carmen Di Prinzio, exhibited for the first time in August 2016. The intervention process of this work with a specific area consisted in dismantling the photographic reproductions of General Archive of the Nation that referred to the Conquest of the Desert. A mark is left on the wall that through time remains there, and the rest is painted in white, thus reinforcing the footprint and that space. Furthermore, legends in the photographs were kept, showing the dynamics of presence and absence.

Dismantling aims to destabilize visual discourse on the politics of land seizure and exploitation shown in the pictures that were taken by photographers during the expedition, as well as the order in which they are exhibited, and their legends. Dismantling a discourse becomes a "poetic and political operation". Therefore, it provides a new forum for discussion and debate beyond hegemonic narratives.

It is a space that is conceived when it is dynamized with the different stories as new artistic proposals are being put forward. The Desert without its Conquerors is another intervention with a specific area carried out in this same room by the artists Mariana Lombard and Mariana Corral. Such intervention consists of a reproduction of a landscape that was used by the painter Juan Manuel Blanes to portray the military staff's expedition to río Negro. These artists reproduce this historical painting, lacquered on glass, without the military presence, restoring the landscape to its previous state of the territorial domain. This work shown in this space replaced the engraving that reproduced the original painting by Blanes, today off the wall. Thus the footprint and temporal overlapping are used as a "poetic device" to shape a new museographic definition of space.

Instructions to Erase a Line is another work composed by the team URS, exhibited in Geopoetics. It consists of a guide of eight steps for the theft of a boundary marker between Chile and Argentina with the aim to exhibit it. The boundary marker along with the instructions is located in the entrance hall. It reinforces the idea of a dominating government that set territorial limits. Through a joint effort artists seek to erase the political demarcation line and establish a zone as an ancestral crossing place.

=== Local history ===
In the space of Local History, routes are traced with a focus on the process of the founding of Alto Valle, from the acquisition of lands by generals during the Conquest of the Desert, as in the case of Manuel Fernández Oro, leading to the start of the capitalist development in the region. In the beginning a railway and irrigation system was implemented thanks to a federal government that had left its heavy footprint in these geographical regions and dominions of which people depend on. From these places the community is encouraged to evoke individual and collective memory to tell microstories from the present which gradually made up this small rural city that nowadays is going through a radical transformation. With this proposal of space of local history, it aims to make the notion of pioneers-colonists invalid, under which history museums were created in the localities of Alto Valle.

In the room the archive of oral memory, under permanent construction, and the photographic archive by Daniel Astete are available to the community. It stores photographs on the social life of the locality, taken during the 70s, 80s and 90s by Daniel, who was the only photographer in those years. Astete was born in Chile on 21 July 1941. At the age of seven, he settled down with his family in the city of Fernández Oro. There he grew up and practised his profession known by most of Oro residents. Through his eyes and recording, fragments of local memories can be reconstructed. Thanks to the donation and recovery of an important amount of negatives digitalized, this archive was made available to the community so that visitors can take his memories.

=== Science ===
The space of Science is under construction as part of the project "Arts, Science and Archives. Intersections for other Museographic Narratives", belonging to the Secretary of Research, Artistic Creation, Development and Transfer of Technology of National University of Río Negro. The project team is composed of scientists, theorists, and artists. It seeks to show the scientific practices that in the past helped to support the Conquest of the Desert, and they became hegemonic models for science museums in the region. Its general purpose is to conceive of other possible narratives on the collections and the territory from the point of view of interdisciplinary epistemology, incorporating the work of artistic creation into the museum, which is essential for the development of new poetics. Thus the museum is transformed into a field of experimental and contemporary research, creating a dynamic and accessible space, under permanent construction and update on its stories.

== Means of poetic communication ==
=== Telegraph ===
The project 546 km, carried out by the visual artist Federico Gloriani, aims to bring back the telegraph and to show how this traditional means of communication works. Therefore, it offers an experience that reactivates the connection between the museums located in two stations of the historical railroad Bahía Blanca–Neuquén–Zapala. It links Taller Ferrowhite Museum, in the port of Ingeniero White (Bahía Blanca), and Estación Cultural Lucinda Larrosa Museum (Fernández Oro), at a distance of 546 km. Both institutions are historically connected by the railroad to foster the economic exchange and growth of both localities, and nowadays by the museological way of thinking.

The physical place where the telegraph is permanently installed, former ticket booth of the station, is located in the entrance hall of the MEC. The aim is to get familiarized with the Morse code and to have a vivid experience through real communication. Thus it works as a learning device. It is a service available at the museum to be used by the community. Therefore, the museographic story fosters a new relationship with active audiences.

=== Post box ===
It is a project that aims to value and reactivate the old post box of the city, located at the San Martín and Brentana road intersection, outside the local headquarter of the postal service Correo Argentino. Its goal is to recover and redefine a traditional means of communication that is outdated. Furthermore, the project encourages local residents to use it as an alternative method of communication. Therefore, anyone who wants to participate can send material enclosed in an envelope, such as graphics, newspaper articles, letters, stories, interviews and/or photographs, either recent or old, rural or urban, that are part of the local history. The envelope must be sent to MEC-Estación de Ferrocarril km 1181, and at the back the full name and address must be included (the maximum size is 15 × 18 cm). Such revival project proposal serves as archival and exhibit material for the MEC.

=== RadioMEC ===
The aim is to produce material, and announce news on exhibits, events and activities that focus on the present, putting the past into perspective. With two editions until now, there are plans to include new methods of communication, amplifying voices that reconstruct the identities of the region through narration.

== Exhibits ==
The MEC has both permanent and temporary exhibits.

=== Permanent Exhibits ===
- Desmontaje (Dismantling).
- Local History Room.
- 546 km (August 2018).

=== Temporary Exhibits ===
- Apuntes sobre flora (Notes on Flora) (July 2016).
- Experiencia transfrontera (Cross-border Experience) (August 2016).
- Daniel Astete. El fotógrafo (Daniel Astete.The Photographer) (September 2017).
- Pueblos originarios. Dos miradas (Indigenous Peoples: Two Points of View) (October 2017).
- Hola MEC (Hello MEC) (November 2017).
- Geopoéticas (Geopoetics) (April 2018).
- Acá también pasó (The Same Happened Here), about the Day of Remembrance for Truth and Justice (24 March 2017 and 2018).
- SACO. Arqueología del presente (SACO. Archaeology of the Present) (July 2018).
- Heridas (Wounds) (September 2018).
- Inakayal vuelve (Inakayal Returns) (October 2018).
- 30 × 30 (November 2018).
- Horizontes múltiples (Multiple Horizons) (December 2018).
- Diversidad Lúdica (Playful Diversity) (March 2019).
- Acuarelas de las chacras (Watercolors of Orchards) (May 2019).
- Costumbres argentinas, la mirada sobre el Otro (Argentinian Customs, a Perspective on the Other) (September 2019).
- Sur Real – Re Existe (Real South – It really Exists) (October 2019).
- Cartología del dorado (Cartography of Gold) (December 2019).

== Collections ==
The MEC has collections about Geology, Archeology, Paleontology, History and Fauna of the city.

=== Archeology ===
The archeological collection contains lithic material and pottery, among other objects found in the region of Fernández Oro. The archaeological collection also hosts human bones from a burial excavated in Laguna El Juncal.

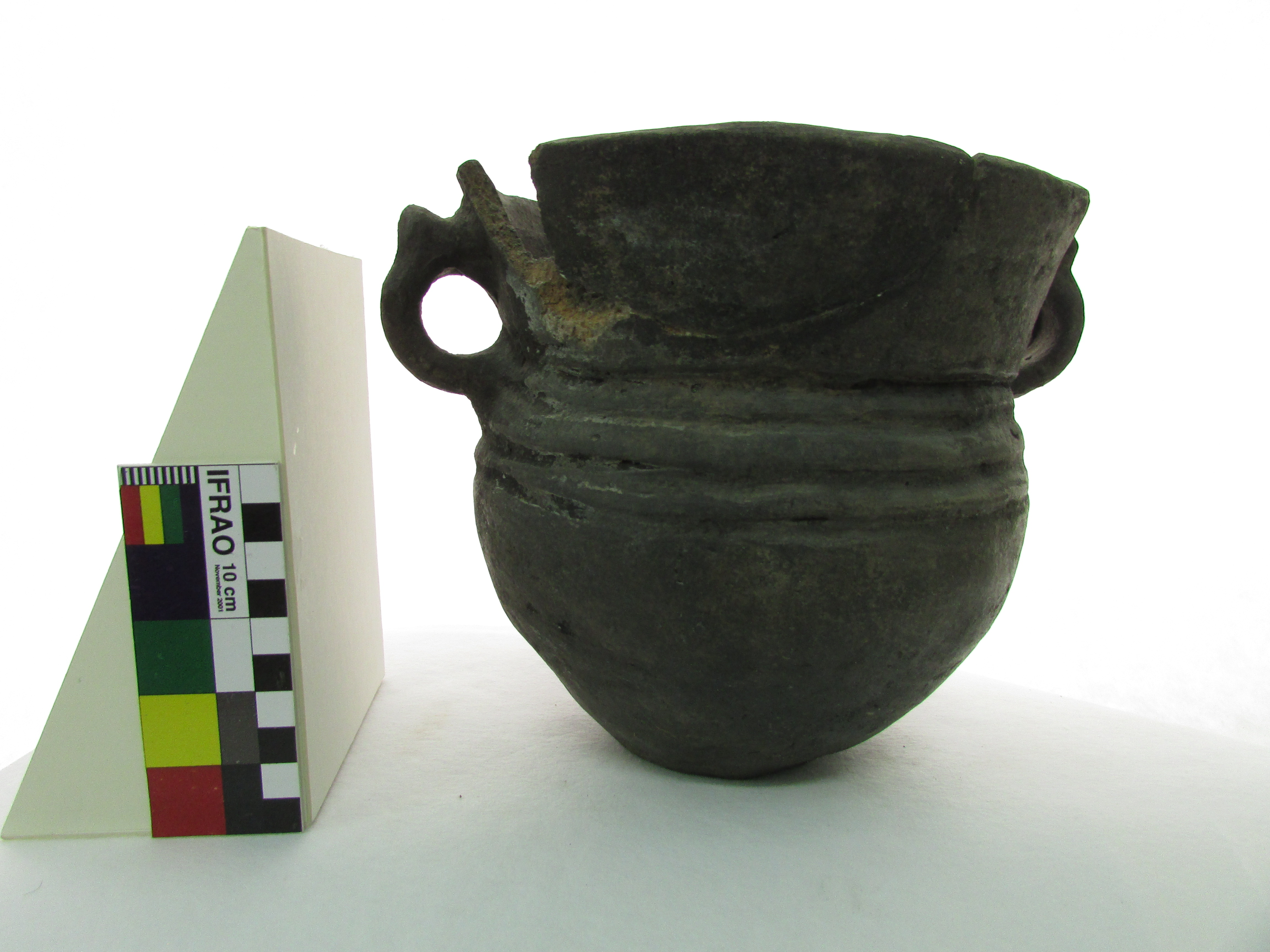
Indigenous ceramic vessel with grooves, and handles with bulges kept at the museum

=== Paleontology ===
The museum has an inventory of 118 fossil pieces, such as vertebrate and invertebrate specimens from different times.

Vertebrates

In the first place, there are remains of dinosaurs, like fragments of femur, ribs, and osteoderms of an unspecified sauropod, vertebrae of ornithopods and teeth of theropods. The museum also hosts some species of basal archosaurs, crocodiles, and turtle plates.

Moreover, there are remains of mammals, most of them are notoungulates and astrapotheres, as well as plates of glyptodontines.

Invertebrates

The museum hosts molluscs, such as nautiloids, ammonoids, bivalves, and brachiopods. There are also serpulids and decapods.

=== Current fauna ===
The museum contains material of regional fauna from the Río Negro Province. In the storage area, there is a vast collection of taxidermy of birds and mammals, desiccated insects and crabs, malacofauna, and various specimens preserved in formaldehyde.

== Gallery. Materials in the paleontological collection ==
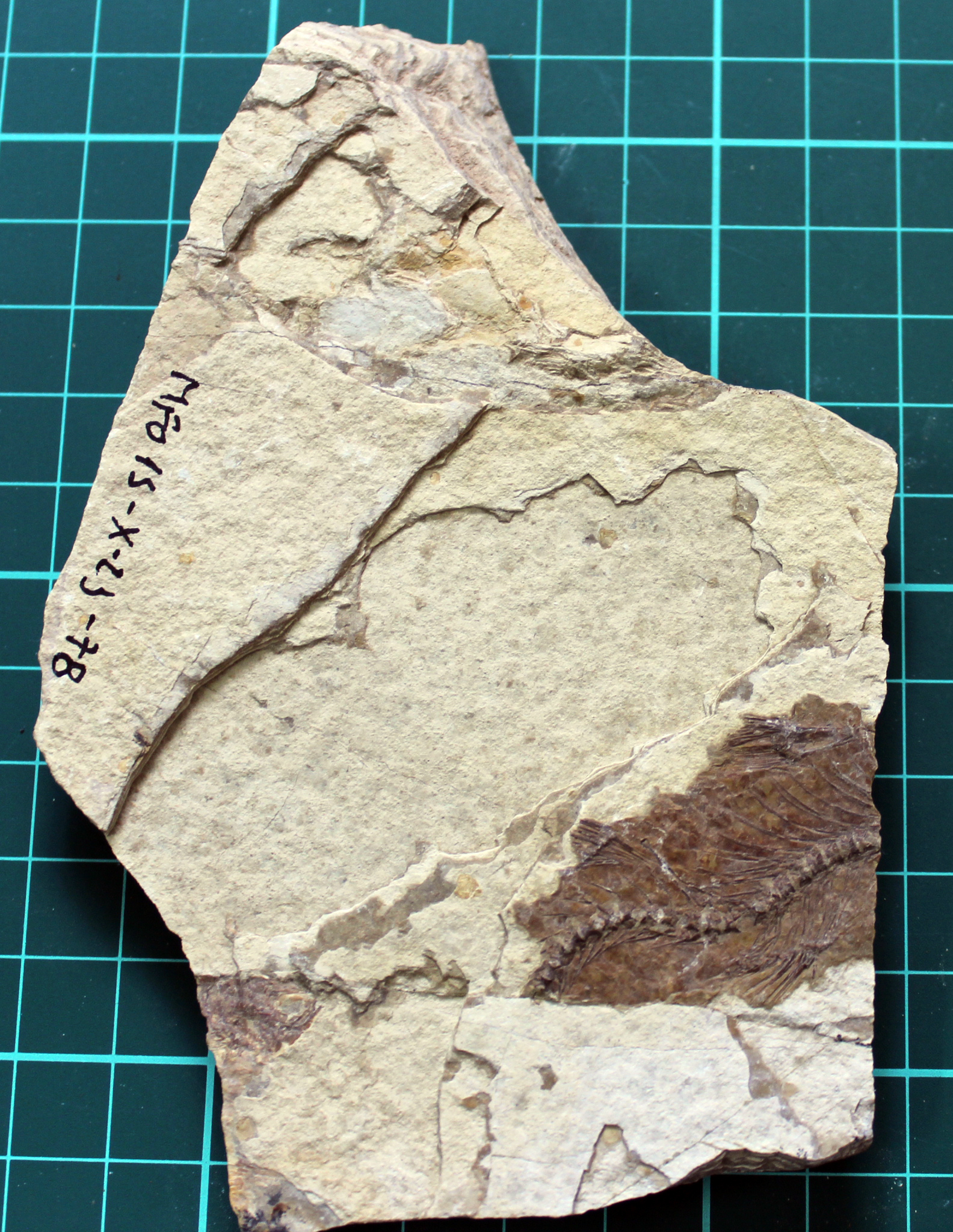
Fossil fish

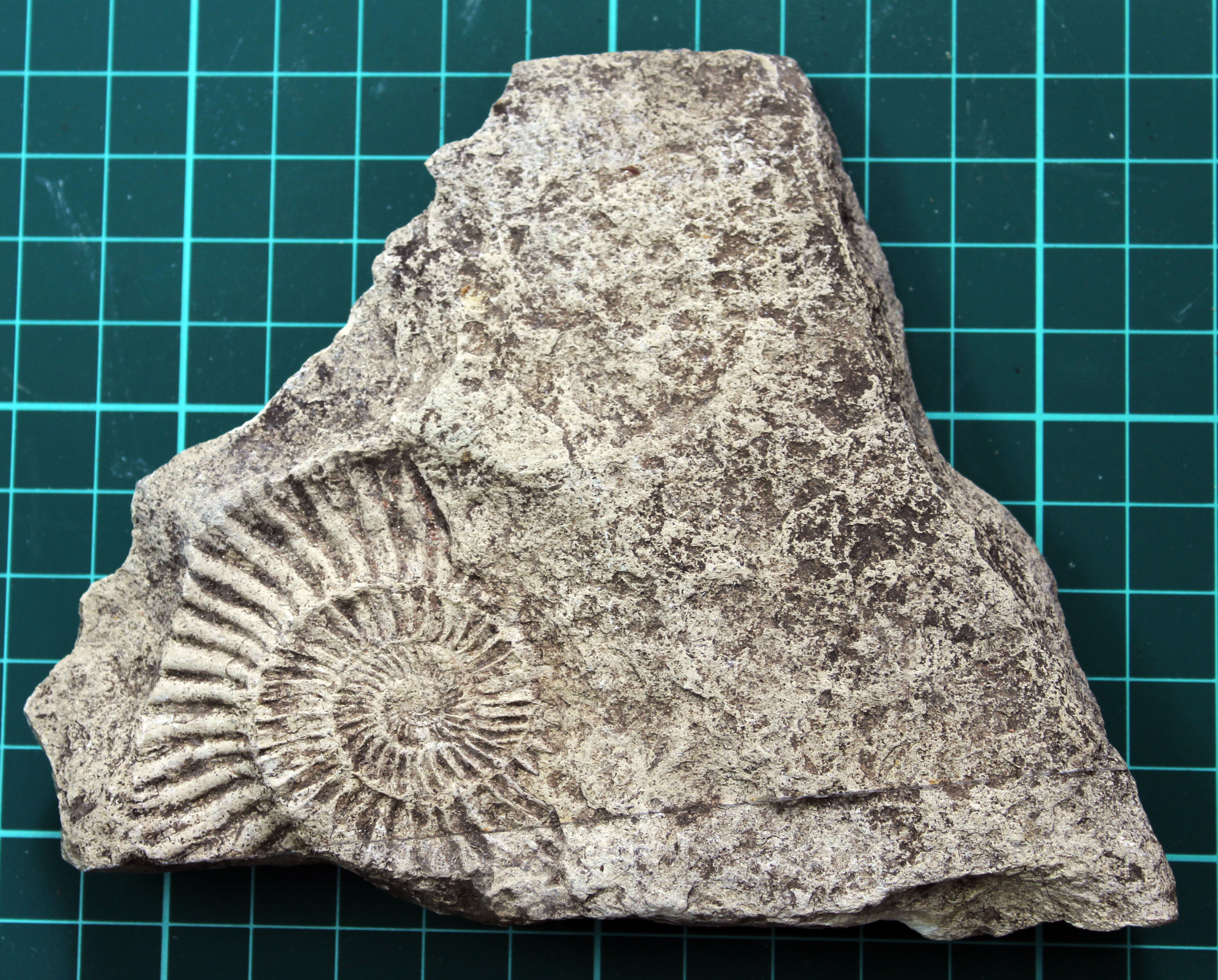
Ammonite

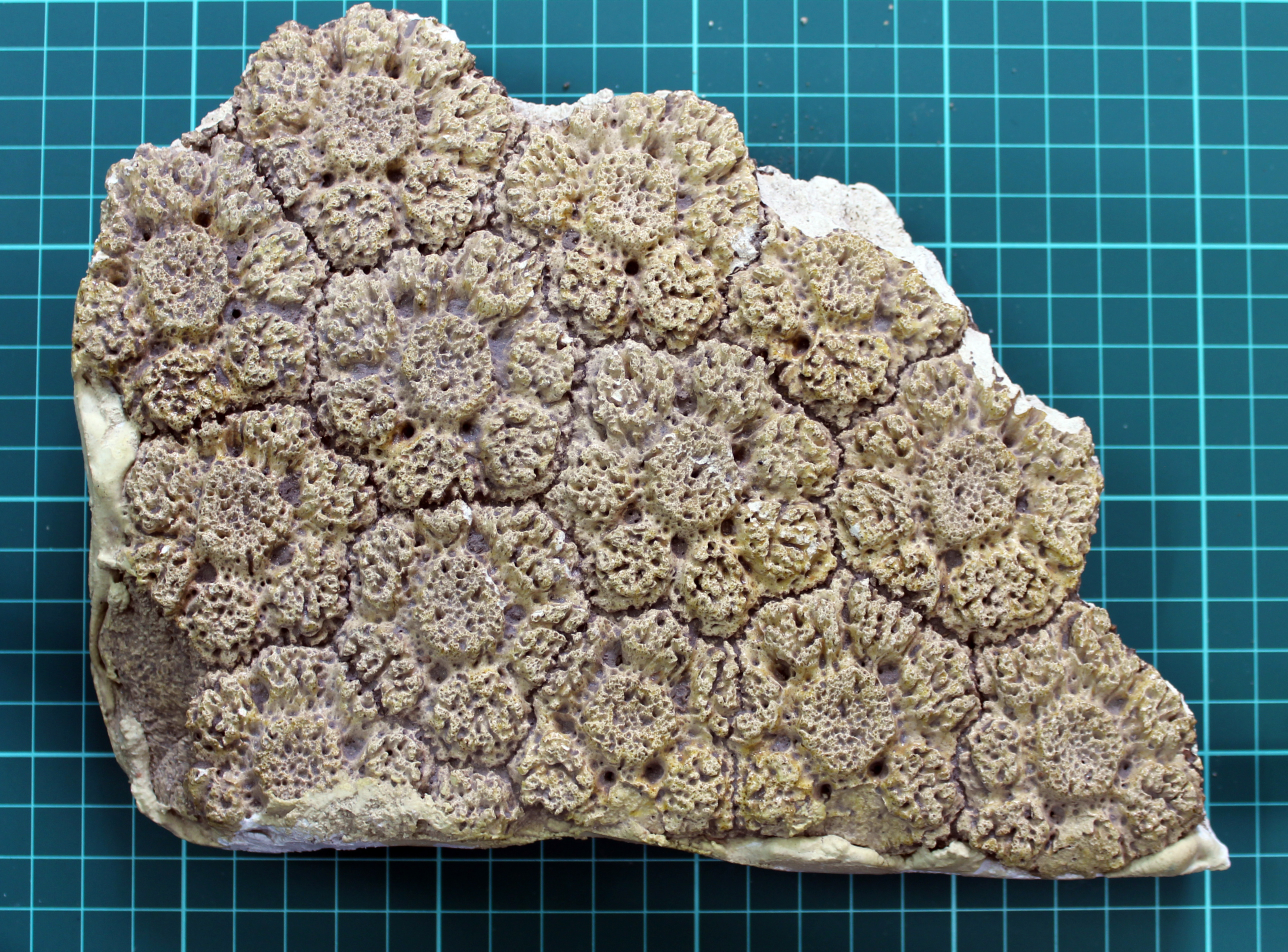
Glyptodon plates

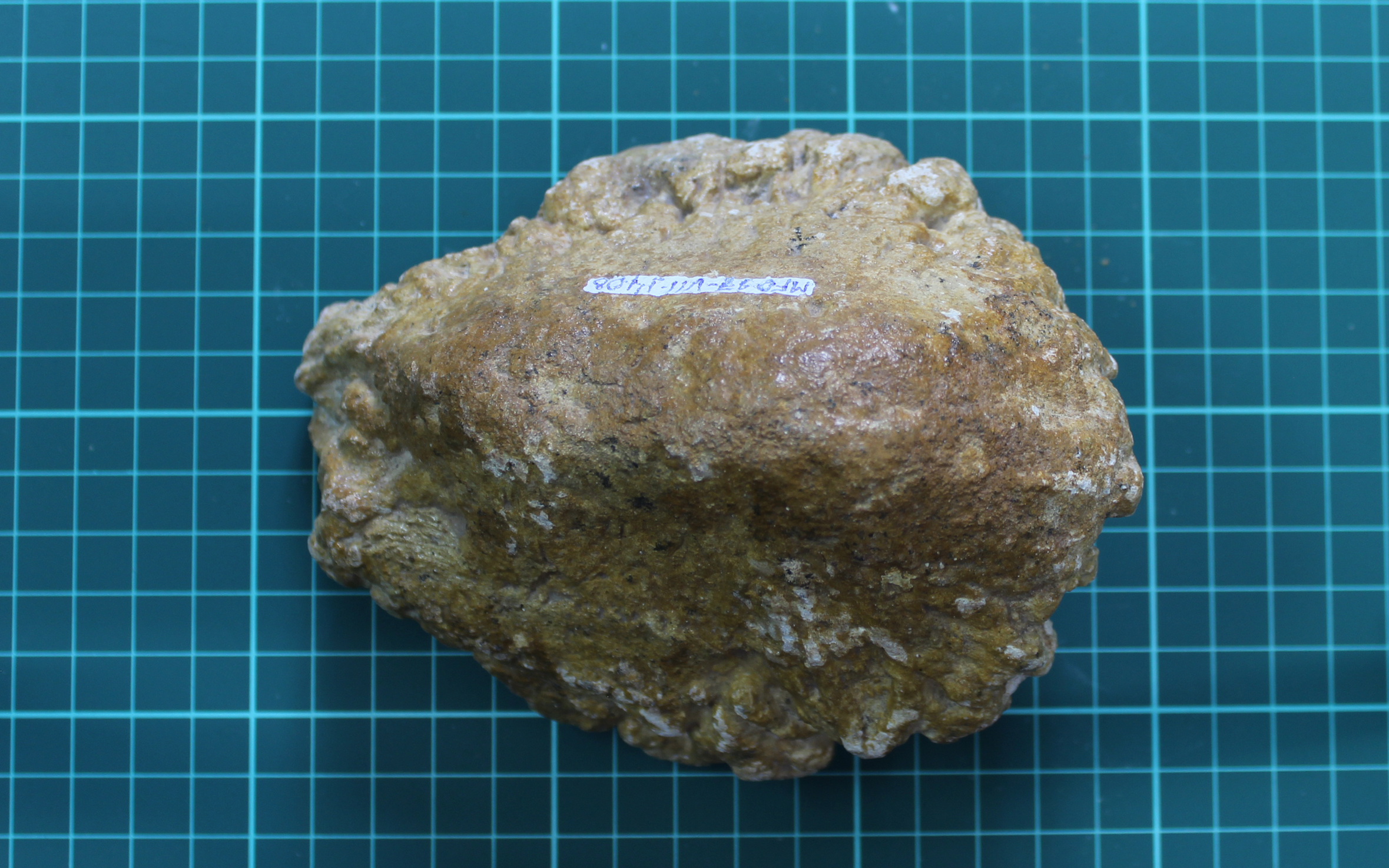
Sauropod dinosaur osteoderm

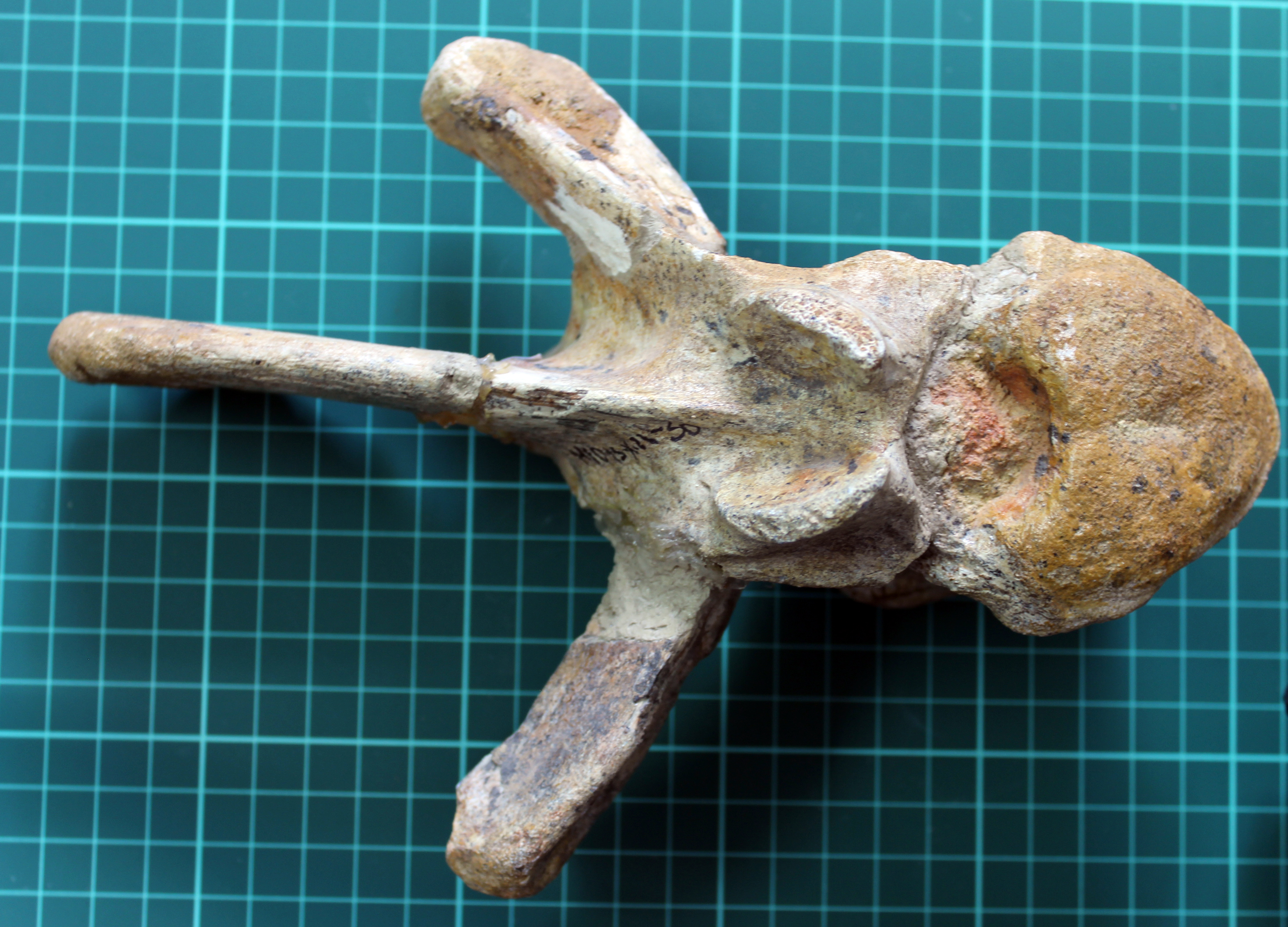
Ornithischian dinosaur vertebra

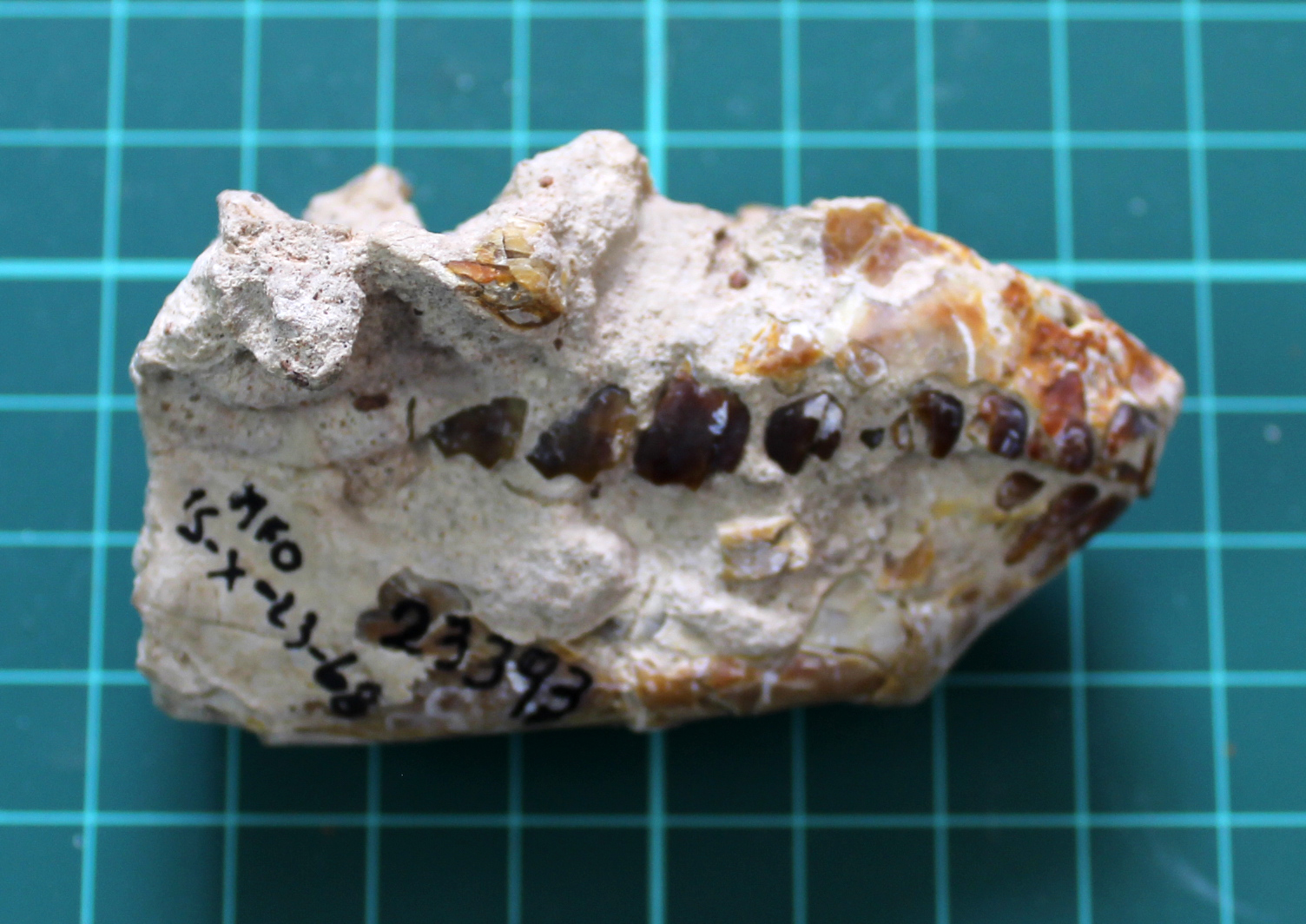
Dental series of a notoungulata mammal

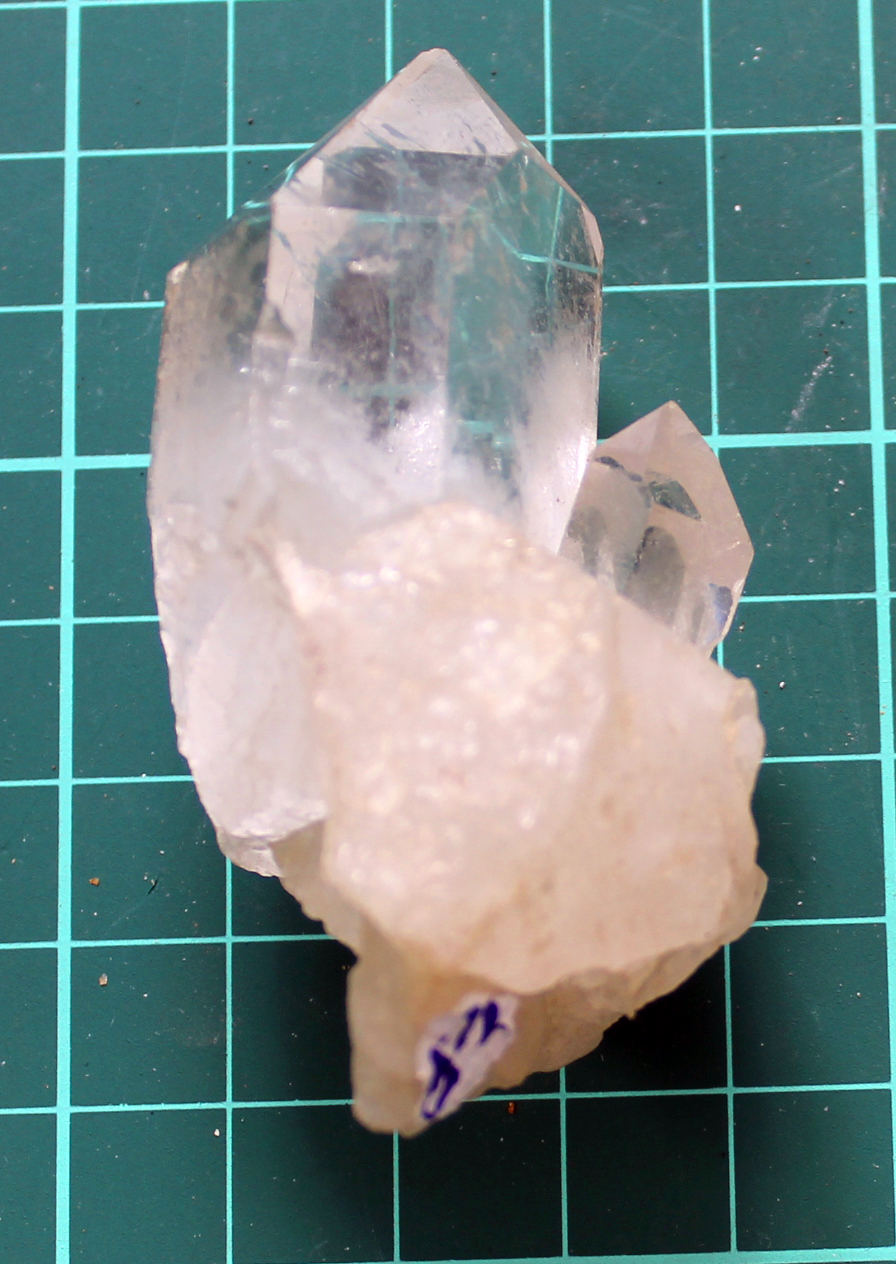
Crystal quartz

== See also ==
- General Fernández Oro railway station
