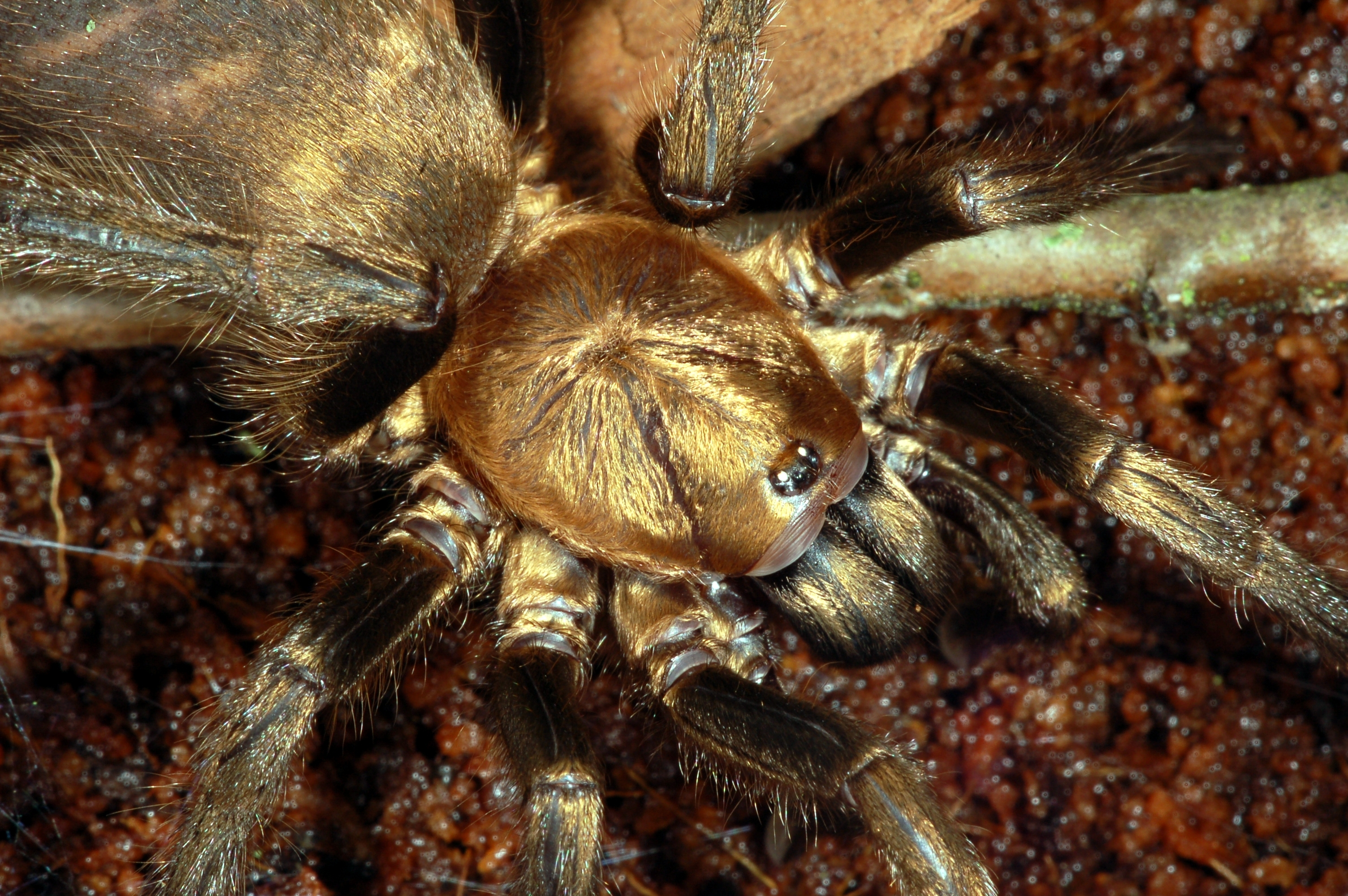
- Acanthogonatus francki

Scientific classification
- Kingdom: Animalia
- Phylum: Arthropoda
- Subphylum: Chelicerata
- Class: Arachnida
- Order: Araneae
- Infraorder: Mygalomorphae
- Family: Pycnothelidae
- Genus: Acanthogonatus; Karsch, 1880

Type species
- A. francki Karsch, 1880

Species
- 30, see text

Synonyms
- Chubutia Mello-Leitão, 1940; Tryssothele Simon, 1902

= Acanthogonatus =

Genus of spiders

Acanthogonatus is a genus of South American mygalomorph spiders in the family Pycnothelidae. It was first described by Ferdinand Anton Franz Karsch in 1880. Originally placed with the brushed trapdoor spiders, it was transferred to the funnel-web trapdoor spiders in 1985, then to the Pycnothelidae in 2020.

== Species ==
As of October 2023 it contains thirty species, found in Uruguay, Peru, Brazil, Argentina, and Chile:

- Acanthogonatus alegre Goloboff, 1995 – Chile
- Acanthogonatus birabeni Goloboff, 1995 – Argentina
- Acanthogonatus brunneus (Nicolet, 1849) – Chile
- Acanthogonatus campanae (Legendre & Calderón, 1984) – Chile
- Acanthogonatus centralis Goloboff, 1995 – Argentina
- Acanthogonatus chilechico Goloboff, 1995 – Chile
- Acanthogonatus confusus Goloboff, 1995 – Chile, Argentina
- Acanthogonatus ericae Indicatti, Lucas, Ott & Brescovit, 2008 – Brazil
- Acanthogonatus francki Karsch, 1880 (type) – Chile
- Acanthogonatus fuegianus (Simon, 1902) – Chile, Argentina
- Acanthogonatus hualpen Goloboff, 1995 – Chile
- Acanthogonatus huaquen Goloboff, 1995 – Chile
- Acanthogonatus incursus (Chamberlin, 1916) – Peru
- Acanthogonatus juncal Goloboff, 1995 – Chile
- Acanthogonatus minimus Indicatti, Folly-Ramos, Vargas, Lucas & Brescovit, 2015 – Brazil
- Acanthogonatus mulchen Goloboff, 1995 – Chile
- Acanthogonatus nahuelbuta Goloboff, 1995 – Chile
- Acanthogonatus notatus (Mello-Leitão, 1940) – Argentina
- Acanthogonatus parana Goloboff, 1995 – Argentina
- Acanthogonatus patagallina Goloboff, 1995 – Chile
- Acanthogonatus patagonicus (Simon, 1905) – Chile, Argentina
- Acanthogonatus peniasco Goloboff, 1995 – Chile
- Acanthogonatus pissii (Simon, 1889) – Chile
- Acanthogonatus quilocura Goloboff, 1995 – Chile
- Acanthogonatus recinto Goloboff, 1995 – Chile
- Acanthogonatus subcalpeianus (Nicolet, 1849) – Chile
- Acanthogonatus tacuariensis (Pérez-Miles & Capocasale, 1982) – Brazil, Uruguay
- Acanthogonatus tolhuaca Goloboff, 1995 – Chile
- Acanthogonatus vilches Goloboff, 1995 – Chile
- Acanthogonatus messii Signorotto & Ferretti, 2023

Formerly included:

- A. argentina (Simon, 1897) (Transferred to Stenoterommata)

Nomen dubium

- A. gounellei (Simon, 1886
