= Acanthogonatus chilechico =

Scientific classification
- Kingdom: Animalia
- Phylum: Arthropoda
- Subphylum: Chelicerata
- Class: Arachnida
- Order: Araneae
- Infraorder: Mygalomorphae
- Family: Pycnothelidae
- Genus: Acanthogonatus
- Species: A. chilechico

Binomial name
- Acanthogonatus chilechico Goloboff, 1995

Species of spider

Acanthogonatus chilechico is a mygalomorph spider of Chile, its name arising from its type locality: Chile Chico, General Carrera, Region XI (de Aysén), Chile. This species is most similar to A. notatus, but is distinguished by a less developed embolar flange and by having the basal portion of the bulb narrower in lateral view, and the presence of more numerous spines on its metatarsus I.

== Description ==
- Male: total length 11.74 millimetres (0.462 in); cephalothorax length 5.04 millimetres (0.198 in), width 4.18 millimetres (0.165 in); cephalic region length 3.22 millimetres (0.127 in), width 2.66 millimetres (0.105 in); medial ocular quadrangle 0.49 millimetres (0.019 in), width 0.87 millimetres (0.034 in); labium length 0.5 millimetres (0.020 in), width 0.93 millimetres (0.037 in); sternum length 2.90 millimetres (0.114 in), width 2.14 millimetres (0.084 in). Its labium has no cuspules. A serrula is present on the anterior edge only. Its sternal sigilla is small, oval and submarginal; it possesses a weakly rebordered sternum. Chelicerae: rastellum is formed by attenuate setae; its 6 teeth are widely spaced. Cheliceral tumescence is white and flat. Its metatarsus is almost straight. The entire spider is yellowish-brown in colour, while its abdomen has darker spots, forming a chevron.

== Distribution ==
It is known to habitate only in the type locality.
