= Acanthogonatus recinto =

Scientific classification
- Kingdom: Animalia
- Phylum: Arthropoda
- Subphylum: Chelicerata
- Class: Arachnida
- Order: Araneae
- Infraorder: Mygalomorphae
- Family: Pycnothelidae
- Genus: Acanthogonatus
- Species: A. recinto

Binomial name
- Acanthogonatus recinto Goloboff, 1995

Species of spider

Acanthogonatus recinto is a mygalomorph spider of Chile, its name arising from its type locality: Recinto, Nuble, Region VIII, Chile. Females are distinguished from those of A. franki by the spermathecae, having a more rounded and differentiated fundus and its basal portion extended internally, compared to those of A. peniasco with a narrower, longer and less sclerotized ducts; and from other species in the genus by having 1-1-1 P spines on its patella IV. Males differ from those of A.franki in the unique winglike projection at the base of the embolus.

== Description ==
- Male: total length 12.95 millimetres (0.510 in); cephalothorax length 5.80 millimetres (0.228 in), width 4.90 millimetres (0.193 in); cephalic region length 3.70 millimetres (0.146 in), width 3.05 millimetres (0.120 in); medial ocular quadrangle length (OQ) 0.52 millimetres (0.020 in), width 1 millimetre (0.039 in); labium length 0.42 millimetres (0.017 in), width 0.85 millimetres (0.033 in); sternum length 2.92 millimetres (0.115 in), width 2.32 millimetres (0.091 in). Its labium possesses 3 cuspules. A well-developed serrula is present; its teeth are widely spaced. Its sternal sigilla is small, oval and shallow; its sternum is rebordered. Chelicerae: rastellum is weak. A small, ventrally protruding cheliceral tumescence is present. Its leg I and tibia are cylindrical and straight, with no apophysis; its metatarsus is also straight. Its cephalothorax, legs, and palpi are a reddish-brown colour, while its abdomen is a light yellowish brown, with numerous dorsal mottles and a darker chevron.
- Female: total length 19.2 millimetres (0.76 in); cephalothorax length 6.9 millimetres (0.27 in), width 5.5 millimetres (0.22 in); cephalic region length 4.45 millimetres (0.175 in), width 3.7 millimetres (0.15 in); fovea width 0.7 millimetres (0.028 in); (OQ) 0.62 millimetres (0.024 in), width 1.14 millimetres (0.045 in); labium length 0.70 millimetres (0.028 in), width 1.17 millimetres (0.046 in); sternum length 3.52 millimetres (0.139 in), width 3.07 millimetres (0.121 in). Its cephalic region is of medium convexity; its fovea shaped straight to procurved, with a small posterior notch. Its labium possesses 4 cuspules. A well-developed serrula is present. Its sternal sigilla is small, oval and shallow; its sternum is rebordered. Chelicerae: rastellum is weak. Color similar to male.

== Distribution ==
It is found in only a few localities in Regions VIII and IX in Chile.
