= Acanthogonatus mulchen =

Scientific classification
- Kingdom: Animalia
- Phylum: Arthropoda
- Subphylum: Chelicerata
- Class: Arachnida
- Order: Araneae
- Infraorder: Mygalomorphae
- Family: Pycnothelidae
- Genus: Acanthogonatus
- Species: A. mulchen

Binomial name
- Acanthogonatus mulchen Goloboff, 1995

Species of spider

Acanthogonatus mulchen is a mygalomorph spider of Chile, named after its type locality: Alto Caledonia, east of Mulchén, Region VIII (Bío Bío Region). It is recognised by the long, narrow sternum. It differs from A. tolhuaca in the spermathecae having a less pronounced notch and the glandular areas on each side joining in the middle. It is larger (A. mulchen has a cephalothorax length of up to 13.2 millimetres (0.52 in), and a total length of 35.05 millimetres (1.380 in)) and differs from A. brunneus by its uniformly colored abdomen.

== Description ==
- Female: total length 29.5 millimetres (1.16 in); cephalothorax length 11.8 millimetres (0.46 in), width 9.5 millimetres (0.37 in); cephalic region length 7.7 millimetres (0.30 in), width 7.5 millimetres (0.30 in); fovea width 1.5 millimetres (0.059 in); medial ocular quadrangle length 1 millimetre (0.039 in), width 1.9 millimetres (0.075 in); labium length 0.95 millimetres (0.037 in), width 2 millimetres (0.079 in); sternum length 6.5 millimetres (0.26 in), width 4.8 millimetres (0.19 in). Its cephalic region is wide but low, while its fovea s straight to procurved with recurved ends, containing no posterior notch. Its labium possesses 2 cuspules. A serrula is present as a small patch of teeth only on the anterior face of the lobe. Its sternal sigilla is deep and long. Chelicerae: rastellum is absent. The entire spider is a uniform blackish-reddish-brown colour, except for one lighter spot in front of the abdomen. Juveniles have a similar color, but lighter, with diagonal lines of pale dots on the dorsum of their abdomen.

== Distribution ==
Only in its type locality. It is found in densely silk-lined burrows, between 15 and 20 millimetres (0.59 and 0.79 in) wide, which originate from under stones or at the base of trees. The burrow's mouth is funnel-like, with white silk extending so as to form a sort of collar.
