= Acanthogonatus tolhuaca =

Scientific classification
- Kingdom: Animalia
- Phylum: Arthropoda
- Subphylum: Chelicerata
- Class: Arachnida
- Order: Araneae
- Infraorder: Mygalomorphae
- Family: Pycnothelidae
- Genus: Acanthogonatus
- Species: A. tolhuaca

Binomial name
- Acanthogonatus tolhuaca Goloboff, 1995

Species of spider

Acanthogonatus tolhuaca is a mygalomorph spider of Chile, named after its type locality: Tolhuaca, Malleco, Region IX (de la Araucania). This species differs from A. mulchen in its wider sternum, smaller size, and the spermathecae having a more pronounced notch; from A. brunneus, it differs in the uniformly coloured abdomen.

== Description ==
- Female: total length 23.1 millimetres (0.91 in); cephalothorax length 9.4 millimetres (0.37 in), width 7.7 millimetres (0.30 in); cephalic region length 5.8 millimetres (0.23 in), width 5.6 millimetres (0.22 in); fovea width 0.95 millimetres (0.037 in); medial ocular quadrangle length 0.72 millimetres (0.028 in), width 1.57 millimetres (0.062 in); labium length 0.82 millimetres (0.032 in), width 1.57 millimetres (0.062 in); sternum length 4.95 millimetres (0.195 in), width 3.82 millimetres (0.150 in). Its cephalic region is wide but low, while its fovea is slightly procurved, with a small posterior notch. Its labium possesses no cuspules. A serrula is present on the anterior face of the lobe. Its sternal sigilla is small and oval (less elongated than A. Mulchen). Chelicerae: rastellum is absent. The spermathecal notch is more pronounced than in A. Mulchen. The entire spider is a reddish-blackish brown colour, while the abdomen has a paler anterodorsal spot.

== Distribution ==
Only in Malleco Province.
