= Acanthogonatus nahuelbuta =

Scientific classification
- Kingdom: Animalia
- Phylum: Arthropoda
- Subphylum: Chelicerata
- Class: Arachnida
- Order: Araneae
- Infraorder: Mygalomorphae
- Family: Pycnothelidae
- Genus: Acanthogonatus
- Species: A. nahuelbuta

Binomial name
- Acanthogonatus nahuelbuta Goloboff, 1995

Species of spider

Acanthogonatus nahuelbuta is a mygalomorph spider of Chile, named after its type locality: Piedra del Águila, Parque Nacional Nahuel-Buta, Malleco. Males differ from A. patagallina by having the basal portion of the bulb less rounded and the basal loop of the bulbal duct less sinuous; and from those of A. hualpen by the differently shaped embolus and the palpal tibia with the apical two-thirds (instead of its apical one-third) tapering gradually and having thickened setae.

== Description ==
- Male: total length 13.38 millimetres (0.527 in); cephalothorax length 5.26 millimetres (0.207 in), width 3.34 millimetres (0.131 in); cephalic region length 4.52 millimetres (0.178 in), width 2.72 millimetres (0.107 in); medial ocular quadrangle (OQ) length 0.63 millimetres (0.025 in), width 1.11 millimetres (0.044 in); fovea width 0.67 millimetres (0.026 in); labium length 0.51 millimetres (0.020 in), width 1.03 millimetres (0.041 in); sternum length 2.97 millimetres (0.117 in), width 2.44 millimetres (0.096 in). Its labium possesses no cuspules. A serrula is present. Its sternal sigilla is small, oval and submarginal, while its sternum is strongly rebordered. Chelicerae: rastellum is absent. A small, pallid and protruding cheliceral tumescence is present. Colour as in female.
- Female: total length 17.54 millimetres (0.691 in); cephalothorax length 6.19 millimetres (0.244 in), width 5.29 millimetres (0.208 in); cephalic region length 4.14 millimetres (0.163 in), width 3.84 millimetres (0.151 in); fovea width 0.76 millimetres (0.030 in); OQ length 0.61 millimetres (0.024 in), width 1.25 millimetres (0.049 in); labium length 0.67 millimetres (0.026 in), width 1.19 millimetres (0.047 in);sternum length 1.75 millimetres (0.069 in), width 1.55 millimetres (0.061 in). Its cephalic region is strongly convex, with a sinuous fovea with short posterior medial notch. Its labium possesses 2 cuspules. A serrula is present. Sternal sigilla is small and oval, while its sternum is rebordered. Chelicerae: rastellum is absent. Its cephalothorax and legs are a reddish-brown colour, while its abdomen is yellowish and densely mottled with dark brown.

== Distribution ==
Provinces of Bío-Bío and Malleco, in Region VIII, Chile.
