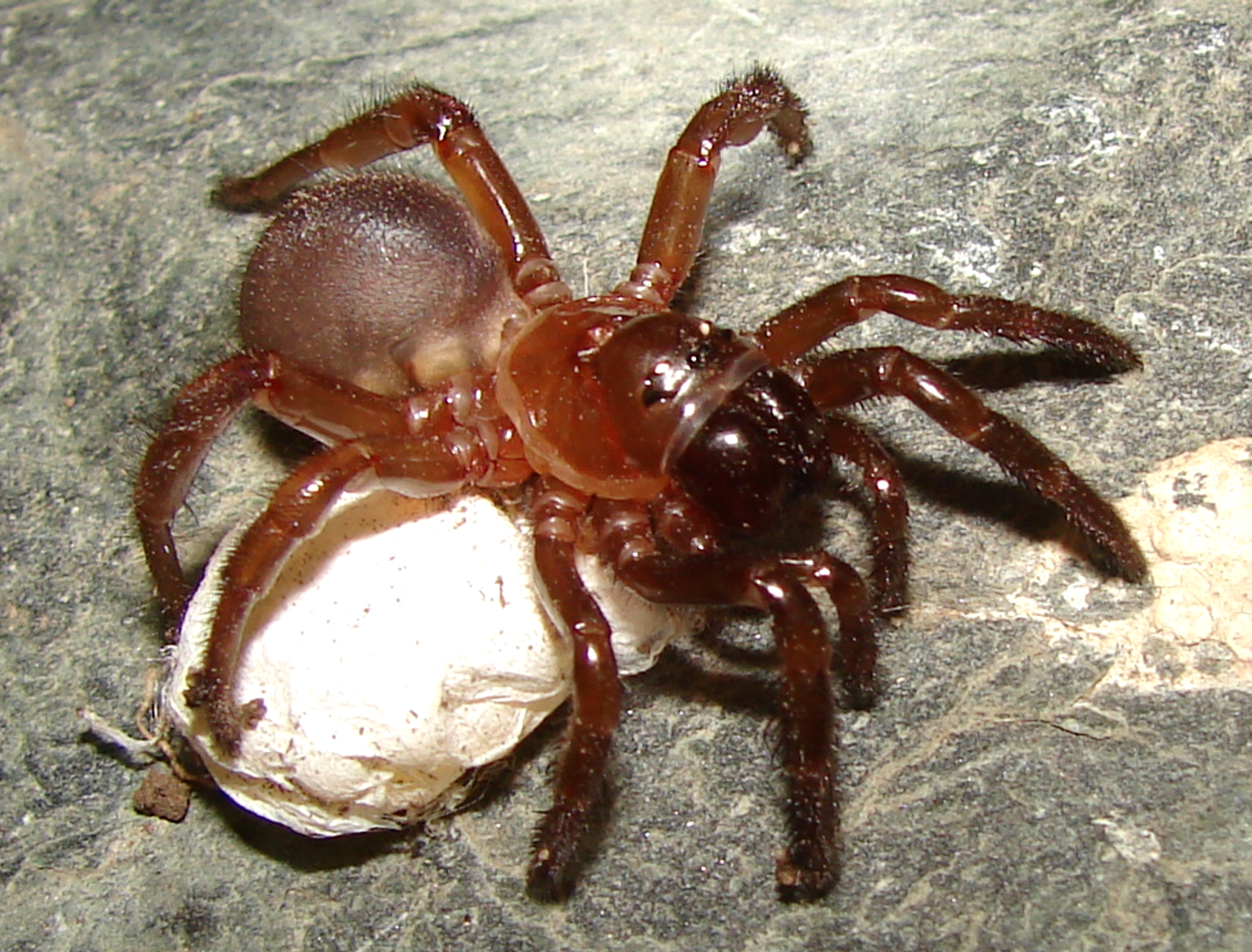
- Adult female with egg sac
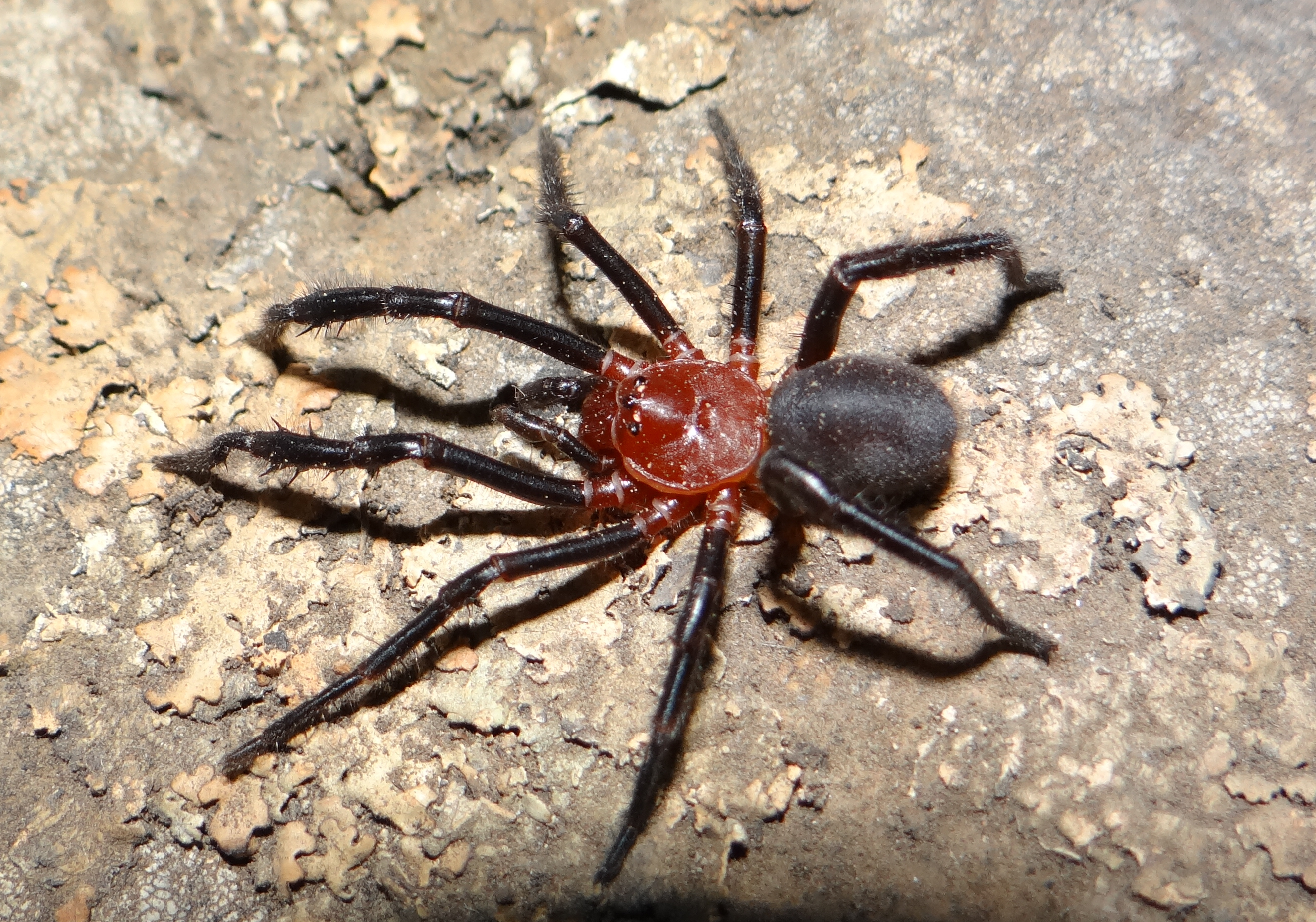
- Adult male

Scientific classification
- Kingdom: Animalia
- Phylum: Arthropoda
- Subphylum: Chelicerata
- Class: Arachnida
- Order: Araneae
- Infraorder: Mygalomorphae
- Family: Migidae
- Genus: Calathotarsus
- Species: C. simoni

Binomial name
- Calathotarsus simoni Schiapelli & Gerschman, 1975

= Calathotarsus simoni =

Tree trapdoor spider from Argentina

Calathotarsus simoni is a species of spider in the family Migidae, found in Argentina. Typical of the trapdoor families of spiders, rather than build webs, this spider creates burrows hidden by a door constructed of nearby detritus camouflaging its location.
