= Acanthogonatus birabeni =

Scientific classification
- Kingdom: Animalia
- Phylum: Arthropoda
- Subphylum: Chelicerata
- Class: Arachnida
- Order: Araneae
- Infraorder: Mygalomorphae
- Family: Pycnothelidae
- Genus: Acanthogonatus
- Species: A. birabeni

Binomial name
- Acanthogonatus birabeni Goloboff, 1995

Species of spider

Acanthogonatus birabeni is a mygalomorph spider of Argentina, named after Max Birabén, an Argentinian arachnologist. It differs from others in the patagonicus group by its smaller size and (except for A. fuegianus) by the less developed bulb keels.

== Description ==
- Male: total length 7.9 millimetres (0.31 in); cephalothorax length 3.27 millimetres (0.129 in), width 2.62 millimetres (0.103 in); cephalic region length 2 millimetres (0.079 in), width 1.65 millimetres (0.065 in); medial ocular quadrangle length 0.35 millimetres (0.014 in), width 0.69 millimetres (0.027 in); labium length 0.25 millimetres (0.0098 in), width 0.61 millimetres (0.024 in);sternum length 1.87 millimetres (0.074 in), width 1.46 millimetres (0.057 in). Its labium possesses no cuspules. A serrula is apparently present as a small patch of denticles. Its posterior sternal sigilla is small, shallow and marginal; its sternum weakly rebordered. Chelicerae: rastellum is formed by long, thin, stiff setae. Cheliceral tumescence is present. Leg I: tibia long and cylindrical, with an apical prolateral spur typical for this genus; metatarsus evenly curved downward in its basal third, the remainder being straight. The entire spider is a light yellow colour, with a dorsal abdominal pattern similar to that in A. patagonicus.

== Distribution ==
Known only from its type locality: Puerto Madryn, Chubut, Argentina.
