= Acanthogonatus vilches =

Scientific classification
- Kingdom: Animalia
- Phylum: Arthropoda
- Subphylum: Chelicerata
- Class: Arachnida
- Order: Araneae
- Infraorder: Mygalomorphae
- Family: Pycnothelidae
- Genus: Acanthogonatus
- Species: A. vilches

Binomial name
- Acanthogonatus vilches Goloboff, 1995

Species of spider

Acanthogonatus vilches is a mygalomorph spider of Chile, named after its type locality: Gil de Vilches, Talca, Region VII (del Maule Region). Females differ from other species in the nahuelbuta group by their less modified spermathecae.

== Description ==
- Female: total length 14.51 millimetres (0.571 in); cephalothorax length 5.16 millimetres (0.203 in), width 4.02 millimetres (0.158 in); cephalic region length 3.53 millimetres (0.139 in), width 3.03 millimetres (0.119 in); fovea width 0.5 millimetres (0.020 in); medial ocular quadrangle length 0.47 millimetres (0.019 in), width 0.94 millimetres (0.037 in); labium length 0.62 millimetres (0.024 in), width 1.17 millimetres (0.046 in); sternum length 1.51 millimetres (0.059 in), width 1.28 millimetres (0.050 in). Its cephalic region is moderately convex, with a procurved fovea. Its labium possesses 1 cuspule. A serrula is present. Its sternal sigilla is small and oval, its sternum rebordered. Chelicerae: rastellum is weak, with long setae. Its book lung openings are wide and oval, more rounded than in other Acanthogonatus. Its cephalothorax and legs are yellowish brown, while its abdomen is mottled with a dark brown colour.

== Distribution ==
Only in its type locality.
