= Acanthogonatus alegre =

Scientific classification
- Kingdom: Animalia
- Phylum: Arthropoda
- Subphylum: Chelicerata
- Class: Arachnida
- Order: Araneae
- Infraorder: Mygalomorphae
- Family: Pycnothelidae
- Genus: Acanthogonatus
- Species: A. alegre

Binomial name
- Acanthogonatus alegre Goloboff, 1995

Species of spider

Acanthogonatus alegre is a mygalomorph spider of Chile, its name using the Spanish word for “happy”, referring to the aspect of a happy face that the female epigastrium has in posterior view. Females are recognized by the epigastrium produced in a membranous extension and the long, slender and bifurcated spermathecae.

== Description ==
- Female: total length 23.3 millimetres (0.92 in); cephalothorax length 8.4 millimetres (0.33 in), width 6.2 millimetres (0.24 in); cephalic region length 5.35 millimetres (0.211 in), width 4.2 millimetres (0.17 in); fovea width 0.75 millimetres (0.030 in); medial ocular quadrangle length 0.67 millimetres (0.026 in), width 1.25 millimetres (0.049 in); labium length 0.67 millimetres (0.026 in), width 1.37 millimetres (0.054 in); sternum length 4.12 millimetres (0.162 in), width 3.1 millimetres (0.12 in). Its cephalic region is flat, low and narrow, with its fovea slightly procurved and with a small posterior notch. Its labium possesses 1 cuspule. A well-developed serrula is present. Its sternal sigilla is oval, elongated, small and shallow; its sternum is rebordered. Chelicerae: rastellum is absent. Its spermathecae has a conspicuous epigastric projection. Its cephalothorax, legs and chelicerae are an olive brown colour with golden hairs, while its abdomen is lighter, with a darker chevron similar to the one in A. campanae.

== Distribution ==
Known only from its type locality: Antofagasta, (Region II) Chile.

== See also ==
- Spider anatomy
- Regions of Chile
