= General Fernández Oro =

Coordinates: 38°57′S 67°55′W

- Municipality and village
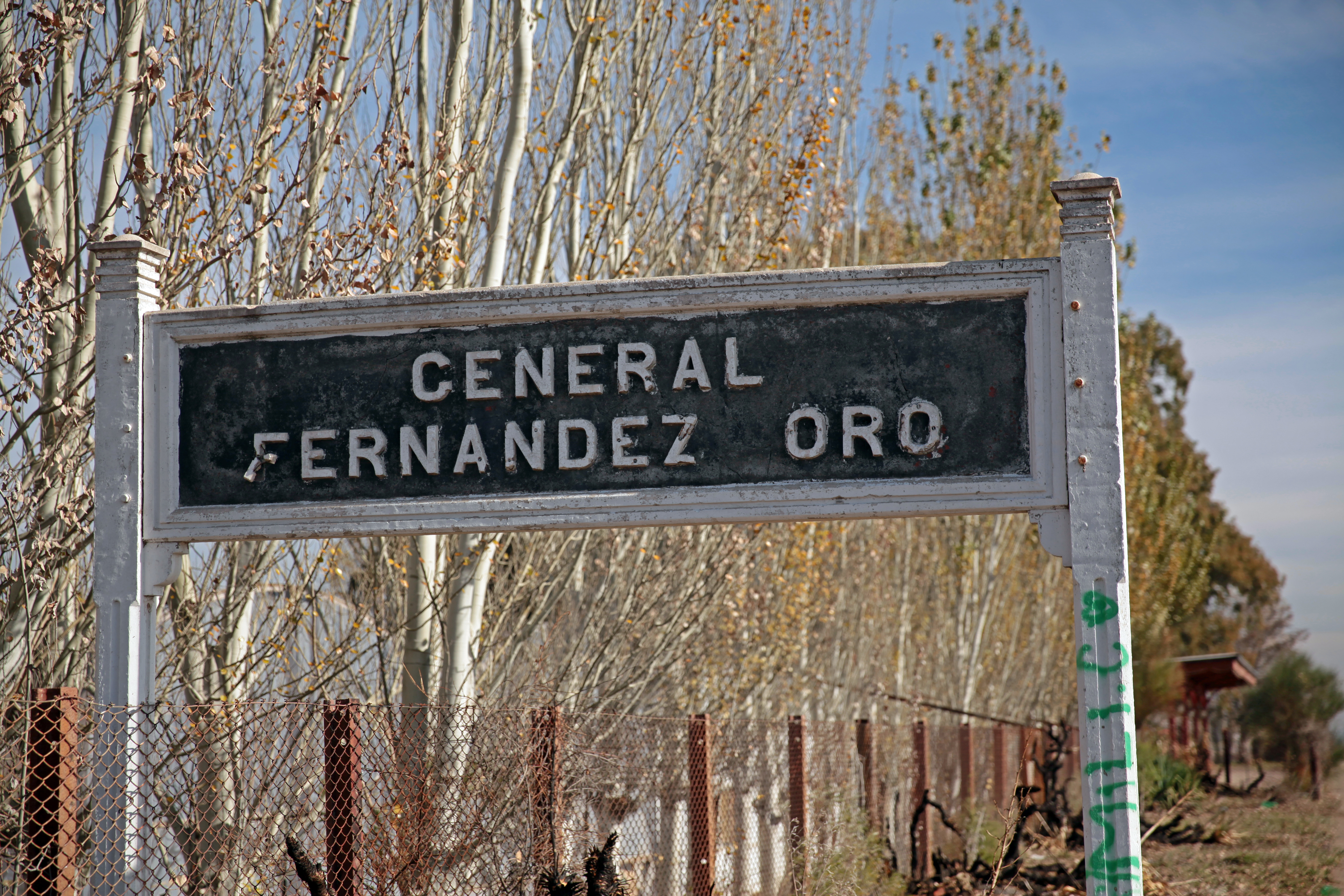
- General Fernández Oro train station nomenclator

- Flag
- Interactive map of General Fernández Oro
- Country: Argentina
- Province: (Río Negro Province) Río Negro
- Time zone: UTC−3 (ART)
- Climate: BWk

General Fernández Oro is a city in the west of Río Negro Province in Argentina, located on the side of Provincial Route 65, on the northern bank of the Río Negro river.

== Toponymy ==
The city was named after General Manuel Fernández Oro, who participated in the Conquest of the Desert of 1879.

== Population ==
According to the census carried out in 2010, the city has a population of 8,629 inhabitants. This census includes the people living in rural areas on the outskirts of the city. The demographic growth rate increased by 2.63% since the 2001 census, one of the highest rates among the biggest cities of the province. In 2001, the area had 6,813 inhabitants.

The city currently has 6,772 inhabitants (INDEC, 2010), representing an increase of 33% compared to the previous census (INDEC, 2001) which registered a population of 5,067 inhabitants.

== History ==
On 29 May 1942 the Governance of Río Negro decreed the establishment of the Township of General Fernández Oro.

However, the precise definition of its foundation date is still under discussion. According to Decree Order 161 as of 16 March 1971, signed by the then governor Requeijo, the date in which Fernández Oro was founded is established as a local holiday: 19 May 1931. Henceforth, this date is celebrated annually as the city's anniversary. The question that remains is what historical fact is remembered on that date. If the inauguration of the railway station is taken into account, the year would be 1928. If it were the change of name of the station, then the date would be 18 May, because on that day the name changed from "Kilómetro 1181" to "General Fernández Oro".

As it has already been pointed out, the first Township was approved by a Decree Order issued by the Governance of the National Territory of Río Negro in May 1942 and passed by Presidential Decree on the 12th of December in the same year, thereby creating the Municipality of Fernández Oro. As can be seen, no historical fact relevant to the population is related to the 18th of May, the city's official foundation date.

Other significant facts had already taken place in the region, and might as well be resignified as a foundation date.

Formerly, and since 1927, there already was a population conglomerate, home of the first settlers, some institutions such as Primary School 40, Club Despertar (Spanish for Awakening Club), later called Club Social y Deportivo Fernández Oro and Primary School 102; the first general store is built, and the first families start to settle.

Estación Cultural Lucinda Larrosa Museum is an exhibition center in General Fernández Oro. First conceived as a museum of natural science and regional history, nowadays features periodical artistic exhibitions that revisits the history of Patagonia.

== Economy ==
The city's main economic activity is fruticulture. Among the fruits produced are pip fruits, such as apples and pears, and stone fruits, such as peaches and plums. However, other harvests, such as hop, contribute to the city's economy.

== Touristic attractions ==
One of the main touristic attractions is Estación Cultural Lucinda Larrosa Museum. This museum is considered one of the most important museums in the province of Río Negro, mainly due to its important collection of agricultural machinery, which is part of the productive circuit of the region of Alto Valle. It is located at kilometre 1181 of provincial route N°65. This museum's name comes from the name of the wife of the city's founder, Lucinda Gómez Larrosa, who died in Buenos Aires in 1910, and from the fact that its building is the former General Fernández Oro Railway Station, of the General Roca Railway.

In 1999, the building was opened as a museum by means of an initiative carried out by some of the city's residents. After having been closed for the public for many years, this place was re-opened in 2016, with a discursive twist in its aesthetic, cultural, historical and social inception, with which it aspires to settle in the community and the region as a cultural space open to debate and reflection, far from something definitive and static. It offers an agenda of monthly activities that inspire people to participate in, travel along, think about and inhabit the territory.

The natural attractions are those having to do with the irrigation oasis that were triggered by the construction of irrigation canals stemming from Ingeniero Ballester Dam. The riverside environment is an excellent leisure time option within General Fernández Oro's city limits.

== Parishes of the Roman Catholic Church in General Fernández Oro ==
Catholic Church
Diocese	Higher Valley of the Negro River
Parish	Santa María Goretti
