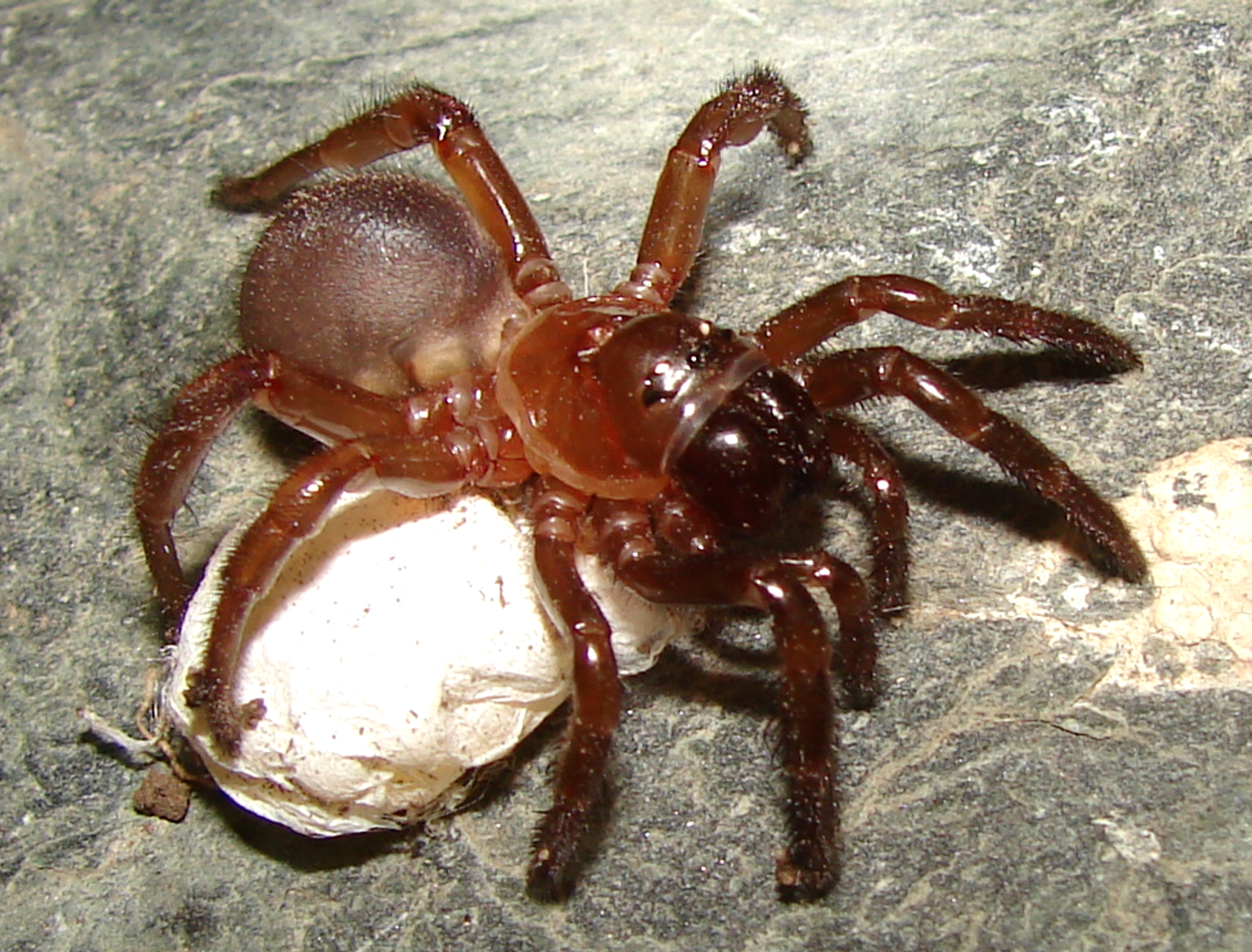
- Female C. simoni

Scientific classification
- Kingdom: Animalia
- Phylum: Arthropoda
- Subphylum: Chelicerata
- Class: Arachnida
- Order: Araneae
- Infraorder: Mygalomorphae
- Family: Migidae
- Genus: Calathotarsus; Simon

= Calathotarsus =

Genus of spiders

Calathotarsus is a genus of spiders in the family Migidae. It was first described in 1903 by Eugène Simon. As of 2022, it contains 4 species, occurring in Chile and Argentina.

== Species ==
- Calathotarsus coronatus Simon, 1903 – Chile
- Calathotarsus fangioi (Ferretti, Soresi, González & Arnedo, 2019) – Argentina
- Calathotarsus pihuychen Goloboff, 1991 – Chile
- Calathotarsus simoni Schiapelli & Gerschman, 1975 – Argentina
