= María Juncal =

Spanish flamenco dancer

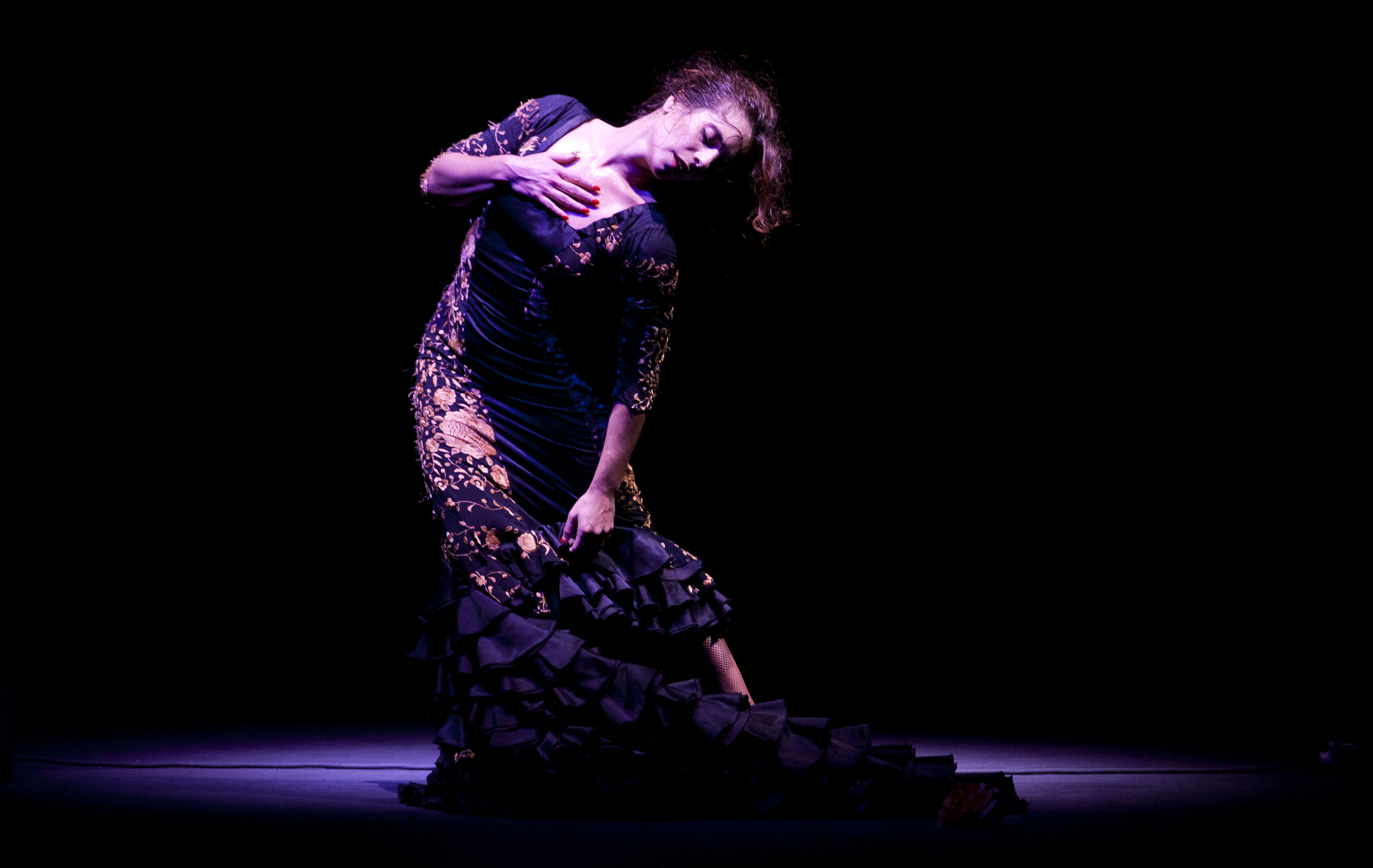
- María Juncal (2013)
- Born: ca. 1981; Las Palmas de Gran Canaria, Spain
- Occupation: flamenco dancer

María Juncal (b. Las Palmas de Gran Canaria, ca. 1981) is a Spanish flamenco dancer who has toured in Belgium, Canada, China, Cuba, France, Germany, Greece, Holland, Israel, Italy, Japan, Mexico, Spain, the U.S., and Venezuela. She has participated in different shows such as Jarocho under the direction of Richard O'Neal, assistant director of Riverdance, and has collaborated as a choreographer with Spain's women's national artistic gymnastics team, 2012. In addition to receiving the Excelencias Cuba Award 2018 2018 for her work in developing Cuban flamenco art, and winning the Antonio Gades National Award of Flamenco Dance, she was voted the best flamenco dancer at the Festival Del Cante De Las Minas.

== Biography ==
María Juncal was born into a family with flamenco roots, the Borrull family.

Juncal's family members involved in flamenco history include her grandmother, great-grandmother, great-great-grandmother, aunts, and uncles. A painting (La Algeria) of an aunt (Aunt Julia) in mid-dance is held in Madrid’s Museo del Prado. Miguel Borull, Julia Borull, Concha Borull, Isabel Borull, and Mercedes Borull (La Gitana Blanca) are family members.

Juncal began her career studying ballet and classical Spanish dance in Santa Cruz de Tenerife, where she was a student of Miguel Navarro, Rosalina Ripoll, and her great-aunt, Trini Borrull. Later, Juncal continued her studies at the Centro de Arte Flamenco y Danza Española Amor de Dios in Madrid. Among the teachers who trained her were Cristóbal Reyes, La Tati, El Güito, Manolete, Ciro, and Merche Esmeralda in flamenco; Nadine Boisaubert and Dagmara Brown in ballet; and Trini Borrull and Rosalina Ripoll in classical Spanish dance.

Juncal has been in charge of the artistic and general direction of different shows that she performs with her company, such as: "La gitana Blanca", "Azabache y miel", "Murmullos y Geranios", "Instantes", "Destemplao", "La Hora de los Milagros", "Tercera Llamada junto al Gran maestro Ciro", and "Quimera".

In 2011, she made a documentary entitled Flamenco de raíz, which was nominated for five Goya Awards.

== Event participation ==
Juncal has participated in several international dance events such as:

Event	Year	Location
Festival of Performing Arts	2001 y 2002	Cleveland
Festival Verano de la Villa	2002	Madrid
Festival de los Patios Cordobeses	2005	Córdoba)
Programa de Actividades. CC. Isabel de Farnesio	2005	
VII Feria de Abril en Irún	2005	Iran
Festival Internacional de Las Minas	2005	
20.º Festival Internacional de Ballet de la Habana	2005	Havana
Festival Flamenco Joven en el Teatro	2006	Madrid
31avo Festival Internacional Chateauroux	2006	France
XXXII Festival Flamenco de Cáceres	2006	
Festival Flamenco de Milán	2007	Milan
Festival Internacional de Danza de Normandía	2007	Normandy
Festival de Jerez	2007	
Suma Flamenca de Madrid	2007	Madrid
Festival de Música en la Sierra	2007	Madrid
Festival Internacional de Danza en Vancouver	2009	Canada
10th Anniversary Celebretion Flamenco Arts Festival	2009	
Festival Internacional de Danza Santiago de Querétaro	2007 y 2011	Mexico
VI Festival de Flamenco en San Blas	2010	México
Concierto Andaluz y Gala Flamenco Washington	2011	Washington, D.C.
Festival de Música Clásica del Mar Muerto	2011	Israel
Salón de los espejos	2011	Barcelona
Seminario en la Habana:“Flamenco por la Vida”	2012	Havana
Festival de Eindhoven	2012	
Gira por Holanda con 28 funciones por todo el país	2012	
Festival Internacional Ceiba	2013	Tabasco, México
Festival Internacional de la Cultura Maya	2014	Mérida, Yucatán, México

== Awards and honours ==
Award	Year
Premio Nacional de Danza Flamenca Antonio Gades en Córdoba	2004
Primer Premio de Baile Flamenco y Trofeo “Desplante”	2006
Premio a la mejor solista flamenca con la obra “El encierro de Ana Frank”	2006
Mención de Honor del Gran Teatro de la Habana	2006
Embajadora Universal del Flamenco por el DIF Estatal de Tabasco, México	2011
