= Acanthogonatus parana =

Scientific classification
- Kingdom: Animalia
- Phylum: Arthropoda
- Subphylum: Chelicerata
- Class: Arachnida
- Order: Araneae
- Infraorder: Mygalomorphae
- Family: Pycnothelidae
- Genus: Acanthogonatus
- Species: A. parana

Binomial name
- Acanthogonatus parana Goloboff, 1995

Species of spider

Acanthogonatus parana is a mygalomorph spider of Argentina, its name referring to its type locality: Paraná, Entre Ríos. Females are most similar to those of A. centralis, but are distinguished by the narrow fundus of the spermathecae.

== Description ==
- Female: total length 16.4 millimetres (0.65 in); cephalothorax length 6.77 millimetres (0.267 in), width 4.95 millimetres (0.195 in); cephalic region length 4.3 millimetres (0.17 in), width 3.4 millimetres (0.13 in); fovea width 0.67 millimetres (0.026 in); medial ocular quadrangle length 0.67 millimetres (0.026 in), width 1.28 millimetres (0.050 in); labium length 0.61 millimetres (0.024 in), width 1.14 millimetres (0.045 in); sternum length 1.77 millimetres (0.070 in), width 1.53 millimetres (0.060 in). Its cephalic region is modestly convex, and it has a procurved fovea. Its labium possesses no cuspules. A serrula is present. Its sternal sigilla is as in A. Centralis, and it has a lightly reborder sternum. Chelicerae: rastellum is formed by long and attenuate setae. Its cephalothorax, legs and palpi are a yellowish brown colour, while its abdomen is densely mottled and ventrally pallid, with some dark spots in front of spinnerets.

== Distribution ==
This species can be found in silk tubes under boulders of calcium carbonate, at the foot of the Río Paraná. It is only known from this location, in eastern Entre Ríos Province, Argentina.
