= Acanthogonatus quilocura =

Scientific classification
- Kingdom: Animalia
- Phylum: Arthropoda
- Subphylum: Chelicerata
- Class: Arachnida
- Order: Araneae
- Infraorder: Mygalomorphae
- Family: Pycnothelidae
- Genus: Acanthogonatus
- Species: A. quilocura

Binomial name
- Acanthogonatus quilocura Goloboff, 1995

Species of spider

Acanthogonatus quilocura is a mygalomorph spider of Chile, its name referring to the seemingly unending number of species within this genus (“locura” meaning madness in Spanish). Males are similar to those of A. tacuariensis (from Uruguay), from which are distinguished by a curved metatarsus I; female spermathecae are characteristic in having a strongly bent duct arising from the base of a blunt basal dome.

== Description ==
- Female: total length 29.6 millimetres (1.17 in); cephalothorax length 9.65 millimetres (0.380 in), width 7.45 millimetres (0.293 in); cephalic region length 6.2 millimetres (0.24 in), width 5.4 millimetres (0.21 in); fovea width 1 millimetre (0.039 in); medial ocular quadrangle (OQ) length 0.71 millimetres (0.028 in), width 1.4 millimetres (0.055 in); labium length 0.88 millimetres (0.035 in), width 1.5 millimetres (0.059 in); sternum length 4.9 millimetres (0.19 in), width 3.9 millimetres (0.15 in). Its cephalic region is convex, with its fovea slightly procurved, with a small posterior notch. Its labium possesses 3 cuspules. A well-developed serrula is present. Its sternal sigilla is small and oval, connected to the sternal margin by a depression; the sternum is slightly rebordered. Chelicerae: the rastellum is formed by thickened, attenuate setae. Spermathecae have their lateral duct strongly bent. Color as in male.
- Male: total length 19.6 millimetres (0.77 in); cephalothorax length 8.9 millimetres (0.35 in), width 7 millimetres (0.28 in), cephalic region length 5.5 millimetres (0.22 in), width 4.25 millimetres (0.167 in); OQ length 0.69 millimetres (0.027 in), width 1.28 millimetres (0.050 in); labium length 0.83 millimetres (0.033 in), width 1.35 millimetres (0.053 in); sternum length 4.45 millimetres (0.175 in), width 3.48 millimetres (0.137 in). Its labium possesses 1 cuspule. Its serrula is well developed. Its sternal sigilla is elongate, with an outer side depressed, forming a connection with the sternal margin, which is rebordered. Chelicerae: rastellum is absent. Cheliceral tumescence small and pallid, ventrally protruding. Leg I and its metatarsus are curved downwards. The entire spider is a golden brown colour, while its abdomen is yellowish golden-brown with darker brown spots.

== Distribution ==
This species appears to be restricted to Region Metropolitana. It has been collected from burrows similar to A. huaquen.
