= Acanthogonatus centralis =

Scientific classification
- Kingdom: Animalia
- Phylum: Arthropoda
- Subphylum: Chelicerata
- Class: Arachnida
- Order: Araneae
- Infraorder: Mygalomorphae
- Family: Pycnothelidae
- Genus: Acanthogonatus
- Species: A. centralis

Binomial name
- Acanthogonatus centralis Goloboff, 1995

Species of spider

Acanthogonatus centralis is a mygalomorph spider of Argentina, its name referring to its distribution, being one of the most common mygalomorphs in central Argentina. Females are most similar to those of A. parana, are distinguished by the widened fundus of the spermathecae. Males, on the other hand, are recognized by the smooth, keelless bulb, in combination with a well-developed tibial apophysis.

== Description ==
- Female: total length 15.02 millimetres (0.591 in); cephalothorax length 5.69 millimetres (0.224 in), width 4.14 millimetres (0.163 in); cephalic region length 3.84 millimetres (0.151 in), width 2.85 millimetres (0.112 in); fovea width 0.6 millimetres (0.024 in); medial ocular quadrangle (OQ) length 0.6 millimetres (0.024 in), width 1.11 millimetres (0.044 in); labium length 0.5 millimetres (0.020 in), width 1.09 millimetres (0.043 in); sternum length 2.75 millimetres (0.108 in), width 2.35 millimetres (0.093 in). Its cephalic region is convex, with the fovea slightly procurved. Its labium possesses no cuspules. A serrula is present, as is a small patch of teeth. Its sternal sigilla is oval, and the sternum weakly rebordered. Chelicerae: rastellum is formed by weak setae. The cephalothorax, legs and palpi are a yellowish brown, while the abdomen is densely mottled, ventrally pallid and has some dark spots in front of spinnerets.
- Male: total length 12.62 millimetres (0.497 in); cephalothorax length 5.57 millimetres (0.219 in), width 4.27 millimetres (0.168 in); cephalic region length 3.71 millimetres (0.146 in), width 2.54 millimetres (0.100 in); OQ length 0.61 millimetres (0.024 in), width 1.03 millimetres (0.041 in); labium length 0.5 millimetres (0.020 in), width 1.01 millimetres (0.040 in); sternum length 2.75 millimetres (0.108 in), width 2.2 millimetres (0.087 in). Its labium has 1 cuspule. A well-developed serrula is present, while a small and oval sternal sigilla exists and its sternum is weakly rebordered. Chelicerae: rastellum is absent; cheliceral tumescence is small with diffuse limits and a small ventral projection. Its metatarsus is straight, and its color is as in female.

== Distribution ==
It is a very common species in Sierras Centrales, Argentina (southern Buenos Aires Province, western Córdoba Province, San Luis Province and San Juan Province - Humid subtropical climate).

== Behaviour ==
A. centralis is found mostly in hilly areas of central Argentina. The species is easily found under stones, where they construct a dense silk tube (which usually also implies a short burrow). They occasionally were collected in burrows dug in the earth between stones; the burrows were closed with debris. Adult males are capable of constructing tunnel-webs, but they are quite different from those of juveniles and females, lacking the short burrow.

Male courtship involves scratching and beating the ground. After contacting female silk, males have been observed to stretch the web. Males manipulate their pedipalps and spasmodically beat their legs over the female. Females remain active during copulation by making body jerks and struggling.
