= Acanthogonatus huaquen =

Scientific classification
- Kingdom: Animalia
- Phylum: Arthropoda
- Subphylum: Chelicerata
- Class: Arachnida
- Order: Araneae
- Infraorder: Mygalomorphae
- Family: Pycnothelidae
- Genus: Acanthogonatus
- Species: A. huaquen

Binomial name
- Acanthogonatus huaquen Goloboff, 1995

Species of spider

Acanthogonatus huaquen is a mygalomorph spider of Chile, its name referring to its type locality: Huaquén, Chile. Males are recognized from other two-clawed Acanthogonatus by the bulb with a lateral keel delimiting a concave area; females by the spermathecae with an almost conical basal mound and its duct arising from its tip (similar spermathecae occur in A. franki).

== Description ==
- Female: total length 23.6 millimetres (0.93 in); cephalothorax length 9.21 millimetres (0.363 in), width 7.45 millimetres (0.293 in); cephalic region length 5.55 millimetres (0.219 in), width 5.5 millimetres (0.22 in); fovea width 0.93 millimetres (0.037 in); medial ocular quadrangle (OQ) length 0.82 millimetres (0.032 in), width 1.53 millimetres (0.060 in); labium length 1.01 millimetres (0.040 in), width 1.56 millimetres (0.061 in); sternum length 4.82 millimetres (0.190 in), width 3.83 millimetres (0.151 in). Its cephalic region is convex. Its labium possesses 2 cuspules. A well-developed serrula is present. Its sternal sigilla is submarginal and long, and its sternum is weakly rebordered. Chelicerae: rastellum formed by attenuate setae. It is coloured as the male.
- Male: total length 15.27 millimetres (0.601 in); cephalothorax length 6.87 millimetres (0.270 in), width 5.38 millimetres (0.212 in); cephalic region length 4.33 millimetres (0.170 in), width 3.09 millimetres (0.122 in); OQ length 0.59 millimetres (0.023 in), width 1.18 millimetres (0.046 in); labium length 0.67 millimetres (0.026 in), width 1.61 millimetres (0.063 in); sternum length 3.6 millimetres (0.14 in), width 2.74 millimetres (0.108 in). Its labium has 2 very small cuspules. A well-developed serrula is present. Its sternal sigilla is small, shallow and oval, and its sternum is strongly rebordered. Chelicerae: rastellum formed by weak setae. Cheliceral tumescence present and ventrally protruding. Its metatarsus is almost straight (slightly curved, with its prolateral side being concave). Cephalothorax and legs are a dark brown, while its abdomen is yellowish in colour and densely mottled, covered with dark hairs; its entire body is covered with a golden pubescence.

== Distribution ==
With A. campanae and A. pissii, A. huaquen is one of the most common spiders of the genus in central Chile (Regions IV and V). It has not been found in Region Metropolitana, where A. quilocura seems to replace it.

== Taxonomy and Behaviour ==
Goloboff (1995) states there may be more than one species included in his description study. Specimens from Quereo and Caleta Oscura were observed to have longer, spiraled spermathecal ducts; they may represent a different species. This species builds open burrows, lined with a dense layer of silk. The silk lining elongates to the burrow's entrance forming a sort of collar; the burrows are up to 2 centimetres (0.79 in) in diameter, and between 20 and 25 centimetres (7.9 and 9.8 in) deep. In forest ecosystems, the spider prefers more forested parts (not necessarily too moist); they are very common in the open grassland.
