= Acanthogonatus patagallina =

Scientific classification
- Kingdom: Animalia
- Phylum: Arthropoda
- Subphylum: Chelicerata
- Class: Arachnida
- Order: Araneae
- Infraorder: Mygalomorphae
- Family: Pycnothelidae
- Genus: Acanthogonatus
- Species: A. patagallina

Binomial name
- Acanthogonatus patagallina Goloboff, 1995

Species of spider

Acanthogonatus patagallina is a mygalomorph spider of Chile, named after its type locality: Pata de Gallina, Arauco, Region VIII (Bío Bío Region). This species is closest to A. nahuelbuta, but is distinguished by having the basal portion of the male's bulbal duct more sinuous and the basal portion of its bulb more rounded in lateral view.

== Description ==
- Male: total length 10.5 millimetres (0.41 in); cephalothorax length 4.37 millimetres (0.172 in), width 3.42 millimetres (0.135 in); cephalic region length 2.87 millimetres (0.113 in), width 1.91 millimetres (0.075 in); medial ocular quadrangle (OQ) length 0.42 millimetres (0.017 in), width 0.8 millimetres (0.031 in); labium length 0.30 millimetres (0.012 in), width 0.73 millimetres (0.029 in); sternum length 2.21 millimetres (0.087 in), width 1.82 millimetres (0.072 in). Its labium possesses no cuspules; its maxillae have 15 attenuate setae. A well-developed serrula is present. Its sternal sigilla is small, almost rounded and shallow. Chelicerae: rastellum is absent. Cheliceral tumescence is small and ventrally produced. Leg I and its tibial apophysis is similar to that of A. Nahuelbuta, while its metatarsus is straight. Its cephalothorax and legs are a reddish-brown colour, with yellowish lighter glabrous leg stripes. Its sternum is yellowish, and its dorsal abdomen is densely mottled.

== Distribution ==
Only in its type locality.
