= Laguna El Juncal =

Lagoon and archaeological site in Argentina

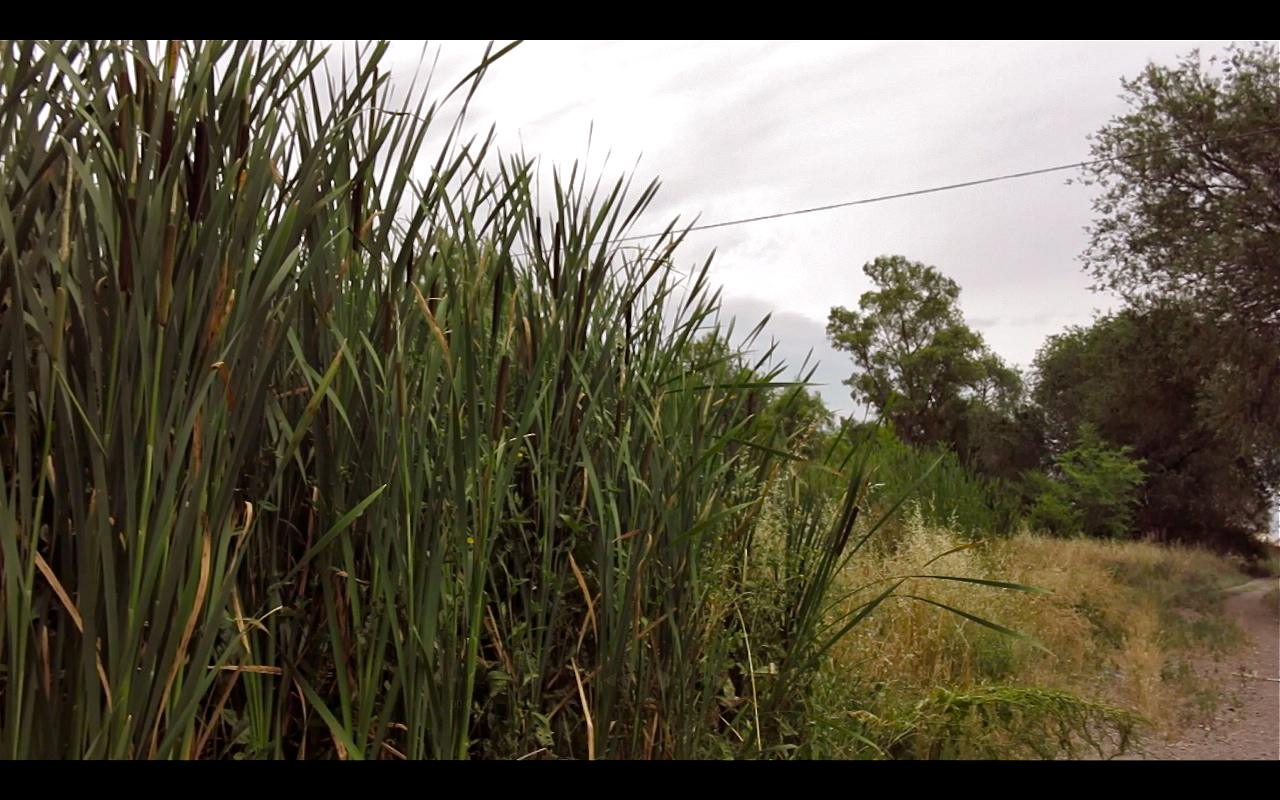

Location
- Country: Argentina
- State: Río Negro
- Region: Patagonia
- City: Viedma

Laguna El Juncal (English: The Juncal Lagoon) was an important body of water located near the city of Viedma, Argentina. It covered an approximate area of 60 km (37 mi) long and 4 km (2.5 mi) wide, running parallel to Río Negro with a separation of between 6 and 7 km (3.7 and 4.3 mi). Being a supply of animal and vegetable food in the Patagonian plateau, it was highly populated by different communities. The vestiges of those communities are important archaeological sites that have been studied by many researchers since the 19th century.

== History ==
After a severe flood in 1899 causing havoc in Viedma and surrounding areas, a series of evaluations were carried out to control the course of the river and the overflow of water from the lagoon.

During the 1930s, the lagoon was drained in order to prevent groundwater floods and river floods in the area, to improve the road links between neighboring towns, and to use the land for agricultural production.

== Settlements ==
For the last 3,000 years, people have settled in the shores of the lagoon. The vestiges of those settlements captured the first naturalists' attention who went on expeditions to the region during the 19th century. The abundant human remains (cemeteries) account for the exploitation of the lagoon by different communities.

After the lagoon was drained, while the land was being prepared for crop production, many human burials were discovered. In 1970, a team led by Rodolfo Casamiquela made plaster casts out of skeletons. A replica of those skeletons was made in order to be exhibited in different local museums of Río Negro Province, meeting the museological standards of that time. One of them was sent to Museo Provincial Carlos Ameghino in Cipolletti, and it was later lent to Museo Estación Cultural, in Fernández Oro.
