= List of Pycnothelidae species =

This page lists all described genera and species of the spider family Pycnothelidae. As of June 2020, the World Spider Catalog accepts 97 species in 6 genera:

== A ==
=== Acanthogonatus ===
Acanthogonatus
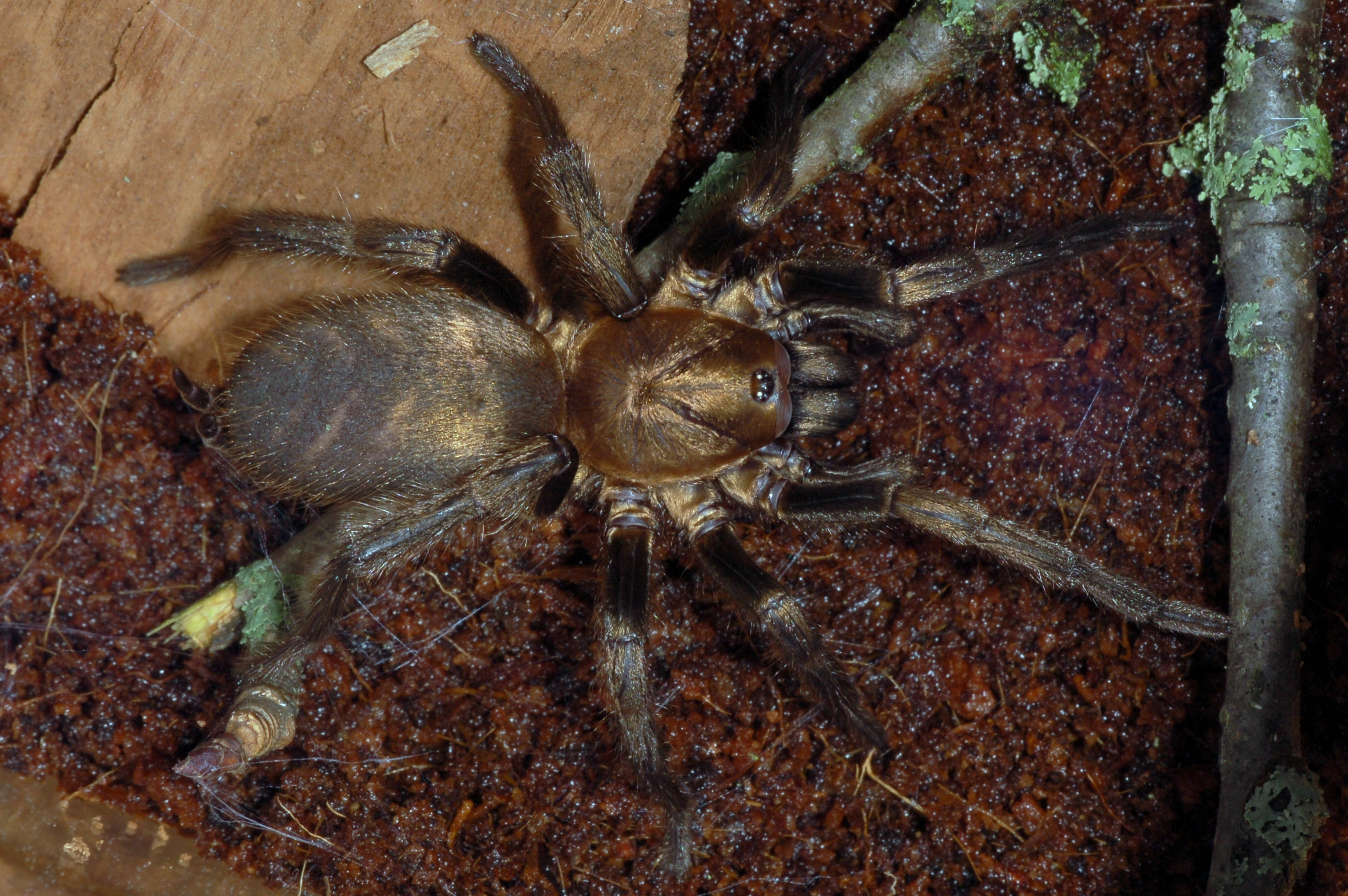

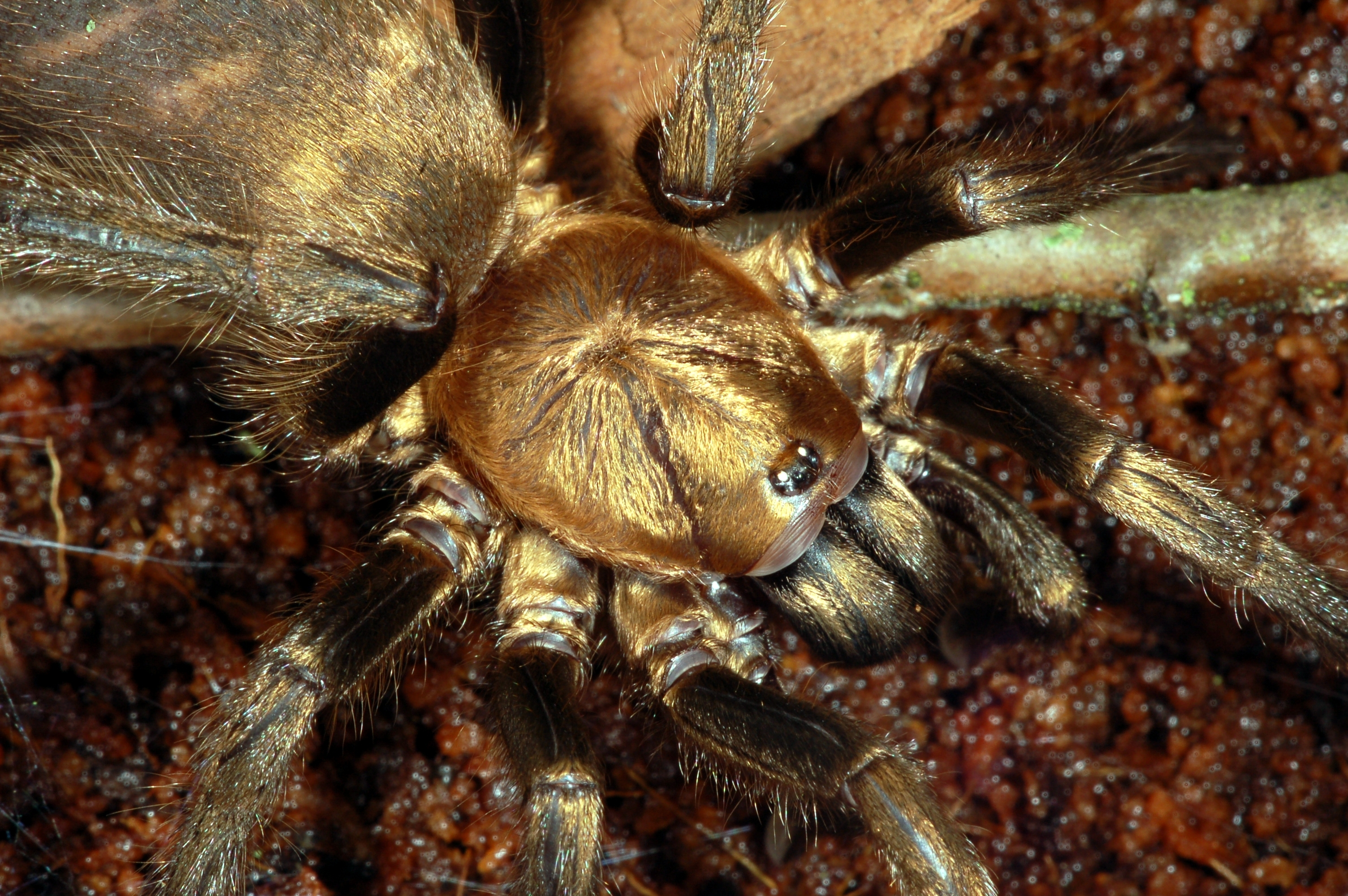
Acanthogonatus francki

Acanthogonatus Karsch, 1880

- Acanthogonatus alegre Goloboff, 1995 — Chile
- Acanthogonatus birabeni Goloboff, 1995 — Argentina
- Acanthogonatus brunneus (Nicolet, 1849) — Chile
- Acanthogonatus campanae (Legendre & Calderón, 1984) — Chile
- Acanthogonatus centralis Goloboff, 1995 — Argentina
- Acanthogonatus chilechico Goloboff, 1995 — Chile
- Acanthogonatus confusus Goloboff, 1995 — Chile, Argentina
- Acanthogonatus ericae Indicatti, Lucas, Ott & Brescovit, 2008 — Brazil
- Acanthogonatus francki Karsch, 1880 (type) — Chile
- Acanthogonatus fuegianus (Simon, 1902) — Chile, Argentina
- Acanthogonatus hualpen Goloboff, 1995 — Chile
- Acanthogonatus huaquen Goloboff, 1995 — Chile
- Acanthogonatus incursus (Chamberlin, 1916) — Peru
- Acanthogonatus juncal Goloboff, 1995 — Chile
- Acanthogonatus minimus Indicatti, Folly-Ramos, Vargas, Lucas & Brescovit, 2015 — Brazil
- Acanthogonatus mulchen Goloboff, 1995 — Chile
- Acanthogonatus nahuelbuta Goloboff, 1995 — Chile
- Acanthogonatus notatus (Mello-Leitão, 1940) — Argentina
- Acanthogonatus parana Goloboff, 1995 — Argentina
- Acanthogonatus patagallina Goloboff, 1995 — Chile
- Acanthogonatus patagonicus (Simon, 1905) — Chile, Argentina
- Acanthogonatus peniasco Goloboff, 1995 — Chile
- Acanthogonatus pissii (Simon, 1889) — Chile
- Acanthogonatus quilocura Goloboff, 1995 — Chile
- Acanthogonatus recinto Goloboff, 1995 — Chile
- Acanthogonatus subcalpeianus (Nicolet, 1849) — Chile
- Acanthogonatus tacuariensis (Pérez-Miles & Capocasale, 1982) — Brazil, Uruguay
- Acanthogonatus tolhuaca Goloboff, 1995 — Chile
- Acanthogonatus vilches Goloboff, 1995 — Chile

== B ==
=== Bayana ===
Bayana Pérez-Miles, Costa & Montes de Oca, 2014

- Bayana labordai Pérez-Miles, Costa & Montes de Oca, 2014 (type) — Brazil, Uruguay

== S ==
=== Stanwellia ===
Use this template to add pictures

Stanwellia

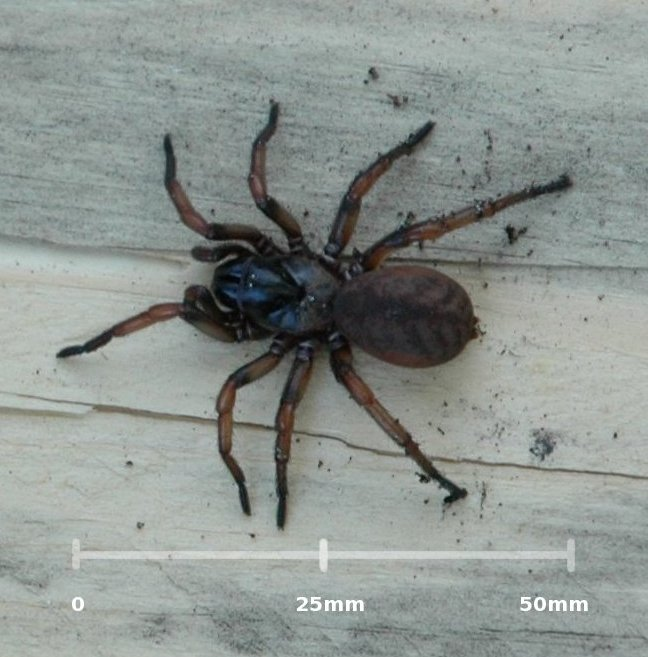
Melbourne Trapdoor Spider
(Stanwellia grisea)

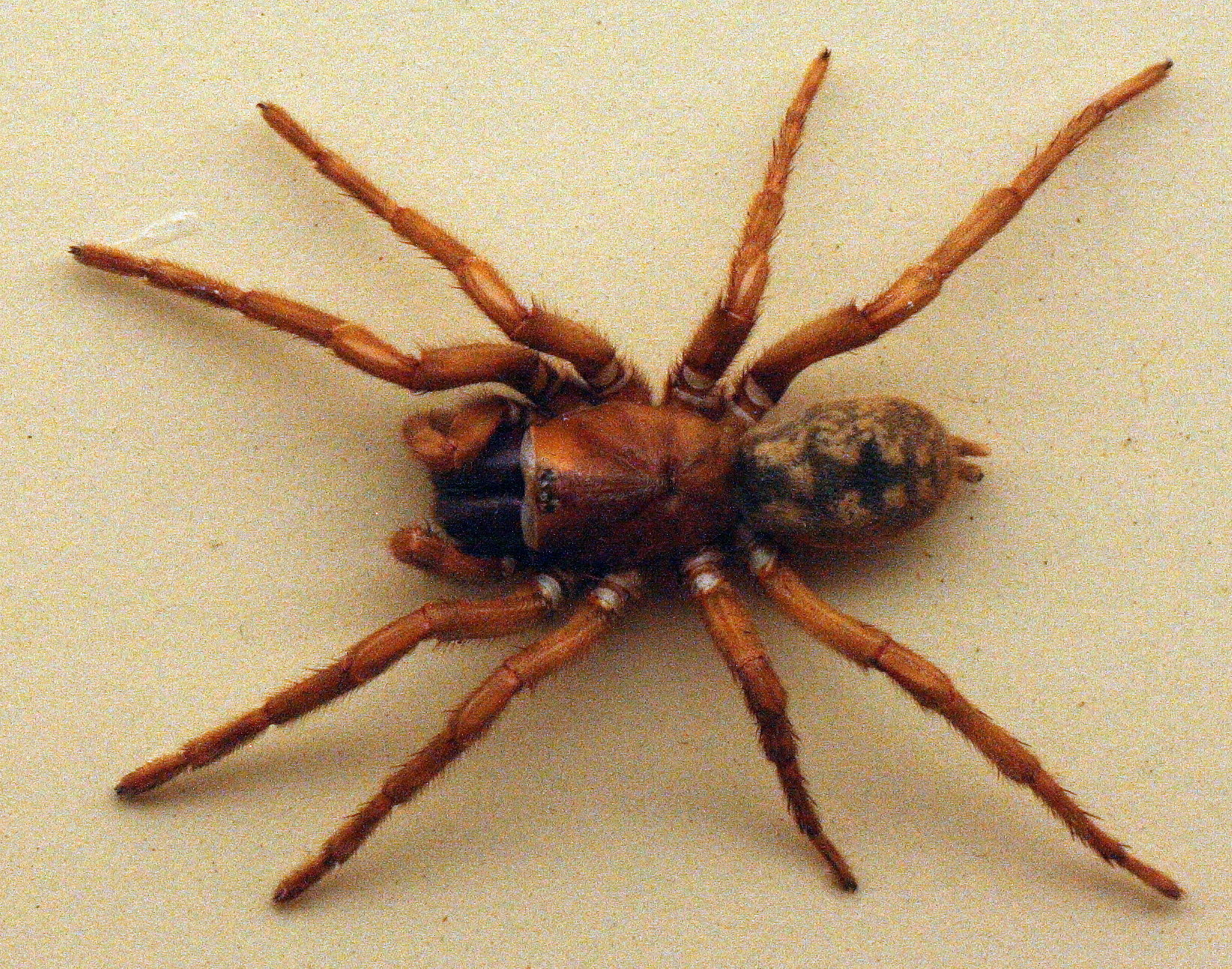
Stanwellia hoggi

Stanwellia Rainbow & Pulleine, 1918

- Stanwellia annulipes (C. L. Koch, 1841) — Australia (Tasmania)
- Stanwellia bipectinata (Todd, 1945) — New Zealand
- Stanwellia grisea (Hogg, 1901) — Australia (Victoria)
- Stanwellia hapua (Forster, 1968) — New Zealand
- Stanwellia hoggi (Rainbow, 1914) (type) — Australia (New South Wales)
- Stanwellia hollowayi (Forster, 1968) — New Zealand
- Stanwellia houhora (Forster, 1968) — New Zealand
- Stanwellia inornata Main, 1972 — Australia (Victoria)
- Stanwellia kaituna (Forster, 1968) — New Zealand
- Stanwellia media (Forster, 1968) — New Zealand
- Stanwellia minor (Kulczyński, 1908) — Australia (New South Wales)
- Stanwellia nebulosa (Rainbow & Pulleine, 1918) — Australia (South Australia)
- Stanwellia occidentalis Main, 1972 — Australia (South Australia)
- Stanwellia pexa (Hickman, 1930) — Australia (Tasmania)
- Stanwellia puna (Forster, 1968) — New Zealand
- Stanwellia regia (Forster, 1968) — New Zealand
- Stanwellia taranga (Forster, 1968) — New Zealand
- Stanwellia tuna (Forster, 1968) — New Zealand

=== Stenoterommata ===
Stenoterommata Holmberg, 1881

- Stenoterommata arnolisei Indicatti, Lucas, Ott & Brescovit, 2008 – Brazil
- Stenoterommata bodoquena Ghirotto & Indicatti, 2021 – Brazil
- Stenoterommata chavarii Ghirotto & Indicatti, 2021 – Brazil
- Stenoterommata crassimana (Mello-Leitão, 1923) – Brazil
- Stenoterommata crassistyla Goloboff, 1995 – Uruguay, Argentina
- Stenoterommata curiy Indicatti, Lucas, Ott & Brescovit, 2008 – Brazil
- Stenoterommata egric Ghirotto & Indicatti, 2021 – Brazil
- Stenoterommata grimpa Indicatti, Lucas, Ott & Brescovit, 2008 – Brazil
- Stenoterommata gugai Indicatti, Chavari, Zucatelli-Júnior, Lucas & Brescovit, 2017 – Brazil
- Stenoterommata iguazu Goloboff, 1995 – Argentina
- Stenoterommata isa (Nicoletta, Panchuk, Peralta-Seen & Ferretti, 2022) – Argentina
- Stenoterommata leporina (Simon, 1891) – Brazil
- Stenoterommata leticiae Indicatti, Chavari, Zucatelli-Júnior, Lucas & Brescovit, 2017 – Brazil
- Stenoterommata luederwaldti (Mello-Leitão, 1923) – Brazil
- Stenoterommata maculata (Bertkau, 1880) – Brazil
- Stenoterommata melloleitaoi Guadanucci & Indicatti, 2004 – Brazil
- Stenoterommata neodiplornata Ghirotto & Indicatti, 2021 – Brazil
- Stenoterommata palmar Goloboff, 1995 – Brazil, Argentina
- Stenoterommata pavesii Indicatti, Chavari, Zucatelli-Júnior, Lucas & Brescovit, 2017 – Brazil
- Stenoterommata peri Indicatti, Chavari, Zucatelli-Júnior, Lucas & Brescovit, 2017 – Brazil
- Stenoterommata pescador Indicatti, Chavari, Zucatelli-Júnior, Lucas & Brescovit, 2017 – Brazil
- Stenoterommata platensis Holmberg, 1881 (type) – Argentina
- Stenoterommata quena Goloboff, 1995 – Argentina
- Stenoterommata sevegnaniae Indicatti, Chavari, Zucatelli-Júnior, Lucas & Brescovit, 2017 – Brazil
- Stenoterommata tenuistyla Goloboff, 1995 – Argentina
- Stenoterommata uruguai Goloboff, 1995 – Argentina
