= Stenoterommata uruguai =

Scientific classification
- Kingdom: Animalia
- Phylum: Arthropoda
- Subphylum: Chelicerata
- Class: Arachnida
- Order: Araneae
- Infraorder: Mygalomorphae
- Family: Pycnothelidae
- Genus: Stenoterommata
- Species: S. uruguai

Binomial name
- Stenoterommata uruguai Goloboff, 1995

Species of spider

Stenoterommata uruguai is a mygalomorph spider of Argentina, named after its type locality: Salto del Uruguaí. This species is distinguished from other Stenoterommata (having anterior tarsi with reduced inferior tarsal claws) by its spermathecae consisting of a single dome bearing numerous receptacula. Its spermathecae are similar to those of S. quena, but in S. uruguai the basal dome is more rounded.

== Description ==
- Female: total length 17.7 millimetres (0.70 in); cephalothorax length 7.1 mm (0.28 in), width 5 mm (0.20 in); cephalic region length 4.35 mm (0.171 in), width 3.85 mm (0.152 in); fovea width 0.91 mm (0.036 in); labium length 0.67 mm (0.026 in), width 1.22 mm (0.048 in); sternum length 3.47 mm (0.137 in), width 3 mm (0.12 in). Its cephalic region is convex with its fovea procurved. Its Labium has no cuspules and serrula are absent. Their sternal sigilla is very shallow and in most specimens (not always) smaller and more widely separated from the margin than in other species of the genus (particularly the sympatric S. iguazu. Chelicerae: rastellum weak, only thin, attenuate setae; cephalothorax, legs and palpi are reddish brown, with golden hairs; abdomen yellowish brown, with darker mottles.

== Distribution ==
Misiones Province, Argentina.

== See also ==
- Spider anatomy
- Iguazú National Park
