= Lycinus frayjorge =

Scientific classification
- Kingdom: Animalia
- Phylum: Arthropoda
- Subphylum: Chelicerata
- Class: Arachnida
- Order: Araneae
- Infraorder: Mygalomorphae
- Family: Pycnothelidae
- Genus: Lycinus
- Species: L. frayjorge

Binomial name
- Lycinus frayjorge Goloboff, 1995

Species of spider

Lycinus frayjorge is a mygalomorph spider of Chile, named after its type locality: Parque Nacional Fray Jorge, Limarí, Region IV (Coquimbo). The female spermathecae are most similar to those of L. gajardoi, which differs by the less numerous maxillary cuspules, the lighter scopula IV, and the presence of pseudopreening combs.

== Description ==
- Female: total length 24.9 millimetres (0.98 in); cephalothorax length 9.9 millimetres (0.39 in), width 8.8 millimetres (0.35 in); cephalic region length 6.55 millimetres (0.258 in), width 6.6 millimetres (0.26 in); fovea width 1.4 millimetres (0.055 in); medial ocular quadrangle length 0.84 millimetres (0.033 in), width 1.35 millimetres (0.053 in); labium length 1.05 millimetres (0.041 in), width 1.95 millimetres (0.077 in); sternum length 5.6 millimetres (0.22 in), width 4.5 millimetres (0.18 in). Its cephalic region is short, wide and convex. Its labium possesses 1 cuspule. A serrula is absent and its sternum is reborded. Chelicerae: rastellum is formed by numerous small, short and blunt cusps. Its cephalothorax is yellowish-brown, with dark striae, while its legs are a uniformly yellowish-brown colour and the dorsal abdomen is dark-brown, with a chevron as in L. epipiptus, but almost hidden by a dark pubescence and pigmentation.

== Distribution and Behaviour ==
Only from its type locality, Region IV (Coquimbo Region). They are found in a habitat similar to that described for Chaco socos, at the side of a ravine, from burrows closed with the typical double flap.

== See also ==
- Spider anatomy
- Regions of Chile
