= Lycinus quilicura =

Scientific classification
- Kingdom: Animalia
- Phylum: Arthropoda
- Subphylum: Chelicerata
- Class: Arachnida
- Order: Araneae
- Infraorder: Mygalomorphae
- Family: Pycnothelidae
- Genus: Lycinus
- Species: L. quilicura

Binomial name
- Lycinus quilicura Goloboff, 1995

Species of spider

Lycinus quilicura is a mygalomorph spider of Chile, named after its type locality: Quilicura, Región Metropolitana. The species is distinguished from others in the genus by its distinctly long embolus.

== Description ==
- Male: total length 21.2 millimetres (0.83 in); cephalothorax length 9.7 millimetres (0.38 in), width 8.3 millimetres (0.33 in); cephalic region length 5.5 millimetres (0.22 in), width 5.2 millimetres (0.20 in); medial ocular quadrangle length 0.75 millimetres (0.030 in), width 1.41 millimetres (0.056 in); labium length 0.9 millimetres (0.035 in), width 1.6 millimetres (0.063 in); sternum length 5 millimetres (0.20 in), width 4.05 millimetres (0.159 in). Its labium and maxillae lack cuspules. A serrula is absent or quite reduced. Chelicerae: rastellum is weak, formed by long and stiff bristles; its fang furrow possesses 12 medium-sized denticles. Cheliceral tumescence is rounded and flat. Its leg I and tibia are unmodified and lack an apophysis, while its metatarsus is straight. The entire spider is blackish brown and densely covered with a golden-brown pubescence; chevron (similar to L. gajardoi and other Chilean species of its genus) almost completely occluded by a very dark color and pubescence.

== Distribution and Behaviour ==
Only from its type locality, Región Metropolitana.

== See also ==
- Spider anatomy
- Regions of Chile
