= Lycinus tofo =

Scientific classification
- Kingdom: Animalia
- Phylum: Arthropoda
- Subphylum: Chelicerata
- Class: Arachnida
- Order: Araneae
- Infraorder: Mygalomorphae
- Family: Pycnothelidae
- Genus: Lycinus
- Species: L. tofo

Binomial name
- Lycinus tofo Goloboff, 1995

Species of spider

Lycinus tofo is a mygalomorph spider of Chile, named after its type locality: El Tofo, Coquimbo Region. Males are distinguished by the palpal bulb, more abruptly tapered than in other species of the genus; females by the long, slender, spiraled spermathecal receptacula.

== Description ==
- Male: total length 24 millimetres (0.94 in); cephalothorax length 10.39 millimetres (0.409 in), width 8.44 millimetres (0.332 in); its cephalic region is wide and short, its width 0.61 of the thoracic width. Its fovea is narrow, occupying 0.08 of the cephalothorax width. Its labium length is 0.50 of width, while its sternum width is 0.79 of length. The labium possesses no cuspules. The cephalothorax, legs and palpi are a yellowish brown, the abdomen with a dark chevron.
- Female: total length 24.3 millimetres (0.96 in); cephalothorax length 8.1 millimetres (0.32 in), width 6.55 millimetres (0.258 in); cephalic region length 5.2 millimetres (0.20 in), width 5.2 millimetres (0.20 in); fovea width 0.87 millimetres (0.034 in); medial ocular quadrangle length 0.71 millimetres (0.028 in), width 1.32 millimetres (0.052 in); labium length 0.82 millimetres (0.032 in), width 1.57 millimetres (0.062 in); sternum length 4.45 millimetres (0.175 in), width 3.45 millimetres (0.136 in). Its cephalic region is short, wide and very convex, while its fovea is slightly procurved with recurved ends. Its labium possesses no cuspules. A serrula is absent. The sternal sigilla I is small and almost circular; II is oval; posterior sigilla is shallow, twice as long as wide. The sternum is weakly rebordered. Chelicerae: rastellum is formed by strong blunt setae (similar to L. longipes, but the setae are slightly longer and thicker). Its cephalothorax, legs and palpi are blackish-reddish brown, while its abdomen is gray, with darker parallel lines.

== Distribution and Behaviour ==
Southern Region III and northern Region IV, in burrows with double flaps.

== See also ==
- Spider anatomy
- Regions of Chile
