= Chaco sanjuanina =

Scientific classification
- Kingdom: Animalia
- Phylum: Arthropoda
- Subphylum: Chelicerata
- Class: Arachnida
- Order: Araneae
- Infraorder: Mygalomorphae
- Family: Pycnothelidae
- Genus: Chaco
- Species: C. sanjuanina

Binomial name
- Chaco sanjuanina Goloboff, 1995

Species of spider

Chaco sanjuanina is a species of mygalomorph spiders of Argentina, named after its type locality: San Agustin, Valle Fertil, San Juan, Argentina. Males can be distinguished from those of its cogenerates by the more conical bulb; females differ from C. tecka in having fewer spines on the metatarsus IV, and from C. patagonica in having labial cuspules arranged in a transverse row and the more numerous maxillary ones.

== Description ==
The male has a total length of 7.95 millimetres (0.313 in), a cephalothorax length of 3.34 millimetres (0.131 in) and width of 2.66 millimetres (0.105 in), a cephalic region length of 1.92 millimetres (0.076 in) and width of 1.55 millimetres (0.061 in); an ocular quadrangle (OQ) length of 0.34 millimetres (0.013 in) and width of 0.69 millimetres (0.027 in); a labium length of 0.25 millimetres (0.0098 in) and width of 0.59 millimetres (0.023 in); and a sternum length of 1.86 millimetres (0.073 in) and width of 1.37 millimetres (0.054 in). The labium possesses seven cuspules. The serrula is non-visible. The sternal sigilla is small, oval, and shallow, while its sternum is not rebordered. Its colour is faded, a uniform yellow, its caput being darker; the abdomen has a light chevron.

The female has a total length of 17.41 millimetres (0.685 in); a cephalothorax length of 3.23 millimetres (0.127 in) and width of 2.47 millimetres (0.097 in); a cephalic region length of 1.98 millimetres (0.078 in) and width of 1.95 millimetres (0.077 in); a fovea width of 0.37 millimetres (0.015 in); an OQ length of 0.39 millimetres (0.015 in) and width of 0.77 millimetres (0.030 in); a labium length of 0.30 millimetres (0.012 in) and width of 0.67 millimetres (0.026 in); and a sternum length of 1.98 millimetres (0.078 in) and width of 1.40 millimetres (0.055 in). Its cephalic region is strongly convex, the fovea is sinuous and straight. Its labium has eight cuspules. The sternal sigilla is small and oval; the sternum is quite convex, not rebordered. The colour is the same as in the male.

== See also ==
- Spider anatomy
