= Stenoterommata palmar =

Scientific classification
- Kingdom: Animalia
- Phylum: Arthropoda
- Subphylum: Chelicerata
- Class: Arachnida
- Order: Araneae
- Infraorder: Mygalomorphae
- Family: Pycnothelidae
- Genus: Stenoterommata
- Species: S. palmar

Binomial name
- Stenoterommata palmar Goloboff, 1995

Species of spider

Stenoterommata palmar is a mygalomorph spider of Argentina, named after its type locality: Parque Nacional El Palmar, Entre Rios. Females differ from other three-clawed Stenoterommata in the spermathecae having one triangular dome with a single receptaculum arising from its base; males are most similar to those of S. tenuistyla, but lack short ventral spines on the metatarsus I (typical of that species), and have a long, curved spine on the apical third of their ventral tibia I. Its burrowing behaviour is similar to that of S. tenuistyla.

== Description ==
- Female: total length 15.05 millimetres (0.593 in); cephalothorax length 5.95 millimetres (0.234 in), width 4.6 millimetres (0.18 in); cephalic region length 0.38 millimetres (0.015 in), width 3.25 millimetres (0.128 in); fovea width 0.67 millimetres (0.026 in); labium length 0.52 millimetres (0.020 in), width 1.06 millimetres (0.042 in); sternum length 3.2 millimetres (0.13 in), width 2.62 millimetres (0.103 in). Its cephalic region is convex, with its fovea slightly procurved. Its labium possesses 1 cuspule, and has no serrula. Its sternum is reborded and with small, marginal and oval sternal sigilla (similar to S. tenuistyla). Chelicerae: rastellum formed by attenuate setae. Color as in the male.
- Male: total length 8.75 millimetres (0.344 in); cephalothorax length 4.05 millimetres (0.159 in), width 2.9 millimetres (0.11 in); cephalic region length 2.57 millimetres (0.101 in), width 1.57 millimetres (0.062 in); sternum length 2.15 millimetres (0.085 in), width 1.70 millimetres (0.067 in). Its labium has no cuspules, with serrula purportedly absent. Its sternal sigilla is small and shallow, its sternum rebordered. Chelicerae: rastellum is weak, with thin attenuate setae; cheliceral tumescence present, with thickened hairs on its postero-inferior corner. Cephalothorax, legs, palpi reddish brown, with golden hairs; abdomen is yellowish brown in colour, with darker mottles.

== Distribution ==
Eastern Entre Rios and Corrientes Province; southern Brazil.

== See also ==
- Spider anatomy
