= Lycinus domeyko =

Scientific classification
- Kingdom: Animalia
- Phylum: Arthropoda
- Subphylum: Chelicerata
- Class: Arachnida
- Order: Araneae
- Infraorder: Mygalomorphae
- Family: Pycnothelidae
- Genus: Lycinus
- Species: L. domeyko

Binomial name
- Lycinus domeyko Goloboff, 1995

Species of spider

Lycinus domeyko is a mygalomorph spider of Chile, named after its type locality: Domeyko, Huasco, Region III (Atacama Region). It is the smallest species in the genus. Its size, the size of the bulb, its short embolus and the cymbial setae directed toward the apex distinguish this species from all other Lycinus.

== Description ==
- Male: total length 11.5 millimetres (0.45 in); cephalothorax length 5.25 millimetres (0.207 in), width 4.25 millimetres (0.167 in); cephalic region length 3 millimetres (0.12 in), width 2.6 millimetres (0.10 in); medial ocular quadrangle length 0.44 millimetres (0.017 in), width 0.8 millimetres (0.031 in); labium length 0.5 millimetres (0.020 in), width 0.85 millimetres (0.033 in); sternum length 2.63 millimetres (0.104 in), width 2.25 millimetres (0.089 in). The labium possesses no cuspules. Its sternal sigilla is small, oval and shallow, while its sternum is rebordered. Chelicerae: rastellum is weak, its fang furrow carries about 10 medium-sized denticles. The cheliceral tumescence is rounded and flat. Cephalothorax, legs and palpi are a yellowish-orangish brown colour, while the abdomen with chevron is formed by 6 recurved lines becoming gradually smaller towards the posterior end.

== Distribution and Behaviour ==
Known only from its type locality in Chile.

== See also ==
- Spider anatomy
- Regions of Chile
