= Chaco tucumana =

Scientific classification
- Kingdom: Animalia
- Phylum: Arthropoda
- Subphylum: Chelicerata
- Class: Arachnida
- Order: Araneae
- Infraorder: Mygalomorphae
- Family: Pycnothelidae
- Genus: Chaco
- Species: C. tucumana

Binomial name
- Chaco tucumana Goloboff, 1995

Species of spider

Chaco tucumana is a species of mygalomorph spiders of Argentina, named after its type locality: Tucumán. This species differs from C. obscura in the shorter male embolus and the shorter female spermathecal ducts. From other species of the genus it differs in its dark uniform color, the flexible anterior female tarsi, the denser scopulae on the posterior tarsi, and the female spermathecae without a basal protuberance. As in C. obscura, smaller specimens are much lighter in color, and it has darker spots that are evident on the sides of its cephalic region, the apex of femora, base of the patellae and lateral tibiae and dorsal abdomen. Larger specimens are much darker, almost black, with no visible pattern.

== Description ==
The male has a total length of 14.6 millimetres (0.57 in); a cephalothorax length of 6.2 millimetres (0.24 in) and width of 5.4 millimetres (0.21 in); a cephalic region length of 3.75 millimetres (0.148 in) and width of 3.25 millimetres (0.128 in); a medial ocular quadrangle (OQ) length of 0.56 millimetres (0.022 in) and width of 1.02 millimetres (0.040 in); a labium length of 0.5 millimetres (0.020 in) and width of 1.05 millimetres (0.041 in); and a sternum length of 3.15 millimetres (0.124 in) and width of 2.45 millimetres (0.096 in). The labium possesses one cuspule. A serrula is present. The sternal sigilla is medium-sized, oval, and submarginal. Chelicerae: the rastellum is as in the female; the inner margin has seven teeth. The cheliceral tumescence is flat, covered with thin setae on its inferior half. The cephalothorax, legs, and palpi are blackish-brown; the abdomen is brown with light-brown spots.

The female has a total length of 17.6 millimetres (0.69 in); a cephalothorax length of 6.7 millimetres (0.26 in) and width of 5.2 millimetres (0.20 in); a cephalic region length of 4.2 millimetres (0.17 in) and width of 3.75 millimetres (0.148 in); fovea width 0.82 millimetres (0.032 in); an OQ length 0.6 millimetres (0.024 in) and width of 1.11 millimetres (0.044 in); a labium length of 0.57 millimetres (0.022 in) and width of 1.32 millimetres (0.052 in); and a sternum length of 3.55 millimetres (0.140 in) and width of 2.72 millimetres (0.107 in). Its cephalic region is convex, while the fovea is slightly procurved, almost straight. The labium has two cuspules. A serrula is absent. The sternal sigilla is small, submarginal, and of medium depth; the sternum is rebordered. The rastellum is as in C. obscura. The colour is the same as in the male.

== Distribution and behaviour ==
The animals construct burrows with a door, or sometimes two. The door normally is about 2 centimetres (0.79 in) in diameter. The burrow has smooth, well-cemented and compacted walls, with a thin (soil-colored) layer of compact silk; it is only 10 centimetres (3.9 in) to 15 centimetres (5.9 in), with a diameter of about 15 millimetres (0.59 in).

Most of the specimens were collected at the foot of almost vertical banks or the foot of large trees in Tucuman and Catamarca. Juveniles found elsewhere might extend this apparent habitat distribution.

== See also ==
- Spider anatomy
