= Chaco tecka =

Scientific classification
- Kingdom: Animalia
- Phylum: Arthropoda
- Subphylum: Chelicerata
- Class: Arachnida
- Order: Araneae
- Infraorder: Mygalomorphae
- Family: Pycnothelidae
- Genus: Chaco
- Species: C. tecka

Binomial name
- Chaco tecka Goloboff, 1995

Species of spider

Chaco tecka is a species of mygalomorph spiders of Argentina, named after its type locality: Rio Tecka, Chubut, Argentina. Females can be distinguished from those of other species of Chaco by the strong and numerous spines on metatarsus IV and by the presence of pseudopreening combs on metatarsi III and IV. From C. patagonica and C. sanjuanina, females differ also in the patterned cephalothorax and legs.

== Description ==
The female has a total length of 8.4 millimetres (0.33 in); a cephalothorax length of 3.02 millimetres (0.119 in) and width of 2.55 millimetres (0.100 in); a cephalic region length of 1.87 millimetres (0.074 in) and width of 1.85 millimetres (0.073 in); a fovea width of 0.37 millimetres (0.015 in); an OQ length of 0.34 millimetres (0.013 in) and width of 0.61 millimetres (0.024 in); a labium length of 0.29 millimetres (0.011 in) and width of 0.67 millimetres (0.026 in); and a sternum length of 1.71 millimetres (0.067 in) and width of 1.42 millimetres (0.056 in). Its cephalic region is convex; the fovea is slightly procurved. The labium possesses no cuspules. A serrula is absent; the sternal sigilla is small and shallow; the sternum is rebordered. Its cephalothorax is yellowish brown; the legs are of the same colour, but lighter; it carries darker spots on its cephalic region, on the retrolateral apex of the femora, the middle of the patellae, and the base of the tibiae.

== See also ==
- Spider anatomy
