= Chaco patagonica =

Scientific classification
- Kingdom: Animalia
- Phylum: Arthropoda
- Subphylum: Chelicerata
- Class: Arachnida
- Order: Araneae
- Infraorder: Mygalomorphae
- Family: Pycnothelidae
- Genus: Chaco
- Species: C. patagonica

Binomial name
- Chaco patagonica Goloboff, 1995

Species of spider

Chaco patagonica is a species of mygalomorph spiders of Argentina, named after its type locality in Patagonia, specifically Chubut Province, Argentina. The species can be distinguished from C. tecka by not having a patterned cephalothorax and legs, by possessing less maxillary cuspules and by the absence of false preening combs. It also differs from C. sanjuanina by having few labial cuspules.

== Description ==
The female of the species has a total length of 8.65 millimetres (0.341 in); a cephalothorax length of 3.1 millimetres (0.12 in), and a width of 2.43 millimetres (0.096 in). Its labium length is 45% of its width; its sternum width is 66% of the length. Its labium possesses two cuspules, while the maxillae has six cuspules. A serrula is absent. Its cephalothorax is yellowish, with brown mottles on its caput and posterior part of its thorax; the abdomen is yellowish with mottles. Pubescence is very light.

== Behaviour and distribution ==
The spiders of this species make a small burrow closed with a thin, flaplike door. The door is made from the silk layer lining the interior of the burrow, covered by grains of sand. As the spiders dig their burrow on inclined places (about 45 degrees), the sand falls over it when the flap is closed, covering the burrow fully. The burrows are about 5 millimetres (0.20 in) in diameter, and 10 centimetres (3.9 in) deep; its walls consist of a silk tube which prevents the sand from collapsing. It has only been found at its type locality.

== See also ==
- Spider anatomy
