= Chaco tigre =

Scientific classification
- Kingdom: Animalia
- Phylum: Arthropoda
- Subphylum: Chelicerata
- Class: Arachnida
- Order: Araneae
- Infraorder: Mygalomorphae
- Family: Pycnothelidae
- Genus: Chaco
- Species: C. tigre

Binomial name
- Chaco tigre Goloboff, 1995

Species of spider

Chaco tigre is a species of mygalomorph spiders of Chile, named after its type locality: Quebrada El Tigre, Petorca, Region V (Valparaíso Region). This species differs from C. socos by its spermathecae having a shorter duct and a more globose fundus, and by constructing a thin door for its burrow; the general colouration is brownish, while C. socos is more grayish coloured.

== Description ==
The male has a total length of 11.97 millimetres (0.471 in); and a cephalothorax length of 4.67 millimetres (0.184 in) and width of 3.65 millimetres (0.144 in). The labium length is 82% of its width. The sternum width is 82% of its length. The labium possesses six small cuspules. Its posterior sternal sigilla is well marked. Its cephalothorax and legs are yellowish brown, while the legs carry darker spots; the abdomen is lighter, with some brown coloring.

The female has a total length of 14.43 millimetres (0.568 in); a cephalothorax length of 8.1 millimetres (0.32 in) and width of 6.55 millimetres (0.258 in); and a cephalic region length of 5.03 millimetres (0.198 in) and width of 3.93 millimetres (0.155 in). The cephalic region's width is 77% of the cephalothorax's width. The labium length is 52% of its width. The sternum width is 75% of its length. The labium possesses six large cuspules. A serrula is apparently absent. The colour is the same as in the male.

== Distribution and behaviour ==
This species has been collected in places of inclined, sandy or stony soil. It lives in burrows closed with a single door (unlike Chaco obscura and C. tucumana). The door is thin, on which "growth rings" are sometimes visible. The tube of the burrow is often prolonged with silk and earth in the upper portion. The smooth, well-compacted walls are covered with little silk. It is found in Región Metropolitana and Region V.

== See also ==
- Spider anatomy
