= Lycinus caldera =

Scientific classification
- Kingdom: Animalia
- Phylum: Arthropoda
- Subphylum: Chelicerata
- Class: Arachnida
- Order: Araneae
- Infraorder: Mygalomorphae
- Family: Pycnothelidae
- Genus: Lycinus
- Species: L. caldera

Binomial name
- Lycinus caldera Goloboff, 1995

Species of spider

Lycinus caldera is a mygalomorph spider of Chile.

== See also ==
- Spider anatomy
- Regions of Chile
