= Pselligmus =

Scientific classification
- Kingdom: Animalia
- Phylum: Arthropoda
- Subphylum: Chelicerata
- Class: Arachnida
- Order: Araneae
- Infraorder: Mygalomorphae
- Family: Pycnothelidae
- Genus: Pselligmus
- Species: P. infaustus

Binomial name
- Pselligmus infaustus Simon, 1892

Genus of spiders

Pselligmus is a genus of spiders in the family Pycnothelidae. It was first described in 1892 by Simon. As of 2017, it contains only one Brazilian species, Pselligmus infaustus.
