= Chaco (spider) =

Scientific classification
- Kingdom: Animalia
- Phylum: Arthropoda
- Subphylum: Chelicerata
- Class: Arachnida
- Order: Araneae
- Infraorder: Mygalomorphae
- Family: Pycnothelidae
- Genus: Chaco; Tullgren, 1905

Genus of spiders

Chaco is a genus of spider in the family Pycnothelidae.

== Species ==
As of September 2025, the World Spider Catalog accepted the following species:

- Chaco ansilta Ferretti, 2014 – Argentina
- Chaco aoni Allegue, Pompozzi & Ferretti, 2024 — Argentina
- Chaco castanea Montes de Oca & Pérez-Miles, 2013 – Uruguay
- Chaco costai Montes de Oca & Pérez-Miles, 2013 – Uruguay
- Chaco melloleitaoi (Bücherl, Timotheo & Lucas, 1971) – Brazil
- Chaco obscura Tullgren, 1905 (type species) – Argentina
- Chaco patagonica Goloboff, 1995 – Argentina
- Chaco sanjuanina Goloboff, 1995 – Argentina
- Chaco socos Goloboff, 1995 – Chile
- Chaco tecka Goloboff, 1995 – Argentina
- Chaco tigre Goloboff, 1995 – Chile
- Chaco tingua Indicatti et al., 2015 – Brazil
- Chaco tucumana Goloboff, 1995 – Argentina
