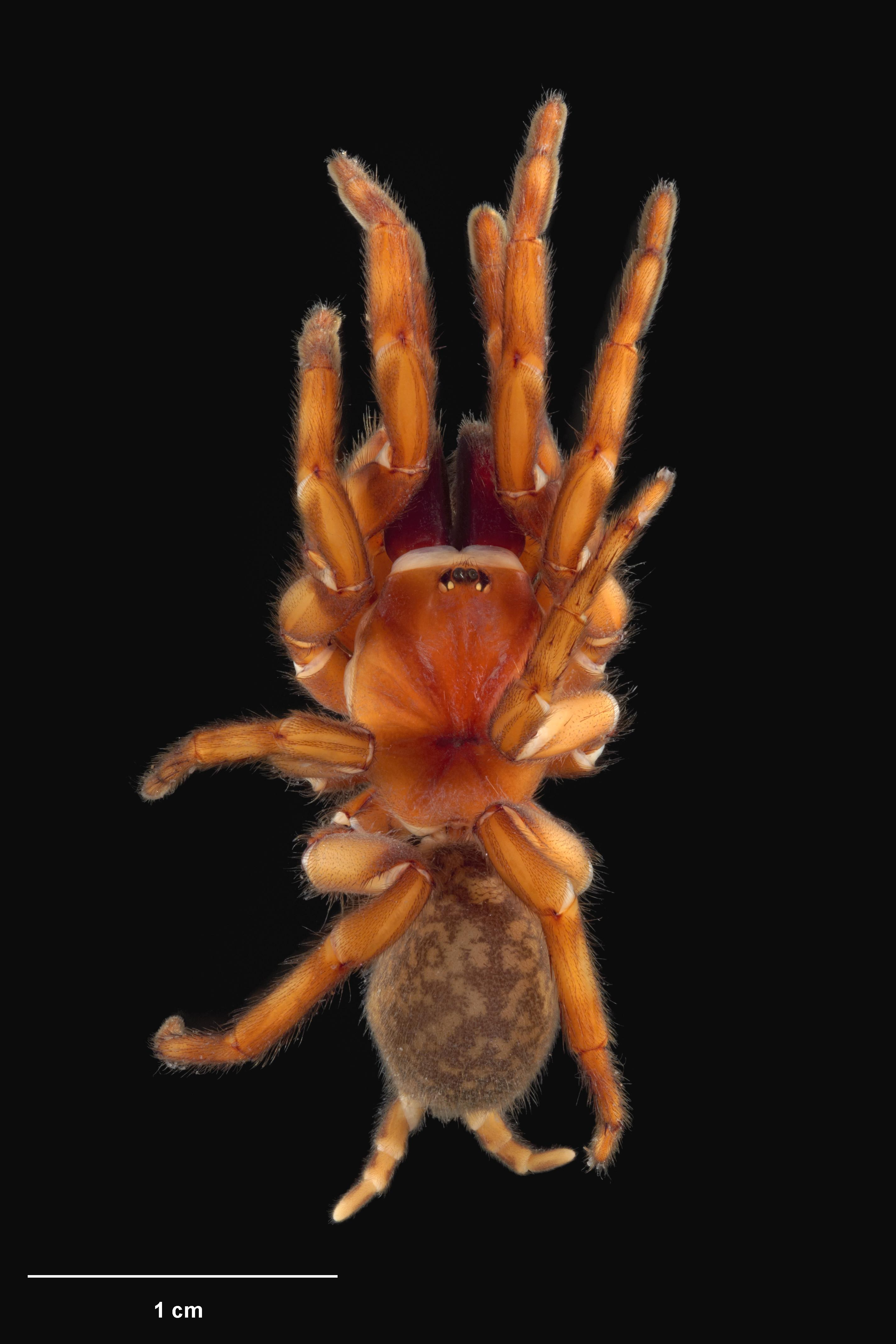

Conservation status
- Naturally Uncommon (NZ TCS)

Scientific classification
- Kingdom: Animalia
- Phylum: Arthropoda
- Subphylum: Chelicerata
- Class: Arachnida
- Order: Araneae
- Infraorder: Mygalomorphae
- Family: Pycnothelidae
- Genus: Stanwellia
- Species: S. hollowayi

Binomial name
- Stanwellia hollowayi (Forster, 1968)

Synonyms
- Aparua hollowayi

= Stanwellia hollowayi =

Species of spider

Stanwellia hollowayi is a species of Mygalomorph spider endemic to New Zealand.

== Taxonomy ==
This species was described as Aparua hollowayi in 1968 by Ray Forster from female specimens collected in Northland. It was transferred into the Stanwellia genus in 1983. This species is stored in Te Papa Museum under registration number AS.000046.

== Description ==
The female is recorded at 17.1mm in length. The carapace and legs are reddish brown. The abdomen is brown with pale patches dorsally.

== Distribution ==
This species is only known from Northland, New Zealand.

== Conservation status ==
Under the New Zealand Threat Classification System, this species is listed as "Naturally Uncommon" with the qualifiers of "One Location".
