= Stanwellia minor =

Scientific classification
- Kingdom: Animalia
- Phylum: Arthropoda
- Subphylum: Chelicerata
- Class: Arachnida
- Order: Araneae
- Infraorder: Mygalomorphae
- Family: Pycnothelidae
- Genus: Stanwellia
- Species: S. minor

Binomial name
- Stanwellia minor (Kulczyński, 1908)

Synonyms
- Aname minor Kulczyński, 1908

Species of spider

Stanwellia minor is a species of mygalomorph spider in the Pycnothelidae family. It is endemic to Australia. It was described in 1908 by Polish arachnologist Władysław Kulczyński.

== Distribution and habitat ==
The species occurs in New South Wales. The type locality is Mount Victoria in the Blue Mountains.

== Behaviour ==
The spiders are fossorial, terrestrial predators.
