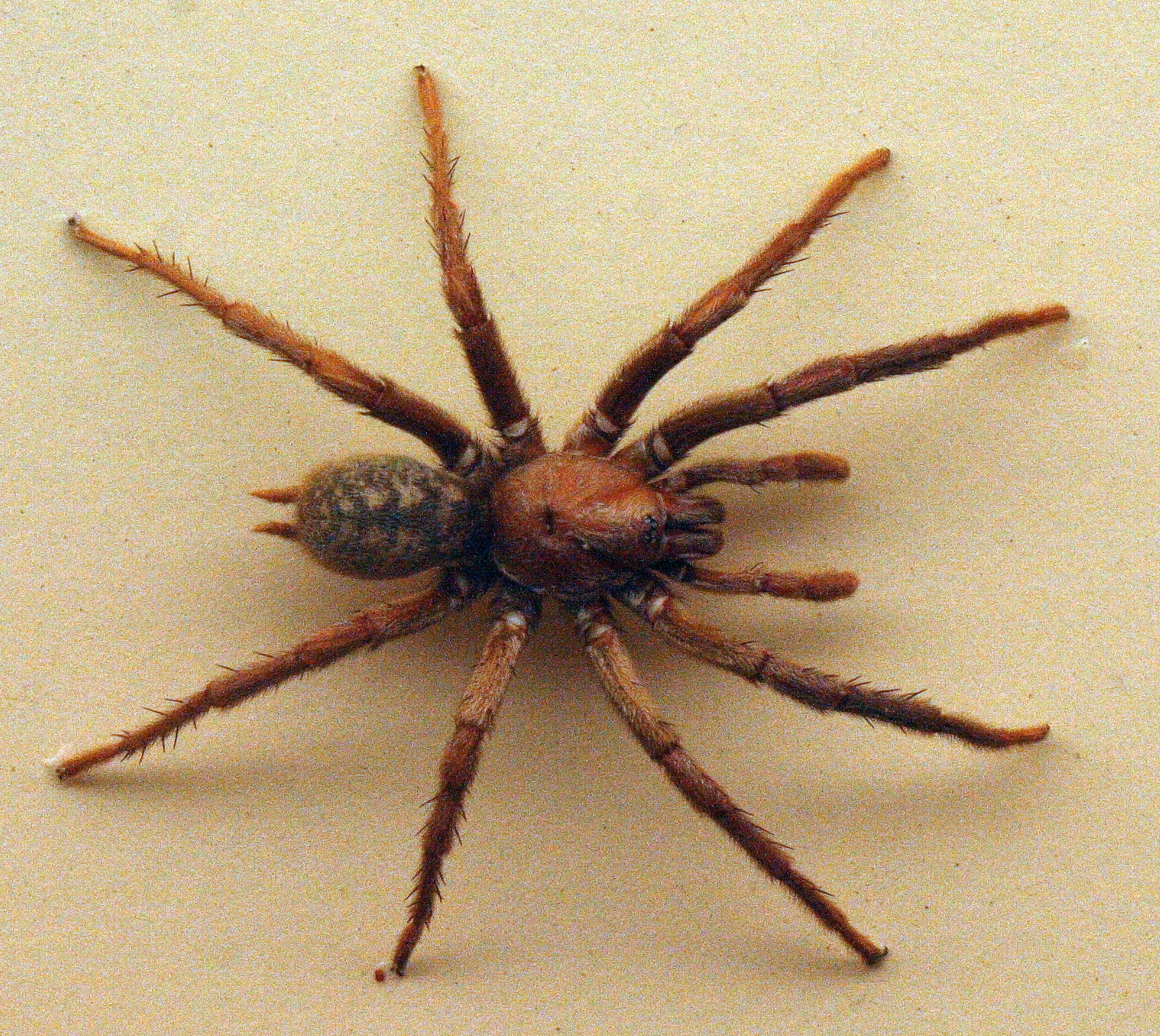
- male
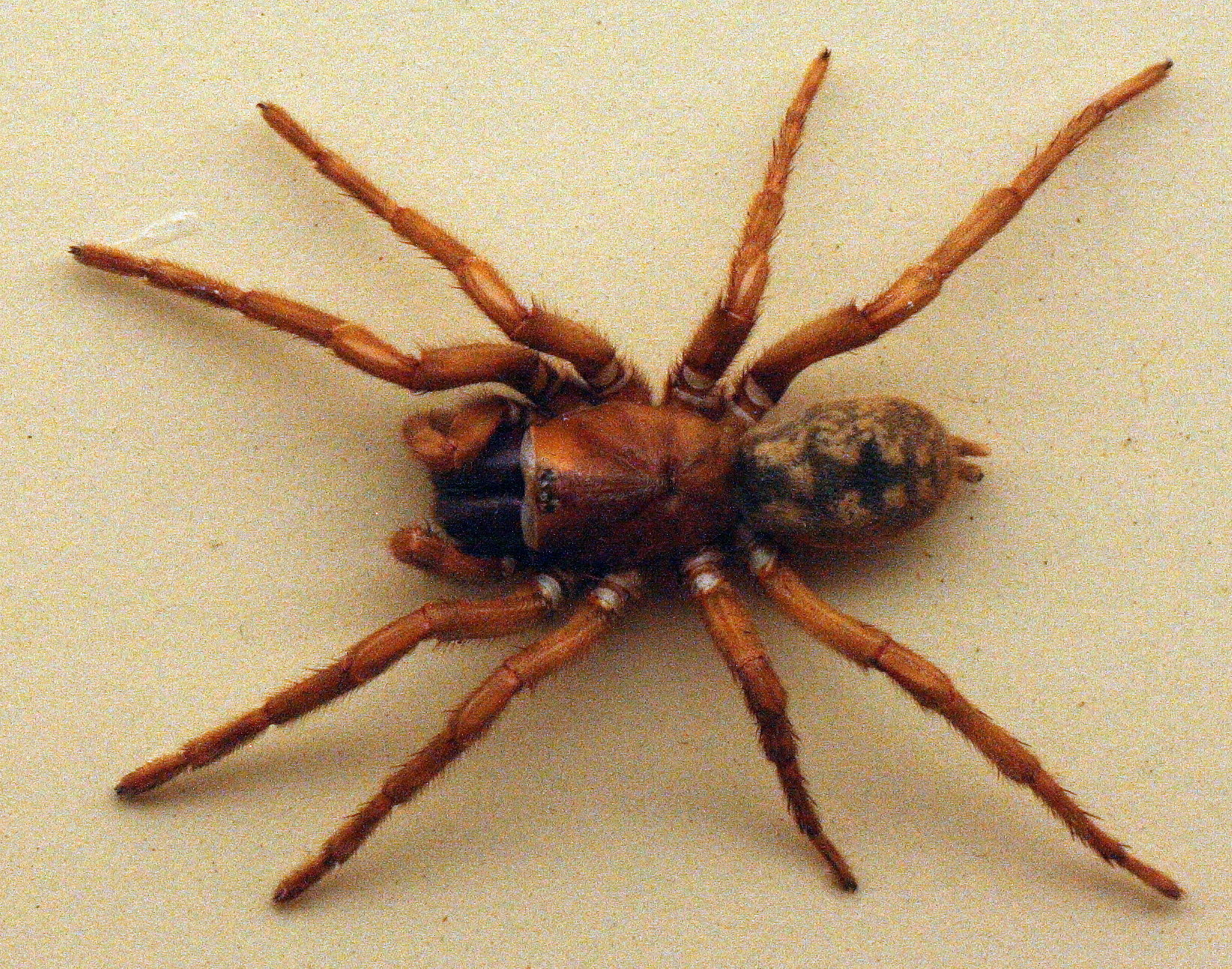
- female

Scientific classification
- Domain: Eukaryota
- Kingdom: Animalia
- Phylum: Arthropoda
- Subphylum: Chelicerata
- Class: Arachnida
- Order: Araneae
- Infraorder: Mygalomorphae
- Family: Pycnothelidae
- Genus: Stanwellia
- Species: S. hoggi

Binomial name
- Stanwellia hoggi (Rainbow, 1914)

Synonyms
- Chenistonia hoggi Rainbow, 1914; Aname decora Rainbow & Pulleine, 1918; Stanwellia decora Rainbow & Pulleine, 1918; Stanwellia hoggi Main, 1972

= Stanwellia hoggi =

Species of ground spider from Australia

Stanwellia hoggi is a ground spider, found in New South Wales, Australia.
