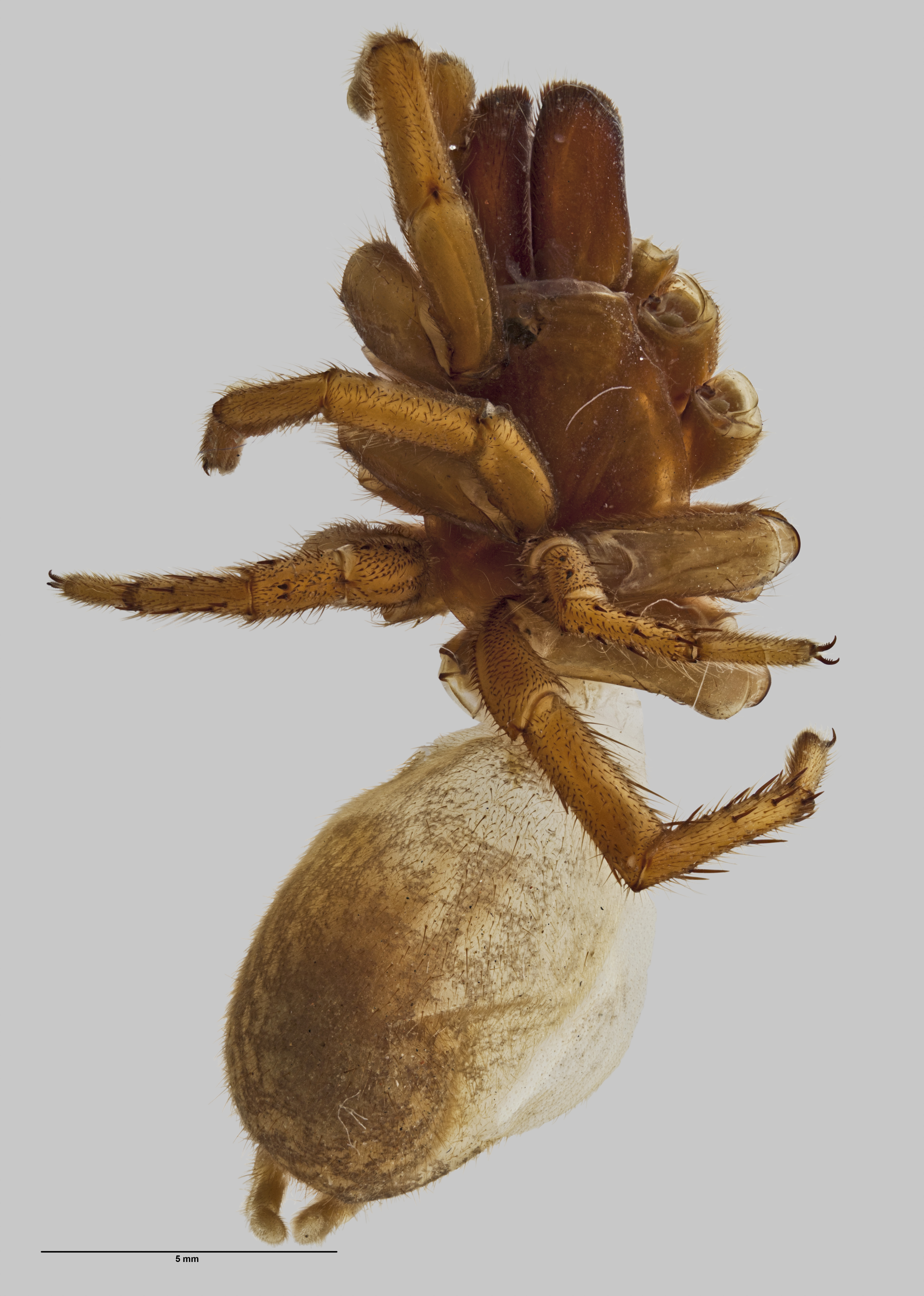

Conservation status
- Data Deficit (NZ TCS)

Scientific classification
- Kingdom: Animalia
- Phylum: Arthropoda
- Subphylum: Chelicerata
- Class: Arachnida
- Order: Araneae
- Infraorder: Mygalomorphae
- Family: Pycnothelidae
- Genus: Stanwellia
- Species: S. houhora

Binomial name
- Stanwellia houhora (Forster, 1968)

Synonyms
- Aparua houhora

= Stanwellia houhora =

Species of spider

Stanwellia houhora is a species of mygalomorph spider endemic to New Zealand.

== Taxonomy ==
This species was described as Aparua houhora in 1968 by Ray Forster from a single female collected in Northland. It was transferred into the Stanwellia genus in 1983. The holotype is stored at Auckland War Memorial Museum under registration number AMNZ5045-1.

== Description ==
The female is recorded at 13.5mm in length. The carapace is orange brown. The legs are yellow brown. The abdomen is brown with patches dorsally.

== Distribution ==
This species is only known from Houhora in Northland, New Zealand.

== Conservation status ==
Under the New Zealand Threat Classification System, this species is listed as "Data Deficient" with the qualifiers of "Data Poor: Size" and "Data Poor: Trend".
