= Stanwellia annulipes =

Scientific classification
- Kingdom: Animalia
- Phylum: Arthropoda
- Subphylum: Chelicerata
- Class: Arachnida
- Order: Araneae
- Infraorder: Mygalomorphae
- Family: Pycnothelidae
- Genus: Stanwellia
- Species: S. annulipes

Binomial name
- Stanwellia annulipes (C.L.Koch, 1842)

Synonyms
- Mygale annulipes C.L.Koch, 1842; Macrothele aculeata Urquhart, 1893; Arbanitis maculipes Hogg, 1903

Species of spider

Stanwellia annulipes is a species of mygalomorph spider in the Pycnothelidae family. It is endemic to Australia. It was described in 1842 by German arachnologist Ludwig Carl Christian Koch.

== Distribution and habitat ==
The species occurs in Tasmania in closed forest habitats.

== Behaviour ==
The spiders are fossorial, terrestrial predators. Their burrows do not have trapdoors.
