= Stenoterommata crassistyla =

Scientific classification
- Kingdom: Animalia
- Phylum: Arthropoda
- Subphylum: Chelicerata
- Class: Arachnida
- Order: Araneae
- Infraorder: Mygalomorphae
- Family: Pycnothelidae
- Genus: Stenoterommata
- Species: S. crassistyla

Binomial name
- Stenoterommata crassistyla Goloboff, 1995

Species of spider

Stenoterommata crassistyla is a species of mygalomorph spiders of Argentina, named after its wide embolus (stylus) in males, distinguishing this species from the sympatric S. tenuistyla. Its behaviour is similar to the latter species as well. Females are distinguished from other Stenoterommata having multireceptaculate spermathecae by the presence of inferior tarsal claws on the anterior legs. Males have the palpal tibia with a basal notch at either side of the base, and swollen. The species is distinguished from S. tenuistyla by lacking the short spines on the male metatarsus I, characteristic of said species.

== Description ==
- Male: total length 8.25 millimetres (0.325 in); cephalothorax length 3.32 millimetres (0.131 in), width 2.5 millimetres (0.098 in); cephalic region length 2.15 millimetres (0.085 in), width 1.37 millimetres (0.054 in); labium length 0.25 millimetres (0.0098 in), width 0.57 millimetres (0.022 in); sternum length 1.79 millimetres (0.070 in), width 1.43 millimetres (0.056 in). Its labium possesses no cuspules. Its sternal sigilla is small, shallow and oval, with its sternum rebordered. Chelicerae: its rastellum is weak, with long, attenuate setae. Cheliceral tumescence is present, with few hairs on its inferior half. Its cephalothorax is reddish brown with golden hairs, while its abdomen is yellowish brown with dark mottles forming.
- Female: total length 10.5 millimetres (0.41 in); cephalothorax length 3.42 millimetres (0.135 in), width 2.52 millimetres (0.099 in); cephalic region length 2.25 millimetres (0.089 in), width 1.8 millimetres (0.071 in); fovea width 0.4 millimetres (0.016 in); labium length 0.32 millimetres (0.013 in), width 0.67 millimetres (0.026 in); sternum length 1.9 millimetres (0.075 in), width 1.62 millimetres (0.064 in). Its cephalic region is convex, with the fovea procurved. Its labium has no cuspules, while its sternal sigilla is small, oval and shallow, with its sternum rebordered. Chelicerae: its rastellum is formed by thick, long setae. Color as in male.

== Distribution ==
Uruguay and Argentina Entre Ríos and northern Buenos Aires Province. The species sometimes coexists with S. tenuistyla.

== See also ==
- Spider anatomy
