= Xenonemesia =

Scientific classification
- Kingdom: Animalia
- Phylum: Arthropoda
- Subphylum: Chelicerata
- Class: Arachnida
- Order: Araneae
- Infraorder: Mygalomorphae
- Family: Pycnothelidae
- Genus: Xenonemesia; Goloboff

Species
- Xenonemesia araucaria Indicatti, Lucas, Ott & Brescovit, 2008; Xenonemesia otti Indicatti, Lucas & Brescovit, 2007; Xenonemesia platensis Goloboff, 1989

Genus of spiders

Xenonemesia is a genus of spiders in the family Pycnothelidae. It was first described in 1989 by Goloboff. As of 2016, it contains 3 South American species.
