= Stanwellia pexa =

Scientific classification
- Kingdom: Animalia
- Phylum: Arthropoda
- Subphylum: Chelicerata
- Class: Arachnida
- Order: Araneae
- Infraorder: Mygalomorphae
- Family: Pycnothelidae
- Genus: Stanwellia
- Species: S. pexa

Binomial name
- Stanwellia pexa (Hickman, 1930)

Synonyms
- Aname pexa Hickman, 1930

Species of spider

Stanwellia pexa is a species of mygalomorph spider in the Pycnothelidae family. It is endemic to Australia. It was described in 1930 by Australian arachnologist Vernon Victor Hickman.

== Distribution and habitat ==
The species occurs in Tasmania, including Bass Strait islands, along coastlines in supralittoral habitats. The type locality is Prince of Wales Bay, Derwent Park, Hobart.

== Behaviour ==
The spiders are fossorial, terrestrial predators.
