= Stanwellia media =

Conservation status
- Not Threatened (NZ TCS)

Scientific classification
- Kingdom: Animalia
- Phylum: Arthropoda
- Subphylum: Chelicerata
- Class: Arachnida
- Order: Araneae
- Infraorder: Mygalomorphae
- Family: Pycnothelidae
- Genus: Stanwellia
- Species: S. media

Binomial name
- Stanwellia media (Forster, 1968)

Synonyms
- Aparua media

Species of spider

Stanwellia media is a species of mygalomorph spider endemic to New Zealand.

== Taxonomy ==
This species was described as Aparua media in 1968 by Ray Forster from female specimens collected in Cambridge. It was transferred into the Stanwellia genus in 1983. The holotype is stored at Otago Museum.

== Description ==
The female is recorded at 14.5mm in length. The carapace is reddish brown. The legs are orange brown. The abdomen is cream brown markings dorsally.

== Distribution ==
This species is only known from Bay of Plenty and Cambridge in New Zealand.

== Conservation status ==
Under the New Zealand Threat Classification System, this species is listed as "Not Threatened".
