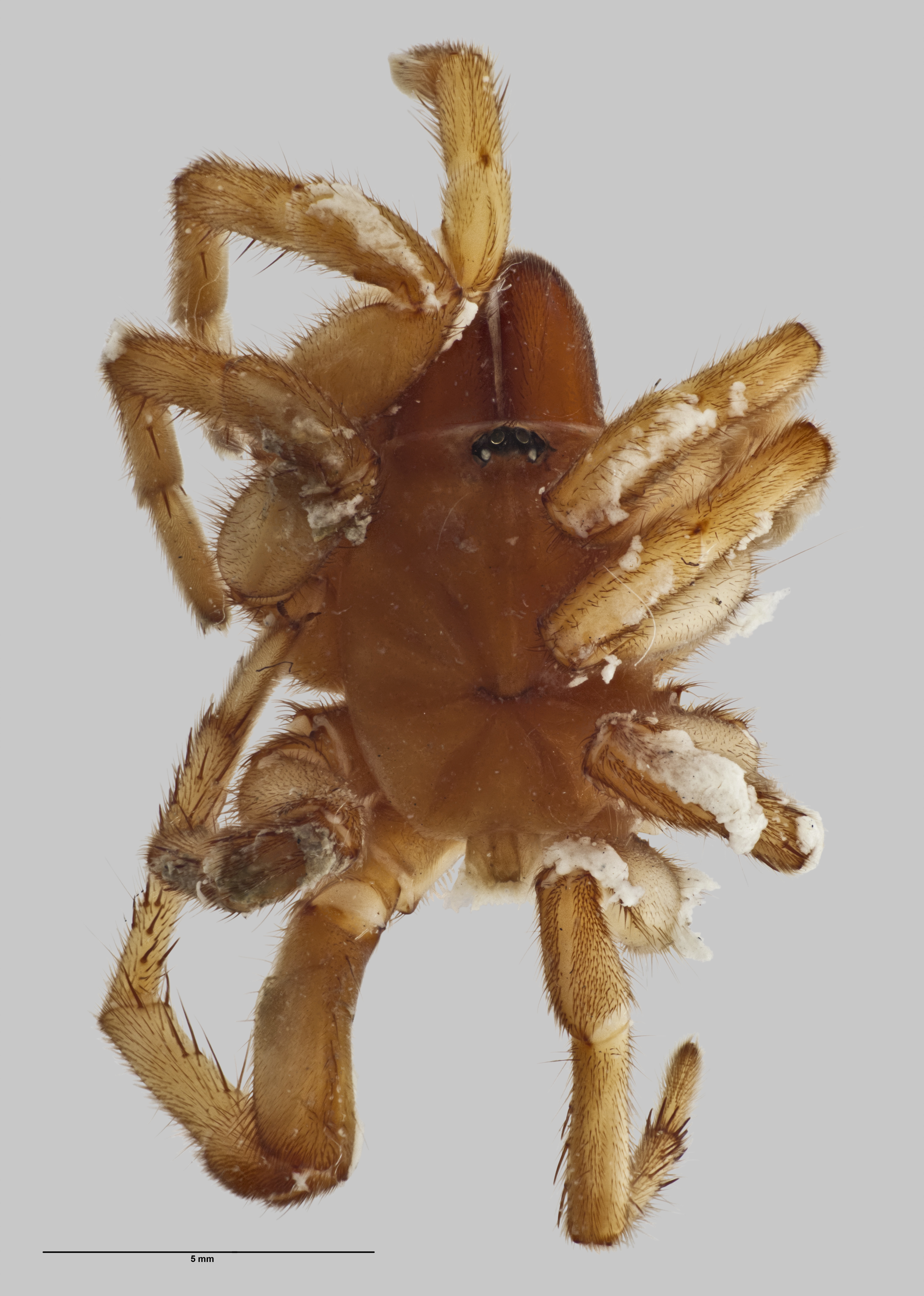

Conservation status
- Naturally Uncommon (NZ TCS)

Scientific classification
- Kingdom: Animalia
- Phylum: Arthropoda
- Subphylum: Chelicerata
- Class: Arachnida
- Order: Araneae
- Infraorder: Mygalomorphae
- Family: Pycnothelidae
- Genus: Stanwellia
- Species: S. taranga

Binomial name
- Stanwellia taranga (Forster, 1968)

Synonyms
- Aparua taranga

= Stanwellia taranga =

Species of spider

Stanwellia taranga is a species of mygalomorph spider endemic to New Zealand.

== Taxonomy ==
This species was described as Aparua taranga in 1968 by Ray Forster from a single female specimen collected in Hen Island. It was transferred into the Stanwellia genus in 1983. The holotype is stored in Auckland War Memorial Museum under registration number AMNZ5047.

== Description ==
The female is recorded at 14.5mm in length. The carapace and legs are orange to yellow brown. The abdomen is cream with a mottled pattern.

== Distribution ==
This species is only known from Hen Island, New Zealand.

== Conservation status ==
Under the New Zealand Threat Classification System, this species is listed as "Naturally Uncommon" with the qualifiers of "Island Endemic" and "One Location".
