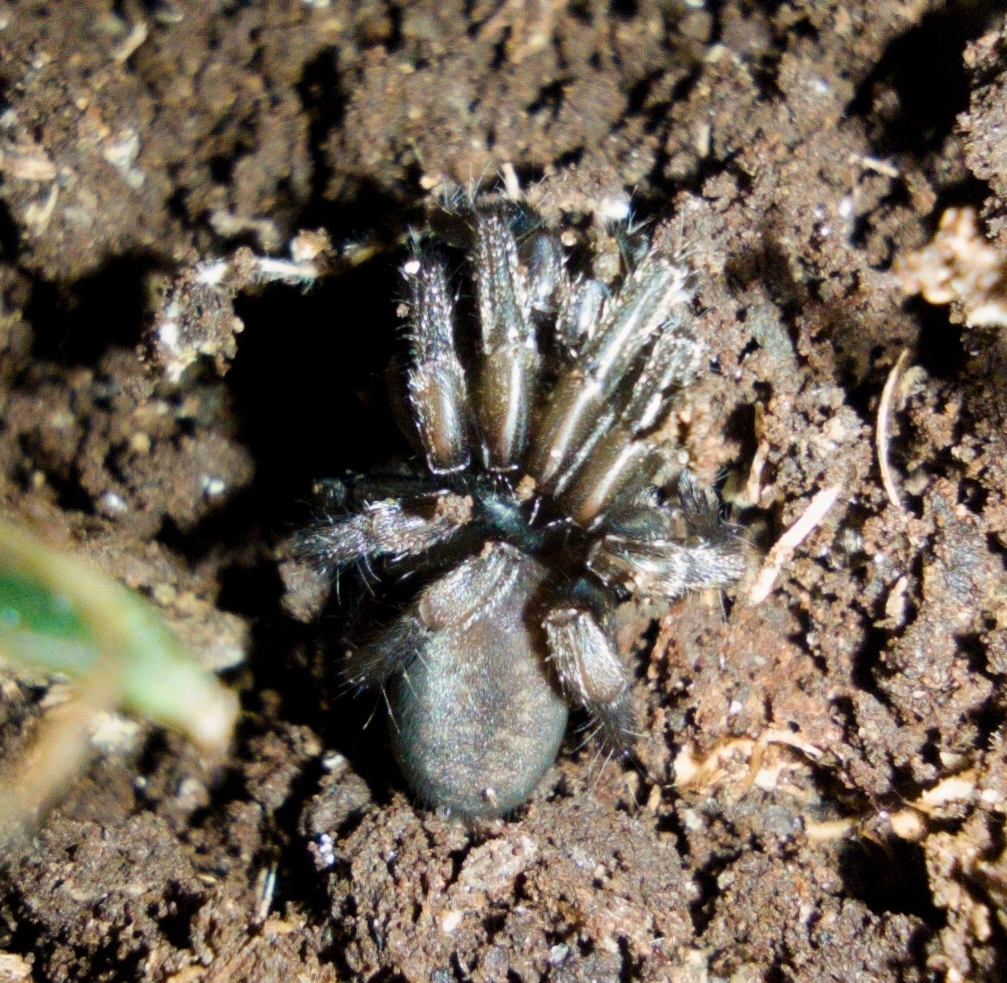
- Prorachias sp. in Brazil

Scientific classification
- Kingdom: Animalia
- Phylum: Arthropoda
- Subphylum: Chelicerata
- Class: Arachnida
- Order: Araneae
- Infraorder: Mygalomorphae
- Family: Pycnothelidae
- Genus: Prorachias
- Species: P. bristowei

Binomial name
- Prorachias bristowei Mello-Leitão, 1924

= Prorachias =

Genus of spiders

Prorachias is a genus of spiders in the family Pycnothelidae. It was first described in 1924 by Mello-Leitão. As of 2017, it contains only one Brazilian species, Prorachias bristowei.
