= Chaco socos =

Scientific classification
- Kingdom: Animalia
- Phylum: Arthropoda
- Subphylum: Chelicerata
- Class: Arachnida
- Order: Araneae
- Infraorder: Mygalomorphae
- Family: Pycnothelidae
- Genus: Chaco
- Species: C. socos

Binomial name
- Chaco socos Goloboff, 1995

Species of spider

Chaco socos is a species of mygalomorph spiders of Chile, named after its type locality: Socos, Limarí, Region IV (Coquimbo region). This species differs from C. tigre by its spermathecae having a longer duct and a less globose fundus, and by constructing a beveled door for its burrow; the general colouration is grayish, while C. tigre is more brownish coloured.

== Description ==
The male has a total length of 11.3 millimetres (0.44 in); a cephalothorax length of 5.00 millimetres (0.197 in) and width of 4.27 millimetres (0.168 in); a cephalic region length of 3.10 millimetres (0.122 in) and width of 2.67 millimetres (0.105 in); an ocular quadrangle (OQ) length of 0.61 millimetres (0.024 in) and width of 1.07 millimetres (0.042 in); a labium length of 0.52 millimetres (0.020 in) and width of 0.79 millimetres (0.031 in); and a sternum length of 2.75 millimetres (0.108 in) and width of 2.11 millimetres (0.083 in). The labium possesses five cuspules. Its posterior sternal sigilla is small and shallow. Its cephalothorax is ashgray, with a lycosid-like pattern, while the legs and palpi are gray with darker spots; its abdomen yellowish with darker dorsal spots.

The female has a total length of 14.89 millimetres (0.586 in); a cephalothorax length of 5.25 millimetres (0.207 in) and width of 4.36 millimetres (0.172 in); its labium length is 48% of the width; the sternum width is 72% of the length. The labium possesses three cuspules. The colour is the same as in the male.

== Distribution and behaviour ==
This species has been collected in two localities, in high mountains near the sea, with moist soil. The animals construct a thick door for their burrow, which fits into the burrow opening. The outer face of the door is slightly concave, while the burrow walls are well-compacted and lined with silk.

== See also ==
- Spider anatomy
