= Longistylus =

Scientific classification
- Kingdom: Animalia
- Phylum: Arthropoda
- Subphylum: Chelicerata
- Class: Arachnida
- Order: Araneae
- Infraorder: Mygalomorphae
- Family: Pycnothelidae
- Genus: Longistylus
- Species: L. ygapema

Binomial name
- Longistylus ygapema Indicatti & Lucas, 2005

Genus of spiders

Longistylus is a genus of spiders in the family Pycnothelidae. It was first described in 2005 by Indicatti & Lucas. As of 2017, it contains only one Brazilian species, Longistylus ygapema.
