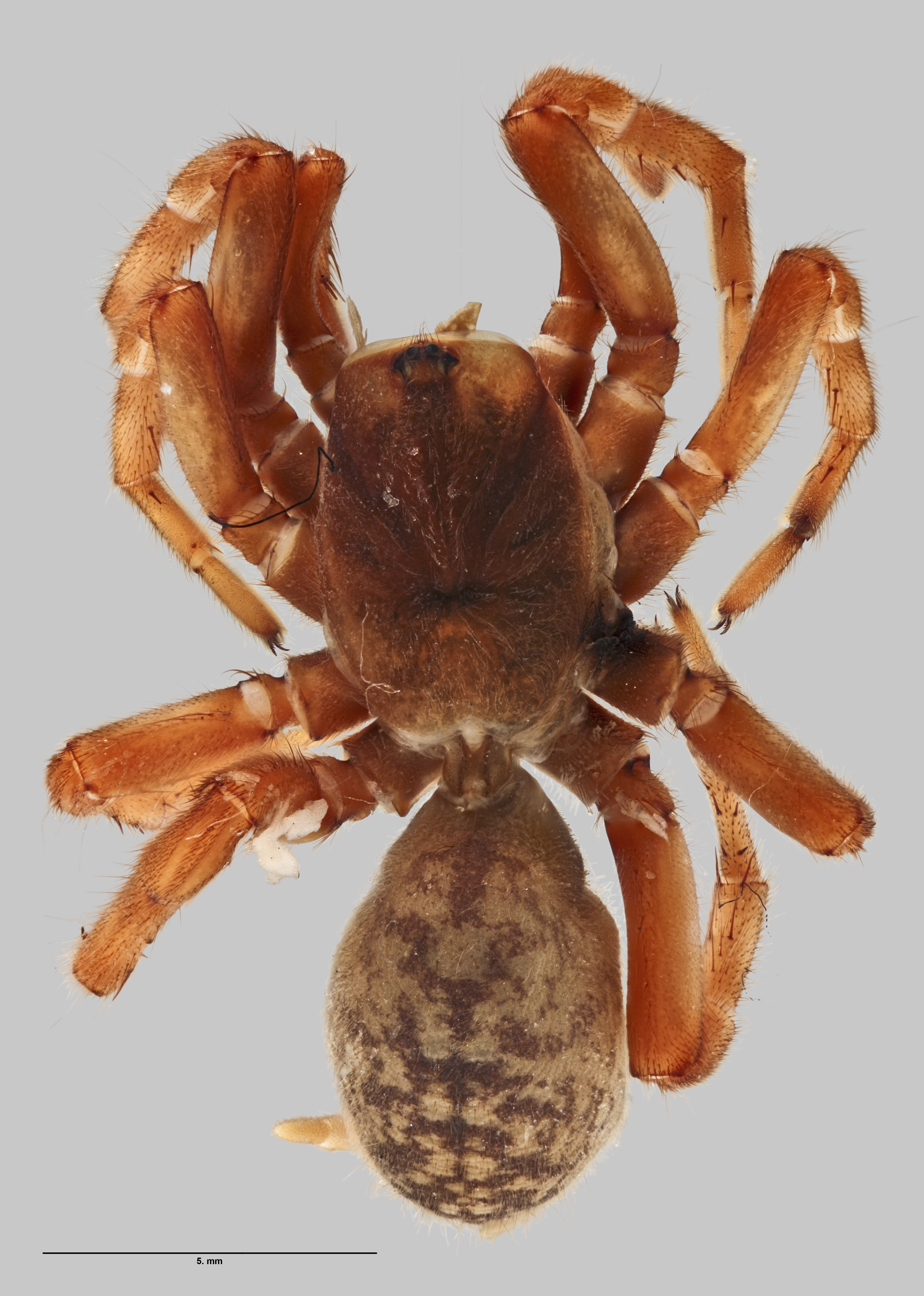

Conservation status
- Naturally Uncommon (NZ TCS)

Scientific classification
- Kingdom: Animalia
- Phylum: Arthropoda
- Subphylum: Chelicerata
- Class: Arachnida
- Order: Araneae
- Infraorder: Mygalomorphae
- Family: Pycnothelidae
- Genus: Stanwellia
- Species: S. hapua

Binomial name
- Stanwellia hapua (Forster, 1968)
- Stanwellia hapua range (in green)

Synonyms
- Aparua hapua

= Stanwellia hapua =

Species of spider

Stanwellia hapua is a species of mygalomorph spider endemic to New Zealand.

== Taxonomy ==
This species was described as Aparua hapua in 1968 by Ray Forster from a single female specimen collected in Little Barrier Island by Graham Turbott. It was transferred into the Stanwellia genus in 1983. The holotype is stored in Auckland War Memorial Museum under registration number AMNZ5044.

== Description ==
The female is recorded at 11.3mm in length. The carapace is reddish brown. The legs are yellow brown. The abdomen has reddish brown markings dorsally.

== Distribution ==
This species is only known from Little Barrier Island, New Zealand.

== Conservation status ==
Under the New Zealand Threat Classification System, this species is listed as "Naturally Uncommon" with the qualifiers of "Island Endemic" and "One Location".
