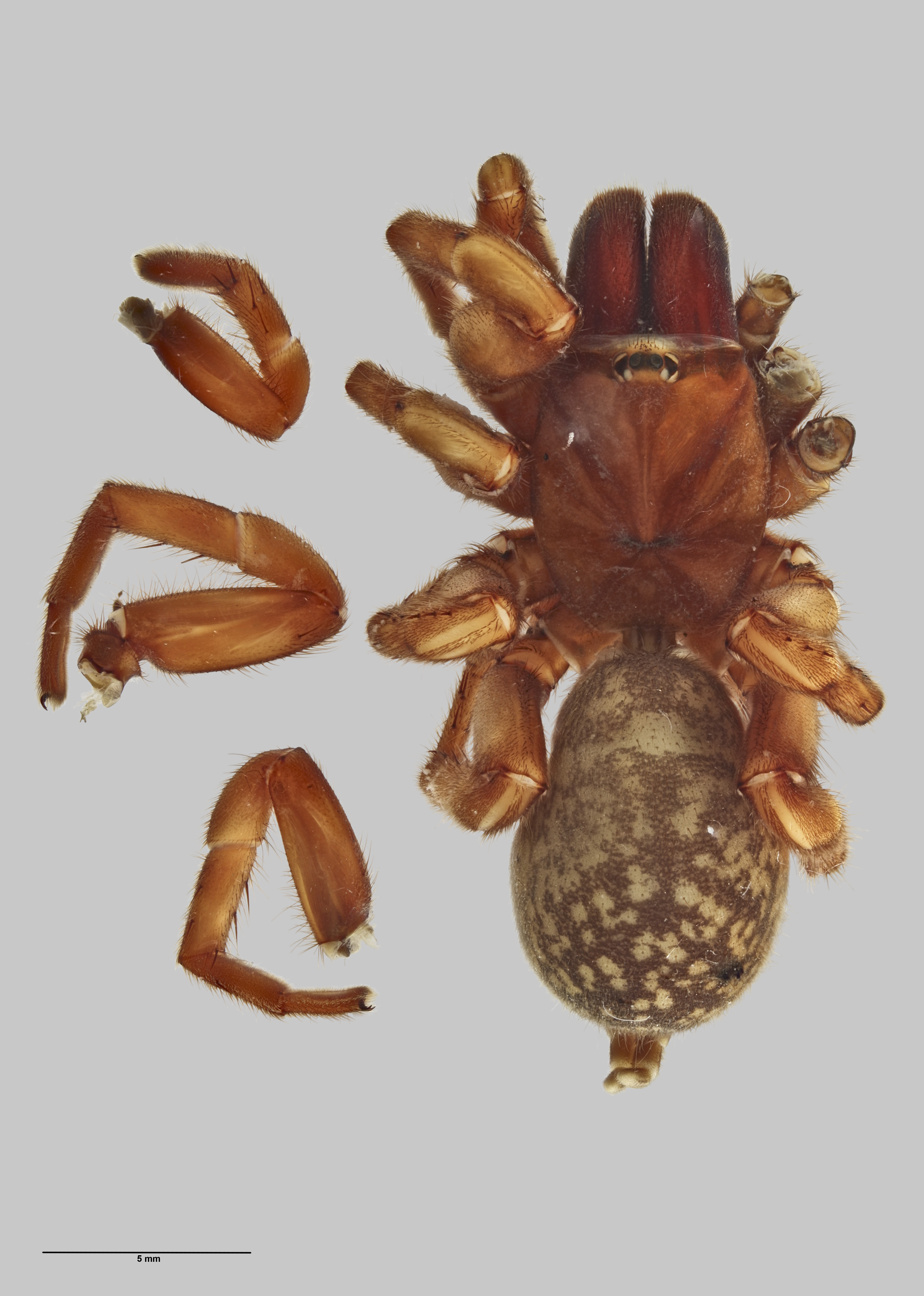

Conservation status
- Naturally Uncommon (NZ TCS)

Scientific classification
- Kingdom: Animalia
- Phylum: Arthropoda
- Subphylum: Chelicerata
- Class: Arachnida
- Order: Araneae
- Infraorder: Mygalomorphae
- Family: Pycnothelidae
- Genus: Stanwellia
- Species: S. regia

Binomial name
- Stanwellia regia (Forster, 1968)

Synonyms
- Aparua regia

= Stanwellia regia =

Species of spider

Stanwellia regia is a species of mygalomorph spider endemic to New Zealand.

== Taxonomy ==
This species was described as Aparua regia in 1968 by Ray Forster from female and male specimens collected in Three Kings Islands. It was transferred into the Stanwellia genus in 1983. The holotype is stored at Auckland War Memorial Museum under registration number AMNZ5046.

== Description ==
The female is recorded at 20mm in length. The carapace and legs are orange brown. The abdomen is reticulated with reddish brown dorsally. The male is recorded at 14.8mm in length.

== Distribution ==
This species is only known from Great Island in Three Kings Islands, New Zealand.

== Conservation status ==
Under the New Zealand Threat Classification System, this species is listed as "Naturally Uncommon" with the qualifiers of "Island Endemic" and "One Location".
