= Afromygale =

Scientific classification
- Kingdom: Animalia
- Phylum: Arthropoda
- Subphylum: Chelicerata
- Class: Arachnida
- Order: Araneae
- Infraorder: Mygalomorphae
- Family: Pycnothelidae
- Genus: Afromygale; Zonstein, 2020

Type species
- A. rukanga Zonstein, 2020

Species
- Afromygale pinnipalpis Zonstein, 2020; Afromygale rukanga Zonstein, 2020

Genus of spiders

Afromygale is a small genus of east African mygalomorph spiders in the family Pycnothelidae. It was first described by S. L. Zonstein in 2020. As of March 2022 it contains only two species: A. pinnipalpis and A. rukanga.
