= Stanwellia bipectinata =

Conservation status
- Data Deficient (NZ TCS)

Scientific classification
- Kingdom: Animalia
- Phylum: Arthropoda
- Subphylum: Chelicerata
- Class: Arachnida
- Order: Araneae
- Infraorder: Mygalomorphae
- Family: Pycnothelidae
- Genus: Stanwellia
- Species: S. bipectinata

Binomial name
- Stanwellia bipectinata (Todd, 1945)

Synonyms
- Aparua bipectinata

Species of spider

Stanwellia bipectinata is a species of mygalomorph spider endemic to New Zealand.

== Taxonomy ==
This species was described as Aparua bipectinata in 1945 by Valerie Todd from male and female specimens collected in Whanganui. It was transferred into the Stanwellia genus in 1983. The holotype is stored at Otago Museum.

== Description ==
The female is recorded at 11.3mm in length. The carapace and legs are orange brown. The abdomen is creamy yellow with black markings dorsally. The male is recorded at 8.8mm in length. The colours are similar to that of the female.

== Distribution ==
This species is only known from Makirikiri in Whanganui, New Zealand.

== Conservation status ==
Under the New Zealand Threat Classification System, this species is listed as "Data Deficient" with the qualifiers of "Data Poor: Size", "Data Poor: Trend" and "One Location".
