= Stanwellia kaituna =

Conservation status
- Naturally Uncommon (NZ TCS)

Scientific classification
- Kingdom: Animalia
- Phylum: Arthropoda
- Subphylum: Chelicerata
- Class: Arachnida
- Order: Araneae
- Infraorder: Mygalomorphae
- Family: Pycnothelidae
- Genus: Stanwellia
- Species: S. kaituna

Binomial name
- Stanwellia kaituna (Forster, 1968)

Synonyms
- Aparua kaituna

Species of spider

Stanwellia kaituna is a species of mygalomorph spider endemic to New Zealand.

== Taxonomy ==
This species was described as Aparua kaituna in 1968 by Ray Forster from male and female specimens collected in Canterbury. It was transferred into the Stanwellia genus in 1983. The holotype is stored at Canterbury Museum.

== Description ==
The male is recorded at 6.2mm in length. The carapace and legs are pale yellow brown. The abdomen is cream with black patches dorsally. The female is recorded at 12.3mm in length. The carapace and legs are orange brown. The abdomen is cream with a dark band dorsally.

== Distribution ==
This species is only known from Banks Peninsula in Canterbury, New Zealand.

== Conservation status ==
Under the New Zealand Threat Classification System, this species is listed as "Naturally Uncommon" with the qualifiers of "One Location".
