= Stanwellia puna =

Conservation status
- Naturally Uncommon (NZ TCS)

Scientific classification
- Kingdom: Animalia
- Phylum: Arthropoda
- Subphylum: Chelicerata
- Class: Arachnida
- Order: Araneae
- Infraorder: Mygalomorphae
- Family: Pycnothelidae
- Genus: Stanwellia
- Species: S. puna

Binomial name
- Stanwellia puna (Forster, 1968)

Synonyms
- Aparua puna

Species of spider

Stanwellia puna is a species of mygalomorph spider endemic to New Zealand.

== Taxonomy ==
This species was described as Aparua puna in 1968 by Ray Forster from a single female specimen collected in Cuvier Island. It was transferred into the Stanwellia genus in 1983. The holotype is stored at Otago Museum.

== Description ==
The female is recorded at 11.3mm in length. The carapace and legs are orange brown. The abdomen is cream with reddish brown markings dorsally.

== Distribution ==
This species is only known from Cuvier Island, New Zealand.

== Conservation status ==
Under the New Zealand Threat Classification System, this species is listed as "Naturally Uncommon" with the qualifiers of "Island Endemic" and "One Location".
