= Lycinus =

Scientific classification
- Kingdom: Animalia
- Phylum: Arthropoda
- Subphylum: Chelicerata
- Class: Arachnida
- Order: Araneae
- Infraorder: Mygalomorphae
- Family: Pycnothelidae
- Genus: Lycinus; Thorell, 1894

Synonyms
- Diplothelopsis Tullgren, 1905; Levina Zapfe, 1963; Parachubutia Mello-Leitão, 1940

Genus of spiders

Lycinus is a genus of spider in the family Pycnothelidae, found in parts of South America.

== Species ==
As of April 2022, the World Spider Catalog accepted 14 species:

- Lycinus bonariensis (Mello-Leitão, 1938) – Argentina
- Lycinus caldera Goloboff, 1995 – Chile
- Lycinus choros Lucas & Indicatti, 2010 – Chile
- Lycinus domeyko Goloboff, 1995 – Chile
- Lycinus epipiptus (Zapfe, 1963) – Chile, Argentina
- Lycinus frayjorge Goloboff, 1995 – Chile
- Lycinus gajardoi (Mello-Leitão, 1940) – Chile
- Lycinus lagigliai Ferretti, 2015 – Argentina
- Lycinus longipes Thorell, 1894 (type species) – Argentina
- Lycinus nevadoensis Ferretti, 2015 – Argentina
- Lycinus ornatus (Tullgren, 1905) – Argentina
- Lycinus portoseguro Lucas & Indicatti, 2010 – Brazil
- Lycinus quilicura Goloboff, 1995 – Chile
- Lycinus tofo Goloboff, 1995 – Chile
