= Stanwellia inornata =

Scientific classification
- Kingdom: Animalia
- Phylum: Arthropoda
- Subphylum: Chelicerata
- Class: Arachnida
- Order: Araneae
- Infraorder: Mygalomorphae
- Family: Pycnothelidae
- Genus: Stanwellia
- Species: S. inornata

Binomial name
- Stanwellia inornata Main, 1972

Species of spider

Stanwellia inornata is a species of mygalomorph spider in the Pycnothelidae family. It is endemic to Australia. It was described in 1972 by Australian arachnologist Barbara York Main.

== Distribution and habitat ==
The species occurs in Victoria, in tall open forest habitats with a heath understorey on sandy soils. The type locality is Rose's Gap in the Grampian Mountains.

== Behaviour ==
The spiders are fossorial, terrestrial predators.
