= Psalistopoides =

Scientific classification
- Domain: Eukaryota
- Kingdom: Animalia
- Phylum: Arthropoda
- Subphylum: Chelicerata
- Class: Arachnida
- Order: Araneae
- Infraorder: Mygalomorphae
- Family: Pycnothelidae
- Genus: Psalistopoides; Mello-Leitão

Species
- Psalistopoides emanueli Lucas & Indicatti, 2006; Psalistopoides fulvimanus Mello-Leitão, 1934

Genus of spiders

Psalistopoides is a genus of spiders in the family Pycnothelidae. It was first described in 1934 by Mello-Leitão. As of 2017, it contains 2 species from Brazil.
