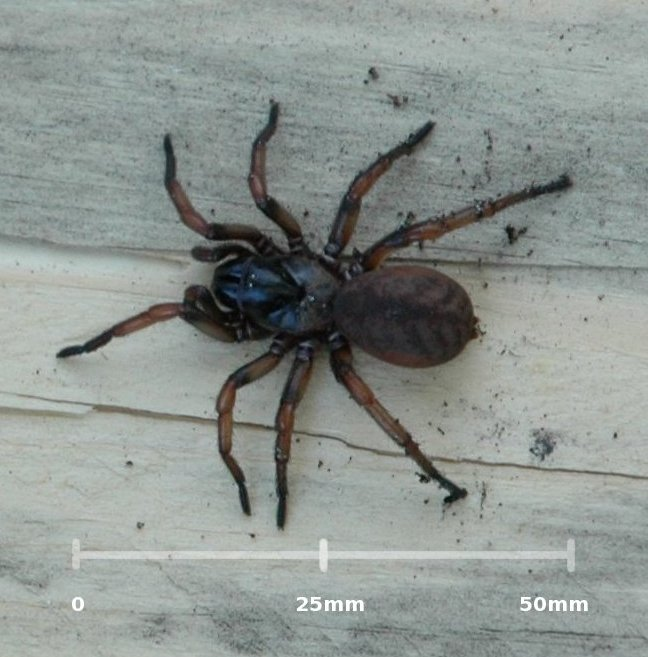

Scientific classification
- Kingdom: Animalia
- Phylum: Arthropoda
- Subphylum: Chelicerata
- Class: Arachnida
- Order: Araneae
- Infraorder: Mygalomorphae
- Family: Pycnothelidae
- Genus: Stanwellia
- Species: S. grisea

Binomial name
- Stanwellia grisea (Hogg, 1901)

Synonyms
- Aname grisea Hogg, 1901; Aname arborea Hogg, 1901; Aname pellucida Hogg, 1901; Ixamatus gregori Hogg, 1901; Chenistonia major Hogg, 1901; Aname butleri Rainbow & Pulleine, 1918

= Stanwellia grisea =

Species of spider

Stanwellia grisea, also known as the Melbourne trapdoor spider, is a species of mygalomorph spider in the Pycnothelidae family. It is endemic to Australia. It was described in 1901 by British arachnologist Henry Roughton Hogg.

== Description ==
Female spiders grow up to 35 mm in body length; males to 25 mm. The body is brown; the abdomen may be paler with a darker, rib-like pattern on the upper surface. Large cheliceral fangs are displayed when the spider feels threatened.

== Distribution and habitat ==
The spiders are found in southern Victoria in tall open forest habitats. Their range includes the environs of the city of Melbourne and the Grampian Mountains. The type locality is Macedon.

== Behaviour ==
The spiders are fossorial, terrestrial predators. Both males and females dig individual silk-lined burrows, up to 40 cm deep in soft earth, with silk threads radiating from the entrances. They ambush insects and other small prey at night from the burrow entrances which, despite the common name, do not have trapdoors. During autumn and early winter, males leave their burrows and wander widely in search of mates.

=== Interactions with humans ===
The spiders, especially the roaming males, can be encountered in gardens and urban areas. Their fangs are capable of delivering a deep and painful bite, which may cause a local reaction.
