= Stanwellia nebulosa =

Scientific classification
- Kingdom: Animalia
- Phylum: Arthropoda
- Subphylum: Chelicerata
- Class: Arachnida
- Order: Araneae
- Infraorder: Mygalomorphae
- Family: Pycnothelidae
- Genus: Stanwellia
- Species: S. nebulosa

Binomial name
- Stanwellia nebulosa (Rainbow & Pulleine, 1918)

Synonyms
- Aname nebulosa Rainbow & Pulleine, 1918; Aname confusa Rainbow & Pulleine, 1918

Species of spider

Stanwellia nebulosa, also known as the nebular trapdoor spider, is a species of mygalomorph spider in the Pycnothelidae family. It is endemic to Australia. It was described in 1918 by Australian arachnologists William Joseph Rainbow and Robert Henry Pulleine.

== Distribution and habitat ==
The species occurs in south-east South Australia, including the Mount Lofty Ranges and the environs of Adelaide, in low woodland and open forest habitats on the loamy or limestone soils in which the spiders dig their burrows. Type localities include Mylor and Mallala.

== Behaviour ==
The spiders are fossorial, terrestrial predators.
