= Stenoterommata luederwaldti =

Scientific classification
- Kingdom: Animalia
- Phylum: Arthropoda
- Subphylum: Chelicerata
- Class: Arachnida
- Order: Araneae
- Infraorder: Mygalomorphae
- Family: Pycnothelidae
- Genus: Stenoterommata
- Species: S. luederwaldti

Binomial name
- Stenoterommata luederwaldti Mello-Leitão, 1922

Genus of spiders

Stenoterommata luederwaldti is a species of spiders found in Brazil in the family Pycnothelidae, although it formerly belonged in the genus Hermachura. It was first described in 1922 by Cândido Firmino de Mello-Leitão.
