= Stanwellia occidentalis =

Scientific classification
- Kingdom: Animalia
- Phylum: Arthropoda
- Subphylum: Chelicerata
- Class: Arachnida
- Order: Araneae
- Infraorder: Mygalomorphae
- Family: Pycnothelidae
- Genus: Stanwellia
- Species: S. occidentalis

Binomial name
- Stanwellia occidentalis Main, 1972

Species of spider

Stanwellia occidentalis is a species of mygalomorph spider in the Pycnothelidae family. It is endemic to Australia. It was described in 1972 by Australian arachnologist Barbara York Main.

== Distribution and habitat ==
The species occurs in South Australia, in open scrub and supralittoral habitats. The type locality is North Shields, 10 km north of Port Lincoln, on the east coast of the Eyre Peninsula.

== Behaviour ==
The spiders are fossorial, terrestrial predators.
