= Stenoterommata =

Scientific classification
- Kingdom: Animalia
- Phylum: Arthropoda
- Subphylum: Chelicerata
- Class: Arachnida
- Order: Araneae
- Infraorder: Mygalomorphae
- Family: Pycnothelidae
- Genus: Stenoterommata; Holmberg, 1881

Type species
- S. platensis Holmberg, 1881

Species
- 26, see text

Synonyms
- Ctenochelus Mello-Leitão, 1923

Genus of spiders

Stenoterommata is a genus of South American araneomorph spiders in the family Pycnothelidae. It was first described by E. L. Holmberg in 1881. Originally placed with the Ctenizidae, it was transferred to the funnel-web trapdoor spiders in 1985, then to the Pycnothelidae in 2020. It is a senior synonym of Ctenochelus.

The name is a Latinized form of the Ancient Greek "stenoterommatos", referring to posterior eyes that are narrower than any other species in Argentina.

== Species ==
As of December 2022 it contains 26 species, found in Argentina, Uruguay, and Brazil:

- Stenoterommata arnolisei Indicatti, Lucas, Ott & Brescovit, 2008 – Brazil
- Stenoterommata bodoquena Ghirotto & Indicatti, 2021 – Brazil
- Stenoterommata chavarii Ghirotto & Indicatti, 2021 – Brazil
- Stenoterommata crassimana (Mello-Leitão, 1923) – Brazil
- Stenoterommata crassistyla Goloboff, 1995 – Uruguay, Argentina
- Stenoterommata curiy Indicatti, Lucas, Ott & Brescovit, 2008 – Brazil
- Stenoterommata egric Ghirotto & Indicatti, 2021 – Brazil
- Stenoterommata grimpa Indicatti, Lucas, Ott & Brescovit, 2008 – Brazil
- Stenoterommata gugai Indicatti, Chavari, Zucatelli-Júnior, Lucas & Brescovit, 2017 – Brazil
- Stenoterommata iguazu Goloboff, 1995 – Argentina
- Stenoterommata isa (Nicoletta, Panchuk, Peralta-Seen & Ferretti, 2022) – Argentina
- Stenoterommata leporina (Simon, 1891) – Brazil
- Stenoterommata leticiae Indicatti, Chavari, Zucatelli-Júnior, Lucas & Brescovit, 2017 – Brazil
- Stenoterommata luederwaldti (Mello-Leitão, 1923) – Brazil
- Stenoterommata maculata (Bertkau, 1880) – Brazil
- Stenoterommata melloleitaoi Guadanucci & Indicatti, 2004 – Brazil
- Stenoterommata neodiplornata Ghirotto & Indicatti, 2021 – Brazil
- Stenoterommata palmar Goloboff, 1995 – Brazil, Argentina
- Stenoterommata pavesii Indicatti, Chavari, Zucatelli-Júnior, Lucas & Brescovit, 2017 – Brazil
- Stenoterommata peri Indicatti, Chavari, Zucatelli-Júnior, Lucas & Brescovit, 2017 – Brazil
- Stenoterommata pescador Indicatti, Chavari, Zucatelli-Júnior, Lucas & Brescovit, 2017 – Brazil
- Stenoterommata platensis Holmberg, 1881 (type) – Argentina
- Stenoterommata quena Goloboff, 1995 – Argentina
- Stenoterommata sevegnaniae Indicatti, Chavari, Zucatelli-Júnior, Lucas & Brescovit, 2017 – Brazil
- Stenoterommata tenuistyla Goloboff, 1995 – Argentina
- Stenoterommata uruguai Goloboff, 1995 – Argentina

Formerly included:

- S. gounellei Simon, 1886 (Transferred to Acanthogonatus)
- S. guttulata Simon, 1886 (Transferred to Acanthogonatus)
- S. segne Simon, 1886 (Transferred to Acanthogonatus)
