= Stenoterommata quena =

Scientific classification
- Kingdom: Animalia
- Phylum: Arthropoda
- Subphylum: Chelicerata
- Class: Arachnida
- Order: Araneae
- Infraorder: Mygalomorphae
- Family: Pycnothelidae
- Genus: Stenoterommata
- Species: S. quena

Binomial name
- Stenoterommata quena Goloboff, 1995

Species of spider

Stenoterommata quena is a species of mygalomorph spiders of Argentina, named after its type locality: La Quena, Salta Province. Females are recognized by the numerous (7 or more) spines on prolateral patella III. The rastellum is stronger, and the maxillae are shorter, than in other species of its genus. The presence of preening combs in metatarsi I is also unusual.

== Description ==
- Female: total length 12.2 millimetres (0.48 in); cephalothorax length 4.55 millimetres (0.179 in), width 2.55 millimetres (0.100 in); cephalic region length 2.97 millimetres (0.117 in), width 3.15 millimetres (0.124 in); fovea width 0.75 millimetres (0.030 in); labium length 0.50 millimetres (0.020 in), width 0.95 millimetres (0.037 in); sternum length 2.55 millimetres (0.100 in), width 1.97 millimetres (0.078 in). Its cephalic region is convex with fovea procurved. The labium has no cuspules. Its maxillae are rather short, and serrula are absent. Its sternal sigilla is shallowand submarginal; it has a rebordered sternum. Chelicerae: rastellum strong, formed by thick blunt setae. Its cephalothorax, legs and palpi reddish brown; abdomen yellowish with brown chevron.

== Distribution ==
They are found in a thorn forest habitat in northeastern Salta Province, Argentina. Specimens were collected from burrows similar to those of other species in the genus, with an open entrance lined with a dense layer of silk.

== See also ==
- Spider anatomy
- Iguazú National Park
