= Stenoterommata tenuistyla =

Scientific classification
- Kingdom: Animalia
- Phylum: Arthropoda
- Subphylum: Chelicerata
- Class: Arachnida
- Order: Araneae
- Infraorder: Mygalomorphae
- Family: Pycnothelidae
- Genus: Stenoterommata
- Species: S. tenuistyla

Binomial name
- Stenoterommata tenuistyla Goloboff, 1995

Species of spider

Stenoterommata tenuistyla is a species of mygalomorph spiders of Argentina, named after the thin, slender embolus in males of this species, which distinguish it from males of the sympatric S. crassistyla. Females are distinguished from other three-clawed Stenoterommata by their spermathecae, which have a short basal portion and a single receptaculum arising from near the tip of the base. Males are diagnosed by one of the species autapomorphies: the presence of numerous short spines on the ventral metatarsus I.

== Description ==
- Male: total length 11.5 millimetres (0.45 in); cephalothorax length 3.97 millimetres (0.156 in), width 3.37 millimetres (0.133 in); cephalic region length 2.57 millimetres (0.101 in), width 2 millimetres (0.079 in); labium length 0.35 millimetres (0.014 in), width 0.72 millimetres (0.028 in); sternum length 2.17 millimetres (0.085 in), width 1.85 millimetres (0.073 in). Its labium has no cuspules and serrula are not visible. Its sternal sigilla are small, oval and shallow with its sternum slightly rebordered. Chelicerae: rastellum absent (only weak, attenuate setae). Cheliceral tumescence is present and flat, with the lower half covered with setae. Cephalothorax, legs and palpi are a yellowish-reddish-brown colour; abdomen yellow, with brown chevron.
- Female: total length 13.7 millimetres (0.54 in); cephalothorax length 4.75 millimetres (0.187 in), width 3.6 millimetres (0.14 in); cephalic region length 3.15 millimetres (0.124 in), width 2.55 millimetres (0.100 in); fovea width 0.62 millimetres (0.024 in); labium length 0.46 millimetres (0.018 in), width 0.92 millimetres (0.036 in); sternum length 2.72 millimetres (0.107 in), width 2.12 millimetres (0.083 in). Its cephalic region is convex, with fovea procurved. Its labium possesses 4 cuspules and no serrula is visible. Its sternal sigilla is small and shallow. Chelicerae: rastellum formed by attenuate setae. Colour as in the male.

== Distribution ==
This species is found in the Entre Ríos and northern Buenos Aires Provinces.

== Behaviour ==
S. tenuistyla lives in short, branched burrows, lined with a dense layer of silk. The burrows are constructed under rocks or logs, between roots, or in open spaces. In Buenos Aires they have been found in the banks of the Rio Parana, along a stretch of 50 km; north of there, they appear to be replaced by S. crassistyla. In Entre Rios they have been found in mounds around trees. During daytime, the burrows had their entrances closed with silk and debris and were not directly visible.

== See also ==
- Spider anatomy
- Iguazú National Park
