= Stenoterommata iguazu =

Scientific classification
- Kingdom: Animalia
- Phylum: Arthropoda
- Subphylum: Chelicerata
- Class: Arachnida
- Order: Araneae
- Infraorder: Mygalomorphae
- Family: Pycnothelidae
- Genus: Stenoterommata
- Species: S. iguazu

Binomial name
- Stenoterommata iguazu Goloboff, 1995

Species of spider

Stenoterommata iguazu is a species of mygalomorph spiders of Argentina, named after its type locality: Iguazú, Misiones. Females are distinguished from other species in the genus, except S. platense, by the 2 + 2 spermathecae; from S. platense, they are distinguished by the outer spermathecal lobe having a single receptaculum. Males are distinguished from other species, except S. platense, by having a thin, well-sclerotized embolus and the bulbal duct with an even curvature; from S. platense, by the sudden tapering apical portion of the bulbal duct and the slightly smaller size.

== Description ==
- Male: total length 8.2 millimetres (0.32 in); cephalothorax length 3.8 millimetres (0.15 in), width 2.75 millimetres (0.108 in); cephalic region length 2.32 millimetres (0.091 in), width 1.75 millimetres (0.069 in). Labium length 0.31 millimetres (0.012 in), width 0.57 millimetres (0.022 in). Sternum length 2.02 millimetres (0.080 in), width 1.61 millimetres (0.063 in). Its labium has no cuspules. Its sternal sigilla are small, oval and shallow; its sternum with a clear reborder. Chelicerae: rastellum with only long, thin and attenuate setae. Cheliceral tumescence is present, covered with hairs.
- Female: total length 13.25 millimetres (0.522 in); cephalothorax length 4.65 millimetres (0.183 in), width 3.55 millimetres (0.140 in); cephalic region length 3.25 millimetres (0.128 in), width 2.67 millimetres (0.105 in); fovea width 0.65 millimetres (0.026 in); labium length 0.44 millimetres (0.017 in), width 0.90 millimetres (0.035 in); sternum length 2.63 millimetres (0.104 in), width 2.25 millimetres (0.089 in). Its cephalic region is convex with the fovea slightly procurved. The labia have 3 cuspules. Its sternal sigilla are small, oval, shallow and marginal; sternum is rebordered. Chelicerae: rastellum formed by thick setae; colour similar to S. Platense.

== Distribution ==
Northern Misiones Province, Argentina.

== See also ==
- Spider anatomy
- Iguazú National Park
