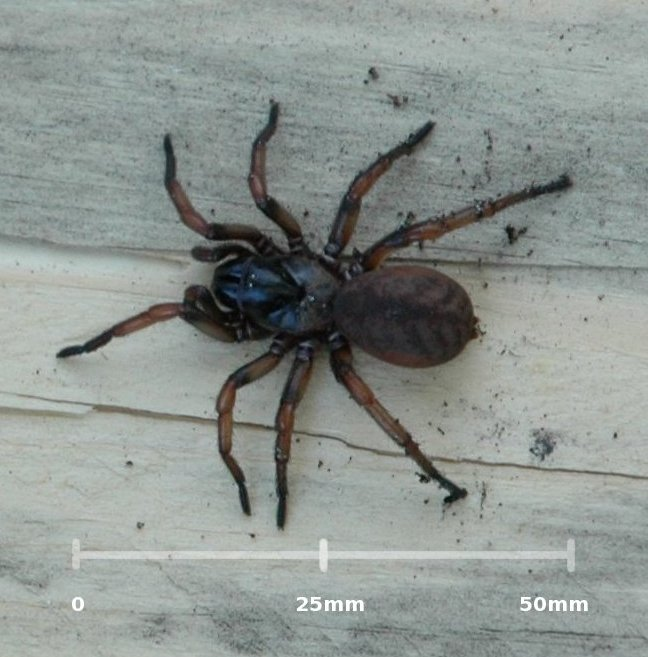
- Melbourne trapdoor spider (Stanwellia grisea)
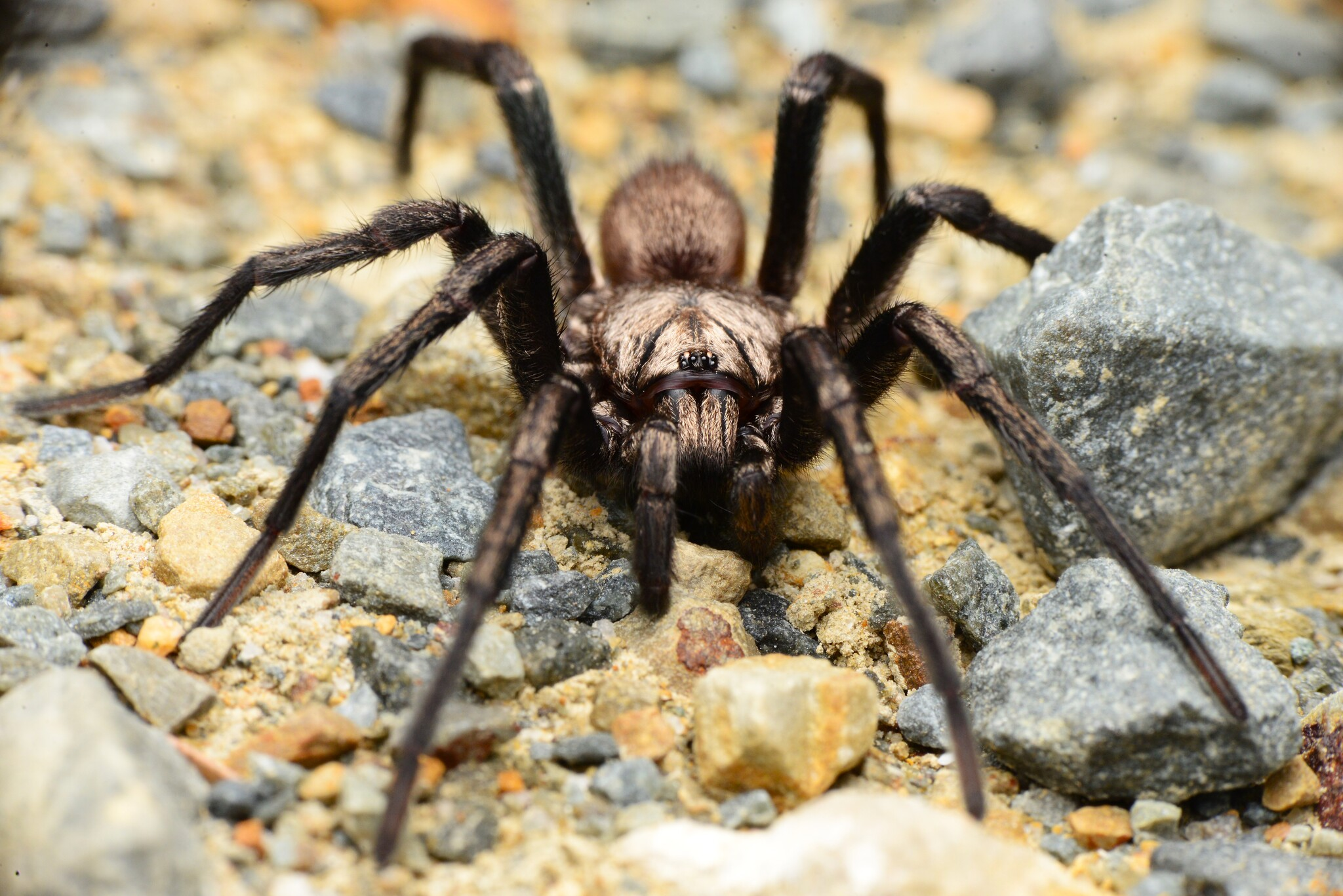
- S. grisea

Scientific classification
- Kingdom: Animalia
- Phylum: Arthropoda
- Subphylum: Chelicerata
- Class: Arachnida
- Order: Araneae
- Infraorder: Mygalomorphae
- Family: Pycnothelidae
- Genus: Stanwellia; Rainbow & Pulleine, 1918

Type species
- S. hoggi (Rainbow, 1914)

Species
- 18, see text

Synonyms
- Aparua Todd, 1945

= Stanwellia =

Genus of spiders

Stanwellia is a genus of South Pacific mygalomorph spiders in the family Pycnothelidae. It was first described by W. J. Rainbow & R. H. Pulleine in 1918. Originally placed with the curtain-web spiders, it was transferred to the funnel-web trapdoor spiders in 1985, then to the Pycnothelidae in 2020. It is a senior synonym of Aparua.

== Species ==
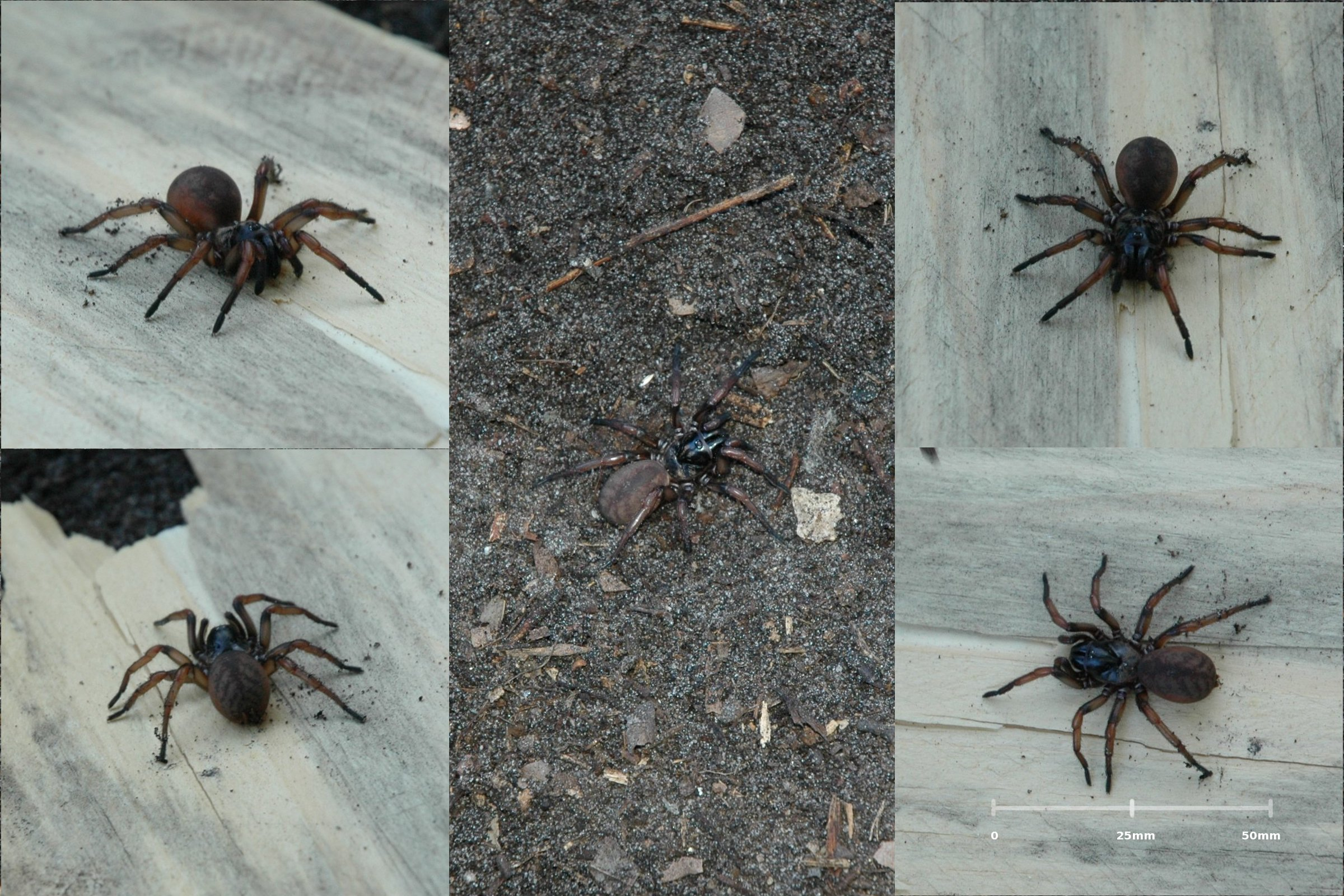
Melbourne Trapdoor Spider: Composite image of same spider from various angles. Center image as seen in natural surroundings (sandy loam soil). Location: found in moist soil at Carnegie, Melbourne, Victoria, Australia.

As of June 2020 the genus contained eighteen species, found in New Zealand (NZ) and the Australian states of New South Wales (NSW), Victoria (VIC), South Australia (SA) and Tasmania (TAS):

- Stanwellia annulipes (C. L. Koch, 1841) – TAS
- Stanwellia bipectinata (Todd, 1945) – NZ
- Stanwellia grisea (Hogg, 1901) – VIC
- Stanwellia hapua (Forster, 1968) – NZ
- Stanwellia hoggi (Rainbow, 1914) (type) – NSW
- Stanwellia hollowayi (Forster, 1968) – NZ
- Stanwellia houhora (Forster, 1968) – NZ
- Stanwellia inornata Main, 1972 – VIC
- Stanwellia kaituna (Forster, 1968) – NZ
- Stanwellia media (Forster, 1968) – NZ
- Stanwellia minor (Kulczyński, 1908) – NSW
- Stanwellia nebulosa (Rainbow & Pulleine, 1918) – SA
- Stanwellia occidentalis Main, 1972 – SA
- Stanwellia pexa (Hickman, 1930) – TAS
- Stanwellia puna (Forster, 1968) – NZ
- Stanwellia regia (Forster, 1968) – NZ
- Stanwellia taranga (Forster, 1968) – NZ
- Stanwellia tuna (Forster, 1968) – NZ
