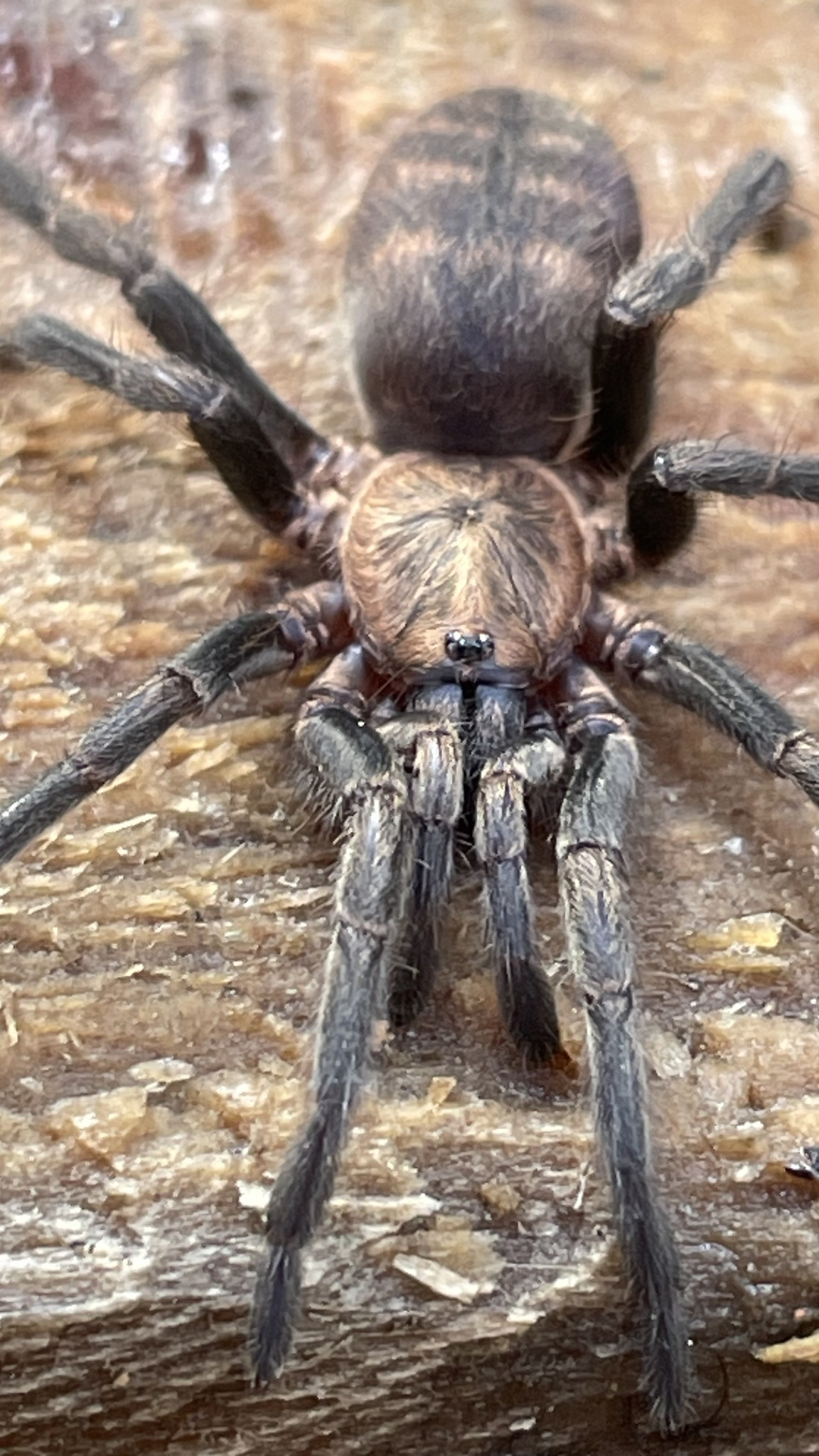
- Acanthogonatus pissii

Scientific classification
- Kingdom: Animalia
- Phylum: Arthropoda
- Subphylum: Chelicerata
- Class: Arachnida
- Order: Araneae
- Infraorder: Mygalomorphae
- Clade: Avicularioidea
- Family: Pycnothelidae; Chamberlin, 1917

Diversity
- 15 genera, 144 species
- blue: reported countries (WSC) green: observation hotspots (iNaturalist)

= Pycnothelidae =

Family of spiders

Pycnothelidae is a family of mygalomorph spiders first described in 1917. It was downgraded to a subfamily of the funnel-web trapdoor spiders in 1985, but returned to family status in 2020.

== Distribution ==
The majority of genera are found in South America, with two genera from East and southern Africa.

== Genera ==
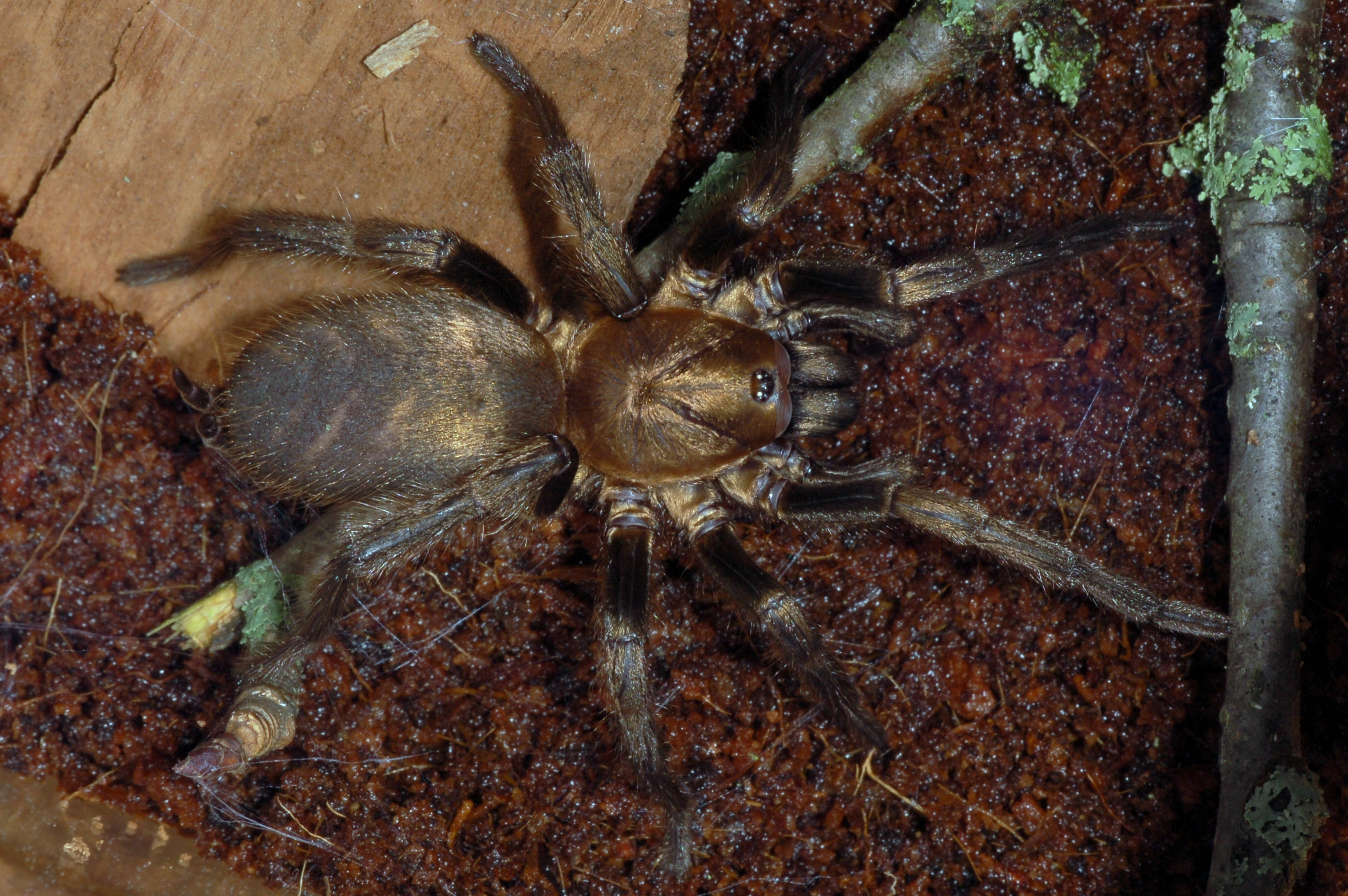
captive Acanthognatus francki

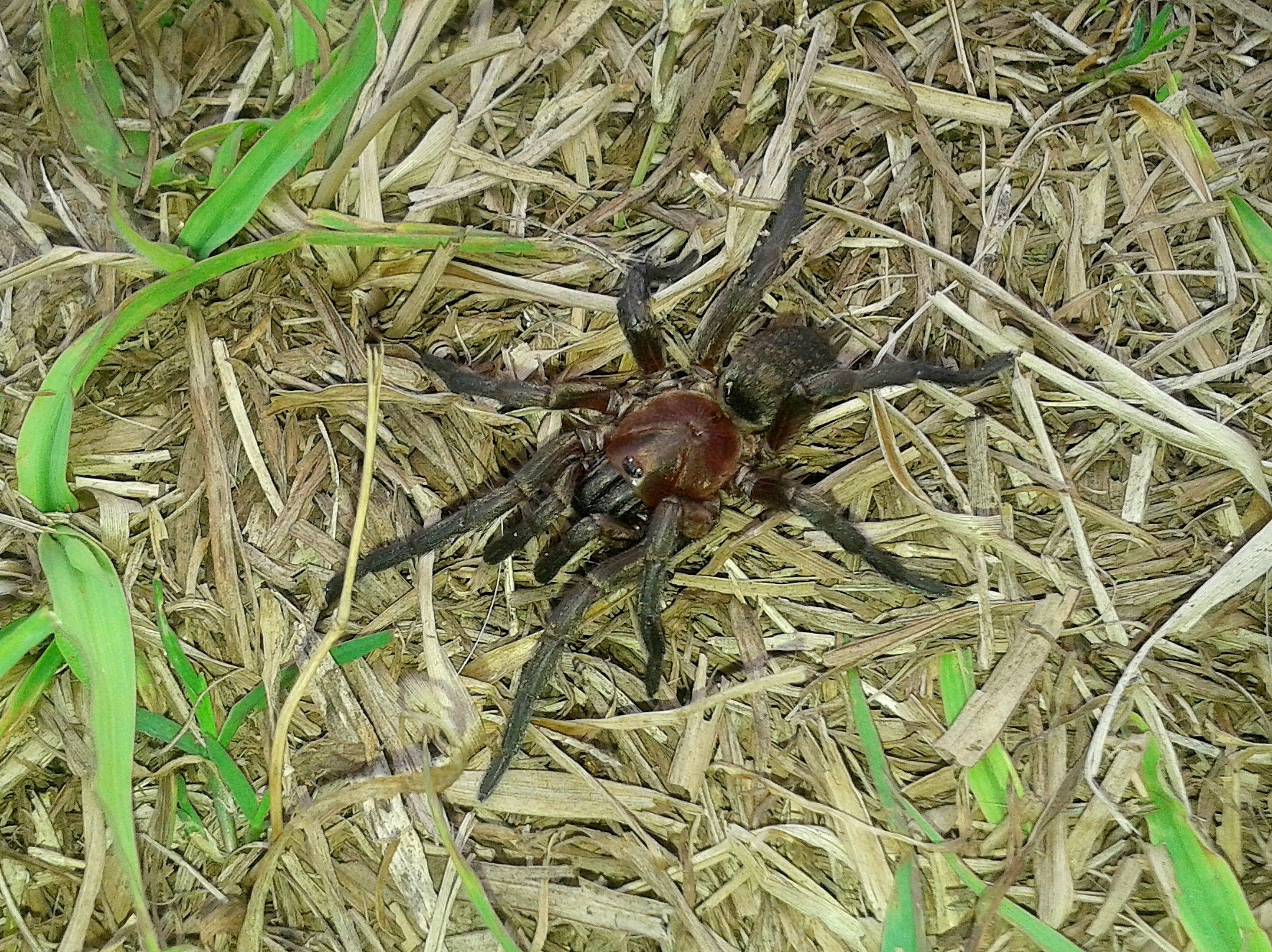
Pycnothele rubra from Brazil

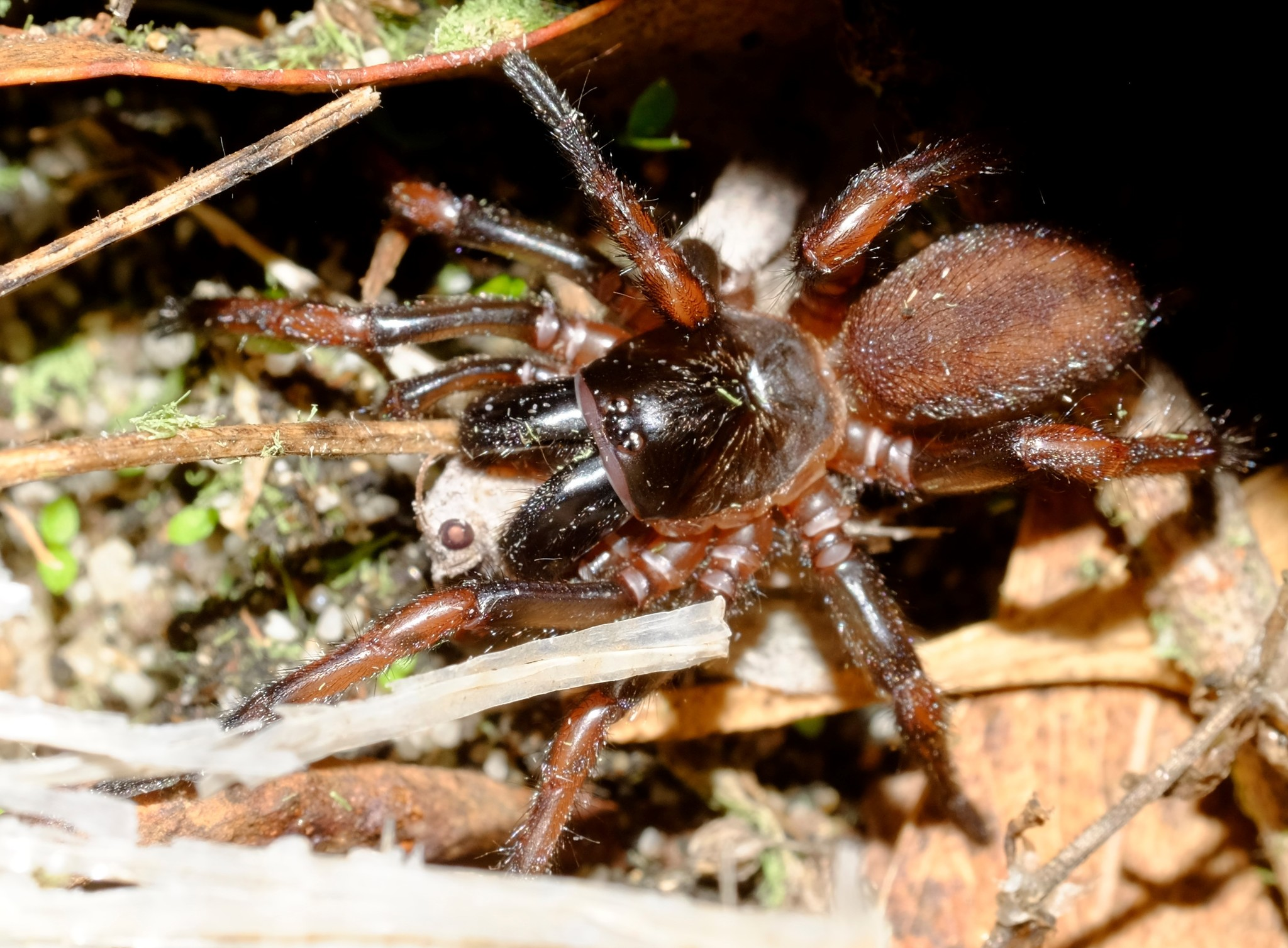
Stanwellia sp. from Australia

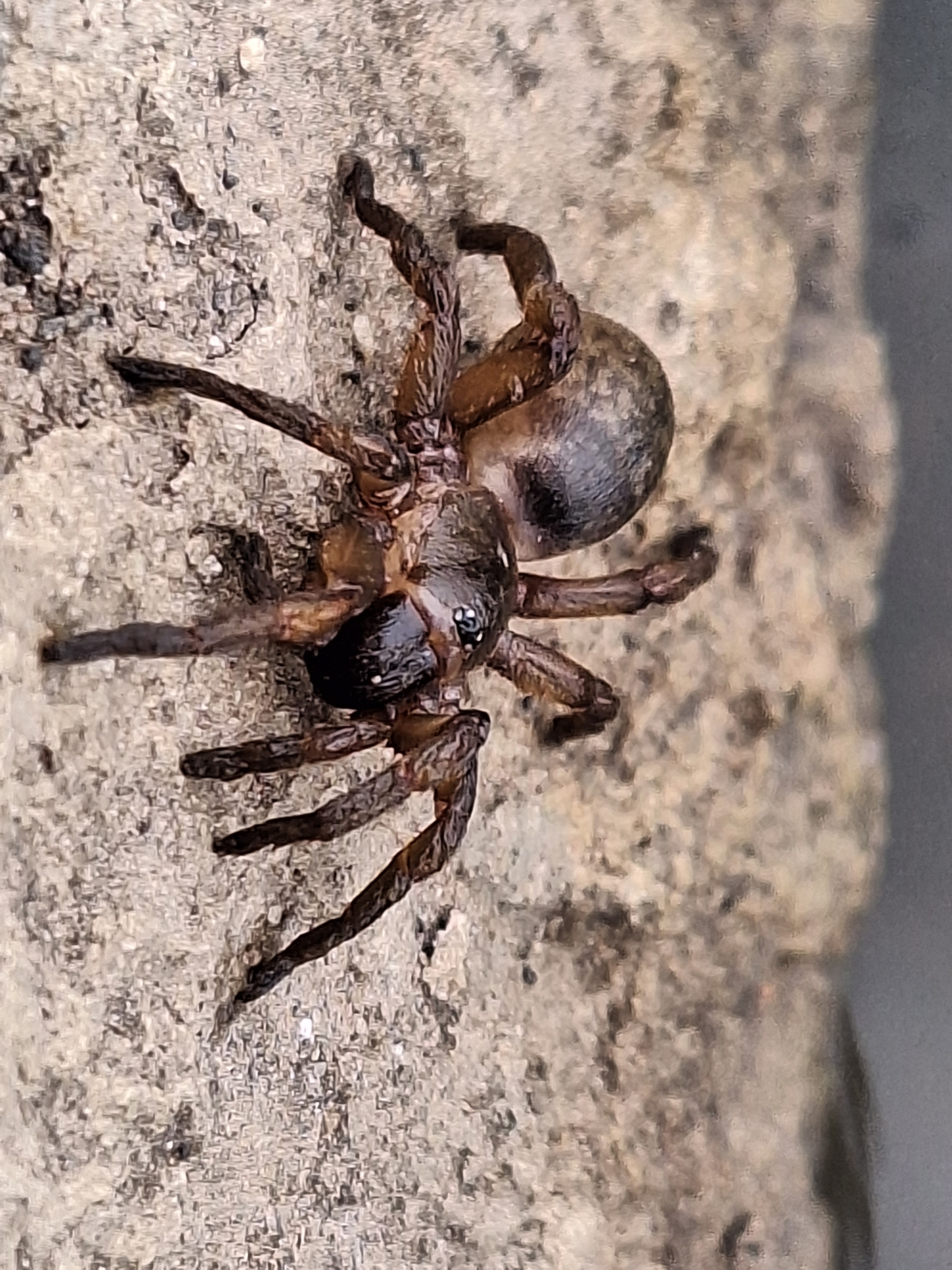
S. platensis

As of January 2026, this family includes fifteen genera and 144 species.

South American genera:

- Acanthogonatus Karsch, 1880 – Argentina, Brazil, Chile, Peru, Uruguay
- Chaco Tullgren, 1905 – Argentina, Brazil, Chile, Uruguay
- Chilelopsis Goloboff, 1995 – Chile
- Longistylus Indicatti & Lucas, 2005 – Brazil
- Lycinus Thorell, 1894 – Argentina, Brazil, Chile
- Prorachias Mello-Leitão, 1924 – Brazil
- Psalistopoides Mello-Leitão, 1934 – Brazil
- Pselligmus Simon, 1892 – Brazil
- Pycnothele Chamberlin, 1917 – Argentina, Brazil, Uruguay
- Rachias Simon, 1892 – Argentina, Brazil
- Stanwellia Rainbow & Pulleine, 1918 – Australia, New Zealand
- Stenoterommata Holmberg, 1881 – Argentina, Brazil, Uruguay
- Xenonemesia Goloboff, 1989 – Argentina, Brazil, Uruguay

African genera:

- Afromygale Zonstein, 2020 – Kenya, Tanzania
- Pionothele Purcell, 1902 – South Africa, Namibia
