= List of Nemesiidae species =

This page lists all described species of the spider family Nemesiidae accepted by the World Spider Catalog as of May 2025:

== A ==
=== Amblyocarenum ===
Amblyocarenum Simon, 1892

- A. doleschalli (Ausserer, 1871) — Italy (mainland, Sicily)
- A. nuragicum Decae, Colombo & Manunza, 2014 — Italy (Sardinia)
- A. obscurum (Ausserer, 1871) — Italy (Sicily)
- A. walckenaeri (Lucas, 1846) (type) — Mediterranean

== B ==
=== Brachythele ===
Brachythele Ausserer, 1871

- Brachythele bentzieni Zonstein, 2007 — Greece
- Brachythele denieri (Simon, 1916) — Greece, Bulgaria
- Brachythele icterica (C. L. Koch, 1838) (type) — Italy, Croatia, North Macedonia
- Brachythele incerta Ausserer, 1871 — Cyprus
- Brachythele langourovi Lazarov, 2005 — Bulgaria
- Brachythele media Kulczyński, 1897 — Slovenia, Croatia, Albania
- Brachythele rhodopensis (Dimitrov & Zonstein, 2022) — Bulgaria
- Brachythele speculatrix Kulczyński, 1897 — SE Europe (Balkans)
- Brachythele varrialei (Dalmas, 1920) — Eastern Europe
- Brachythele zonsteini (Özkütük, Yağmur, Elverici, Gücel, Altunsoy & Kunt, 2022) — Turkey

== C ==
=== Calisoga ===
Calisoga

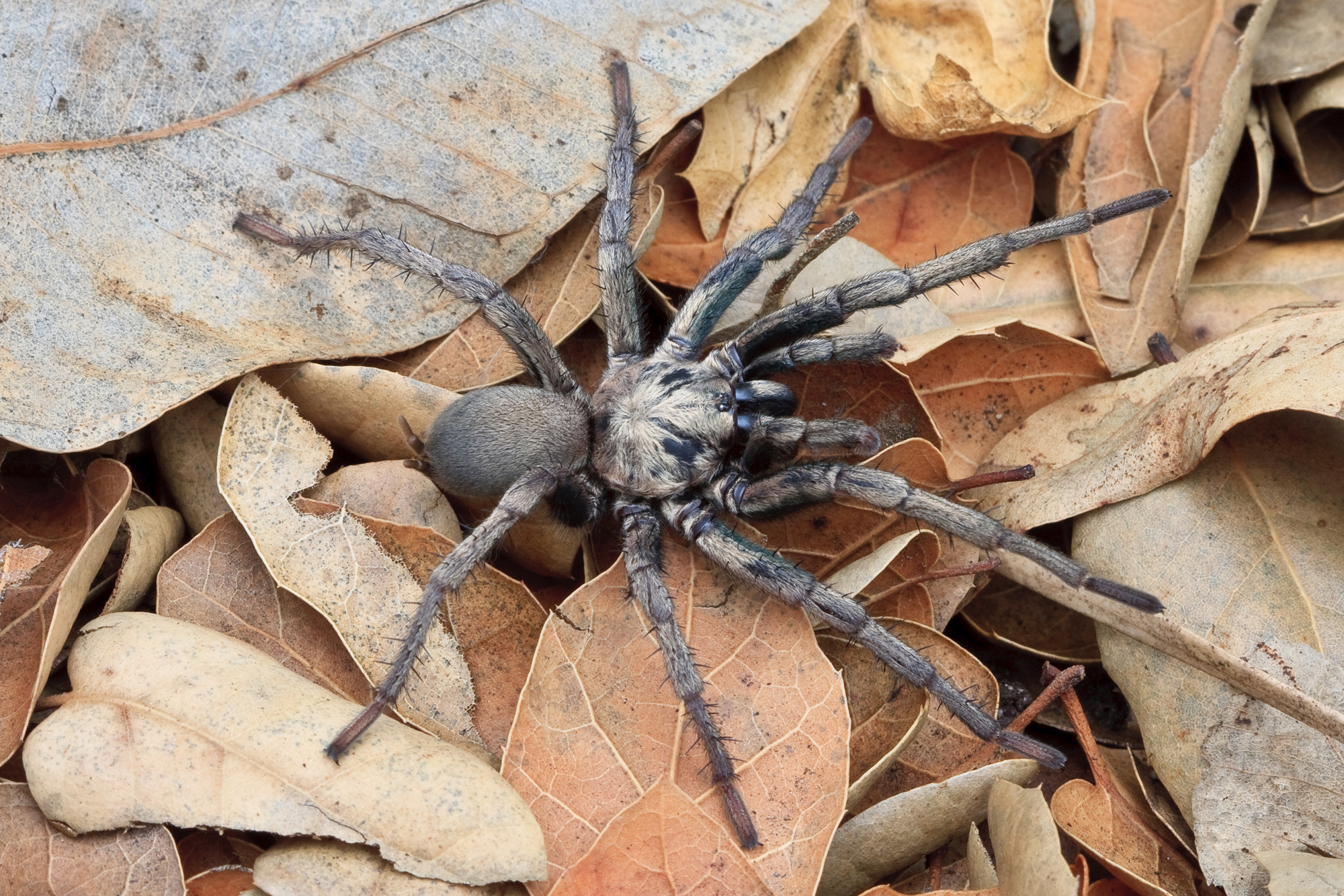
Calisoga longitarsis, male

Calisoga Chamberlin, 1937

- C. anomala (Schenkel, 1950) — USA
- C. centronetha (Chamberlin & Ivie, 1939) — USA
- C. longitarsis (Simon, 1891) — USA
- C. sacra Chamberlin, 1937 (type) — USA
- C. theveneti (Simon, 1891) — USA

== D ==
=== Damarchilus ===
Damarchilus Siliwal, Molur & Raven, 2015

- Damarchilus nigricus Siliwal, Molur & Raven, 2015 (type) — India
- Damarchilus rufus Siliwal, Molur & Raven, 2015 — India

== E ==
=== † Eodiplurina ===
† Eodiplurina Petrunkevitch, 1922

- † E. cockerelli Petrunkevitch, 1922

== G ==
=== Gravelyia ===
Gravelyia Mirza & Mondal, 2018

- Gravelyia boro (Basumatary & Brahma, 2021) — India
- Gravelyia excavatus (Gravely, 1921) (type) — India
- Gravelyia striatus Mirza & Mondal, 2018 — India

== I ==
=== Iberesia ===
Iberesia Decae & Cardoso, 2006

- I. arturica Calvo, 2020 — Spain
- I. barbara (Lucas, 1846) — Morocco, Algeria, Spain
- I. brauni (L. Koch, 1882) — Spain (incl. Balearic Is.)
- I. castillana (Frade & Bacelar, 1931) — Spain
- I. machadoi Decae & Cardoso, 2006 (type) — Portugal, Spain
- I. valdemoriana Luis de la Iglesia, 2019 — Spain

== M ==
=== Mexentypesa ===
Mexentypesa Raven, 1987

- M. chiapas Raven, 1987 (type) — Mexico

== N ==
=== Nemesia ===
Nemesia

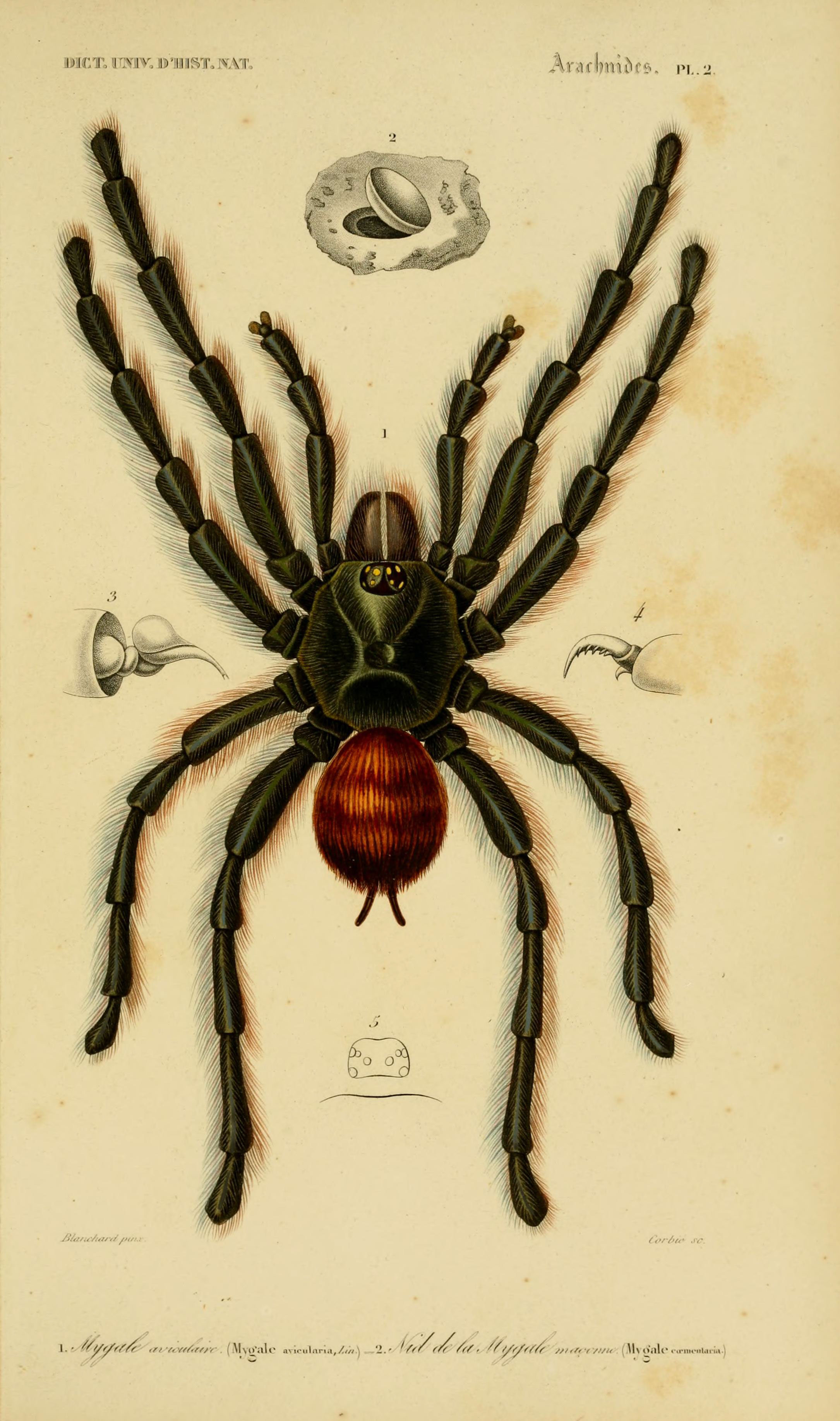
Nemesia caementaria

Nemesia Audouin, 1826

- N. africana (C. L. Koch, 1838) — Algeria
- N. albicomis Simon, 1914 — France (Corsica)
- N. algerina Zonstein, 2019 — Algeria
- N. almoravida Zonstein, 2019 — Algeria
- N. amicitia (Pertegal & Molero-Baltanás, 2022) — Spain
- N. angustata Simon, 1873 — Spain
- N. annaba Zonstein, 2019 — Algeria
- N. apenninica Decae, Pantini & Isaia, 2015 — Italy
- N. arboricola Pocock, 1903 — Malta
- N. arenicola Simon, 1892 — France (Corsica)
- N. asterix Decae & Huber, 2017 — Italy (Sardinia)
- N. athiasi Franganillo, 1920 — Portugal, Spain
- N. bacelarae Decae, Cardoso & Selden, 2007 — Portugal, Spain
- N. berlandi Frade & Bacelar, 1931 — Portugal
- N. bristowei Decae, 2005 — Spain (Majorca)
- N. budensis Kolosváry, 1939 — Hungary
- N. caementaria (Latreille, 1799) — Southern Europe
- N. caranhaci Decae, 1995 — Greece (Crete)
- N. carminans (Latreille, 1818) — France
- N. cecconii Kulczyński, 1907 — Italy
- N. cellicola Audouin, 1826 (type) — Mediterranean
- N. coheni Fuhn & Polenec, 1967 — Romania, Bulgaria
- N. cominensis (Cassar, Mifsud & Decae, 2022) — Malta
- N. congener O. Pickard-Cambridge, 1874 — France
- N. corsica Simon, 1914 — France (Corsica)
- N. crassimana Simon, 1873 — Spain
- N. cubana (Franganillo, 1930) — Cuba
- N. cypriatica (Özkütük, Yağmur, Elverici, Gücel, Altunsoy & Kunt, 2022) — Cyprus
- N. daedali Decae, 1995 — Greece (Crete)
- N. decaei Zonstein, 2019 — Algeria
- N. didieri Simon, 1892 — Algeria
- N. dido Zonstein, 2019 — Algeria
- N. dorthesi Thorell, 1875 — Spain, Morocco, Algeria
- N. dubia (Karsch, 1878) — Mozambique
- N. dubia O. Pickard-Cambridge, 1874 — Spain, France
- N. eleanora O. Pickard-Cambridge, 1873 — France
- N. entinae (Calvo & Pagán, 2022) — Spain
- N. fagei Frade & Bacelar, 1931 — Portugal
- N. fertoni Simon, 1914 — France (Corsica), Italy (Sardinia)
  - N. f. sardinea Simon, 1914 — Italy (Sardinia)
- N. hastensis Decae, Pantini & Isaia, 2015 — Italy
- N. hispanica L. Koch, 1871 — Spain
- N. ibiza Decae, 2005 — Spain (Ibiza)
- N. ilvae Caporiacco, 1950 — Italy
- N. incerta O. Pickard-Cambridge, 1874 — France
- N. kahmanni Kraus, 1955 — Italy (Sardinia)
- N. macrocephala Ausserer, 1871 — Italy (Sicily), Malta, Algeria?
  - N. m. occidentalis Frade & Bacelar, 1931 — Spain
- N. maculatipes Ausserer, 1871 — France (Corsica), Italy (Sardinia), Morocco?
- N. maltensis (Cassar, Mifsud & Decae, 2022) — Malta
- N. manderstjernae L. Koch, 1871 — France
- N. meridionalis (Costa, 1835) — Spain, France, Italy, Algeria?
- N. pannonica Herman, 1879 — Eastern Europe
- N. pavani Dresco, 1978 — Italy
- N. pedemontana Decae, Pantini & Isaia, 2015 — Italy
- N. qarthadasht (Calvo, 2021) — Spain
- N. randa Decae, 2005 — Spain (Majorca)
- N. raripila Simon, 1914 — Spain, France
- N. rastellata Wunderlich, 2011 — Greece (Karpathos)
- N. santeugenia Decae, 2005 — Spain (Majorca)
- N. santeulalia Decae, 2005 — Spain (Ibiza)
- N. sanzoi Fage, 1917 — Italy (Sicily)
- N. seldeni Decae, 2005 — Spain (Majorca)
- N. shenlongi (Pertegal, García, Molero-Baltanás & Knapp, 2022) — Spain
- N. simoni O. Pickard-Cambridge, 1874 — Portugal, Spain, France
- N. sinensis Pocock, 1901 — China
- N. tanit Zonstein, 2019 — Algeria
- N. transalpina (Doleschall, 1871) — Italy
- N. uncinata Bacelar, 1933 — Portugal, Spain
- N. ungoliant Decae, Cardoso & Selden, 2007 — Portugal
- N. valenciae Kraus, 1955 — Spain, Morocco

== R ==
=== Raveniola ===
Raveniola

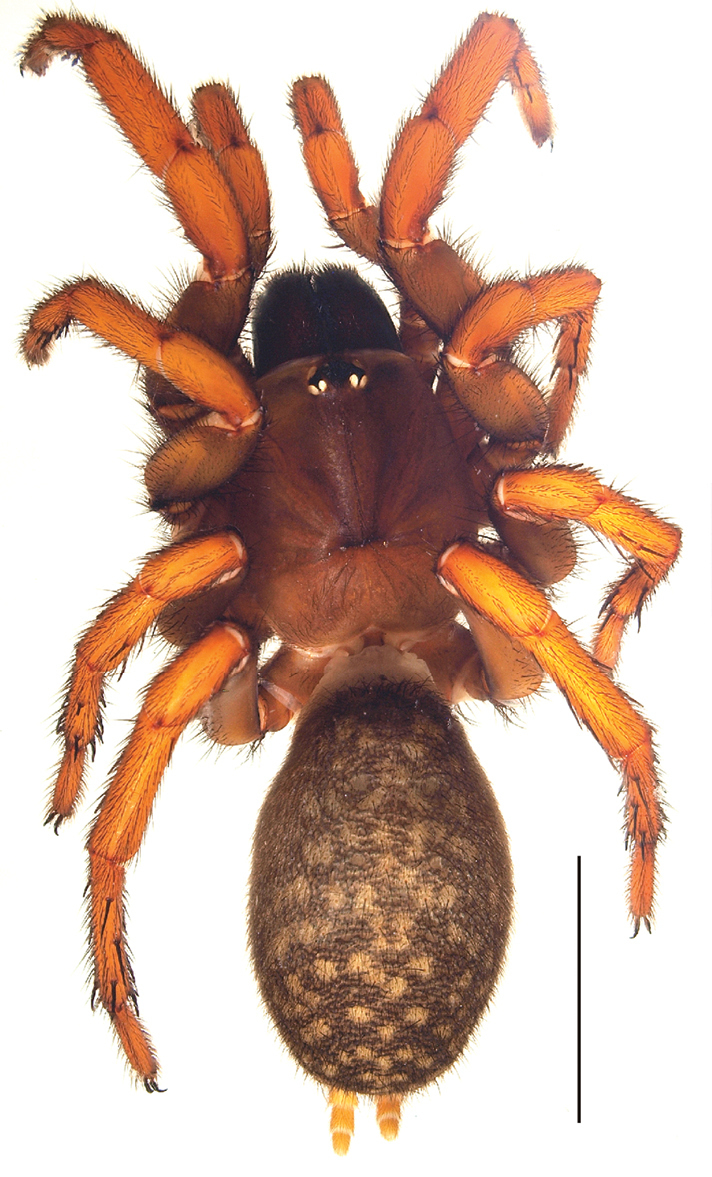
Raveniola chayi, female

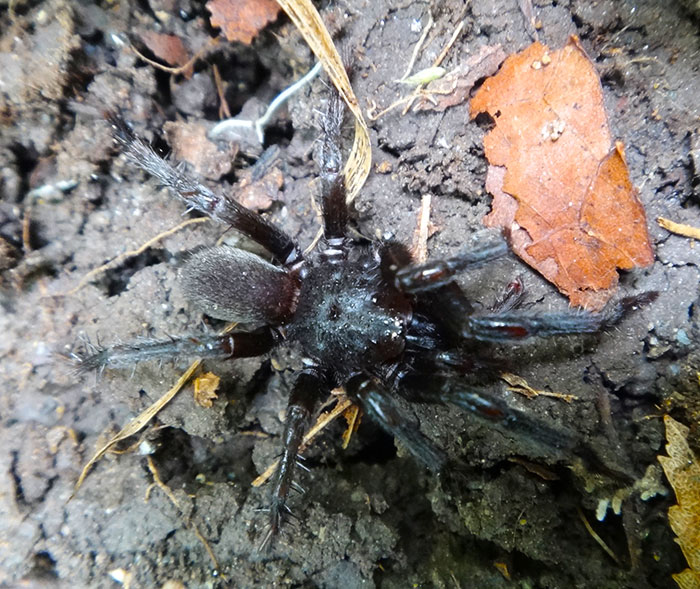
Raveniola mazandaranica

Raveniola Zonstein, 1987

- Raveniola adjarica Zonstein, Kunt & Yağmur, 2018 — Georgia
- Raveniola alpina Li & Zonstein, 2015 — China
- Raveniola ambardzumyani Marusik & Zonstein, 2021 — Armenia
- Raveniola anadolu Zonstein, Kunt & Yağmur, 2018 — Turkey
- Raveniola arthuri Kunt & Yağmur, 2010 — Turkey
- Raveniola beelzebub Lin & Li, 2020 — China
- Raveniola bellula Li & Zonstein, 2015 — China
- Raveniola birecikensis Zonstein, Kunt & Yağmur, 2018 — Turkey
- Raveniola caudata Zonstein, 2009 — Tajikistan
- Raveniola chayi Li & Zonstein, 2015 — China
- Raveniola concolor Zonstein, 2000 — Pakistan
- Raveniola dunini Zonstein, Kunt & Yağmur, 2018 — Armenia, Azerbaijan, Iran
- Raveniola fedotovi (Charitonov, 1946) — Central Asia
- Raveniola ferghanensis (Zonstein, 1984) — Kyrgyzstan
- Raveniola gracilis Li & Zonstein, 2015 — China
- Raveniola guangxi (Raven & Schwendinger, 1995) — China
- Raveniola hebeinica Zhu, Zhang & Zhang, 1999 — China
- Raveniola hyrcanica Dunin, 1988 — Azerbaijan
- Raveniola jundai (Lin & Li, 2022) — China
- Raveniola kopetdaghensis (Fet, 1984) — Turkmenistan
- Raveniola lamia Yu & Zhang, 2021 — China
- Raveniola marusiki Zonstein, Kunt & Yağmur, 2018 — Iran
- Raveniola mazandaranica Marusik, Zamani & Mirshamsi, 2014 — Iran
- Raveniola micropa (Ausserer, 1871) — Turkey
- Raveniola mikhailovi Zonstein, 2021 — Kyrgyzstan
- Raveniola montana Zonstein & Marusik, 2012 — China
- Raveniola nana Zonstein, Kunt & Yağmur, 2018 — Turkey
- Raveniola niedermeyeri (Brignoli, 1972) — Iran
- Raveniola pontica (Spassky, 1937) — Russia (Caucasus), Georgia
- Raveniola redikorzevi (Spassky, 1937) — Turkmenistan
- Raveniola rugosa Li & Zonstein, 2015 — China
- Raveniola shangrila Zonstein & Marusik, 2012 — China
- Raveniola sinani Zonstein, Kunt & Yağmur, 2018 — Turkey
- Raveniola songi Zonstein & Marusik, 2012 — China
- Raveniola spirula Li & Zonstein, 2015 — China
- Raveniola turcica Zonstein, Kunt & Yağmur, 2018 — Turkey
- Raveniola virgata (Simon, 1891) (type) — Central Asia
- Raveniola vonwicki Zonstein, 2000 — Iran
- Raveniola xizangensiss (Hu & Li, 1987) — China
- Raveniola yajiangensis Li & Zonstein, 2015 — China
- Raveniola yangren (Lin & Li, 2022) — China
- Raveniola yunnanensis Zonstein & Marusik, 2012 — China
- Raveniola zaitzevi (Charitonov, 1948) — Azerbaijan, Georgia

== S ==
=== Sinopesa ===
Sinopesa Raven & Schwendinger, 1995

- Sinopesa chengbuensis (Xu & Yin, 2002) — China
- Sinopesa chinensis (Kulczyński, 1901) — China
- Sinopesa gollum Lin & Li, 2021 — China
- Sinopesa guansheng Lin & Li, 2023 — China
- Sinopesa kumensis Shimojana & Haupt, 2000 — Japan (Ryukyu Is.)
- Sinopesa maculata Raven & Schwendinger, 1995 — Thailand
- Sinopesa ninhbinhensis Li & Zonstein, 2015 — Vietnam
- Sinopesa sinensis (Zhu & Mao, 1983) — China
