= List of Entypesidae species =

This page lists all described species of the spider family Entypesidae accepted by the World Spider Catalog as of December 2020:

== Entypesa ==
Entypesa Simon, 1902

- E. andohahela Zonstein, 2018 — Madagascar
- E. enakara Zonstein, 2018 — Madagascar
- E. fisheri Zonstein, 2018 — Madagascar
- E. nebulosa Simon, 1902 (type) — Madagascar
- E. rastellata Zonstein, 2018 — Madagascar
- E. schoutedeni Benoit, 1965 — South Africa

== Hermacha ==
Hermacha Simon, 1889

- H. anomala (Bertkau, 1880) — Brazil
- H. bicolor (Pocock, 1897) — South Africa
- H. brevicauda Purcell, 1903 — South Africa
- H. capensis (Ausserer, 1871) — South Africa
- H. caudata Simon, 1889 (type) — Mozambique
- H. conspersa Mello-Leitão, 1941 — Colombia
- H. crudeni Hewitt, 1913 — South Africa
- H. curvipes Purcell, 1902 — South Africa
- H. evanescens Purcell, 1903 — South Africa
- H. fossor (Bertkau, 1880) — Brazil
- H. fulva Tucker, 1917 — South Africa
- H. grahami (Hewitt, 1915) — South Africa
- H. itatiayae Mello-Leitão, 1923 — Brazil
- H. lanata Purcell, 1902 — South Africa
- H. mazoena Hewitt, 1915 — South Africa
- H. nigra Tucker, 1917 — South Africa
- H. nigrispinosa Tucker, 1917 — South Africa
- H. purcelli (Simon, 1903) — South Africa
- H. sericea Purcell, 1902 — South Africa
- H. tuckeri Raven, 1985 — South Africa

== Lepthercus ==
Lepthercus Purcell, 1902

- L. confusus Ríos-Tamayo & Lyle, 2020 — South Africa
- L. dippenaarae Ríos-Tamayo & Lyle, 2020 — South Africa
- L. dregei Purcell, 1902 (type) — South Africa
- L. engelbrechti Ríos-Tamayo & Lyle, 2020 — South Africa
- L. filmeri Ríos-Tamayo & Lyle, 2020 — South Africa
- L. haddadi Ríos-Tamayo & Lyle, 2020 — South Africa
- L. kwazuluensis Ríos-Tamayo & Lyle, 2020 — South Africa
- L. lawrencei Ríos-Tamayo & Lyle, 2020 — South Africa
- L. mandelai Ríos-Tamayo & Lyle, 2020 — South Africa
- L. rattrayi Hewitt, 1917 — South Africa
- L. sofiae Ríos-Tamayo & Lyle, 2020 — South Africa
