= Nemesia =

Nemesia can be:

- Nemesia (plant), genus of plants in the family Scrophulariaceae
- Nemesia (spider), a genus of spiders in the family Nemesiidae
- Nemesia (moth), one of many synonyms for the genus Coleophora
