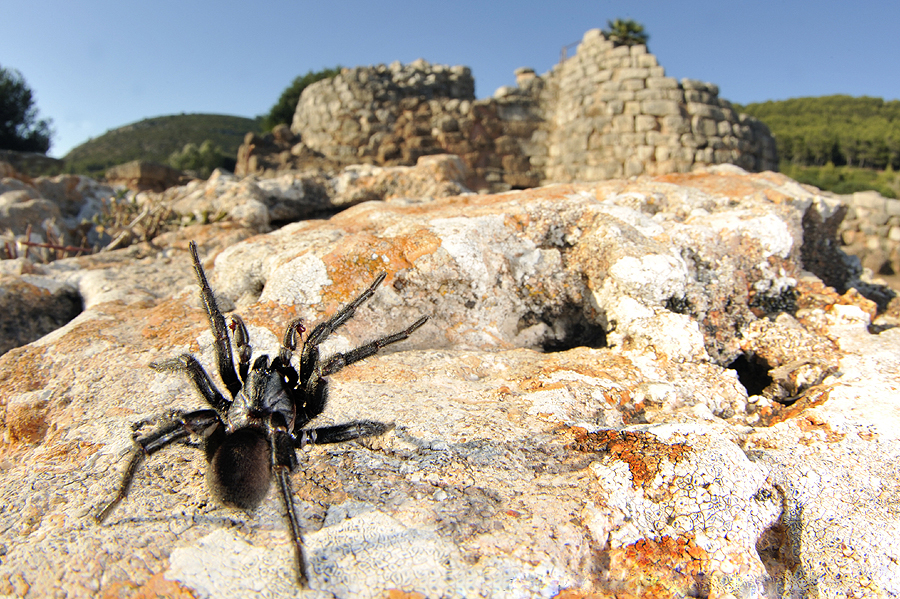

Scientific classification
- Kingdom: Animalia
- Phylum: Arthropoda
- Subphylum: Chelicerata
- Class: Arachnida
- Order: Araneae
- Infraorder: Mygalomorphae
- Family: Nemesiidae
- Genus: Amblyocarenum
- Species: A. nuragicus

Binomial name
- Amblyocarenum nuragicus Decae, Colombo & Manunza, 2014

= Amblyocarenum nuragicus =

Species of spider

Amblyocarenum nuragicus, or also Nuragic spider, is a spider in the family Nemesiidae. It is endemic to the Mediterranean island of Sardinia, where it is common to be found on the surface in the summer, and its body length ranges from 17 to 25 mm. The scientific name of the species pays homage to the indigenous Nuragic civilization.

After a study dating back to 2007, the Nuragic spider finally classified as a distinct species from others belonging to the genus Cyrtauchenius only in 2014. Further research on the peculiarities of this spider has led to the differentiation of the two genera Cyrtauchenius and Amblyocarenum that, until the aforementioned discovery, were considered to be actually the same. They are now placed in different families.

Albeit similar at first glance, this spider is not to be confused with the Cteniza sauvagesi spider, in that it is quite different from a taxonomical and morphological point of view.
