= Pionothele =

Scientific classification
- Kingdom: Animalia
- Phylum: Arthropoda
- Subphylum: Chelicerata
- Class: Arachnida
- Order: Araneae
- Infraorder: Mygalomorphae
- Family: Pycnothelidae
- Genus: Pionothele; Purcell, 1902

Type species
- P. straminea Purcell, 1902

Species
- Pionothele gobabeb Bond & Lamb, 2019; Pionothele straminea Purcell, 1902

Genus of spiders

Pionothele is a genus of mygalomorph spiders in the family Pycnothelidae. The two described species are endemic to southern Africa. It was first described by William Frederick Purcell in 1902.

Originally placed with the Ctenizidae, it was transferred to the funnel-web trapdoor spiders in 1985, then to the Pycnothelidae in 2020.

== Life style ==
All nominal species of Pionothele have been collected from dune ecosystems, coastal and desert environments.

== Description ==
The South African genus Pionothele Purcell, 1902 is a poorly known member of the family Pycnothelidae. Body size ranges from 8-14 mm. The carapace is oval to broad-oval and hirsute, with the cephalic region slightly to noticeably elevated over the thoracic part. The thoracic fovea is short, transverse, and more or less straight. There are eight eyes on a raised eye tubercle that are well defined and close to the clypeal edge. The labium lacks cuspules while the endites have few cuspules. The rastellum has moderately stout setae.

The abdomen is oval and spotted. The posterior spinnerets are stout with the apical segment domed. The tarsus IV is spined, the third claw on anterior legs is reduced, and the paired claws are long and biseriate. In males, leg I is medially swollen with a slender tibia. All nominal species of Pionothele have been collected from dune ecosystems, coastal and desert environments.

== Taxonomy ==
The genus was transferred from Ctenizidae to Nemesiidae by Raven (1985) and subsequently to Pycnothelidae by Opatova et al. (2020). In Zonstein's (2016) review of the genus, he redescribed and illustrated P. straminea Purcell, 1902 and described a second, new species P. capensis Zonstein, 2016. However, P. capensis was later synonymized with Hermacha brevicauda by Ríos-Tamayo, Engelbrecht & Goloboff in 2021, transferring it to the family Entypesidae. According to Bond and Lamb (2019), Pionothele may be more widespread and diverse than is currently known.

== Species ==
As of September 2025, this genus includes two species:

- Pionothele gobabeb Bond & Lamb, 2019 – Namibia
- Pionothele straminea Purcell, 1902 – South Africa (type species)

Pionothele capensis was found to be a synonym of Hermacha brevicauda in 2021.
