= Pycnothele =

Scientific classification
- Kingdom: Animalia
- Phylum: Arthropoda
- Subphylum: Chelicerata
- Class: Arachnida
- Order: Araneae
- Infraorder: Mygalomorphae
- Family: Pycnothelidae
- Genus: Pycnothele; Chamberlin, 1917

Type species
- P. perdita Chamberlin, 1917

Species
- 12, see text

Synonyms
- Agersborgia Strand, 1936; Androthelopsis Mello-Leitão, 1934; Pycnothelopsis Schiapelli & Gerschman, 1942

Genus of spiders

Pycnothele is a genus of South American mygalomorph spiders in the family Pycnothelidae. First described by Ralph Vary Chamberlin in 1917, it was moved to the funnel-web trapdoor spiders in 1985, but moved back to Pycnothelidae in 2020. It is a senior synonym of Agersborgia and Androthelopsis.

== Species ==
As of April 2022 it contains 12 species, found in Argentina, Uruguay, and Brazil:

- Pycnothele arapongas Passanha, Indicatti, Brescovit & Lucas, 2014 – Brazil
- Pycnothele araraquara Passanha, Indicatti, Brescovit & Lucas, 2014 – Brazil
- Pycnothele auripila (Mello-Leitão, 1946) – Uruguay
- Pycnothele auronitens (Keyserling, 1891) – Brazil
- Pycnothele gauderio Passanha, Indicatti, Brescovit & Lucas, 2014 – Brazil
- Pycnothele gigas (Vellard, 1925) – Brazil
- Pycnothele jatai Passanha, Indicatti, Brescovit & Lucas, 2014 – Brazil
- Pycnothele labordai (Pérez-Miles, Costa & Montes de Oca, 2014) – Brazil, Uruguay
- Pycnothele modesta (Schiapelli & Gerschman, 1942) – Uruguay, Argentina
- Pycnothele perdita Chamberlin, 1917 (type) – Brazil
- Pycnothele rubra Passanha, Indicatti, Brescovit & Lucas, 2014 – Brazil
- Pycnothele singularis (Mello-Leitão, 1934) – Brazil

Formerly included:

- P. piracicabensis (Piza, 1938) (Transferred to Rachias)
