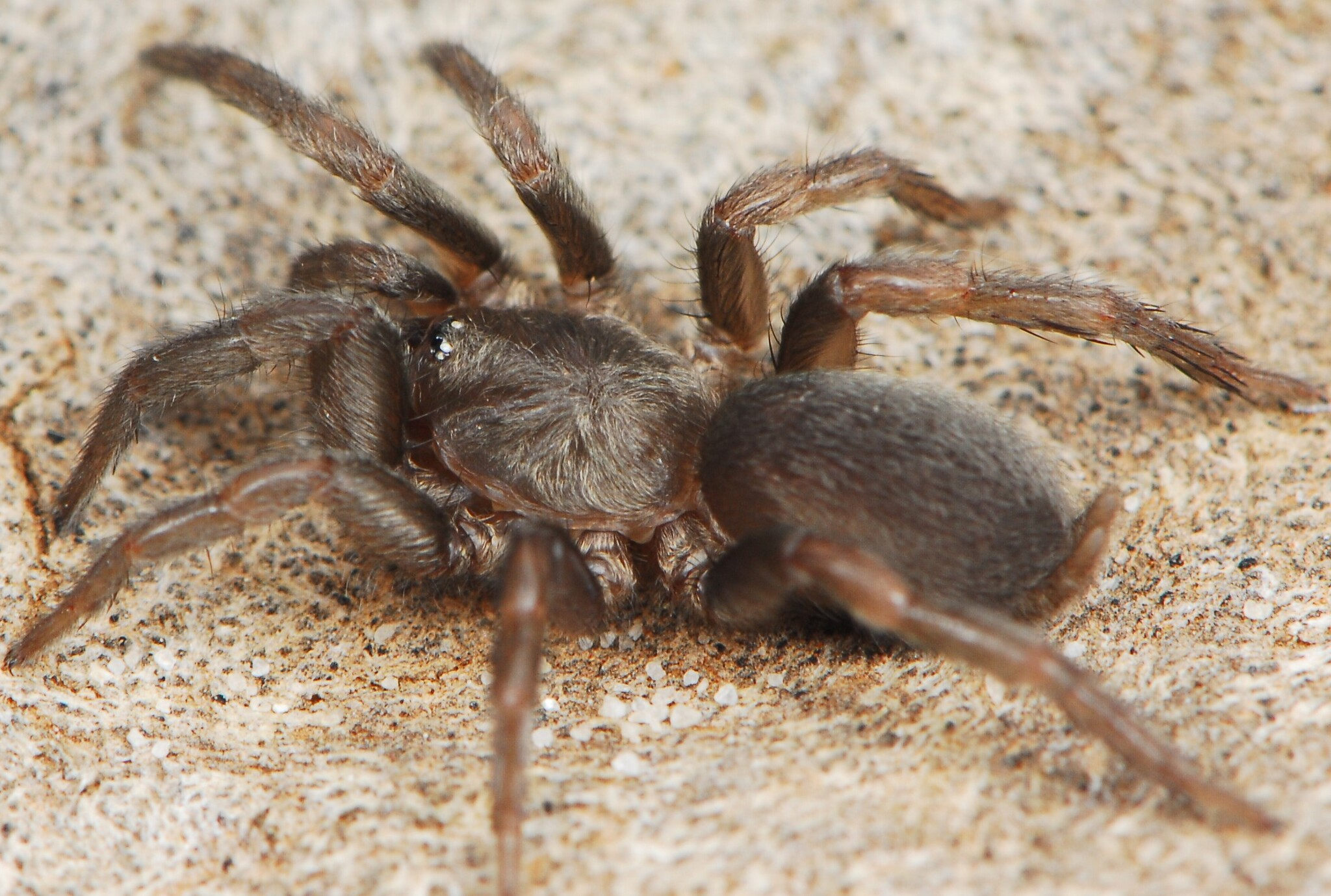
- female H. septemtrionalis
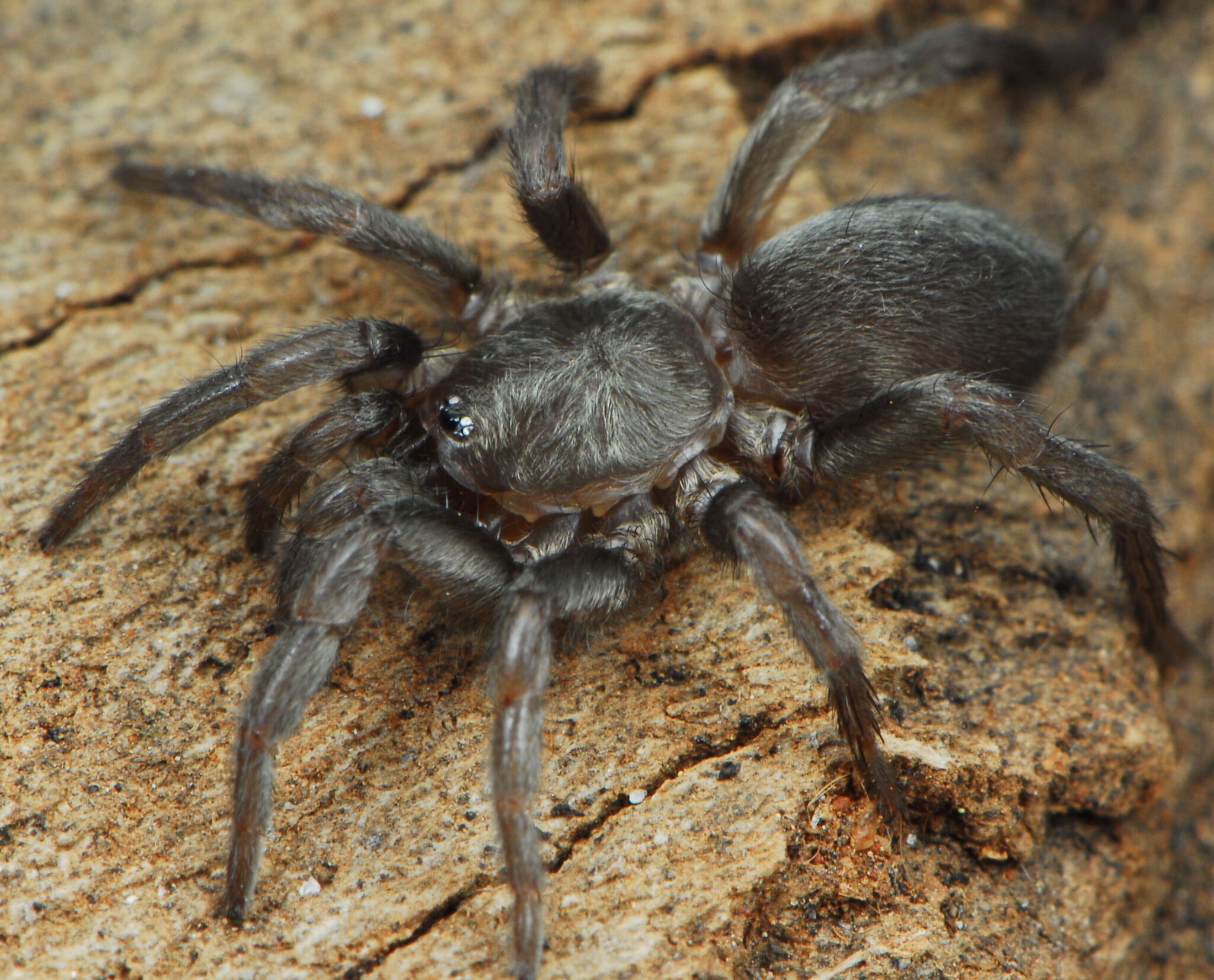
- female H. septemtrionalis

Scientific classification
- Kingdom: Animalia
- Phylum: Arthropoda
- Subphylum: Chelicerata
- Class: Arachnida
- Order: Araneae
- Infraorder: Mygalomorphae
- Family: Entypesidae
- Genus: Hermacha; Simon, 1889

Type species
- H. caudata Simon, 1889

Species
- 17, see text

Synonyms
- Damarchodes Simon, 1903

= Hermacha =

Genus of spiders

Hermacha is a genus of mygalomorphae spiders in the family Entypesidae. It was first described by Eugène Louis Simon in 1889. Originally placed with the Ctenizidae, it was transferred to the funnel-web trapdoor spiders in 1985, then to the Entypesidae in 2020.

It is a senior synonym of Damarchodes and Hermachola.

== Species ==
As of September 2025, this genus includes seventeen species, found in Africa, Colombia, and Brazil:

- Hermacha anomala (Bertkau, 1880) – Brazil
- Hermacha brevicauda Purcell, 1903 – South Africa
- Hermacha caudata Simon, 1889 – Mozambique (type species)
- Hermacha conspersa Mello-Leitão, 1941 – Colombia
- Hermacha evanescens Purcell, 1903 – South Africa
- Hermacha fossor (Bertkau, 1880) – Brazil
- Hermacha fulva Tucker, 1917 – South Africa
- Hermacha itatiayae Mello-Leitão, 1923 – Brazil
- Hermacha lanata Purcell, 1902 – South Africa
- Hermacha maraisae Ríos-Tamayo, Engelbrecht & Goloboff, 2021 – South Africa
- Hermacha mazoena Hewitt, 1915 – Zimbabwe
- Hermacha montana Ríos-Tamayo, Engelbrecht & Goloboff, 2021 – South Africa
- Hermacha nigrispinosa Tucker, 1917 – South Africa
- Hermacha purcelli (Simon, 1903) – South Africa
- Hermacha septemtrionalis Ríos-Tamayo, Engelbrecht & Goloboff, 2021 – South Africa
- Hermacha sericea Purcell, 1902 – South Africa
- Hermacha tuckeri Raven, 1985 – South Africa

Formerly included:

- H. bicolor (Pocock, 1897) (Transferred to Brachytheliscus)
- H. capensis (Ausserer, 1871) (Transferred to Hermachola)
- H. crudeni Hewitt, 1913 (Transferred to Hermachola)
- H. grahami (Hewitt, 1915) (Transferred to Hermachola)
- H. iricolor Mello-Leitão, 1923 (Transferred to Rachias)
- H. leporina Simon, 1891 (Transferred to Stenoterommata)
- H. curvipes Purcell, 1902 (Transferred to Ekapa)
- H. nigra Tucker, 1917 (Transferred to Ekapa)

Nomen dubium

- H. nigromarginata Strand, 1907
