= Pseudoteyl =

Scientific classification
- Domain: Eukaryota
- Kingdom: Animalia
- Phylum: Arthropoda
- Subphylum: Chelicerata
- Class: Arachnida
- Order: Araneae
- Infraorder: Mygalomorphae
- Family: Nemesiidae
- Genus: Pseudoteyl
- Species: P. vancouveri

Binomial name
- Pseudoteyl vancouveri Main, 1985

Genus of spiders

Pseudoteyl is a genus of spiders in the family Nemesiidae. It was first described in 1985 by Main. As of 2017, it contains only one species, Pseudoteyl vancouveri, found in Australia.
