= Afropesa =

Scientific classification
- Kingdom: Animalia
- Phylum: Arthropoda
- Subphylum: Chelicerata
- Class: Arachnida
- Order: Araneae
- Infraorder: Mygalomorphae
- Family: Entypesidae
- Genus: Afropesa; Zonstein & Ríos-Tamayo, 2021

Type species
- Entypesa schoutedeni (Benoit, 1965)

Species
- A. gauteng Zonstein & Ríos-Tamayo, 2021; A. schoutedeni (Benoit, 1965); A. schwendingeri Zonstein & Ríos-Tamayo, 2021

Genus of spiders

Afropesa is a genus of southern African mygalomorph spiders in the family Entypesidae. It was first described by S. L. Zonstein and D. Ríos-Tamayo in 2021, and its three described species are endemic to South Africa.

The type species was originally described under the name "Entypesa schoutedeni.

== Species ==
As of October 2025, this genus includes three species:

- Afropesa gauteng Zonstein & Ríos-Tamayo, 2021
- Afropesa schoutedeni (Benoit, 1965) (type species)
- Afropesa schwendingeri Zonstein & Ríos-Tamayo, 2021

== See also ==
- Entypesa
