= Pionothele straminea =

Cape Pionothele Trapdoor Spider

Scientific classification
- Kingdom: Animalia
- Phylum: Arthropoda
- Subphylum: Chelicerata
- Class: Arachnida
- Order: Araneae
- Infraorder: Mygalomorphae
- Family: Pycnothelidae
- Genus: Pionothele
- Species: P. straminea

Binomial name
- Pionothele straminea Purcell, 1902

Species of spider

Pionothele straminea is a species of spider in the family Pycnothelidae. It is endemic to South Africa and is commonly known as the Cape Pionothele trapdoor spider. This is the type species of the genus Pionothele.

== Distribution ==
Pionothele straminea is endemic to the Western Cape Province. The species inhabits a relatively small subcoastal area from St Helena Bay to the Cederberg Mountains in the north to the Cape Peninsula in the south. The species occurs at altitudes ranging from 4 to 109 m above sea level.

== Habitat and ecology ==
Pionothele straminea are burrow dwelling ground spiders found in the Fynbos biome. Nothing more is known about their behavior.

== Conservation ==
Pionothele straminea is listed as data deficient due to the need for more sampling and identification of museum material to determine the species' current range.

== Etymology ==
The species name straminea comes from "Latin" meaning "straw-colored".

== Taxonomy ==
The species was originally described by William Frederick Purcell in 1902 from the Cederberg Mountains. The female was later described by Tucker in 1917. The species was revised by Zonstein in 2016. The genus Pionothele was originally placed in Ctenizidae, later transferred to Nemesiidae by Raven (1985), and subsequently moved to Pycnothelidae by Opatova et al. (2020).
