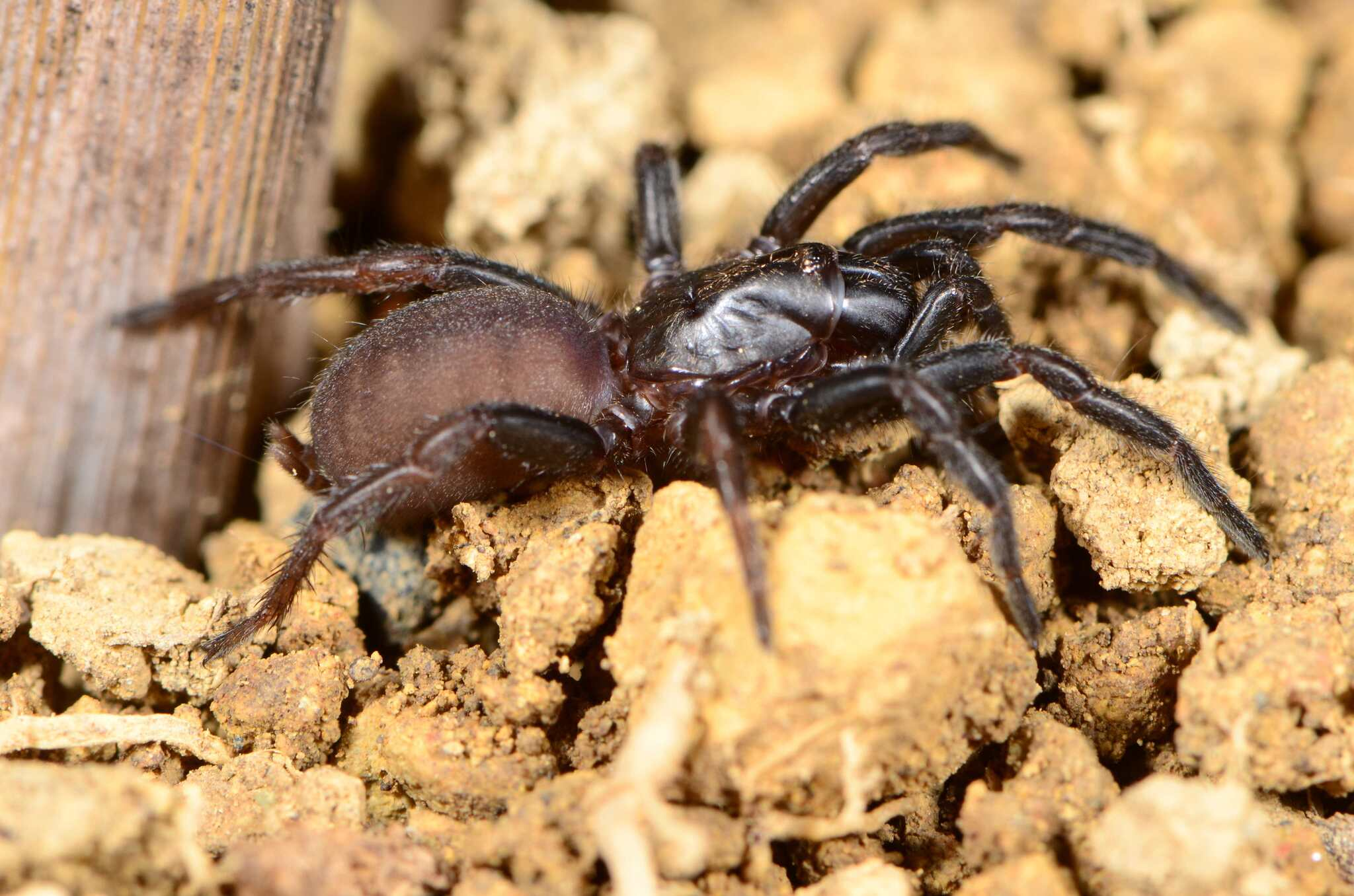
- female
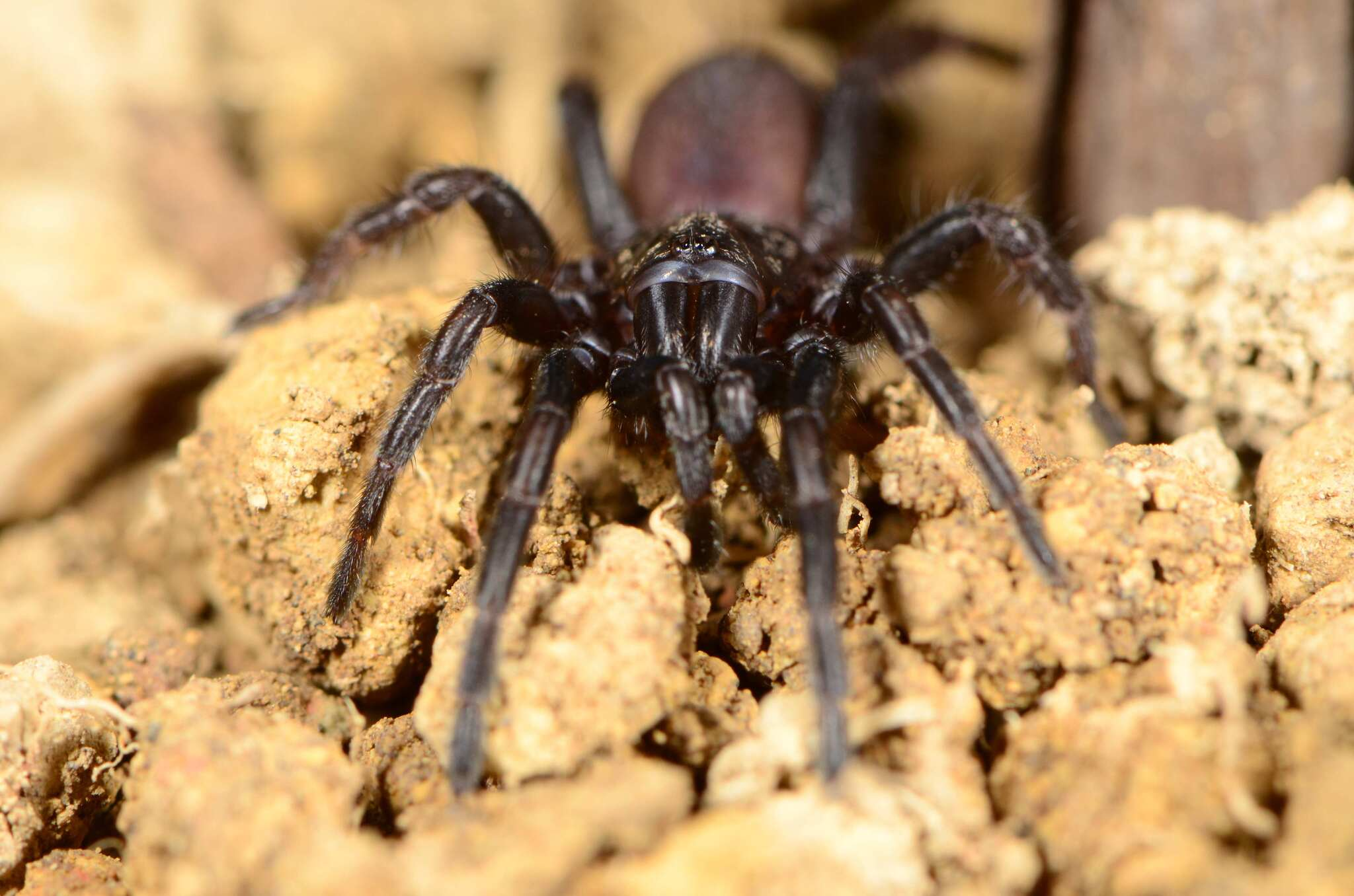
- female

Scientific classification
- Kingdom: Animalia
- Phylum: Arthropoda
- Subphylum: Chelicerata
- Class: Arachnida
- Order: Araneae
- Infraorder: Mygalomorphae
- Family: Entypesidae
- Genus: Brachytheliscus; Pocock, 1902
- Species: B. bicolor

Binomial name
- Brachytheliscus bicolor Pocock, 1897

= Brachytheliscus =

Genus of spiders

Brachytheliscus is a monotypic genus of southern African mygalomorph spiders in the family Entypesidae containing the single species, Brachytheliscus bicolor. It was first described by Reginald Innes Pocock in 1902, and it has only been found in South Africa. It was previously considered a junior synonym of Hermacha, but was moved to genus status in 2021. The type species was originally described under the name "Brachythele bicolor".

== See also ==
- Hermacha
- Brachythele
