= Hermachola =

Scientific classification
- Kingdom: Animalia
- Phylum: Arthropoda
- Subphylum: Chelicerata
- Class: Arachnida
- Order: Araneae
- Infraorder: Mygalomorphae
- Family: Entypesidae
- Genus: Hermachola; Hewitt, 1915

Type species
- Hermacha crudeni (Hewitt, 1913)

Species
- H. capensis (Ausserer, 1871); H. crudeni (Hewitt, 1913); H. lyleae Ríos-Tamayo, Engelbrecht & Goloboff, 2021

Genus of spiders

Hermachola is a genus of southern African mygalomorph spiders in the family Entypesidae. It was first described by J. Hewitt in 1915, and its three described species are endemic to South Africa.

It was previously considered a junior synonym of Hermacha , but was elevated to genus in 2021. The type species, Hermachola crudeni, was originally described under the name "Hermacha crudeni".

== Species ==
As of October 2025, this genus includes three species:

- Hermachola capensis (Ausserer, 1871) – South Africa
- Hermachola crudeni (Hewitt, 1913) – South Africa (type species)
- Hermachola lyleae Ríos-Tamayo, Engelbrecht & Goloboff, 2021 – South Africa

== See also ==
- Hermacha
- Brachythele
