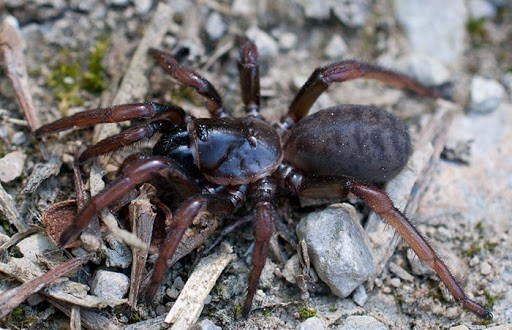

Scientific classification
- Domain: Eukaryota
- Kingdom: Animalia
- Phylum: Arthropoda
- Subphylum: Chelicerata
- Class: Arachnida
- Order: Araneae
- Infraorder: Mygalomorphae
- Family: Nemesiidae
- Genus: Nemesia
- Species: N. simoni

Binomial name
- Nemesia simoni O. Pickard-Cambridge, 1874

= Nemesia simoni =

Species of spider

Nemesia simoni is a species of spider and can be found in Spain and France.
