= Entypesa andohahela =

Scientific classification
- Kingdom: Animalia
- Phylum: Arthropoda
- Subphylum: Chelicerata
- Class: Arachnida
- Order: Araneae
- Infraorder: Mygalomorphae
- Family: Entypesidae
- Genus: Entypesa
- Species: E. andohahela

Binomial name
- Entypesa andohahela Zonstein, 2018

Species of spider

Entypesa andohahela is a species of spider in the family Entypesidae, endemic to Madagascar. It was first described by Sergei Zonstein in 2018. The specific name andohahela refers to the locality in which the first described specimen was found, Andohahela National Park in south-eastern Madagascar.

== Description ==
The male has a body length of about 12 mm. When preserved in alcohol, most of the upper surface of the cephalothorax and most of the legs are brownish red. The pedipalps and the tarsi of the legs are a light yellowish brown. The surface of the abdomen is brownish grey, with small yellowish grey marks. The fourth leg is longest, at about 16 mm. The embolus of the palpal bulb is relatively short, tapering and corkscrew-shaped. The posterior lateral spinnerets are the longest, about 2.4 mm in total.

The female is somewhat larger, with a body length of about 15 mm. Colouring is similar to the male, but with more distinctly defined patterns and markings. The longest leg, the fourth, is about 16 mm long. The spermathecae are relatively short. They have a wide base and then become constricted before widening into a small globular head.

== Distribution and habitat ==
Entypesa andohahela is known only from the type locality, Andohahela National Park in south-eastern Madagascar. It was collected in montane rainforest.
