= Rachias timbo =

Scientific classification
- Kingdom: Animalia
- Phylum: Arthropoda
- Subphylum: Chelicerata
- Class: Arachnida
- Order: Araneae
- Infraorder: Mygalomorphae
- Family: Pycnothelidae
- Genus: Rachias
- Species: R. timbo

Binomial name
- Rachias timbo Goloboff, 1995

Species of spider

Rachias timbo is a mygalomorph spider of Argentina, named after its type locality: El Timbó, Iguazú, Misiones. R. timbo differs from Brazilian Rachias species (with similar genitalia) by being smaller and having lower keels on the male embolus.

== Description ==
Total length of the male paratype was 16.50 millimetres (0.650 in). The length of its cephalothorax was 5.95 millimetres (0.234 in), and width 4.25 millimetres (0.167 in); cephalic region measured 3.55 millimetres (0.140 in) in length, width 5.70 millimetres (0.224 in). Its labium length was 0.45 millimetres (0.018 in), width 1.00 millimetre (0.039 in) and they have no cuspules. Its sternum measures 3.00 millimetres (0.118 in) in length, width 2.46 millimetres (0.097 in) and has a thin reborder. Serrula were absent. Chelicerae: rastellum formed by strong, thick but long and attenuate setae. Its inner margin had 10 or 11 small, widely spaced teeth. Its cephalothorax and femora of legs and palpi were greenish-bluish brown; patellae and the rest of its joints were orange brown. Its abdomen was yellowish-brown with dorsal mottling.

== Distribution ==
Misiones Province.

== See also ==
- Spider anatomy
