= Chilelopsis puertoviejo =

Scientific classification
- Kingdom: Animalia
- Phylum: Arthropoda
- Subphylum: Chelicerata
- Class: Arachnida
- Order: Araneae
- Infraorder: Mygalomorphae
- Family: Pycnothelidae
- Genus: Chilelopsis
- Species: C. puertoviejo

Binomial name
- Chilelopsis puertoviejo Goloboff, 1995

Species of spider

Chilelopsis puertoviejo is a species of mygalomorph spiders of Chile, named after its type locality: Puerto Viejo, Copiapó, Region III. The species is most similar to C. calderoni, but differs in having the distal portion of the male bulbal duct less sinuous and the female spermathecae of uniform width, with no differentiated fundus. It differs from C. serena in the undivided female spermathecae and the male tibia I having a dense apical patch of setae.

== Description ==
- Female: total length 17.2 millimetres (0.68 in); cephalothorax length 6.8 millimetres (0.27 in), width 5.65 millimetres (0.222 in); cephalic region length 4.35 millimetres (0.171 in), width 4.25 millimetres (0.167 in); fovea width 0.95 millimetres (0.037 in); medial ocular quadrangle length 0.61 millimetres (0.024 in), width 1.1 millimetres (0.043 in); labium length 0.77 millimetres (0.030 in), width 1.32 millimetres (0.052 in); sternum length 3.72 millimetres (0.146 in), width 3 millimetres (0.12 in). Its cephalic region is short and wide, with the fovea slightly procurved. Its labium possesses no cuspules; serrula is absent. Its well marked sternal sigilla is shallow, small and oval. Chelicerae: rastellum is formed by thin, long and stiff setae. Color as in C. calderoni.
- Male: total length 11.7 millimetres (0.46 in); cephalothorax length 5.7 millimetres (0.22 in), width 4.75 millimetres (0.187 in); cephalic region length 3.3 millimetres (0.13 in), width 2.9 millimetres (0.11 in); labium length 0.45 millimetres (0.018 in), width 0.812 millimetres (0.0320 in); sternum length 2.8 millimetres (0.11 in), width 2.42 millimetres (0.095 in). Its labium possesses 2 cuspules. Its serrula has some small denticles present. Its sternal sigilla is shallow, small and oval. Chelicerae: rastellum is absent, with long, thin and stiff setae. Cheliceral tumescence is rounded and flat, covered with short, thin setae. Its leg I and tibial apophysis are absent, with a shield of setae on the anteroventral apex. Its metatarsus is evenly curved. Color as in C. calderoni.

== Distribution ==
Sand dunes in Regions III (Atacama Region) and IV (Coquimbo Region).

== See also ==
- Spider anatomy
- Regions of Chile
