= Chilelopsis serena =

Scientific classification
- Kingdom: Animalia
- Phylum: Arthropoda
- Subphylum: Chelicerata
- Class: Arachnida
- Order: Araneae
- Infraorder: Mygalomorphae
- Family: Pycnothelidae
- Genus: Chilelopsis
- Species: C. serena

Binomial name
- Chilelopsis serena Goloboff, 1995

Species of spider

Chilelopsis serena is a species of mygalomorph spiders of Chile, named after its type locality: La Serena, Elqui, Region IV. Males differ from those both C. calderoni and C. puertoviejo in the absence of a patch of setae on the apical tibia I, and also in the palpal tibia having dorsal spines and the bulbal duct being abruptly narrowed at the apex. Females differ from the two other species by their divided spermathecae.

== Description ==
- Female: total length 13.5 millimetres (0.53 in); cephalothorax length 4.6 millimetres (0.18 in), width 3.65 millimetres (0.144 in); cephalic region length 2.8 millimetres (0.11 in), width 2.7 millimetres (0.11 in); fovea width 0.45 millimetres (0.018 in); medial ocular quadrangle length (OQ) 0.44 millimetres (0.017 in), width 0.72 millimetres (0.028 in); labium length 0.42 millimetres (0.017 in), width 0.87 millimetres (0.034 in); sternum length 2.46 millimetres (0.097 in), width 2.01 millimetres (0.079 in). Its cephalic region is short, wide and convex, while its fovea is slightly procurved. Its labium possesses 1 cuspule. A serrula is absent. Its well marked sternal sigilla is small, shallow and oval. Chelicerae: rastellum is formed by strong, blunt setae. It possesses a fang furrow with 15 large denticles. Color as in other Chilelopsis, but with the abdominal pattern more marked.
- Male: total length 9.8 millimetres (0.39 in); cephalothorax length 4.57 millimetres (0.180 in), width 3.73 millimetres (0.147 in); cephalic region length 2.95 millimetres (0.116 in), width 2.2 millimetres (0.087 in); OQ length 0.41 millimetres (0.016 in), width 0.76 millimetres (0.030 in); labium length 0.4 millimetres (0.016 in), width 0.75 millimetres (0.030 in); sternum length 2.45 millimetres (0.096 in), width 2.01 millimetres (0.079 in). Its labium has no cuspules. A serrula is apparently absent. Its well marked sternal sigilla is small, but shallow and oval. Chelicerae: rastellum is formed by thin, long and stiff setae. Its cheliceral tumescence is small, rounded and flat, covered with a few long, thin bristles. Its leg I and tibia have no apophysis nor shield of setae; its metatarsus is bent at ts basal third, protruding backward. Color as in other Chilelopsis.

== Distribution ==
Northern Region IV (Coquimbo Region).

== See also ==
- Spider anatomy
- Regions of Chile
