= Chilelopsis calderoni =

Scientific classification
- Kingdom: Animalia
- Phylum: Arthropoda
- Subphylum: Chelicerata
- Class: Arachnida
- Order: Araneae
- Infraorder: Mygalomorphae
- Family: Pycnothelidae
- Genus: Chilelopsis
- Species: C. calderoni

Binomial name
- Chilelopsis calderoni Goloboff, 1995

Species of spider

Chilelopsis calderoni is a species of mygalomorph spiders of Chile, named after Dr Raúl Calderón. Males differ from C. puertoviejo in the more sinuous distal portion of the bulbal duct; females differ in the spermathecae with a distinct fundus and a narrowed duct. Males differ from C. serena by the presence of a dense patch of setae on the anterior tibiae, females in the undivided spermathecae.

== Description ==
- Female: total length 17.95 millimetres (0.707 in); cephalothorax length 6.4 millimetres (0.25 in), width 5.3 millimetres (0.21 in); cephalic region length 4 millimetres (0.16 in), width 3.55 millimetres (0.140 in); fovea width 0.67 millimetres (0.026 in); medial ocular quadrangle length 0.55 millimetres (0.022 in), width 1.01 millimetres (0.040 in); labium length 0.65 millimetres (0.026 in), width 1.12 millimetres (0.044 in); sternum length 3.32 millimetres (0.131 in), width 2.82 millimetres (0.111 in); clypeus width 0.35 millimetres (0.014 in). Its cephalic region is wide and convex, while its fovea is deep, and straight. Its labium possesses no cuspules, and a serrula is absent. Its sternal sigilla is small and oval. Its chelicerae are robust and short; rastellum formed by long and attenuate but stiff setae. The entire spider is a light yellow colour, while its abdomen has a series of mottles along its dorsum.
- Male: total length 11.24 millimetres (0.443 in); cephalothorax length 5.56 millimetres (0.219 in), width 4.73 millimetres (0.186 in); labium length is 0.62 of its width; sternum width is 0.92 of its length. Its cephalic region is wide and short. Its clypeus is wide. Chelicerae has a weak rastellum, with a large intercheliceral tumescence. Its labium possesses 3 cusps. Its posterior sigilla is large and separated from margin. Its legs and cephalothorax are a yellowish colour, while its abdomen is yellowish with brown spots.

== Distribution ==
Sand dunes in Regions III (Atacama Region) and IV (Coquimbo Region).

== See also ==
- Spider anatomy
- Regions of Chile
