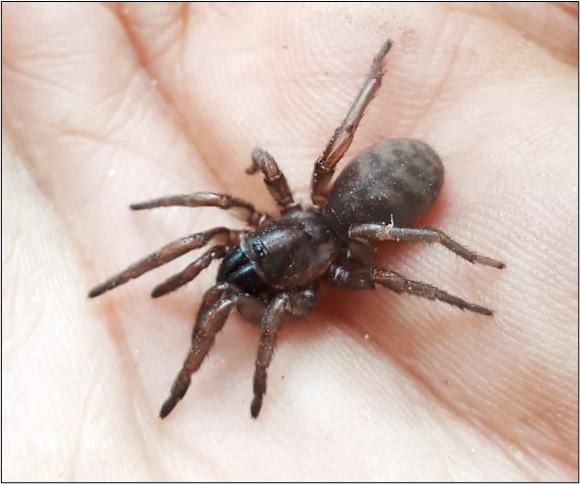

Scientific classification
- Kingdom: Animalia
- Phylum: Arthropoda
- Subphylum: Chelicerata
- Class: Arachnida
- Order: Araneae
- Infraorder: Mygalomorphae
- Family: Nemesiidae
- Genus: Nemesia
- Species: N. berlandi

Binomial name
- Nemesia berlandi Frade & Bacelar, 1931

= Nemesia berlandi =

Species of spider

Fagilde's trapdoor spider (Nemesia berlandi) or buraqueira-de-Fagilde in Portuguese, is a trapdoor spider of the family Nemesiidae, currently only known from Fagilde and the adjacent village of Vila Garcia, both in the Mangualde municipality of the Beira Alta region of Portugal, in the isolated slopes of the Dão River valley.

Considered one of the rarest spiders on earth, this species had not been scientifically recorded for nearly a century, since the first specimens were collected prior to 1931 for their scientific description, and it is feared that the sole specimens known were destroyed in the great Bocage Museum fire of 1978.

This species was described by the Portuguese science pioneer Amélia Bacelar and her husband, Fernando Frade. The scientific name N. berlandi was chosen by the couple to honor their colleague Lucien Berland, from the National Museum of Natural History in Paris. The common name is a reference to the site where it was originally found, in Fagilde.

A unique attribute is that they build their nests horizontally unlike other species of trapdoor spider. According to Re:wild, males of this species tap dance to attract mates. This species is on Re:wild's Search For Lost Species, it became lost around 1931 and was rediscovered in 2023, using DNA to rule out other species in the region.

92 years later, arachnologists rediscovered the Nemesia berlandi spider species in northern Portugal, noticing a female with ten offspring. This species' females are dark brown and can grow up to 2.2 cm long. For now, there is no information about Nemesia berlandi males and lifecycle; however, it is known that many spiders from the Nemesiidae family live in burrows with webbed walls and a lid at the entrance, capturing passing prey. The researchers hope this discovery will contribute to the species' preservation, especially in light of the threat posed by agricultural development and frequent forest fires in their habitat due to climate change.

== Rediscovery and conservation ==
Trapdoor spiders are one of the conservation priorities for the International Union for Conservation of Nature, and local efforts are underway to protect Fagilde's trapdoor. In 2022 it was the only European species and the first spider, to be included in Re:wild's Lost Species list, a project that selected the top 25 most wanted species in the world, as no record of Fagilde's trapdoor had been made in nearly a century.
