= Pycnothele labordai =

Scientific classification
- Kingdom: Animalia
- Phylum: Arthropoda
- Subphylum: Chelicerata
- Class: Arachnida
- Order: Araneae
- Infraorder: Mygalomorphae
- Family: Pycnothelidae
- Genus: Pycnothele
- Species: P. labordai

Binomial name
- Pycnothele labordai (Pérez-Miles, Costa & Montes de Oca, 2014)

Monotypic genus of spiders

Pycnothele labordai is a species of South American mygalomorph spiders in the family Pycnothelidae. It is the only species in the monotypic genus Pycnothele. It was first described by F. Pérez-Miles, F. G. Costa & L. Montes de Oca in 2014 under the genus Bayana, and is found in Uruguay and Brazil. Originally placed with the funnel-web trapdoor spiders, it was transferred to the Pycnothelidae in 2020.
