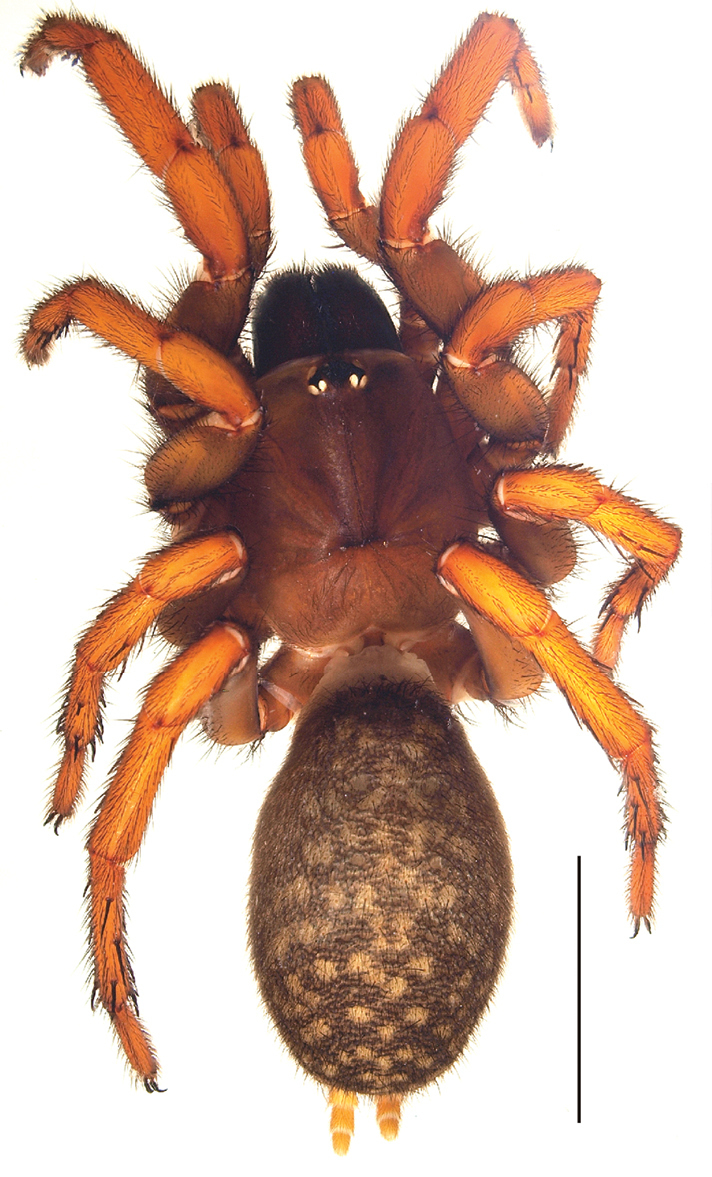
- R. chayi, female

Scientific classification
- Kingdom: Animalia
- Phylum: Arthropoda
- Subphylum: Chelicerata
- Class: Arachnida
- Order: Araneae
- Infraorder: Mygalomorphae
- Family: Nemesiidae
- Genus: Raveniola; Zonstein

Type species
- Raveniola virgata (Simon, 1891)

Species
- 43, see text

= Raveniola =

Genus of spiders

Raveniola is a genus of spiders in the family Nemesiidae, first described in 1987 by Zonstein.

== Species ==
As of 2025, it contains 73 species widely distributed in Asia:

- Raveniola adjarica Zonstein, Kunt & Yağmur, 2018 — Georgia
- Raveniola afghana Zonstein, 2024 — Afghanistan
- Raveniola alajensis Zonstein, 2024 — Kyrgyzstan, Tajikistan
- Raveniola alpina Li & Zonstein, 2015 — China
- Raveniola ambardzumyani Marusik & Zonstein, 2021 — Armenia
- Raveniola anadolu Zonstein, Kunt & Yağmur, 2018 — Turkey
- Raveniola arthuri Kunt & Yağmur, 2010 — Turkey
- Raveniola azerbajdzhanica Nuruyeva, Zamani & Snegovaya, 2024 — Azerbaijan
- Raveniola beelzebub Lin & Li, 2020 — China
- Raveniola bellula Li & Zonstein, 2015 — China
- Raveniola birecikensis Zonstein, Kunt & Yağmur, 2018 — Turkey
- Raveniola caudata Zonstein, 2009 — Tajikistan
- Raveniola chayi Li & Zonstein, 2015 — China
- Raveniola concolor Zonstein, 2000 — Pakistan
- Raveniola cucullata Zonstein, 2024 — Tajikistan
- Raveniola diluta Zonstein, 2024 — Tajikistan
- Raveniola dolosa Zonstein, 2024 — Tajikistan
- Raveniola dunini Zonstein, Kunt & Yağmur, 2018 — Armenia, Azerbaijan, Iran
- Raveniola farkhor Zamani & Fomichev, 2025
- Raveniola fedotovi (Charitonov, 1946) — Central Asia
- Raveniola ferghanensis (Zonstein, 1984) — Kyrgyzstan
- Raveniola fuzhouensis Zhou, 2025 — China
- Raveniola gracilis Li & Zonstein, 2015 — China
- Raveniola guangxi (Raven & Schwendinger, 1995) — China
- Raveniola guseinovi Nuruyeva, Zamani & Snegovaya, 2024 — Azerbaijan
- Raveniola hebeinica Zhu, Zhang & Zhang, 1999 — China
- Raveniola hirta Zonstein, 2024 — Tajikistan
- Raveniola hyrcanica Dunin, 1988 — Azerbaijan
- Raveniola ignobilis Zonstein, 2024 — Tajikistan
- Raveniola inopinata Zonstein, 2024 — Tajikistan
- Raveniola insolita Zonstein, 2024 — Tajikistan
- Raveniola jundai (Lin & Li, 2022) — China
- Raveniola karategensis Zonstein, 2024 — Tajikistan
- Raveniola kirgizica Zonstein, 2024 — Kyrgyzstan
- Raveniola kopetdaghensis (Fet, 1984) — Turkmenistan
- Raveniola lamia Yu & Zhang, 2021 — China
- Raveniola marusiki Zonstein, Kunt & Yağmur, 2018 — Iran
- Raveniola mazandaranica Marusik, Zamani & Mirshamsi, 2014 — Iran
- Raveniola micropa (Ausserer, 1871) — Turkey
- Raveniola mikhailovi Zonstein, 2021 — Kyrgyzstan
- Raveniola montana Zonstein & Marusik, 2012 — China
- Raveniola nana Zonstein, Kunt & Yağmur, 2018 — Turkey
- Raveniola nenilini Zonstein, 2024 — Uzbekistan
- Raveniola niedermeyeri (Brignoli, 1972) — Iran
- Raveniola ornata Zonstein, 2024 — Uzbekistan, Tajikistan
- Raveniola ornatula Zonstein, 2024 — Tajikistan
- Raveniola ovchinnikovi Zonstein, 2024 — Kazakhstan, Kyrgyzstan
- Raveniola pallens Zonstein, 2024 — Uzbekistan
- Raveniola pamira Zonstein, 2024 — Tajikistan
- Raveniola pontica (Spassky, 1937) — Russia (Caucasus), Georgia
- Raveniola redikorzevi (Spassky, 1937) — Turkmenistan
- Raveniola reuteri Zonstein & Marusik, 2025 — China
- Raveniola rugosa Li & Zonstein, 2015 — China
- Raveniola shangrila Zonstein & Marusik, 2012 — China
- Raveniola shixiu Lin, Wang & Li, 2024 — China
- Raveniola sinani Zonstein, Kunt & Yağmur, 2018 — Turkey
- Raveniola songi Zonstein & Marusik, 2012 — China
- Raveniola sororcula Zonstein, 2024 — Tajikistan
- Raveniola spirula Li & Zonstein, 2015 — China
- Raveniola tarabaevi Zonstein, 2024 — Kazakhstan
- Raveniola turcica Zonstein, Kunt & Yağmur, 2018 — Turkey
- Raveniola virgata (Simon, 1891) (type) — Central Asia
- Raveniola vonwicki Zonstein, 2000 — Iran
- Raveniola vulpina Zonstein, 2024 — Kyrgyzstan
- Raveniola xiezhen Lin, Wang & Li, 2024 — China
- Raveniola xizangensis (Hu & Li, 1987) — China
- Raveniola yajiangensis Li & Zonstein, 2015 — China
- Raveniola yalong Zonstein & Marusik, 2025 — China
- Raveniola yangren (Lin & Li, 2022) — China
- Raveniola yunnanensis Zonstein & Marusik, 2012 — China
- Raveniola zaitzevi (Charitonov, 1948) — Azerbaijan, Georgia
- Raveniola zonsteini Zamani & Fomichev, 2025 — Afghanistan
- Raveniola zyuzini Zonstein, 2024 — Uzbekistan
