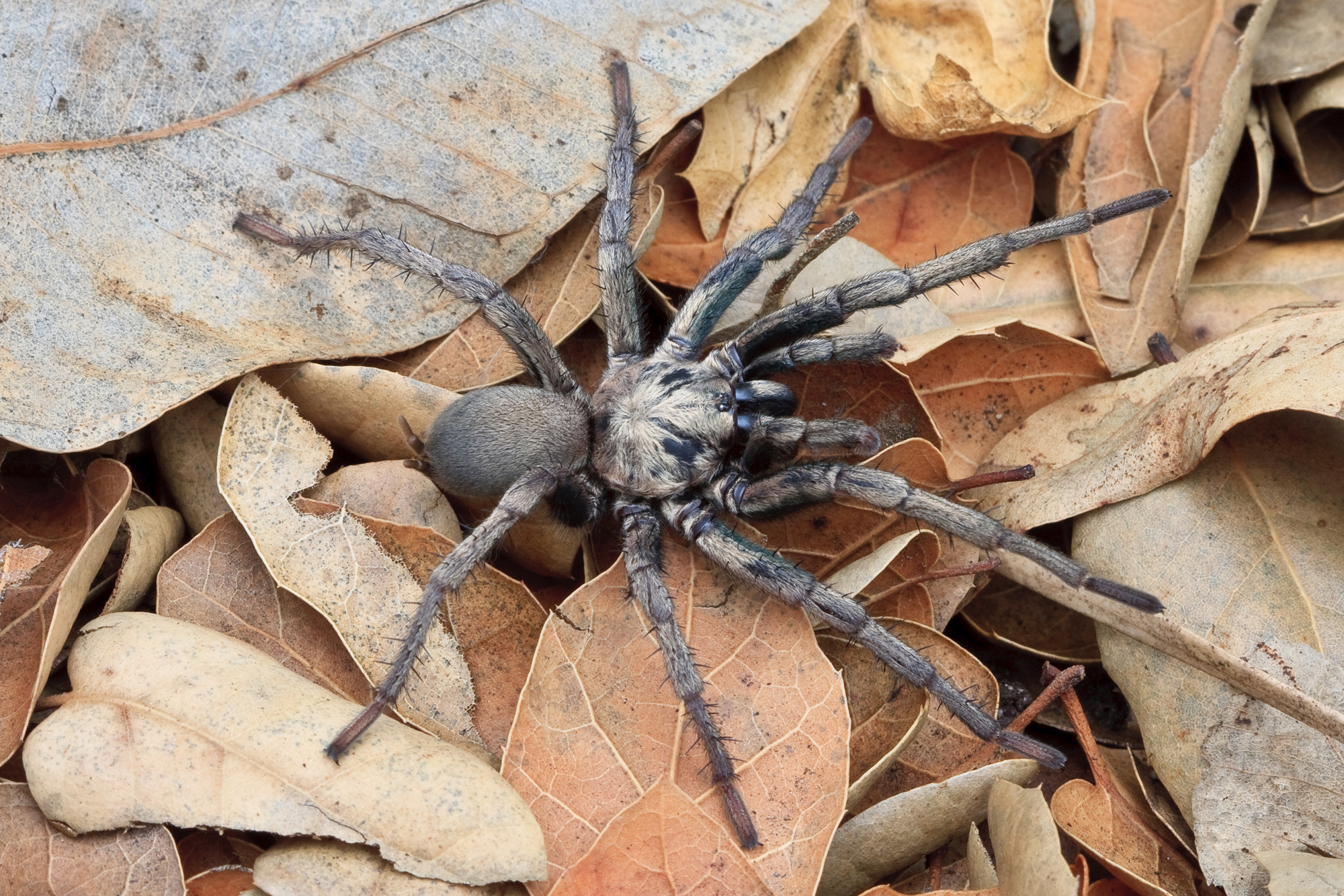
- C. longitarsis, male

Scientific classification
- Kingdom: Animalia
- Phylum: Arthropoda
- Subphylum: Chelicerata
- Class: Arachnida
- Order: Araneae
- Infraorder: Mygalomorphae
- Family: Nemesiidae
- Genus: Calisoga; Chamberlin

Species
- Calisoga anomala (Schenkel, 1950); Calisoga centronetha (Chamberlin & Ivie, 1939); Calisoga longitarsis (Simon, 1891); Calisoga sacra Chamberlin, 1937; Calisoga theveneti (Simon, 1891)

Synonyms
- Hesperopholis

= Calisoga =

Genus of spiders

Calisoga is a genus of spiders in the family Nemesiidae, first described in 1937 by Ralph Vary Chamberlin. As of February 2019, it contains five species, all in the USA.
