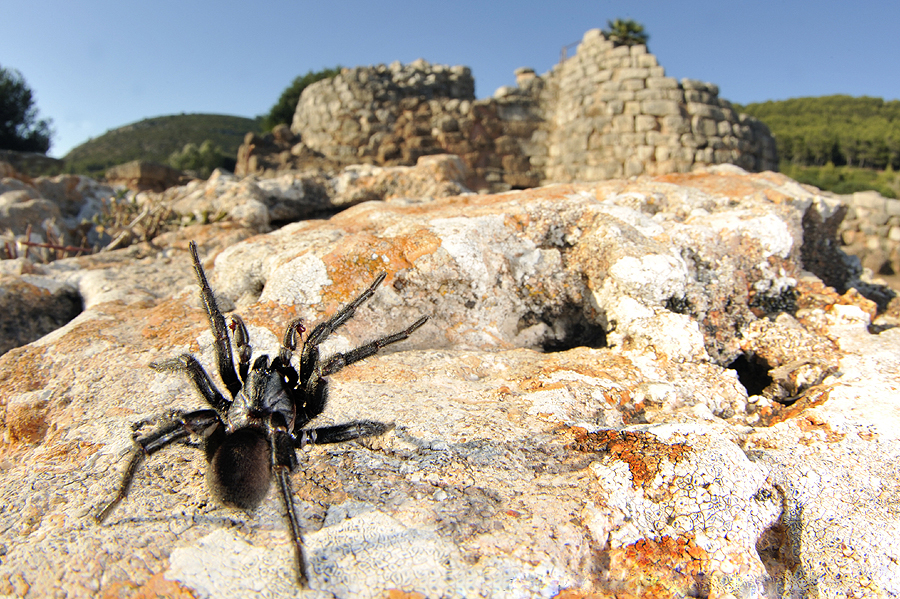
- Amblyocarenum nuragicus

Scientific classification
- Kingdom: Animalia
- Phylum: Arthropoda
- Subphylum: Chelicerata
- Class: Arachnida
- Order: Araneae
- Infraorder: Mygalomorphae
- Family: Nemesiidae
- Genus: Amblyocarenum; Simon, 1889

= Amblyocarenum =

Genus of spiders

Amblyocarenum is a genus of spider in the family Nemesiidae, found in southern Europe and the Mediterranean. It was formerly placed in the family Cyrtaucheniidae.

== Species ==
As of April 2016, the World Spider Catalog accepted the following species:

- Amblyocarenum doleschalli (Ausserer, 1871) – Italy, Sicily
- Amblyocarenum nuragicus Decae, Colombo & Manunza, 2014 – Sardinia
- Amblyocarenum obscurus (Ausserer, 1871) – Sicily
- Amblyocarenum walckenaeri (Lucas, 1846) (type species) – Mediterranean
