= Damarchilus =

Scientific classification
- Kingdom: Animalia
- Phylum: Arthropoda
- Subphylum: Chelicerata
- Class: Arachnida
- Order: Araneae
- Infraorder: Mygalomorphae
- Family: Nemesiidae
- Genus: Damarchilus; Siliwal, Molur & Raven, 2015

Species
- Damarchilus nigricus Siliwal, Molur & Raven, 2015; Damarchilus rufus Siliwal, Molur & Raven, 2015

Genus of spiders

Damarchilus is a genus of spiders in the family Nemesiidae. It was first described in 2015 by Siliwal, Molur & Raven. As of 2017, it contains 2 species, both from India.
