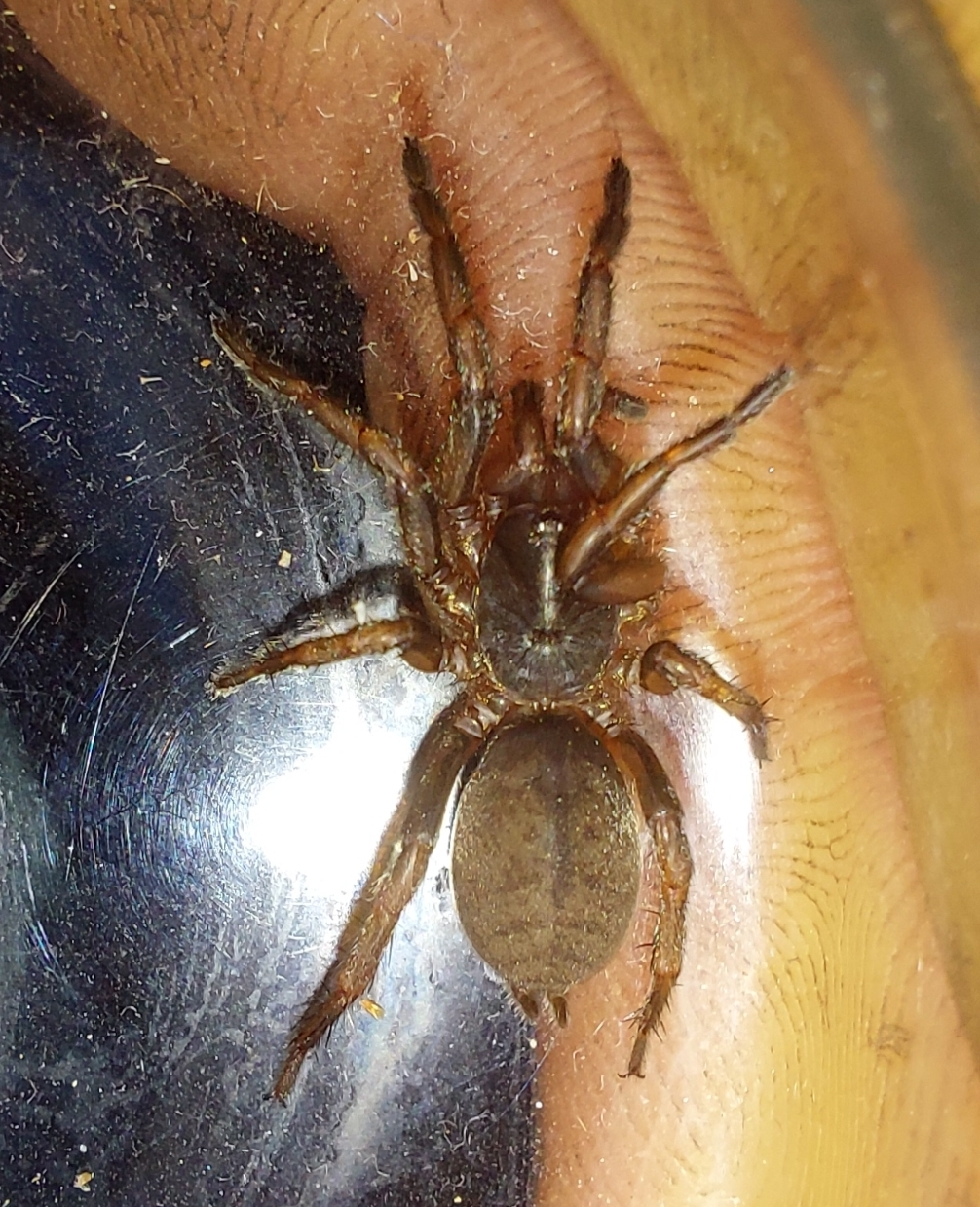
- female

Scientific classification
- Kingdom: Animalia
- Phylum: Arthropoda
- Subphylum: Chelicerata
- Class: Arachnida
- Order: Araneae
- Infraorder: Mygalomorphae
- Family: Entypesidae
- Genus: Ekapa; Ríos-Tamayo, Lyle & Sole, 2023
- Species: E. curvipes

Binomial name
- Ekapa curvipes (Purcell, 1902)

Synonyms
- Hermacha curvipes Purcell, 1902; Hermacha nigra Tucker, 1917; Damarchodes purcelli Bonnet, 1956

= Ekapa =

Species of spider

Ekapa is a South African monotypic genus of mygalomorph spiders in the family Entypesidae, containing the single species Ekapa curvipes.

== Distribution ==
Ekapa curvipes is endemic to the Western Cape province of South Africa.

== Etymology ==
Ekapa is the Xhosa name for Cape Town.

== Description ==
Ekapa can be distinguished from all other related genera in the family Entypesidae by the presence of a retroventral projection in the male palpal tibia.
