= Chilelopsis minima =

Scientific classification
- Kingdom: Animalia
- Phylum: Arthropoda
- Subphylum: Chelicerata
- Class: Arachnida
- Order: Araneae
- Infraorder: Mygalomorphae
- Family: Pycnothelidae
- Genus: Chilelopsis
- Species: C. minima

Binomial name
- Chilelopsis minima Montes de Oca et al., 2022

Genus of spiders

Chilelopsis minima is a species of mygalomorph spiders found in Chile. It formerly belonged in the genus Flamencopsis. The specific name was given because it is the smallest member of the tribe Diplothelopsini.

== Description ==
- Female: total length 10.7 millimetres (0.42 in); cephalothorax length 3.77 millimetres (0.148 in), width 2.9 millimetres (0.11 in); cephalic region length 2.4 millimetres (0.094 in), width 2.21 millimetres (0.087 in); fovea width 0.5 millimetres (0.020 in); medial ocular quadrangle (OQ) length 0.36 millimetres (0.014 in), width 0.62 millimetres (0.024 in); labium length 0.36 millimetres (0.014 in), width 0.71 millimetres (0.028 in); sternum length 2.11 millimetres (0.083 in), width 1.61 millimetres (0.063 in). Its cephalic region is wide, short and strongly convex, with its fovea procurved. Its labium possesses no cuspules. A serrula is not visible. Chelicerae: rastellum is formed by short blunt cusps, and it has a fang furrow with 8 large denticles. Its cephalothorax, legs and palpi are a grayish-brownish yellow colour, while its abdomen has a dorsal blackish-brownish chevron.
- Male: total length 7.25 millimetres (0.285 in); cephalothorax length 3.2 millimetres (0.13 in), width 2.48 millimetres (0.098 in); cephalic region length 1.65 millimetres (0.065 in), width 1.5 millimetres (0.059 in); OQ length 0.3 millimetres (0.012 in), width 0.54 millimetres (0.021 in); labium length 0.29 millimetres (0.011 in), width 0.6 millimetres (0.024 in); sternum length 1.84 millimetres (0.072 in), width 1.37 millimetres (0.054 in). Its labium possesses no cuspules, its maxillae having 8 thick but attenuate cuspules. A serrula is absent. Its sternal sigilla is small and shallow, and its sternum is rebordered. Chelicerae: rastellum has thick attenuate setae and a fang furrow with large denticles. Cheliceral tumescence is large and rounded. Color as in female.

== Distribution and behaviour ==
Only known from the provinces of Chafiaral Province and Copiapo, Region III (Atacama). The type locality is situated near the sea. It is known to habitate thin sand, particularly in narrow Y-shaped burrows. The burrows are usually between 5 and 6 millimetres (0.20 and 0.24 in) wide, and up to 30 centimetres (12 in) deep. During the day, the sand covers the flap-door completely. At night, the burrows are opened (its flap-door turned completely backwards). Spiders stay at the door awaiting prey.

== See also ==
- Spider anatomy
- Regions of Chile
