= Hermacha brevicauda =

Scientific classification
- Kingdom: Animalia
- Phylum: Arthropoda
- Subphylum: Chelicerata
- Class: Arachnida
- Order: Araneae
- Infraorder: Mygalomorphae
- Family: Entypesidae
- Genus: Hermacha
- Species: H. brevicauda

Binomial name
- Hermacha brevicauda Purcell, 1903

Synonyms
- Pionothele capensis Zonstein, 2016

Species of spider

Hermacha brevicauda is a species of spider in the family Entypesidae. It is found in South Africa.

== Distribution ==
Hermacha brevicauda was originally described from two males found at the foot of "Devils Mountain" near Cape Town. Zonstein described both genders as Pionothele capensis (Pycnothelidae) in 2016. These were collected in 1991 at Muizenberg in the Western Cape Province, where it has been recorded at an altitude of 6 m above sea level.

== Habitat and ecology ==
The species is a ground dweller that inhabits dunes north of Muizenberg in the Fynbos biome. Known only from several records sampled at the type locality in 1991.

== Conservation ==
Pionothele capensis is listed as Data Deficient due to limited sampling and the need for identification of museum material to determine the species' range.

== Etymology ==
The species name brevicauda comes from Latin meaning "short tail".

== Taxonomy ==
The species was originally described by William Frederick Purcell in 1903. In 2016, Zonstein described Pionothele capensis, which was later synonymized with Hermacha brevicauda by Ríos-Tamayo, Engelbrecht & Goloboff in 2021. This taxonomic change transferred the species from the genus Pionothele back to Hermacha.
