= Sinopesa =

Scientific classification
- Domain: Eukaryota
- Kingdom: Animalia
- Phylum: Arthropoda
- Subphylum: Chelicerata
- Class: Arachnida
- Order: Araneae
- Infraorder: Mygalomorphae
- Family: Nemesiidae
- Genus: Sinopesa; Schwendinger

Type species
- Sinopesa maculata

Species
- 8, see text

Genus of spiders

Sinopesa is a genus of spiders in the family Nemesiidae. It is found in China and on Ryukyu Islands in Japan. It was first described in 1995 by Raven & Schwendinger. As of 2023, it contains 8 Asian species.

== Species ==
Sinopesa comprises the following species:

- Sinopesa chengbuensis (Xu & Yin, 2002) — China
- Sinopesa chinensis (Kulczyński, 1901) — China
- Sinopesa gollum Lin & Li, 2021 — China
- Sinopesa guansheng Lin & Li, 2023 — China
- Sinopesa kumensis Shimojana & Haupt, 2000 — Japan (Ryukyu Is.)
- Sinopesa maculata Raven & Schwendinger, 1995 — Thailand
- Sinopesa ninhbinhensis Li & Zonstein, 2015 — Vietnam
- Sinopesa sinensis (Zhu & Mao, 1983) — China
