= Pycnothele gigas =

Scientific classification
- Kingdom: Animalia
- Phylum: Arthropoda
- Subphylum: Chelicerata
- Class: Arachnida
- Order: Araneae
- Infraorder: Mygalomorphae
- Family: Pycnothelidae
- Genus: Pycnothele
- Species: P. gigas

Binomial name
- Pycnothele gigas Vellard, 1925

Genus of spiders

Pycnothele gigas is a species of spiders found in Brazil in the family Pycnothelidae. It was first described in 1925 by Vellard. It formerly belonged in the genus Neostothis.
