= Lepthercus =

Scientific classification
- Kingdom: Animalia
- Phylum: Arthropoda
- Subphylum: Chelicerata
- Class: Arachnida
- Order: Araneae
- Infraorder: Mygalomorphae
- Family: Entypesidae
- Genus: Lepthercus; Purcell, 1902

Type species
- L. dregei Purcell, 1902

Species
- 11, see text

Genus of spiders

Lepthercus is a genus of South African mygalomorph spiders in the family Entypesidae. It was first described by William Frederick Purcell in 1902. Originally placed with the Ctenizidae, it was transferred to the Nemesiidae in 1985, then to the Entypesidae in 2020.

All described species are endemic to South Africa.

== Species ==
As of October 2025, this genus includes eleven species:

- Lepthercus confusus Ríos-Tamayo & Lyle, 2020
- Lepthercus dippenaarae Ríos-Tamayo & Lyle, 2020
- Lepthercus dregei Purcell, 1902 (type species)
- Lepthercus engelbrechti Ríos-Tamayo & Lyle, 2020
- Lepthercus filmeri Ríos-Tamayo & Lyle, 2020
- Lepthercus haddadi Ríos-Tamayo & Lyle, 2020
- Lepthercus kwazuluensis Ríos-Tamayo & Lyle, 2020
- Lepthercus lawrencei Ríos-Tamayo & Lyle, 2020
- Lepthercus mandelai Ríos-Tamayo & Lyle, 2020
- Lepthercus rattrayi Hewitt, 1917
- Lepthercus sofiae Ríos-Tamayo & Lyle, 2020
