= Chilelopsis =

Scientific classification
- Kingdom: Animalia
- Phylum: Arthropoda
- Subphylum: Chelicerata
- Class: Arachnida
- Order: Araneae
- Infraorder: Mygalomorphae
- Family: Pycnothelidae
- Genus: Chilelopsis; Goloboff, 1995

Genus of spiders

Chilelopsis is a genus of spider in the family Pycnothelidae.

== Species ==
As of 2022, the World Spider Catalog accepted the following species:

- Chilelopsis calderoni Goloboff, 1995 (type species) – Chile
- Chilelopsis minima (Goloboff, 1995) — Chile
- Chilelopsis puertoviejo Goloboff, 1995 – Chile
- Chilelopsis serena Goloboff, 1995 – Chile
