= Iberesia =

Scientific classification
- Domain: Eukaryota
- Kingdom: Animalia
- Phylum: Arthropoda
- Subphylum: Chelicerata
- Class: Arachnida
- Order: Araneae
- Infraorder: Mygalomorphae
- Family: Nemesiidae
- Genus: Iberesia; Cardoso

Species
- 6, see text

Genus of spiders

Iberesia is a genus of spiders in the family Nemesiidae. It was first described in 2006 by Decae & Cardoso. As of 2021, it contains 6 Mediterranean species.

== Species ==
As of January 2025, the World Spider Catalog accepted 6 species:

- Iberesia arturica Calvo, 2020 — Spain
- Iberesia barbara (Lucas, 1846) — Morocco, Algeria, Spain
- Iberesia brauni (L. Koch, 1882) — Spain (incl. Balearic Is.)
- Iberesia castillana (Frade & Bacelar, 1931) — Spain
- Iberesia machadoi Decae & Cardoso, 2006 (type) — Portugal, Spain
- Iberesia valdemoriana Luis de la Iglesia, 2019 — Spain
