= Mexentypesa =

Scientific classification
- Domain: Eukaryota
- Kingdom: Animalia
- Phylum: Arthropoda
- Subphylum: Chelicerata
- Class: Arachnida
- Order: Araneae
- Infraorder: Mygalomorphae
- Family: Nemesiidae
- Genus: Mexentypesa
- Species: M. chiapas

Binomial name
- Mexentypesa chiapas Raven, 1987

Genus of spiders

Mexentypesa is a genus of spiders in the family Nemesiidae. It was first described in 1987 by Raven. As of 2017, it contains only one species, Mexentypesa chiapas, from Mexico.
