= Gravelyia =

Scientific classification
- Kingdom: Animalia
- Phylum: Arthropoda
- Subphylum: Chelicerata
- Class: Arachnida
- Order: Araneae
- Infraorder: Mygalomorphae
- Family: Nemesiidae
- Genus: Gravelyia; Mirza & Mondal, 2018

Type species
- G. excavatus (Gravely, 1921)

Species
- 3, see text

Genus of spiders

Gravelyia is a genus of Indian mygalomorph spiders in the family Nemesiidae, first described by Zeeshan A. Mirza & Ayan Mondal in 2018. As of July 2021 it contains only three species.

== Species ==
As of July 2021, the World Spider Catalog accepted 3 species:

- Gravelyia boro (Basumatary & Brahma, 2021) — India
- Gravelyia excavatus (Gravely, 1921) (type) — India
- Gravelyia striatus Mirza & Mondal, 2018 — India
