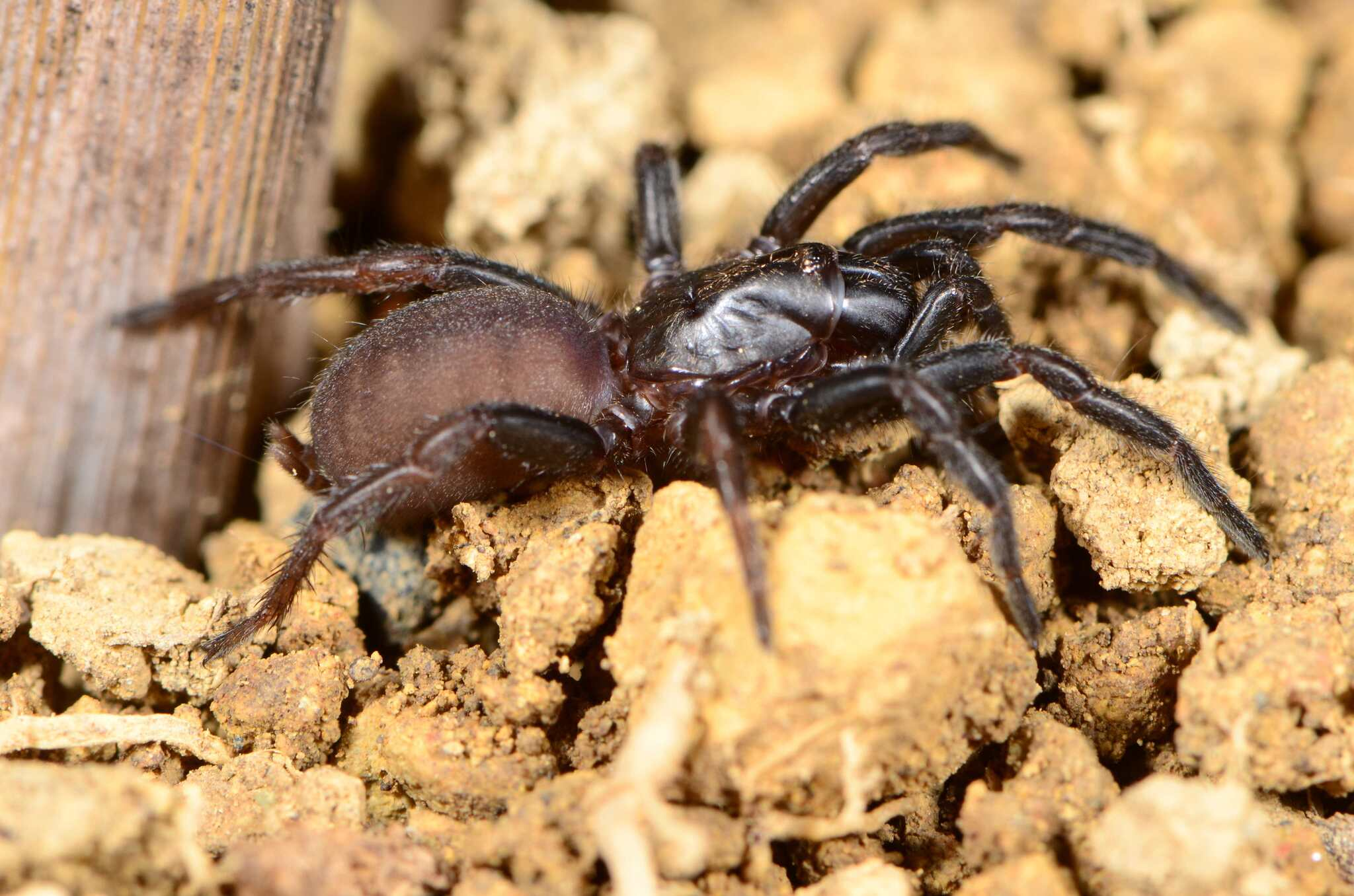
- female Brachytheliscus bicolor
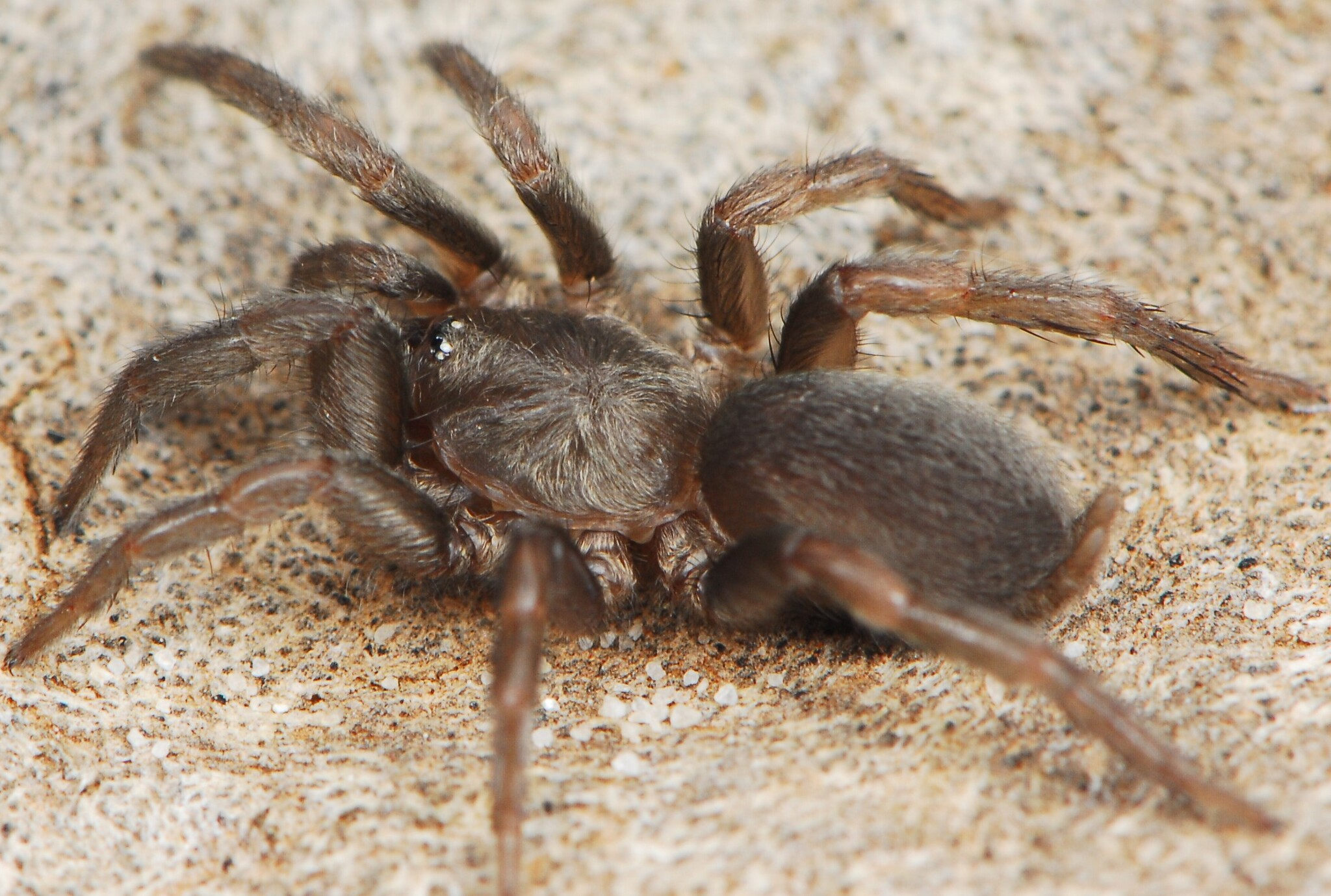
- female Hermacha septemtrionalis

Scientific classification
- Kingdom: Animalia
- Phylum: Arthropoda
- Subphylum: Chelicerata
- Class: Arachnida
- Order: Araneae
- Infraorder: Mygalomorphae
- Clade: Avicularioidea
- Family: Entypesidae; Bond, Opatova & Hedin, 2020

Diversity
- 7 genera, 41 species
- blue: reported countries (WSC)

= Entypesidae =

Family of spiders

Entypesidae is a family of African mygalomorphae spiders. It was first erected in 2020, and originally included three genera moved from the funnel-web trapdoor spiders (family Nemesiidae).

== Genera ==
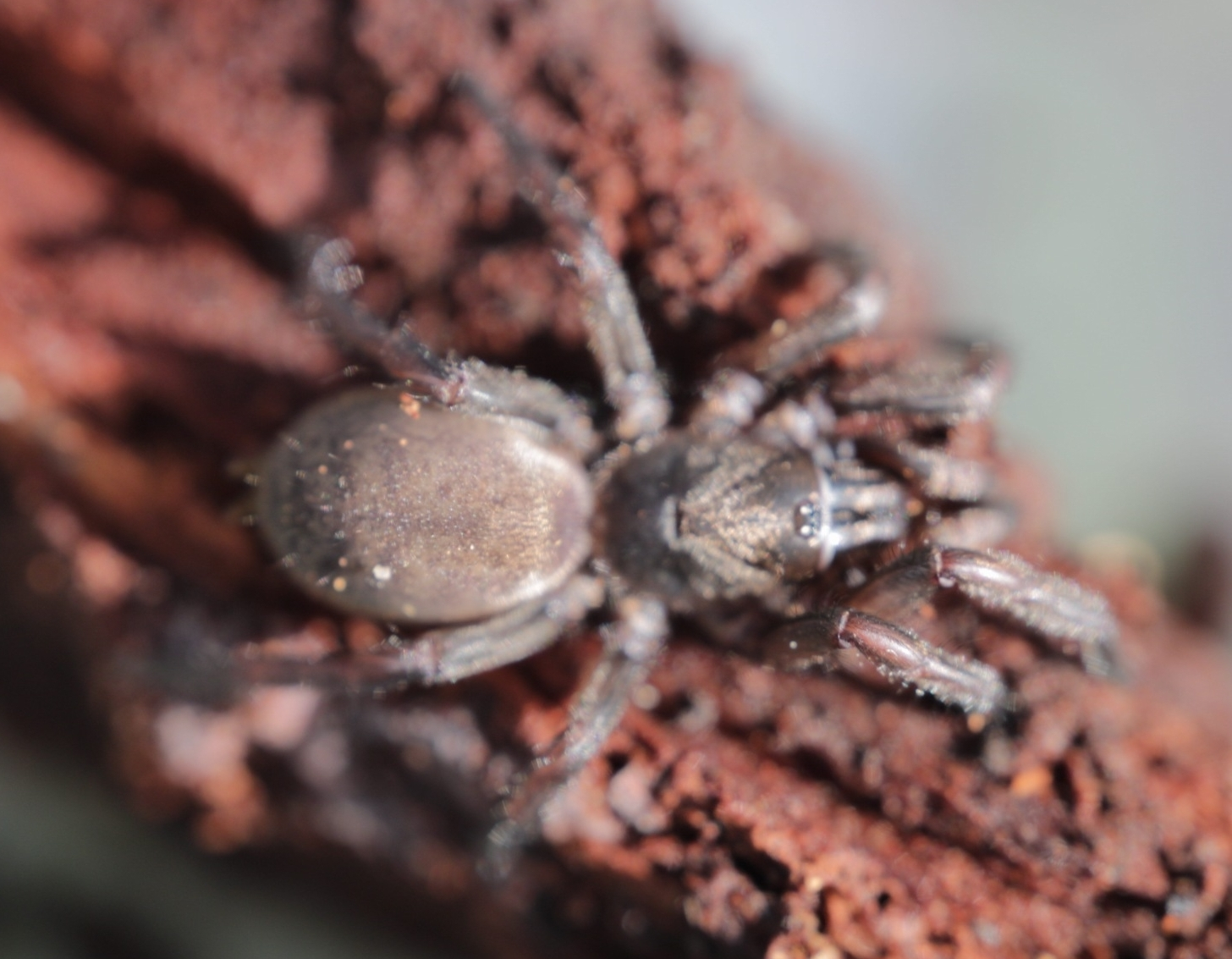
Ekapa curvipes

As of January 2026, this family includes seven genera and 41 species:

- Afropesa Zonstein & Ríos-Tamayo, 2021 – South Africa
- Brachytheliscus Pocock, 1902 – South Africa
- Ekapa Ríos-Tamayo, Lyle & Sole, 2023 – South Africa
- Entypesa Simon, 1902 – Madagascar
- Hermacha Simon, 1889 – Mozambique, South Africa, Zimbabwe, Brazil, Colombia
- Hermachola Hewitt, 1915 – South Africa
- Lepthercus Purcell, 1902 – South Africa
