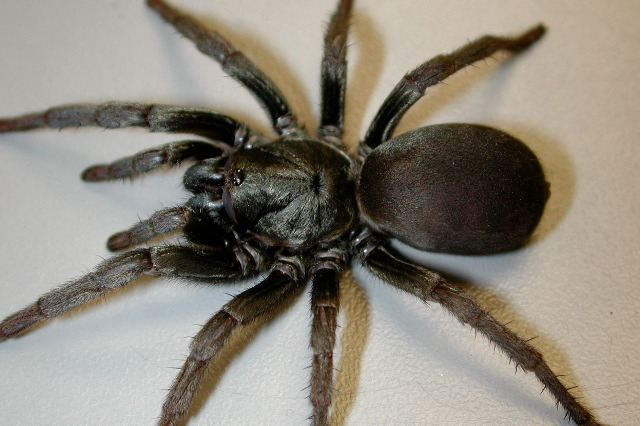
- Calisoga sp.

Scientific classification
- Kingdom: Animalia
- Phylum: Arthropoda
- Subphylum: Chelicerata
- Class: Arachnida
- Order: Araneae
- Infraorder: Mygalomorphae
- Clade: Avicularioidea
- Family: Nemesiidae; Simon, 1892

Diversity
- 10 genera, 154 species
- blue: reported countries (WSC) green: observation hotspots (iNaturalist)

= Nemesiidae =

Nemesiidae Temporal range: Eocene–present

Family of spiders

Nemesiidae is a family of mygalomorph spiders first described by Eugène Simon in 1889, and raised to family status in 1985. Before becoming its own family, it was considered part of "Dipluridae". The family is sometimes referred to as wishbone spiders due to the shape of their burrows.

== Description ==
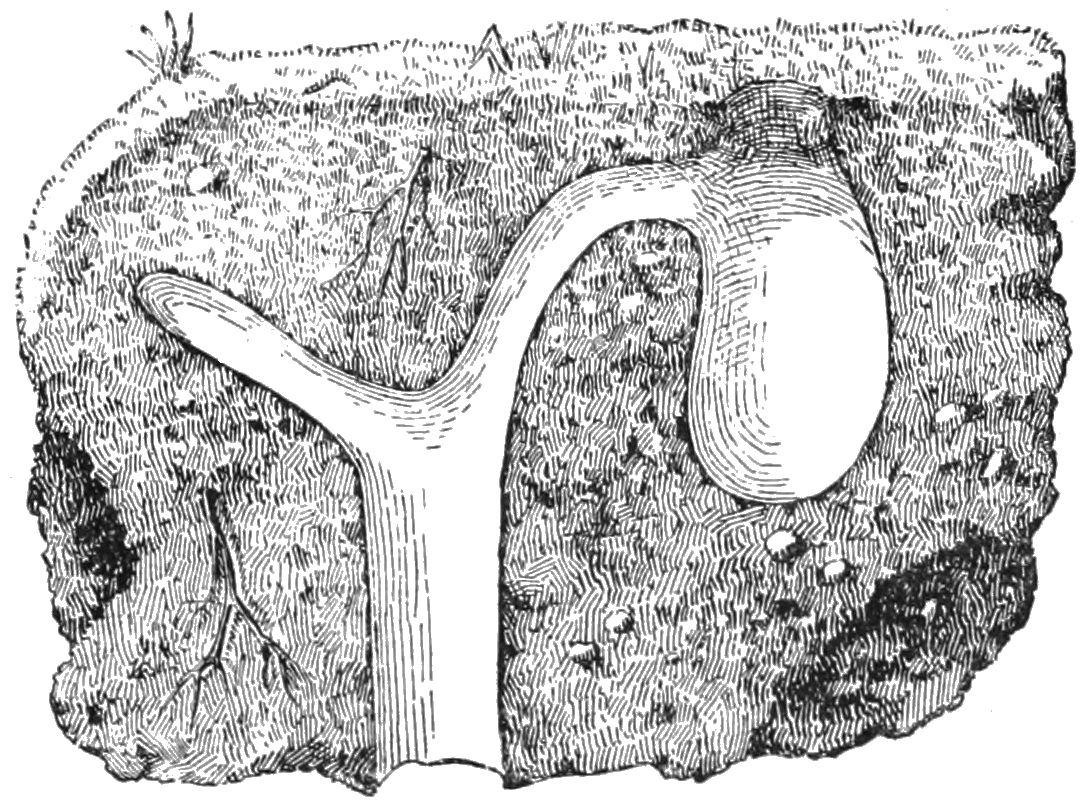
Burrow of Nemesia cavicola

Nemesiidae are relatively large spiders with robust legs and a body that is nearly three times as long as it is wide. They are darkly colored, brown to black, though some have silvery hairs on their carapace. Atmetochilus females can grow over 4 centimetres (1.6 in) long.

They live in burrows, often with a hinged trapdoor. This door is pushed up while the spider waits for passing prey. They rarely leave their burrows, catching prey and withdrawing as quickly as possible. Some of these burrows have side tubes. For the east-Asian genus Sinopesa it is uncertain whether it builds burrows at all.

== Genera ==
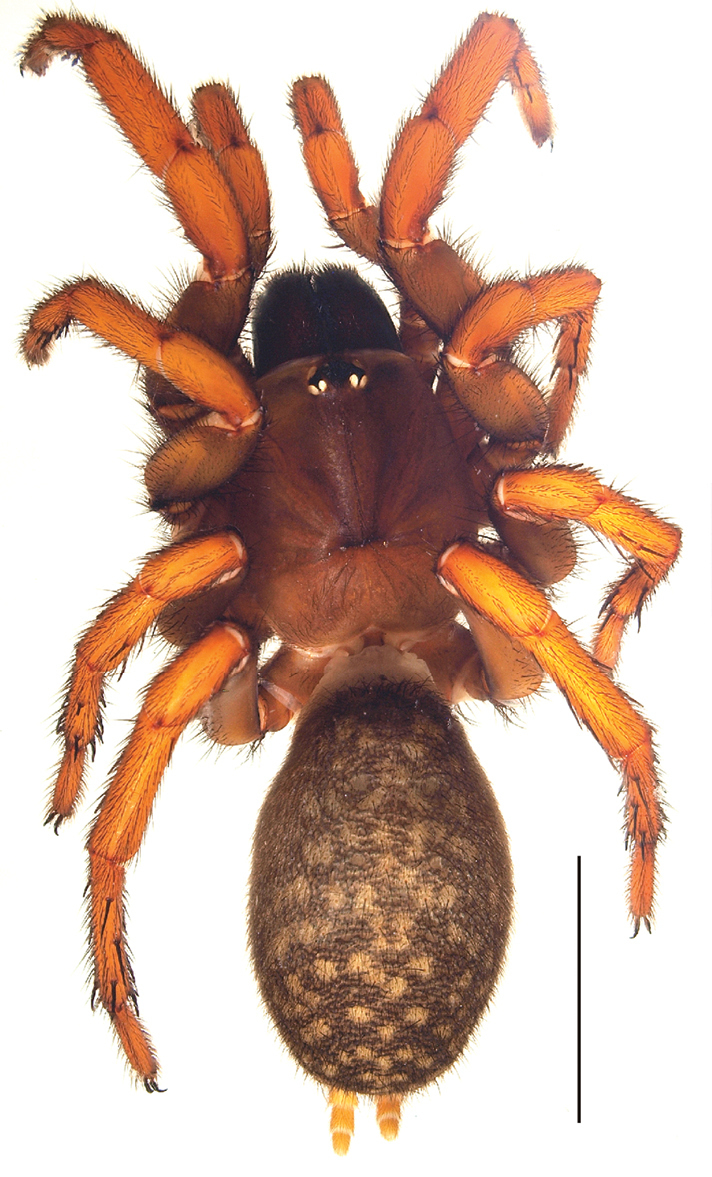
Raveniola chayi, female

As of January 2026, this family includes ten genera and 195 species:

- Amblyocarenum Simon, 1892 – Algeria, Tunisia, Italy, Spain
- Brachythele Ausserer, 1871 – Turkey, Europe
- Calisoga Chamberlin, 1937 – United States
- Damarchilus Siliwal, Molur & Raven, 2015 – India
- Gravelyia Mirza & Mondal, 2018 – India
- Iberesia Decae & Cardoso, 2006 – Algeria, Morocco, Portugal, Spain
- Mexentypesa Raven, 1987 – Mexico
- Nemesia Audouin, 1826 – Mozambique, Algeria?, Morocco?, China, Europe, Cuba
- Raveniola Zonstein, 1987 – Asia, Russia
- Sinopesa Raven & Schwendinger, 1995 – China, Japan, Thailand, Vietnam

Transferred to other families:

- Acanthogonatus Karsch, 1880 → Pycnothelidae
- Atmetochilus Simon, 1887 → Bemmeridae
- Aname L. Koch, 1873 → Anamidae
- Bayana Pérez-Miles, Costa & Montes de Oca, 2014 → Pycnothelidae
- Chenistonia Hogg, 1901 → Anamidae
- Chaco Tullgren, 1905 → Pycnothelidae
- Chilelopsis Goloboff, 1995 → Pycnothelidae
- Damarchus Thorell, 1891 → Bemmeridae
- Diplothelopsis Tullgren, 1905 → Pycnothelidae
- Entypesa Simon, 1902 → Entypesidae
- Flamencopsis Goloboff, 1995 → Pycnothelidae
- Hermacha Simon, 1889 → Entypesidae
- Hermachura Mello-Leitão, 1923 → Pycnothelidae
- Hesperonatalius Castalanelli, Huey, Hillyer & Harvey, 2017 → Anamidae
- Ixamatus Simon, 1887 → Microstigmatidae
- Kiama Main & Mascord, 1969 → Microstigmatidae
- Kwonkan Main, 1983 → Anamidae
- Lepthercus Purcell, 1902 → Entypesidae
- Longistylus Indicatti & Lucas, 2005 → Pycnothelidae
- Lycinus Thorell, 1894 → Pycnothelidae
- Namea Raven, 1984 → Anamidae
- Neostothis Vellard, 1925 → Pycnothelidae
- Pionothele Purcell, 1902 → Pycnothelidae
- Prorachias Mello-Leitão, 1924 → Pycnothelidae
- Proshermacha Simon, 1908 → Anamidae
- Psalistopoides Mello-Leitão, 1934 → Pycnothelidae
- Pselligmus Simon, 1892 → Pycnothelidae
- Pycnothele Chamberlin, 1917 → Pycnothelidae
- Rachias Simon, 1892 → Pycnothelidae
- Spiroctenus Simon, 1889 → Bemmeridae
- Stanwellia Rainbow & Pulleine, 1918 → Pycnothelidae
- Stenoterommata Holmberg, 1881 → Pycnothelidae
- Swolnpes Main & Framenau, 2009 → Anamidae
- Teyl Main, 1975 → Anamidae
- Teyloides Main, 1985 → Anamidae
- Xamiatus Raven, 1981 → Microstigmatidae

=== Extinct genera ===
†Eodiplurina Petrunkevitch 1922 Florissant Formation, United States, Eocene
