= Entypesa =

Scientific classification
- Kingdom: Animalia
- Phylum: Arthropoda
- Subphylum: Chelicerata
- Class: Arachnida
- Order: Araneae
- Infraorder: Mygalomorphae
- Family: Entypesidae
- Genus: Entypesa; Simon, 1902

Type species
- E. nebulosa Simon, 1902

Species
- 6, see text

Synonyms
- Pseudohermacha Strand, 1907

Genus of spiders

Entypesa is a genus of African mygalomorph spiders in the family Entypesidae. It was first described by Eugène Louis Simon in 1902. Originally placed with the curtain-web spiders, it was transferred to the funnel-web trapdoor spiders in 1985, then to the Entypesidae in 2020. It is a senior synonym of Pseudohermacha.

== Species ==
As of June 2020 it contains six species, found in South Africa and on Madagascar:

- Entypesa andohahela Zonstein, 2018 – Madagascar
- Entypesa enakara Zonstein, 2018 – Madagascar
- Entypesa fisheri Zonstein, 2018 – Madagascar
- Entypesa nebulosa Simon, 1902 (type) – Madagascar
- Entypesa rastellata Zonstein, 2018 – Madagascar
- Entypesa schoutedeni Benoit, 1965 – South Africa

Nomen dubium

- E. annulipes (Strand, 1907)
