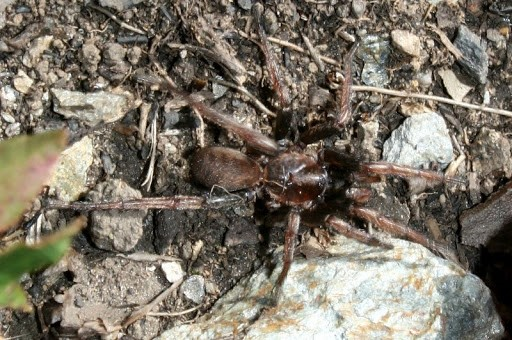
- Nemesia simoni

Scientific classification
- Domain: Eukaryota
- Kingdom: Animalia
- Phylum: Arthropoda
- Subphylum: Chelicerata
- Class: Arachnida
- Order: Araneae
- Infraorder: Mygalomorphae
- Family: Nemesiidae
- Genus: Nemesia; Audouin, 1826

Type species
- N. cellicola Audouin, 1826

Species
- 71, see text

Synonyms
- Leptopelma

= Nemesia (spider) =

Genus of spiders

Nemesia is a genus of mygalomorph spiders in the family Nemesiidae, first described by Jean Victoire Audouin in 1826.

== Species ==
As of April 2025 it contains 79 species:

- N. africana (C. L. Koch, 1838) — Algeria
- N. albicomis Simon, 1914 — France (Corsica)
- N. algerina Zonstein, 2019 — Algeria
- N. almoravida Zonstein, 2019 — Algeria
- N. amicitia (Pertegal & Molero-Baltanás, 2022) — Spain
- N. angustata Simon, 1873 — Spain
- N. annaba Zonstein, 2019 — Algeria
- N. apenninica Decae, Pantini & Isaia, 2015 — Italy
- N. arboricola Pocock, 1903 — Malta
- N. arenicola Simon, 1892 — France (Corsica)
- N. asterix Decae & Huber, 2017 — Italy (Sardinia)
- N. athiasi Franganillo, 1920 — Portugal, Spain
- N. bacelarae Decae, Cardoso & Selden, 2007 — Portugal, Spain
- N. berlandi Frade & Bacelar, 1931 — Portugal
- N. bonali Pertegal & Rodríguez-Castilla, 2024 — Portugal
- N. bosmansi Decae, 2024 — Italy
- N. bristowei Decae, 2005 — Spain (Majorca)
- N. budensis Kolosváry, 1939 — Hungary
- N. caementaria (Latreille, 1799) — Southern Europe
- N. caranhaci Decae, 1995 — Greece (Crete)
- N. carminans (Latreille, 1818) — France
- N. cecconii Kulczyński, 1907 — Italy
- N. cellicola Audouin, 1826 (type) — Mediterranean
- N. coheni Fuhn & Polenec, 1967 — Romania, Bulgaria
- N. cominensis (Cassar, Mifsud & Decae, 2022) — Malta
- N. congener O. Pickard-Cambridge, 1874 — France
- N. corsica Simon, 1914 — France (Corsica)
- N. crassimana Simon, 1873 — Spain
- N. cubana (Franganillo, 1930) — Cuba
- N. cypriatica (Özkütük, Yağmur, Elverici, Gücel, Altunsoy & Kunt, 2022) — Cyprus
- N. daedali Decae, 1995 — Greece (Crete)
- N. decaei Zonstein, 2019 — Algeria
- N. didieri Simon, 1892 — Algeria
- N. dido Zonstein, 2019 — Algeria
- N. dorthesi Thorell, 1875 — Spain, Morocco, Algeria
- N. dubia (Karsch, 1878) — Mozambique
- N. dubia O. Pickard-Cambridge, 1874 — Spain, France
- N. eleanora O. Pickard-Cambridge, 1873 — France
- N. entinae (Calvo & Pagán, 2022) — Spain
- N. fagei Frade & Bacelar, 1931 — Portugal
- N. fertoni Simon, 1914 — France (Corsica), Italy (Sardinia)
  - N. f. sardinea Simon, 1914 — Italy (Sardinia)
- N. hastensis Decae, Pantini & Isaia, 2015 — Italy
- N. hesperides Pertegal & Pinilla Rosa, 2023 — Spain
- N. hispanica L. Koch, 1871 — Spain
- N. hoyensis Luis de la Iglesia, 2024 — Spain
- N. ibiza Decae, 2005 — Spain (Ibiza)
- N. ilvae Caporiacco, 1950 — Italy
- N. incerta O. Pickard-Cambridge, 1874 — France
- N. kahmanni Kraus, 1955 — Italy (Sardinia)
- N. laminia Luis de la Iglesia, 2024 — Spain
- N. macrocephala Ausserer, 1871 — Italy (Sicily), Malta, Algeria?
  - N. m. occidentalis Frade & Bacelar, 1931 — Spain
- N. maculatipes Ausserer, 1871 — France (Corsica), Italy (Sardinia), Morocco?
- N. maltensis (Cassar, Mifsud & Decae, 2022) — Malta
- N. manderstjernae L. Koch, 1871 — France
- N. meridionalis (Costa, 1835) — Spain, France, Italy, Algeria?
- N. molerobaltanasi Pertegal & Rodríguez-Castilla, 2024
- N. pannonica Herman, 1879 — Eastern Europe
- N. pavani Dresco, 1978 — Italy
- N. pedemontana Decae, Pantini & Isaia, 2015 — Italy
- N. qarthadasht (Calvo, 2021) — Spain
- N. randa Decae, 2005 — Spain (Majorca)
- N. raripila Simon, 1914 — Spain, France
- N. rastellata Wunderlich, 2011 — Greece (Karpathos)
- N. rebellis Pertegal & Rodríguez-Castilla, 2024 — Portugal
- N. santeugenia Decae, 2005 — Spain (Majorca)
- N. santeulalia Decae, 2005 — Spain (Ibiza)
- N. sanzoi Fage, 1917 — Italy (Sicily)
- N. seldeni Decae, 2005 — Spain (Majorca)
- N. shenlongi (Pertegal, García, Molero-Baltanás & Knapp, 2022) — Spain
- N. simoni O. Pickard-Cambridge, 1874 — Portugal, Spain, France
- N. sinensis Pocock, 1901 — China
- N. tanit Zonstein, 2019 — Algeria
- N. transalpina (Doleschall, 1871) — Italy
- N. uncinata Bacelar, 1933 — Portugal, Spain
- N. ungoliant Decae, Cardoso & Selden, 2007 — Portugal
- N. valenciae Kraus, 1955 — Spain, Morocco
- N. vallejerensis Luis de la Iglesia, 2024 — Spain
