= Rachias =

Scientific classification
- Kingdom: Animalia
- Phylum: Arthropoda
- Subphylum: Chelicerata
- Class: Arachnida
- Order: Araneae
- Infraorder: Mygalomorphae
- Family: Pycnothelidae
- Genus: Rachias; Simon, 1892

Genus of spiders

Rachias is a genus of spiders in the family Pycnothelidae, found in Brazil and Argentina.

== Species ==
As of January 2022, the World Spider Catalog accepted 11 species:

- Rachias aureus (Mello-Leitão, 1920) – Brazil
- Rachias brachythelus (Mello-Leitão, 1937) – Brazil
- Rachias caudatus (Piza, 1939) – Brazil
- Rachias conspersus (Walckenaer, 1837) – Brazil
- Rachias dispar (Simon, 1891) (type species) – Brazil
- Rachias dolichosternus (Mello-Leitão, 1938) – Brazil
- Rachias iricolor (Mello-Leitão, 1923) – Brazil
- Rachias odontochilus Mello-Leitão, 1923 – Brazil
- Rachias piracicabensis Piza, 1938 – Brazil
- Rachias timbo Goloboff, 1995 – Argentina
- Rachias virgatus Vellard, 1924 – Brazil
