= Brachythele =

Scientific classification
- Kingdom: Animalia
- Phylum: Arthropoda
- Subphylum: Chelicerata
- Class: Arachnida
- Order: Araneae
- Infraorder: Mygalomorphae
- Family: Nemesiidae
- Genus: Brachythele; Ausserer

Type species
- Brachythele icterica

Species
- See text.

Genus of spiders

Brachythele is a genus of spiders in the family Nemesiidae. It was first described in 1871 by Ausserer. As of 2022, it contains about ten species from eastern Europe.

== Species ==
As of June 2026, the World Spider Catalog accepted the following species:

- Brachythele bentzieni Zonstein, 2007 — Greece
- Brachythele denieri (Simon, 1916) — Greece, Bulgaria
- Brachythele icterica (C. L. Koch, 1838) (type) — Italy, Croatia, North Macedonia
- Brachythele incerta Ausserer, 1871 — Cyprus
- Brachythele kosovarica Geci & Sherwood, 2025 — Kosovo
- Brachythele langourovi Lazarov, 2005 — Bulgaria
- Brachythele media Kulczyński, 1897 — Slovenia, Croatia, Albania
- Brachythele rhodopensis (Dimitrov & Zonstein, 2022) — Bulgaria
- Brachythele speculatrix Kulczyński, 1897 — SE Europe (Balkans)
- Brachythele varrialei (Dalmas, 1920) — Eastern Europe
- Brachythele zonsteini (Özkütük, Yağmur, Elverici, Gücel, Altunsoy & Kunt, 2022) — Turkey
