= List of Microstigmatidae species =

This page lists all described species of the spider family Microstigmatidae accepted by the World Spider Catalog as of January 2021:

== A ==
=== Angka ===
Angka Raven & Schwendinger, 1995

- A. hexops Raven & Schwendinger, 1995 (type) — Thailand

== E ==
=== Envia ===
Envia Ott & Höfer, 2003

- E. garciai Ott & Höfer, 2003 (type) — Brazil
- E. moleque Miglio & Bonaldo, 2011 — Brazil

== I ==
=== Ixamatus ===
Ixamatus Simon, 1887

- I. barina Raven, 1982 — Australia (Queensland)
- I. broomi Hogg, 1901 — Australia (Queensland, New South Wales)
- I. caldera Raven, 1982 — Australia (Queensland, New South Wales)
- I. candidus Raven, 1982 — Australia (Queensland, New South Wales)
- I. fischeri Raven, 1982 — Australia (New South Wales)
- I. lornensis Raven, 1985 — Australia (New South Wales)
- I. musgravei Raven, 1982 — Australia (New South Wales)
- I. rozefeldsi Raven, 1985 — Australia (Queensland)
- I. varius (L. Koch, 1873) (type) — Australia (Queensland)
- I. webbae Raven, 1982 — Australia (Queensland, New South Wales)

== K ==
=== Kiama ===
Kiama Main & Mascord, 1969

- K. lachrymoides Main & Mascord, 1969 (type) — Australia (New South Wales)

== M ==
=== Micromygale ===
Micromygale Platnick & Forster, 1982

- M. diblemma Platnick & Forster, 1982 (type) — Panama

=== Microstigmata ===
Microstigmata Strand, 1932

- M. amatola Griswold, 1985 — South Africa
- M. geophila (Hewitt, 1916) (type) — South Africa
- M. lawrencei Griswold, 1985 — South Africa
- M. longipes (Lawrence, 1938) — South Africa
- M. ukhahlamba Griswold, 1985 — South Africa
- M. zuluensis (Lawrence, 1938) — South Africa

=== Ministigmata ===
Ministigmata Raven & Platnick, 1981

- M. minuta Raven & Platnick, 1981 (type) — Brazil

== P ==
=== † Parvomygale ===
† Parvomygale Wunderlich, 2004

- † P. distincta Wunderlich, 2004

=== Pseudonemesia ===
Pseudonemesia Caporiacco, 1955

- P. kochalkai Raven & Platnick, 1981 — Colombia
- P. parva Caporiacco, 1955 (type) — Venezuela
- P. tabiskey Indicatti & Villareal M., 2016 — Venezuela

== S ==
=== Spelocteniza ===
Spelocteniza Gertsch, 1982

- S. ashmolei Gertsch, 1982 (type) — Ecuador

== T ==
=== Tonton ===
Tonton Passanha, Cizauskas & Brescovit, 2019

- T. emboaba (Pedroso, Baptista & Bertani, 2015) — Brazil
- T. ipiau Passanha, Cizauskas & Brescovit, 2019 — Brazil
- T. itabirito Passanha, Cizauskas & Brescovit, 2019 (type) — Brazil
- T. matodentro Passanha, Cizauskas & Brescovit, 2019 — Brazil
- T. queca Passanha, Cizauskas & Brescovit, 2019 — Brazil
- T. quiteria Passanha, Cizauskas & Brescovit, 2019 — Brazil
- T. sapalo Passanha, Cizauskas & Brescovit, 2019 — Brazil

== X ==
=== Xamiatus ===
Xamiatus Raven, 1981

- X. bulburin Raven, 1981 — Australia (Queensland)
- X. ilara Raven, 1982 — Australia (Queensland)
- X. kia Raven, 1981 — Australia (New South Wales)
- X. magnificus Raven, 1981 — Australia (Queensland)
- X. rubrifrons Raven, 1981 (type) — Australia (Queensland)

=== Xenonemesia ===
Xenonemesia Goloboff, 1989

- X. araucaria Indicatti, Lucas, Ott & Brescovit, 2008 — Brazil
- X. otti Indicatti, Lucas & Brescovit, 2007 — Brazil
- X. platensis Goloboff, 1989 (type) — Brazil, Uruguay, Argentina
