= Sason hirsutum =

Scientific classification
- Domain: Eukaryota
- Kingdom: Animalia
- Phylum: Arthropoda
- Subphylum: Chelicerata
- Class: Arachnida
- Order: Araneae
- Infraorder: Mygalomorphae
- Family: Barychelidae
- Genus: Sason
- Species: S. hirsutum

Binomial name
- Sason hirsutum Schwendinger, 2003

Species of spider

Sason hirsutum is a species of spiders in the family Barychelidae, found in Indonesia.

== Description ==
Only the male has been described. Its body is about 9 mm long in total. The upper (dorsal) surface is generally light reddish brown; the lower (ventral) surface is lighter. The abdomen has a darker pattern on both surfaces. The ventral surface of the tarsus and part of the metatarsus of each leg is white. The legs are densely covered with relatively long hairs.

== Taxonomy ==
Sason hirsutum was first described by Peter J. Schwendinger in 2003. The species name, hirsutum, meaning "hairy", refers to the long dense hair on the legs. The male is similar to S. andamanicum, but can be distinguished by a number of features, including the short, stout cuspules on the labium and maxillae, and the thinner, straight embolus of the palpal bulb.

== Distribution and habitat ==
The species is only known from one of the Lingga Islands off the east coast of Sumatra, Indonesia. The males were found in tropical rainforest alongside a stream, in nests on the trunks of trees.
