= Sason sundaicum =

Scientific classification
- Domain: Eukaryota
- Kingdom: Animalia
- Phylum: Arthropoda
- Subphylum: Chelicerata
- Class: Arachnida
- Order: Araneae
- Infraorder: Mygalomorphae
- Family: Barychelidae
- Genus: Sason
- Species: S. sundaicum

Binomial name
- Sason sundaicum Schwendinger, 2003

Trapdoor spider from Southeast Asia

Sason sundaicum is a species of barychelid trapdoor spiders that is found on trees near the sea, usually closer than 100 metres, although distances of up to five kilometres have been observed.

They build short nests with two opposing trapdoors, often attached to the bark of living trees, for example Coconut Palms. However, sometimes a nest is built on sides of large boulders. Nests of males are up to two cm long, those of females up to almost three cm. The migid spider Poecilomigas abrahami from South Africa builds very similar nests.

They are found in parts of Malaysia and Thailand.
