= Poecilomigas elegans =

Scientific classification
- Kingdom: Animalia
- Phylum: Arthropoda
- Subphylum: Chelicerata
- Class: Arachnida
- Order: Araneae
- Infraorder: Mygalomorphae
- Family: Migidae
- Genus: Poecilomigas
- Species: P. elegans

Binomial name
- Poecilomigas elegans Griswold, 1987

Species of spider

Poecilomigas elegans is a species of spider in the family Migidae. It is endemic to KwaZulu-Natal province of South Africa.

== Distribution ==
Poecilomigas elegans is known only from its type locality at Eshowe in KwaZulu-Natal province, South Africa.

== Habitat ==
The species inhabits the Indian Ocean Coastal Belt biome at an altitude of 527 m above sea level.

== Description ==
Poecilomigas elegans is known only from the male. The opisthosoma dorsum is pale with antero-median dark diamond and chevron pattern, distinguishing it from P. abrahami which has broad, dark bands.

== Conservation ==
Poecilomigas elegans is listed as Data Deficient due to taxonomic reasons. The species is known only from the type collection of a single male. The female remains unknown, and additional sampling is needed to determine the species' range.

== Taxonomy ==
The species was described by Charles E. Griswold in 1987 during his revision of the genus Poecilomigas.
