= Angka =

Angka may refer to:

- Angka (spider), a spider genus
- Communist Party of Kampuchea, also called Angka or Angkar
