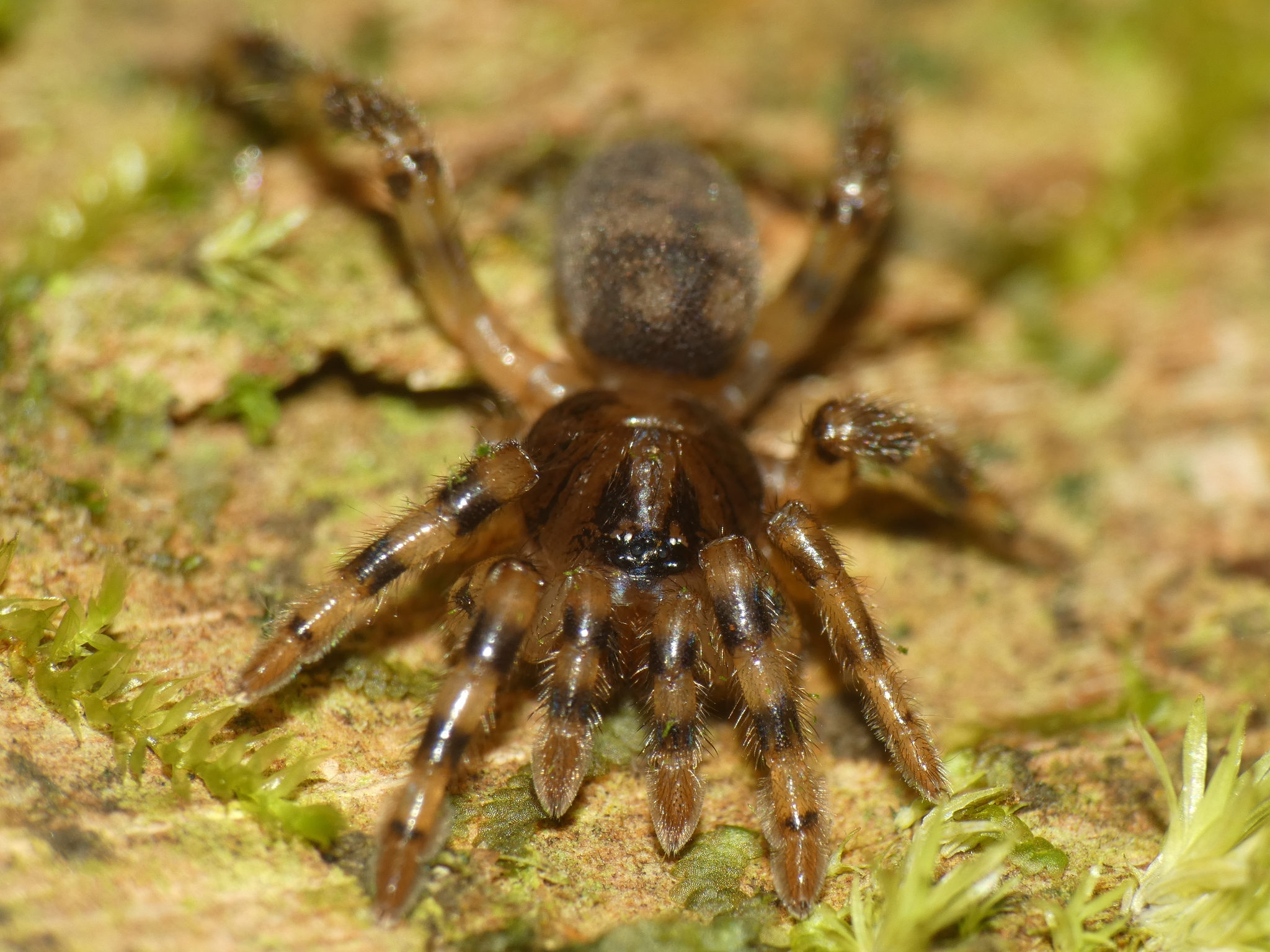

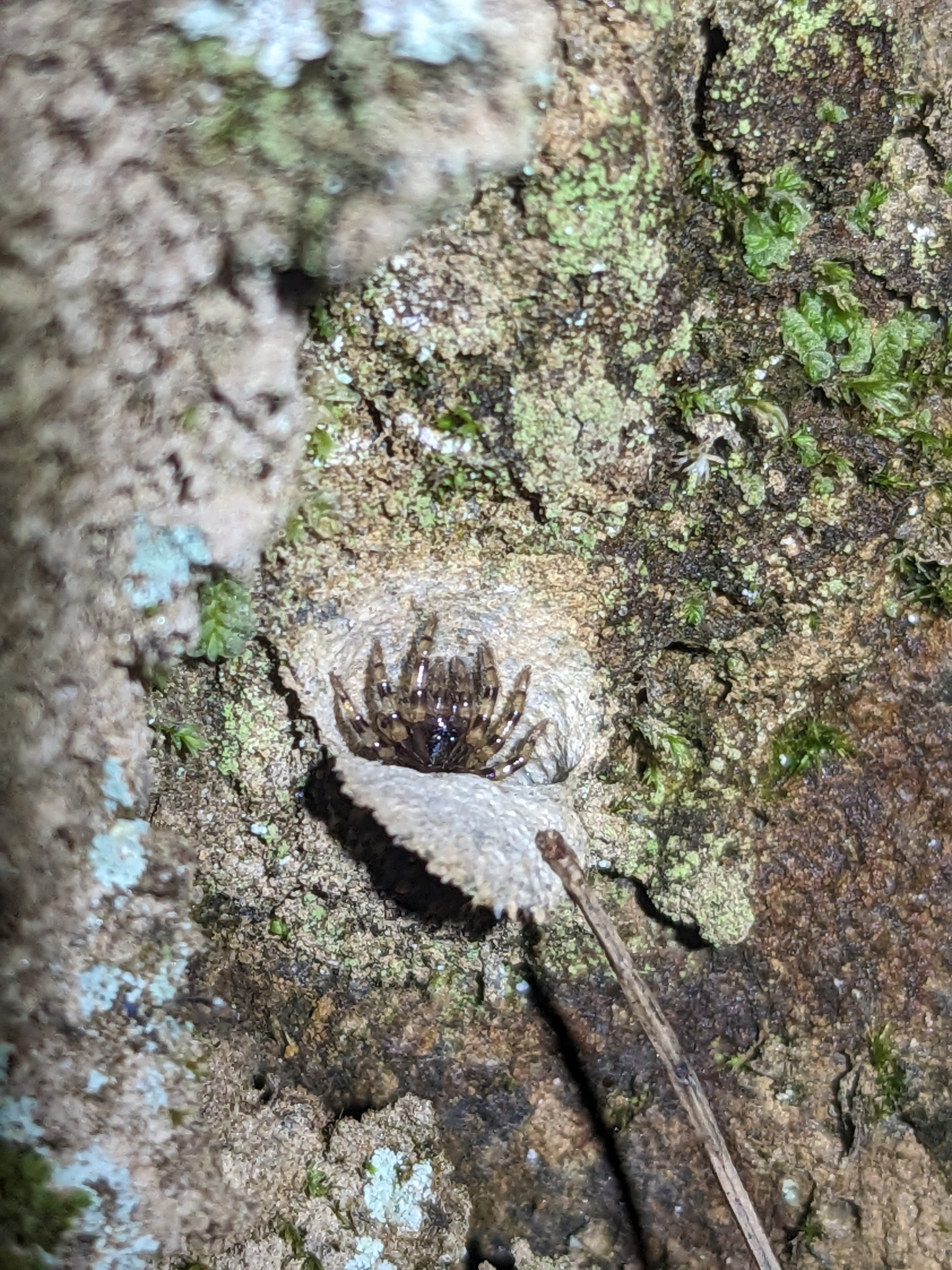

Scientific classification
- Kingdom: Animalia
- Phylum: Arthropoda
- Subphylum: Chelicerata
- Class: Arachnida
- Order: Araneae
- Infraorder: Mygalomorphae
- Family: Barychelidae
- Genus: Sason
- Species: S. colemani

Binomial name
- Sason colemani Raven, 1986

= Sason colemani =

Species of spider

Sason colemani is a species of barychelid trapdoor spiders that has only been found in a natural swamp in the Botanical Gardens in Cairns, Queensland. Its retreat is a short tube with a door at each end which it builds on the bark of trees. When one door opens, the other is pressed closed. Paracenobiopelma gerecormophilum and spiders of the genus Cyphonisia build similar but slightly longer retreats.

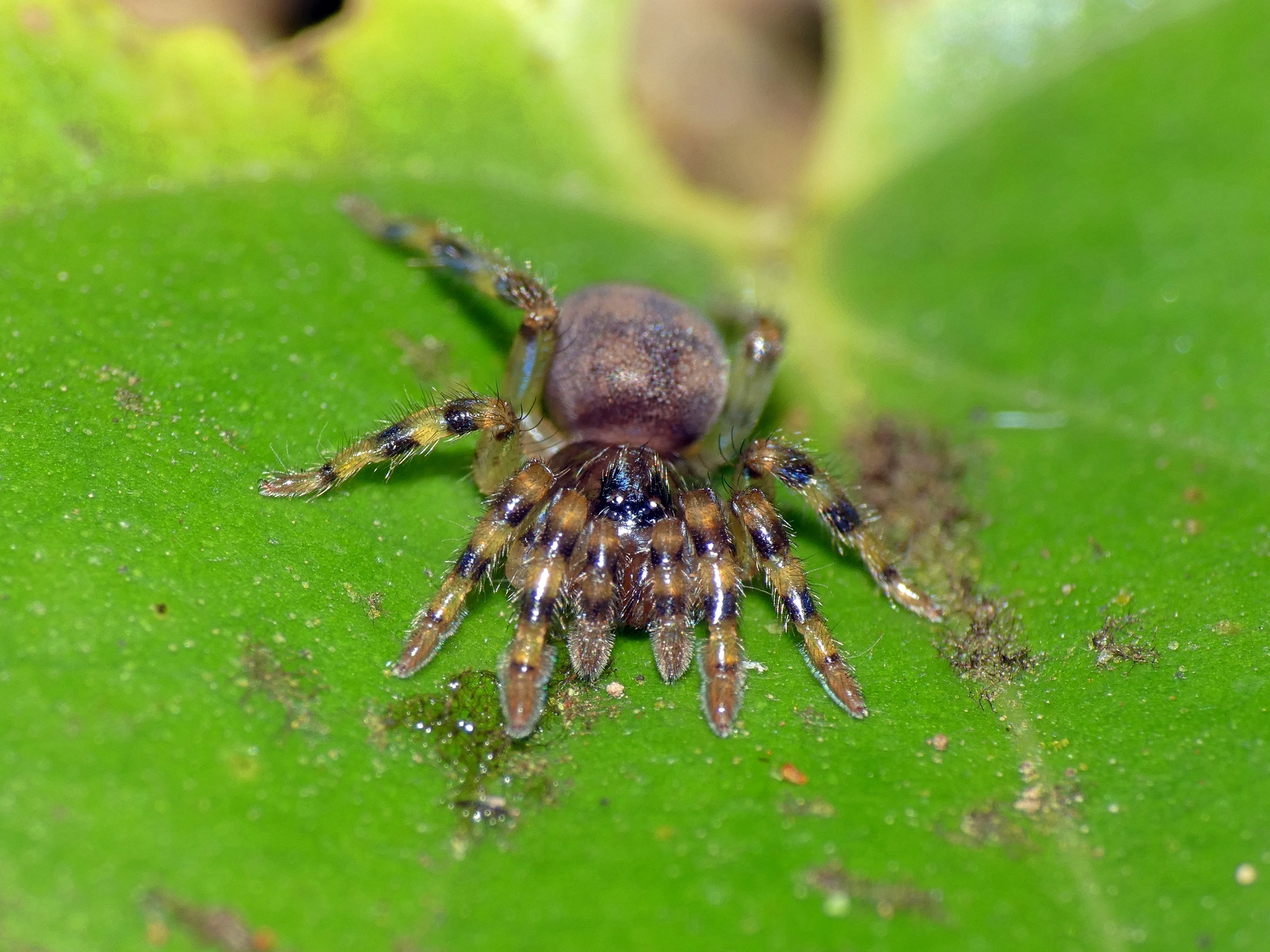

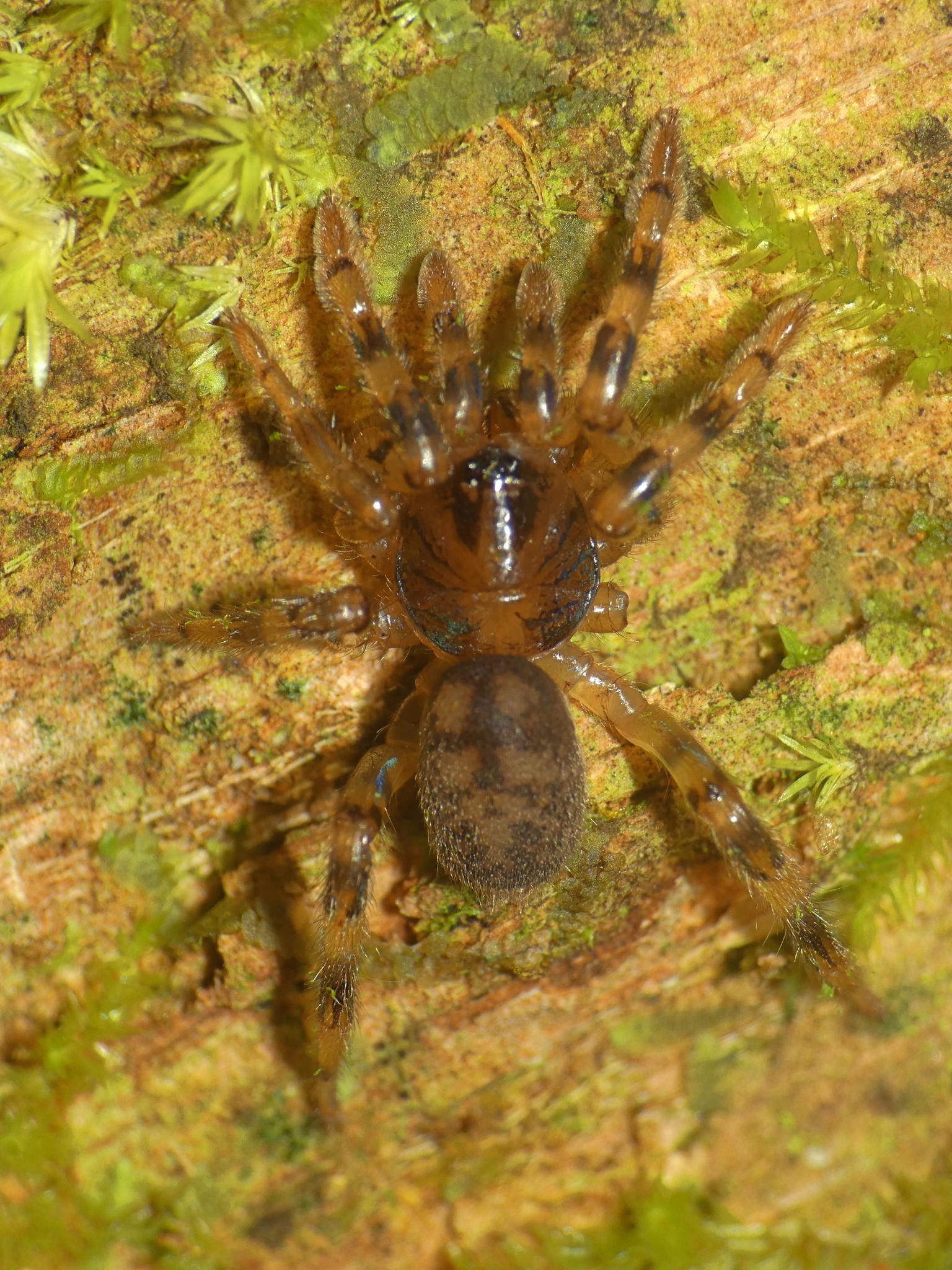
