= Kiama (disambiguation) =

Kiama is a town in New South Wales.

Kiama may also refer to:

- Electoral district of Kiama, a seat in the New South Wales Legislative Assembly
- Kiama lachrymoides, a genus of spider
- Municipality of Kiama, a local government area
- NSW Kiama, a steam locomotive
