= Pastaza =

Pastaza may refer to:

- Pastaza River of Ecuador and Peru
- Pastaza Province, Ecuador
- Pastaza (spider), a genus of spiders in the family Microstigmatidae
