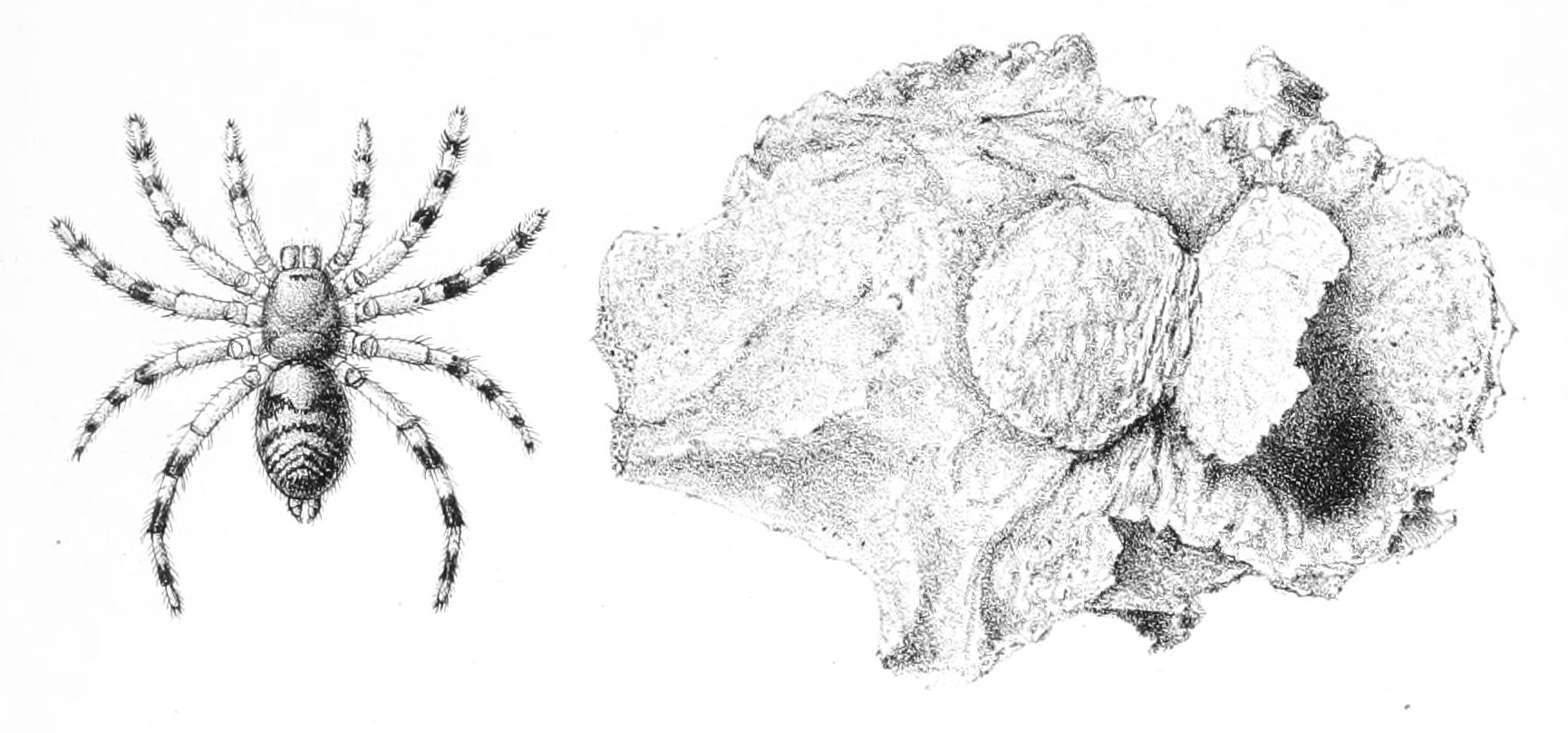
- Sason robustum, adult and its nest

Scientific classification
- Kingdom: Animalia
- Phylum: Arthropoda
- Subphylum: Chelicerata
- Class: Arachnida
- Order: Araneae
- Infraorder: Mygalomorphae
- Family: Barychelidae
- Genus: Sason; Simon, 1887

Type species
- Sarpedon robustum O. P-Cambridge, 1883

Species
- 9, see text

Synonyms
- Chrysopelma Roewer, 1963

= Sason (spider) =

Genus of spiders

Sason is a genus of bark-dwelling brushed trapdoor spiders first described by Eugène Simon in 1887. It is distributed from the Seychelles through India to northern Australia. The closest related genus seems to be the monotypic Paracenobiopelma.

== Description ==
These are small, compact spiders, ranging from 5 to 10 millimetres (0.20 to 0.39 in) long. They are strongly patterned and have stout legs, physically resembling those of the tree trapdoor spiders.

== Distribution ==
Most species are endemic small areas, many of which are small islands that emerged from the ocean floor in recent geological times with no connection to the mainland. These were likely inhabited by pregnant females surviving in floating logs, while most of the other speciation is believed to have occurred due to fragmentation of the former supercontinent Gondwana.

== Taxonomy ==
The genus was erected by Octavius Pickard-Cambridge in 1883 for the type species Sarpedon robustum, but this name was already in use for a genus of false click beetles. In 1887, Eugène Simon renamed the genus to Sason, an abbreviation of the biblical judge Samson. The earlier name was based on Sarpedon, a legendary king at the siege of Troy, alluding to their "regal" appearance.

=== Species ===
As of April 2019 it contains nine species:

- Sason andamanicum (Simon, 1888) – India (Andaman Is.)
- Sason colemani Raven, 1986 – Australia (Queensland)
- Sason hirsutum Schwendinger, 2003 – Indonesia
- Sason maculatum (Roewer, 1963) – Mariana Is., Caroline Is.
- Sason pectinatum Kulczyński, 1908 – New Guinea
- Sason rameshwaram Siliwal & Molur, 2009 – India
- Sason robustum (O. Pickard-Cambridge, 1883) (type) – India, Sri Lanka, Seychelles
- Sason sechellanum Simon, 1898 – Seychelles
- Sason sundaicum Schwendinger, 2003 – Thailand, Malaysia
