= Ixamatus rozefeldsi =

Scientific classification
- Kingdom: Animalia
- Phylum: Arthropoda
- Subphylum: Chelicerata
- Class: Arachnida
- Order: Araneae
- Infraorder: Mygalomorphae
- Family: Microstigmatidae
- Genus: Ixamatus
- Species: I. rozefeldsi

Binomial name
- Ixamatus rozefeldsi Raven, 1985

Species of spider

Ixamatus rozefeldsi is a species of mygalomorph spider in the Microstigmatidae family. It is endemic to Australia. It was described in 1985 by Australian arachnologist Robert Raven. The specific epithet rozefeldsi honours Andrew Rozefelds, a collector of mygalomorphs.

== Description ==
The holotype male has a carapace 8.25 mm long by 8.13 mm wide, and abdomen 9.70 mm long by 6.00 mm wide. The carapace, legs and chelicerae are red-brown in colour; the upper abdomen is brown and white, mainly cream below.

== Distribution and habitat ==
The species occurs in Central Queensland. The type locality is a gully in low rainforest in Byfield, near Rockhampton.
