= Ixamatus lornensis =

Scientific classification
- Kingdom: Animalia
- Phylum: Arthropoda
- Subphylum: Chelicerata
- Class: Arachnida
- Order: Araneae
- Infraorder: Mygalomorphae
- Family: Microstigmatidae
- Genus: Ixamatus
- Species: I. lornensis

Binomial name
- Ixamatus lornensis Raven, 1985

Species of spider

Ixamatus lornensis is a species of mygalomorph spider in the Microstigmatidae family. It is endemic to Australia. It was described in 1985 by Australian arachnologist Robert Raven. The specific epithet refers to the type locality.

== Description ==
The holotype male has a total length of 11.88 mm. The carapace, legs and chelicerae are orange-brown in colour; the upper abdomen is brown with white mottling and mainly white below.

== Distribution and habitat ==
The species occurs in north-eastern New South Wales. The type locality is rainforest in Lorne State Forest, in the Mid North Coast region.
