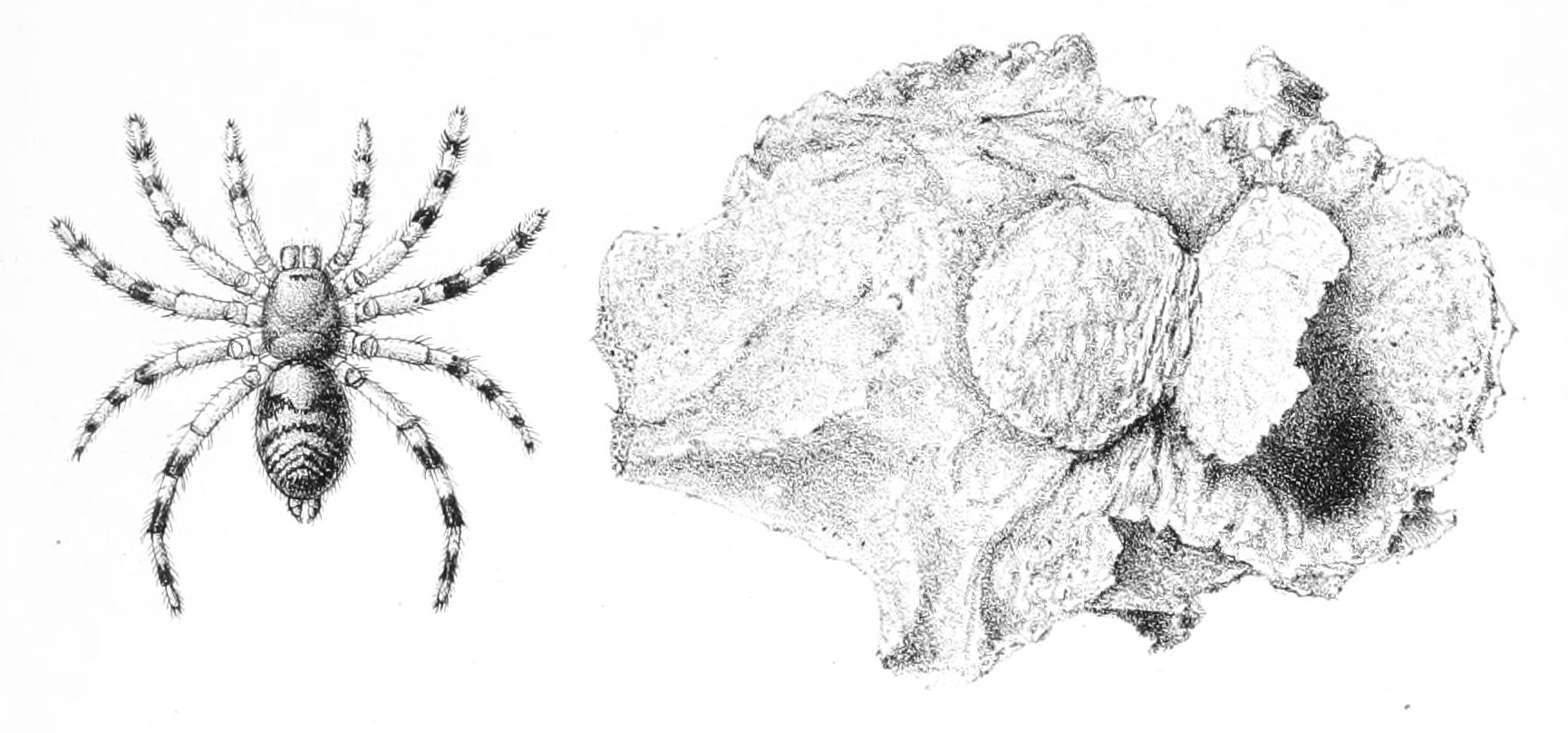
- Adult and its nest

Scientific classification
- Kingdom: Animalia
- Phylum: Arthropoda
- Subphylum: Chelicerata
- Class: Arachnida
- Order: Araneae
- Infraorder: Mygalomorphae
- Family: Barychelidae
- Genus: Sason
- Species: S. robustum

Binomial name
- Sason robustum (O. P-Cambridge, 1883)
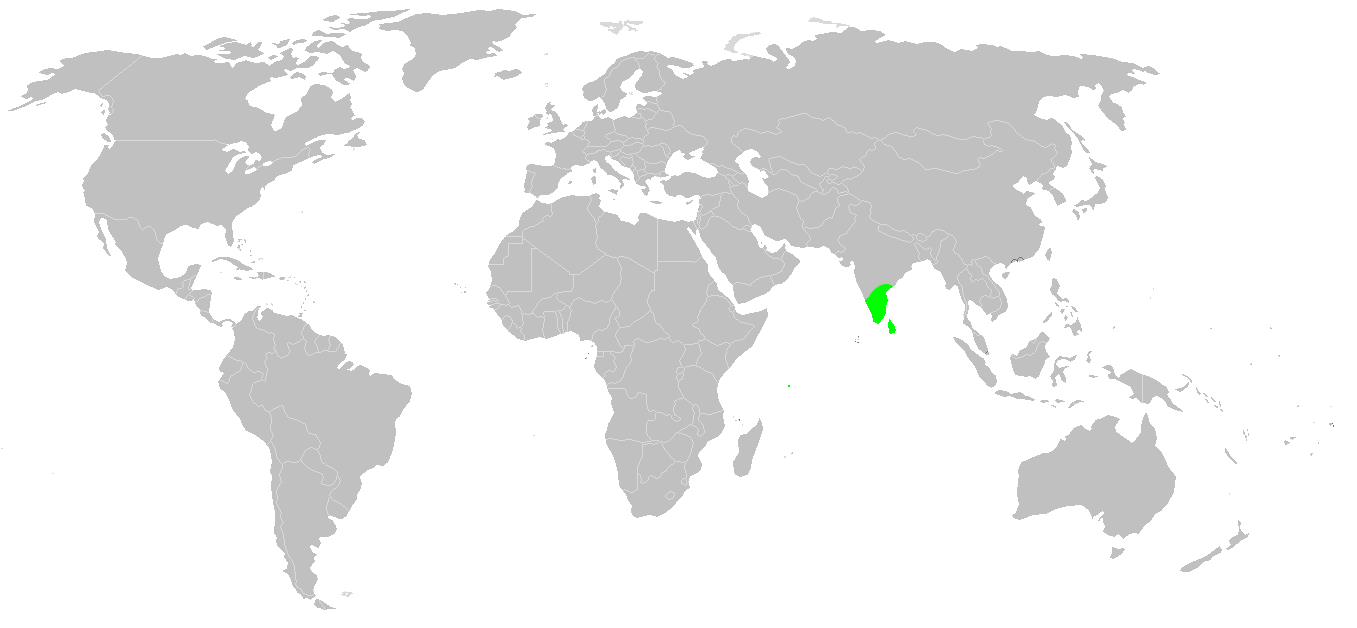

Synonyms
- Sarpedon robustum O. Pickard-Cambridge, 1883; Oecophlaeus cinctipes Pocock, 1892; Sason cinctipes Pocock, 1900; Sason armatoris Pocock, 1900

= Sason robustum =

Species of spider

Sason robustum is a species of barychelid trapdoor spiders. It is only found in southern India, Sri Lanka and the Seychelles.

Males are about 9 mm long, females almost 11 mm.

== Distinguishing features ==
Sason robustum is characterized by absence of teeth on the claws; cuspules present on maxillae and labium; rastellum absent; the apex of the first tibia with a single stout prolateral spine; and the palpal bulb spherical with a tapering embolus.

== Taxonomy ==
Sason robustum was first described by Octavius Pickard-Cambridge in 1883. He placed it in a new genus Sarpedon. However this name had already been used for a beetle, so in 1887, Eugène Simon put forward the replacement genus name, Sason.
