= Ixamatus barina =

Scientific classification
- Kingdom: Animalia
- Phylum: Arthropoda
- Subphylum: Chelicerata
- Class: Arachnida
- Order: Araneae
- Infraorder: Mygalomorphae
- Family: Microstigmatidae
- Genus: Ixamatus
- Species: I. barina

Binomial name
- Ixamatus barina Raven, 1982

Species of spider

Ixamatus barina is a species of mygalomorph spider in the Microstigmatidae family. It is endemic to Australia. It was described in 1982 by Australian arachnologist Robert Raven.

== Distribution and habitat ==
The species occurs in Far North Queensland. The type locality is Baldy Mountain, near Atherton on the Atherton Tableland.

== Behaviour ==
The spiders are terrestrial predators.
