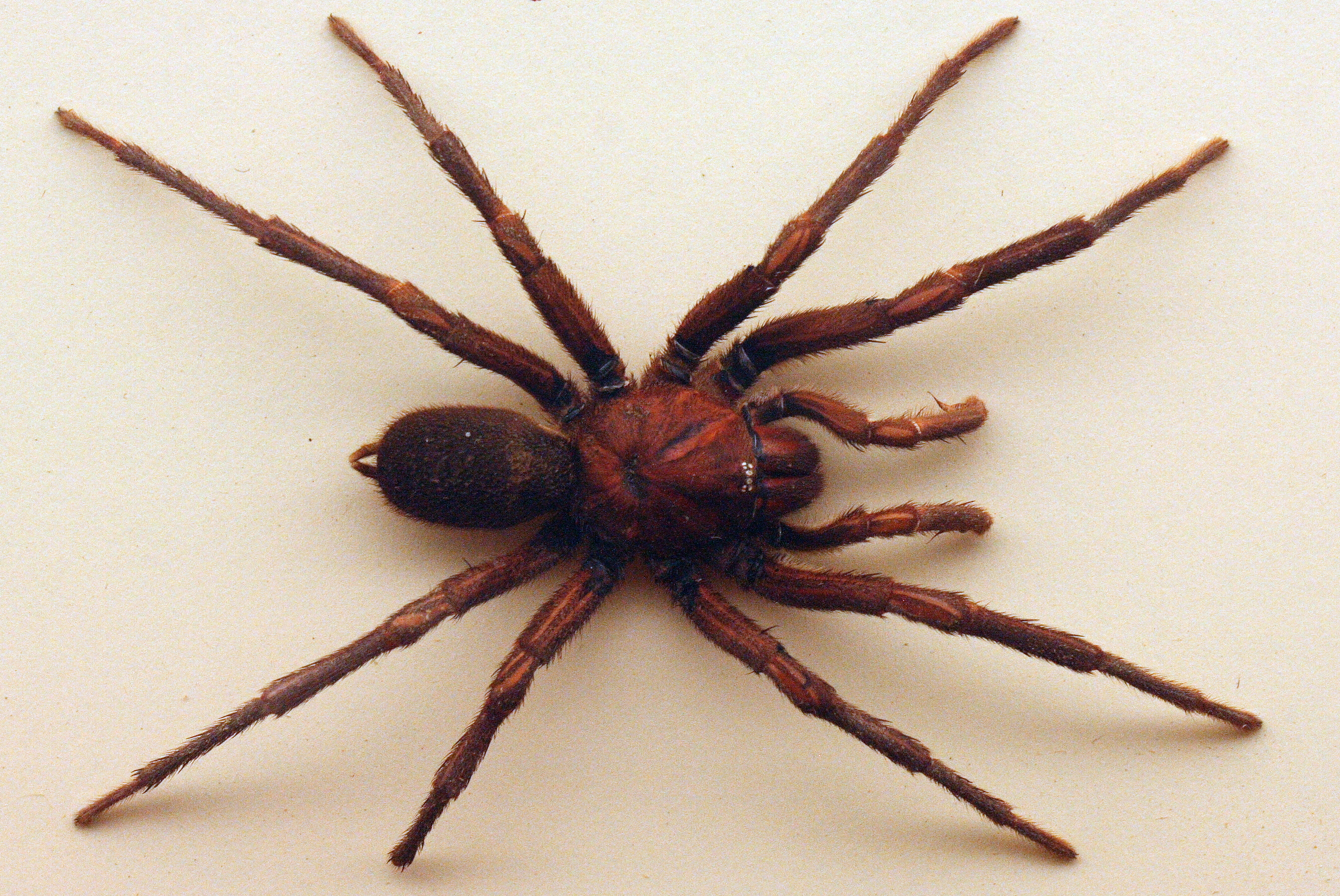

Scientific classification
- Kingdom: Animalia
- Phylum: Arthropoda
- Subphylum: Chelicerata
- Class: Arachnida
- Order: Araneae
- Infraorder: Mygalomorphae
- Family: Microstigmatidae
- Genus: Xamiatus
- Species: X. kia

Binomial name
- Xamiatus kia Raven, 1981

= Xamiatus kia =

Species of spider

Xamiatus kia is a species of mygalomorph spider in the Microstigmatidae family. It is endemic to Australia. It was described in 1981 by Australian arachnologist Robert Raven.

== Distribution and habitat ==
The species occurs in north-eastern New South Wales. The type locality is Newee Creek Road, near Macksville in the Nambucca River valley.

== Behaviour ==
The spiders are terrestrial predators.
