= Microstigmata zuluensis =

Zululand Micro-mygalomorph Spider

Conservation status
- Least Concern (SANBI Red List)

Scientific classification
- Kingdom: Animalia
- Phylum: Arthropoda
- Subphylum: Chelicerata
- Class: Arachnida
- Order: Araneae
- Infraorder: Mygalomorphae
- Family: Microstigmatidae
- Genus: Microstigmata
- Species: M. zuluensis

Binomial name
- Microstigmata zuluensis (Lawrence, 1938)

Synonyms
- Microstigma zuluense Lawrence, 1938

Species of spider

Microstigmata zuluensis is a species of spider in the family Microstigmatidae. It is endemic to South Africa and is commonly known as the Zululand micro-mygalomorph spider.

== Distribution ==
Microstigmata zuluensis is endemic to South Africa, with a widespread distribution occurring in coastal and inland forests of eastern South Africa. The species has been recorded from Port St. Johns in the Eastern Cape and multiple localities in KwaZulu-Natal including Ngome State Forest, Nkandla Forest, Richards Bay, and iSimangaliso Wetland Park (St. Lucia).

== Habitat and ecology ==
The species is a ground-dwelling spider that appears to be restricted to conditions of high humidity and relatively even temperature as found in the understory and litter layer of indigenous forest. Microstigma zuluense was abundant in pitfall traps in the Ngome State Forest and was more active in indigenous forest, being absent or present in low numbers in open grassland and pine plantations.

M. zuluensis is active throughout the year with the lowest numbers recorded in winter (June to August), with males peaking in April. The species has also been sampled during surveys in rehabilitated coastal dune forest and was collected from 100-year-old stands of trees. It inhabits the Forest, Savanna, and Indian Ocean Coastal Belt biomes at altitudes ranging from 3 to 1,102 m above sea level.

== Description ==
Microstigmata zuluensis is known from both sexes.

== Conservation ==
Microstigmata zuluensis is listed as Least Concern by the South African National Biodiversity Institute. The species is widespread and is under-collected, with its range likely extending to neighboring countries including Lesotho and Mozambique. There are no known threats to the species. The species is protected in the Ngome State Forest and iSimangaliso Wetland Park, St. Lucia.

== Taxonomy ==
Microstigmata zuluensis was originally described by Reginald Frederick Lawrence in 1938 as Microstigma zuluense from Nkandla Forest. The species was subsequently revised by Griswold in 1985.
