= Microstigmata geophila =

Scientific classification
- Kingdom: Animalia
- Phylum: Arthropoda
- Subphylum: Chelicerata
- Class: Arachnida
- Order: Araneae
- Infraorder: Mygalomorphae
- Family: Microstigmatidae
- Genus: Microstigmata
- Species: M. geophila

Binomial name
- Microstigmata geophila (Hewitt, 1916)

Synonyms
- Microstigma geophilum Hewitt, 1916

Species of spider

Microstigmata geophila is a species of spider in the family Microstigmatidae. It is endemic to South Africa. It is the type species of the genus Microstigmata.

== Distribution ==
Microstigmata geophila is endemic to South Africa, with a very restricted distribution in the Eastern Cape province around Makhanda (formerly Grahamstown). The species is known from two localities, Grahamstown/Makhanda and Grahamstown Coldspring Farm.

== Habitat and ecology ==
The species is a ground-dwelling spider that appears to be restricted to conditions of high humidity and relatively even temperature as found in the understory and litter layer of indigenous forest and close-canopy bush. It inhabits the Thicket biome at altitudes ranging from 550 to 684 m above sea level.

== Description ==
Microstigmata geophila is known from both sexes.

== Conservation ==
Microstigmata geophila is listed as Data Deficient due to limited knowledge about its current status. The species is known only from collections sampled prior to 1916. The species is threatened by loss of habitat due to farming activities at Coldspring Farm. More sampling is needed to determine the species' range and understand current threats.

== Taxonomy ==
Microstigmata geophila was originally described by John Hewitt in 1916 as Microstigma geophilum from specimens collected around Grahamstown. The species was transferred to the genus Microstigmata by Embrik Strand in 1932 as a generic replacement name. It was subsequently revised by Griswold in 1985.
