= Xamiatus magnificus =

Scientific classification
- Kingdom: Animalia
- Phylum: Arthropoda
- Subphylum: Chelicerata
- Class: Arachnida
- Order: Araneae
- Infraorder: Mygalomorphae
- Family: Microstigmatidae
- Genus: Xamiatus
- Species: X. magnificus

Binomial name
- Xamiatus magnificus Raven, 1981

Species of spider

Xamiatus magnificus is a species of mygalomorph spider in the Microstigmatidae family. It is endemic to Australia. It was described in 1981 by Australian arachnologist Robert Raven.

== Distribution and habitat ==
The species occurs in Far North Queensland in the Tablelands Region. The type locality is Crater Lakes National Park.

== Behaviour ==
The spiders are terrestrial predators.
