= Pseudonemesia parva =

Scientific classification
- Domain: Eukaryota
- Kingdom: Animalia
- Phylum: Arthropoda
- Subphylum: Chelicerata
- Class: Arachnida
- Order: Araneae
- Infraorder: Mygalomorphae
- Family: Microstigmatidae
- Genus: Pseudonemesia
- Species: P. parva

Binomial name
- Pseudonemesia parva Caporiacco, 1955

Species of spider

Pseudonemesia parva is a species of spider in the family Microstigmatidae. It was described by Caporiacco (1955) in Venezuela.
