= Envia garciai =

Scientific classification
- Domain: Eukaryota
- Kingdom: Animalia
- Phylum: Arthropoda
- Subphylum: Chelicerata
- Class: Arachnida
- Order: Araneae
- Infraorder: Mygalomorphae
- Family: Microstigmatidae
- Genus: Envia
- Species: E. garciai

Binomial name
- Envia garciai Ott & Höfer, 2003

Species of spider

Envia garciai is a small (3 mm) pale yellow species of mygalomorph spider from Brazil. It is one of only two described species in the genus Envia.

They live in soil and litter of undisturbed rainforest, where they reach up to 17% of the local spider abundance, with 37 individuals found in one square metre.

According to the authors, the genus name is an arbitrary combination of letters. The species name is in honor of researcher Marcos Garcia.
