= Ixamatus webbae =

Scientific classification
- Kingdom: Animalia
- Phylum: Arthropoda
- Subphylum: Chelicerata
- Class: Arachnida
- Order: Araneae
- Infraorder: Mygalomorphae
- Family: Microstigmatidae
- Genus: Ixamatus
- Species: I. webbae

Binomial name
- Ixamatus webbae Raven, 1982

Species of spider

Ixamatus webbae is a species of mygalomorph spider in the Microstigmatidae family. It is endemic to Australia. It was described in 1982 by Australian arachnologist Robert Raven.

== Description ==
Adult females have a body length of about 25 mm, males about 22 mm.

== Distribution and habitat ==
The species occurs in the border ranges of south-east Queensland in rainforest habitats. The type locality is Lamington National Park.

== Behaviour ==
The spiders are terrestrial predators. They occupy burrows; the females are sedentary, while the males wander during the breeding season.
