= Sason sechellanum =

Scientific classification
- Kingdom: Animalia
- Phylum: Arthropoda
- Subphylum: Chelicerata
- Class: Arachnida
- Order: Araneae
- Infraorder: Mygalomorphae
- Family: Barychelidae
- Genus: Sason
- Species: S. sechellanum

Binomial name
- Sason sechellanum Simon, 1898

Species of spider

Sason sechellanum is a species of spider in the family Barychelidae, found in the Seychelles.
