= Ixamatus caldera =

Scientific classification
- Kingdom: Animalia
- Phylum: Arthropoda
- Subphylum: Chelicerata
- Class: Arachnida
- Order: Araneae
- Infraorder: Mygalomorphae
- Family: Microstigmatidae
- Genus: Ixamatus
- Species: I. caldera

Binomial name
- Ixamatus caldera Raven, 1982

Species of spider

Ixamatus caldera, also known as the tessellated wishbone spider or volcanic ground spider, is a species of mygalomorph spider in the Microstigmatidae family. It is endemic to Australia. It was described in 1982 by Australian arachnologist Robert Raven.

== Distribution and habitat ==
The species occurs in north-eastern New South Wales in closed forest habitats. The type locality is Bar Mountain, near Kyogle in the Tweed Range.

== Behaviour ==
The spiders are terrestrial predators.
