= Ixamatus varius =

Scientific classification
- Kingdom: Animalia
- Phylum: Arthropoda
- Subphylum: Chelicerata
- Class: Arachnida
- Order: Araneae
- Infraorder: Mygalomorphae
- Family: Microstigmatidae
- Genus: Ixamatus
- Species: I. varius

Binomial name
- Ixamatus varius (L.Koch, 1873)

Synonyms
- Ixalus varius L.Koch, 1873

Species of spider

Ixamatus varius is a species of mygalomorph spider in the Microstigmatidae family. It is endemic to Australia. It was described in 1873 by German arachnologist Ludwig Carl Christian Koch.

== Distribution and habitat ==
The species occurs in North Queensland in closed forest habitats. The type locality is Eungella National Park, some 80 km west of Mackay.

== Behaviour ==
The spiders are fossorial, terrestrial predators.
