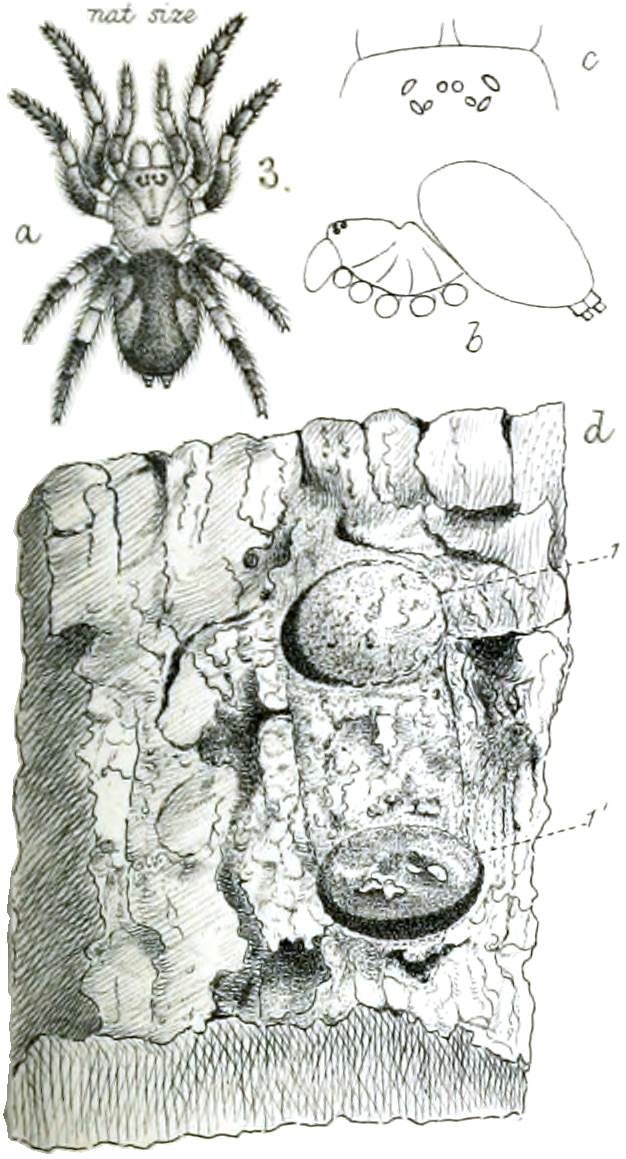
- P. abrahami

Scientific classification
- Kingdom: Animalia
- Phylum: Arthropoda
- Subphylum: Chelicerata
- Class: Arachnida
- Order: Araneae
- Infraorder: Mygalomorphae
- Family: Migidae
- Genus: Poecilomigas; Simon

Species

= Poecilomigas =

Genus of spiders

Poecilomigas is an African genus of spiders in the family Migidae, with three species. It was first described in 1903 by Eugène Simon.

== Species ==
As of October 2025, this genus includes three species:

- Poecilomigas abrahami (O. Pickard-Cambridge, 1889) – South Africa (type species)
- Poecilomigas basilleupi Benoit, 1962 – Tanzania
- Poecilomigas elegans Griswold, 1987 – South Africa
