= Microstigmata ukhahlamba =

Cathedral Peak Micro-mygalomorph Spider

Conservation status
- Least Concern (SANBI Red List)

Scientific classification
- Kingdom: Animalia
- Phylum: Arthropoda
- Subphylum: Chelicerata
- Class: Arachnida
- Order: Araneae
- Infraorder: Mygalomorphae
- Family: Microstigmatidae
- Genus: Microstigmata
- Species: M. ukhahlamba

Binomial name
- Microstigmata ukhahlamba Griswold, 1985

Species of spider

Microstigmata ukhahlamba is a species of spider in the family Microstigmatidae. It is endemic to South Africa and is commonly known as the Cathedral Peak micro-mygalomorph spider.

== Distribution ==
Microstigmata ukhahlamba is endemic to South Africa, with its distribution recorded from the Drakensberg mountain range extending from KwaZulu-Natal to the Eastern Cape. The species has been recorded from Cathedral Peak Forest Station, Cathedral Peak Ndumeni Forest, Monks Cowl, Royal Natal National Park in KwaZulu-Natal, and Prentjiesberg in the Eastern Cape.

== Habitat and ecology ==
The species is a ground-dwelling spider that appears to be restricted to conditions of high humidity and relatively even temperature as found in the understory and litter layer of indigenous forest and close-canopy bush. The species has been sampled from litter and rotted bark in forest, particularly in the spray zone of water. It inhabits the Savanna and Forest biomes at altitudes ranging from 1,135 to 1,782 m above sea level.

== Description ==
Microstigmata ukhahlamba is known from both sexes.

== Conservation ==
Microstigmata ukhahlamba is listed as Least Concern by the South African National Biodiversity Institute. Despite being a restricted endemic, this species is mostly found in protected areas and has no documented threats. The species is protected in the Cathedral Peak Forest Station and Royal Natal National Park.

== Taxonomy ==
Microstigmata ukhahlamba was described by Griswold in 1985 from Ndumeni Forest at Cathedral Peak.
