= Pseudonemesia kochalkai =

Scientific classification
- Domain: Eukaryota
- Kingdom: Animalia
- Phylum: Arthropoda
- Subphylum: Chelicerata
- Class: Arachnida
- Order: Araneae
- Infraorder: Mygalomorphae
- Family: Microstigmatidae
- Genus: Pseudonemesia
- Species: P. kochalkai

Binomial name
- Pseudonemesia kochalkai Raven & Platnick, 1981

Species of spider

Pseudonemesia kochalkai is a species of spider in the family Microstigmatidae. It was first described by Robert J. Raven & Norman I. Platnick in 1981. It is found in Colombia.
