= Xamiatus ilara =

Scientific classification
- Kingdom: Animalia
- Phylum: Arthropoda
- Subphylum: Chelicerata
- Class: Arachnida
- Order: Araneae
- Infraorder: Mygalomorphae
- Family: Microstigmatidae
- Genus: Xamiatus
- Species: X. ilara

Binomial name
- Xamiatus ilara Raven, 1982

Species of spider

Xamiatus ilara is a species of mygalomorph spider in the Microstigmatidae family. It is endemic to Australia. It was described in 1982 by Australian arachnologist Robert Raven.

== Description ==
These large spiders have a carapace length of about 14 mm and a total length of up to 90 mm. Colouration of the carapace, chelicerae and legs is mainly reddish-brown, with a grey-black abdomen.

== Distribution and habitat ==
The species occurs in Central Queensland. The type, and only known, locality is open forest dominated by Casuarina, on the Blackdown Tableland west of Rockhampton.

== Behaviour ==
The spiders are terrestrial predators. They construct slanting burrows about 40 cm long in sandy or compact red soils.
