= Sason pectinatum =

Scientific classification
- Domain: Eukaryota
- Kingdom: Animalia
- Phylum: Arthropoda
- Subphylum: Chelicerata
- Class: Arachnida
- Order: Araneae
- Infraorder: Mygalomorphae
- Family: Barychelidae
- Genus: Sason
- Species: S. pectinatum

Binomial name
- Sason pectinatum Kulczyński, 1908

Species of spider

Sason pectinatum is a species of spider in the family Barychelidae, found in New Guinea.
