= Ixamatus candidus =

Scientific classification
- Kingdom: Animalia
- Phylum: Arthropoda
- Subphylum: Chelicerata
- Class: Arachnida
- Order: Araneae
- Infraorder: Mygalomorphae
- Family: Microstigmatidae
- Genus: Ixamatus
- Species: I. candidus

Binomial name
- Ixamatus candidus Raven, 1982

Species of spider

Ixamatus candidus is a species of mygalomorph spider in the Microstigmatidae family. It is endemic to Australia. It was described in 1982 by Australian arachnologist Robert Raven.

== Distribution and habitat ==
The species occurs in north-eastern New South Wales in closed forest habitats. The type locality is Poverty Point, Tenterfield, in the Northern Tablelands region.

== Behaviour ==
The spiders are terrestrial predators.
