= Microstigmata lawrencei =

Scientific classification
- Kingdom: Animalia
- Phylum: Arthropoda
- Subphylum: Chelicerata
- Class: Arachnida
- Order: Araneae
- Infraorder: Mygalomorphae
- Family: Microstigmatidae
- Genus: Microstigmata
- Species: M. lawrencei

Binomial name
- Microstigmata lawrencei Griswold, 1985

Species of spider

Microstigmata lawrencei is a species of spider in the family Microstigmatidae. It is endemic to South Africa.

== Etymology ==
The species is named in honor of Reginald Frederick Lawrence, a South African arachnologist who made significant contributions to the study of South African spiders.

== Distribution ==
Microstigmata lawrencei is endemic to South Africa, with a limited distribution in the Eastern Cape and KwaZulu-Natal provinces. The species is known from two collection localities.

== Habitat and ecology ==
The species is a ground-dwelling spider that appears to be restricted to conditions of high humidity and relatively even temperature as found in the understory and litter layer of indigenous forest and close-canopy bush. It has been sampled from the Forest biome at altitudes ranging from 776 to 1,573 m above sea level.

== Description ==
Microstigmata lawrencei is known only from the female.

== Conservation ==
Microstigmata lawrencei is listed as Data Deficient for taxonomic reasons. The species is presently known only from two collection localities and the male remains unknown. The species is threatened by loss of habitat due to crop farming between Franklin and Riverside. More sampling is needed to collect the male and to determine the species' range.

== Taxonomy ==
Microstigmata lawrencei was described by Griswold in 1985 from specimens collected in the Kambi Forest in the Eastern Cape.
