= Microstigmata amatola =

Scientific classification
- Kingdom: Animalia
- Phylum: Arthropoda
- Subphylum: Chelicerata
- Class: Arachnida
- Order: Araneae
- Infraorder: Mygalomorphae
- Family: Microstigmatidae
- Genus: Microstigmata
- Species: M. amatola

Binomial name
- Microstigmata amatola Griswold, 1985

Species of spider

Microstigmata amatola is a species of spider in the family Microstigmatidae. It is endemic to South Africa.

== Etymology ==
The species is named after the Amatola Mountains in the Eastern Cape, where it was first discovered.

== Distribution ==
Microstigmata amatola is endemic to South Africa, with a very restricted distribution in the Eastern Cape province. The species is known from only two collection localities approximately 35 km apart: Hogsback in the Amatola Mountains and Stutterheim Kologha Forest.

== Habitat and ecology ==
The species is a ground-dwelling wandering spider that appears to be restricted to conditions of high humidity and relatively even temperature as found in the understory and litter layer of indigenous forest and close-canopy bush. It has been sampled from the Forest biome at altitudes ranging from 1,052 to 1,372 m above sea level.

== Description ==
While not much is known about this species specifically, it is known that they share common traits with the other species of their genus Microstigmata. These characteristics being their status as small ground-dwelling spiders, often making their homes in the scattered leaf litter of the forests of South Africa.

== Conservation ==
Microstigmata amatola is listed as Rare by the South African National Biodiversity Institute due to its small restricted distribution range of less than 100 km^{2}. There are no known threats to the species currently.

== Taxonomy ==
Microstigmata amatola was described by Charles Griswold in 1985 from specimens collected at Hogsback in the Amatola Mountains. The species is known from both sexes and belongs to the genus Microstigmata, which is the only representative of the family Microstigmatidae in South Africa.
