= Microstigmata longipes =

Natal Micro-mygalomorph Spider

Conservation status
- Least Concern (SANBI Red List)

Scientific classification
- Kingdom: Animalia
- Phylum: Arthropoda
- Subphylum: Chelicerata
- Class: Arachnida
- Order: Araneae
- Infraorder: Mygalomorphae
- Family: Microstigmatidae
- Genus: Microstigmata
- Species: M. longipes

Binomial name
- Microstigmata longipes (Lawrence, 1938)

Synonyms
- Microstigma longipes Lawrence, 1938

Species of spider

Microstigmata longipes is a species of spider in the family Microstigmatidae. It is endemic to South Africa and is commonly known as the Natal micro-mygalomorph spider.

== Distribution ==
Microstigmata longipes is endemic to South Africa, with a widespread distribution throughout KwaZulu-Natal and extending into the Eastern Cape. The species has been recorded from numerous localities.

== Habitat and ecology ==
The species is a ground-dwelling spider that appears to be restricted to conditions of high humidity and relatively even temperature as found in the understory and litter layer of indigenous forest and close-canopy bush. Microstigmata longipes has also been sampled by splitting open damp, rotting logs. From surveys at the Ngome State Forest near Vryheid, M. longipes was more active in indigenous forest compared to pine plantations. The species is active throughout the year with the lowest numbers recorded in winter (June to August), with males peaking in November. It has been sampled from the Forest, Savanna, and Indian Ocean Coastal Belt biomes at altitudes ranging from 5 to 2,785 m above sea level.

== Description ==
Microstigmata longipes is known from both sexes.

== Conservation ==
Microstigmata longipes is listed as Least Concern by the South African National Biodiversity Institute. Although habitat has been lost to afforestation, crop cultivation and deforestation, this species is relatively resilient and can occur in marginal and transformed habitats. There are no known threats to the species.

== Taxonomy ==
Microstigmata longipes was originally described by Reginald Frederick Lawrence in 1938 as Microstigma longipes from the Umkomaas Valley in KwaZulu-Natal. The species was subsequently revised by Griswold in 1985.
