= Ixamatus broomi =

Scientific classification
- Kingdom: Animalia
- Phylum: Arthropoda
- Subphylum: Chelicerata
- Class: Arachnida
- Order: Araneae
- Infraorder: Mygalomorphae
- Family: Microstigmatidae
- Genus: Ixamatus
- Species: I. broomi

Binomial name
- Ixamatus broomi Hogg, 1901

Species of spider

Ixamatus broomi is a species of mygalomorph spider in the Microstigmatidae family. It is endemic to Australia. It was described in 1901 by British arachnologist Henry Roughton Hogg.

== Distribution and habitat ==
The species occurs in south-eastern Queensland and north-eastern New South Wales, in tall open and closed forest habitats, including the border ranges and the Lamington Plateau. The type locality is Hillgrove in the Northern Tablelands.

== Behaviour ==
The spiders are terrestrial predators. They construct shallow burrows in humus and tubular silk shelters in logs.
