= Ixamatus =

Scientific classification
- Kingdom: Animalia
- Phylum: Arthropoda
- Subphylum: Chelicerata
- Class: Arachnida
- Order: Araneae
- Infraorder: Mygalomorphae
- Family: Microstigmatidae
- Genus: Ixamatus; Simon, 1887

Type species
- Ixamatus varius

Species
- 10, see text

Genus of spiders

Ixamatus is a genus of mygalomorph spiders in the family Microstigmatidae. It is endemic to Australia and was first described in 1887 by French arachnologist Eugène Simon.

== Species ==
As of 2017, the genus comprised ten species from New South Wales or Queensland:

- Ixamatus barina Raven, 1982
- Ixamatus broomi Hogg, 1901
- Ixamatus caldera Raven, 1982
- Ixamatus candidus Raven, 1982
- Ixamatus fischeri Raven, 1982
- Ixamatus lornensis Raven, 1985
- Ixamatus musgravei Raven, 1982
- Ixamatus rozefeldsi Raven, 1985
- Ixamatus varius (L. Koch, 1873)
- Ixamatus webbae Raven, 1982
