= Envia =

Scientific classification
- Domain: Eukaryota
- Kingdom: Animalia
- Phylum: Arthropoda
- Subphylum: Chelicerata
- Class: Arachnida
- Order: Araneae
- Infraorder: Mygalomorphae
- Family: Microstigmatidae
- Genus: Envia; Ott & Höfer, 2003

Genus of spiders

Envia is a spider genus in the family Microstigmatidae, found only in Brazil.

== Species ==
As of February 2016, the World Spider Catalog accepted the following species:

- Envia garciai Ott & Höfer, 2003 (type species) – Brazil
- Envia moleque Miglio & Bonaldo, 2011 – Brazil
