= Ministigmata =

Scientific classification
- Kingdom: Animalia
- Phylum: Arthropoda
- Subphylum: Chelicerata
- Class: Arachnida
- Order: Araneae
- Infraorder: Mygalomorphae
- Family: Microstigmatidae
- Genus: Ministigmata
- Species: M. minuta

Binomial name
- Ministigmata minuta Raven & Platnick, 1981

Genus of spiders

Ministigmata is a genus of spiders in the family Microstigmatidae. It was first described in 1981 by Raven & Platnick. As of 2017, it contains only one species, Ministigmata minuta, from Brazil.
