= Microstigmata =

Scientific classification
- Kingdom: Animalia
- Phylum: Arthropoda
- Subphylum: Chelicerata
- Class: Arachnida
- Order: Araneae
- Infraorder: Mygalomorphae
- Family: Microstigmatidae
- Genus: Microstigmata; Strand, 1932

Genus of spiders

Microstigmata is a genus of spiders in the family Microstigmatidae. All species are endemic to South Africa.

== Species ==
As of September 2025, the World Spider Catalog accepted the following species:

- Microstigmata amatola Griswold, 1985
- Microstigmata geophila (Hewitt, 1916) (type species)
- Microstigmata lawrencei Griswold, 1985
- Microstigmata longipes (Lawrence, 1938)
- Microstigmata ukhahlamba Griswold, 1985
- Microstigmata zuluensis (Lawrence, 1938)
