= Tonton (spider) =

Scientific classification
- Kingdom: Animalia
- Phylum: Arthropoda
- Subphylum: Chelicerata
- Class: Arachnida
- Order: Araneae
- Infraorder: Mygalomorphae
- Family: Microstigmatidae
- Genus: Tonton; Passanha, Cizauskas & Brescovit, 2019

Type species
- T. itabirito Passanha, Cizauskas & Brescovit, 2019

Species
- 7, see text

Genus of spiders

Tonton is a genus of South American mygalomorph spiders in the family Microstigmatidae. It was first described by V. Passanha, I. Cizauskas and Antônio Domingos Brescovit in 2019, and it has only been found in Brazil.

== Species ==
As of October 2025, this genus includes seven species:

- Tonton emboaba (Pedroso, Baptista & Bertani, 2015) – Brazil
- Tonton ipiau Passanha, Cizauskas & Brescovit, 2019 – Brazil
- Tonton itabirito Passanha, Cizauskas & Brescovit, 2019 – Brazil (type species)
- Tonton matodentro Passanha, Cizauskas & Brescovit, 2019 – Brazil
- Tonton queca Passanha, Cizauskas & Brescovit, 2019 – Brazil
- Tonton quiteria Passanha, Cizauskas & Brescovit, 2019 – Brazil
- Tonton sapalo Passanha, Cizauskas & Brescovit, 2019 – Brazil

== See also ==
- Masteria
