= Angka hexops =

Scientific classification
- Domain: Eukaryota
- Kingdom: Animalia
- Phylum: Arthropoda
- Subphylum: Chelicerata
- Class: Arachnida
- Order: Araneae
- Infraorder: Mygalomorphae
- Family: Microstigmatidae
- Genus: Angka; Raven & Schwendinger, 1995
- Species: A. hexops

Binomial name
- Angka hexops Raven & Schwendinger, 1995

Genus of spiders

Angka hexops is a species of Southeast Asian spiders in the family Microstigmatidae. It is the only species in the monotypic genus Angka. It was first described by Robert Raven & Peter J. Schwendinger in 1995, and has only been found in Thailand.
