= Spelocteniza =

Scientific classification
- Domain: Eukaryota
- Kingdom: Animalia
- Phylum: Arthropoda
- Subphylum: Chelicerata
- Class: Arachnida
- Order: Araneae
- Infraorder: Mygalomorphae
- Family: Microstigmatidae
- Genus: Spelocteniza
- Species: S. ashmolei

Binomial name
- Spelocteniza ashmolei Gertsch, 1982

Genus of spiders

Spelocteniza is a genus of spiders in the family Microstigmatidae. It was first described in 1982 by Gertsch. As of 2017, it contains only one species, Spelocteniza ashmolei, which is found in Ecuador.
