= Pseudonemesia =

Scientific classification
- Kingdom: Animalia
- Phylum: Arthropoda
- Subphylum: Chelicerata
- Class: Arachnida
- Order: Araneae
- Infraorder: Mygalomorphae
- Family: Microstigmatidae
- Genus: Pseudonemesia; Caporiacco, 1955

Genus of spiders

Pseudonemesia is a genus of spiders in the family Microstigmatidae, found in Colombia and Venezuela.

== Species ==
As of September 2025, the World Spider Catalog accepted the following species:

- Pseudonemesia kochalkai Raven & Platnick, 1981 – Colombia
- Pseudonemesia parva Caporiacco, 1955 (type species) – Venezuela
- Pseudonemesia scutata Dupérré & Tapia, 2025 – Ecuador
- Pseudonemesia tabiskey Indicatti & Villareal M., 2016 – Venezuela
