= Pastaza (spider) =

Scientific classification
- Kingdom: Animalia
- Phylum: Arthropoda
- Subphylum: Chelicerata
- Class: Arachnida
- Order: Araneae
- Infraorder: Mygalomorphae
- Family: Microstigmatidae
- Genus: Pastaza; Dupérré & Tapia, 2025

Type species
- P. aureliae Dupérré & Tapia, 2025

Species
- 3, see text

Genus of spiders

Pastaza is a genus of spiders in the family Microstigmatidae.

== Distribution ==
The genus is endemic to Ecuador.

== Etymology ==
This genus is named after Pastaza Province in Ecuador.

== Species ==
As of January 2026, this genus includes three species:

- Pastaza aureliae Dupérré & Tapia, 2025 – Ecuador
- Pastaza roberti Dupérré & Tapia, 2025 – Ecuador
- Pastaza vegai Dupérré & Tapia, 2025 – Ecuador
