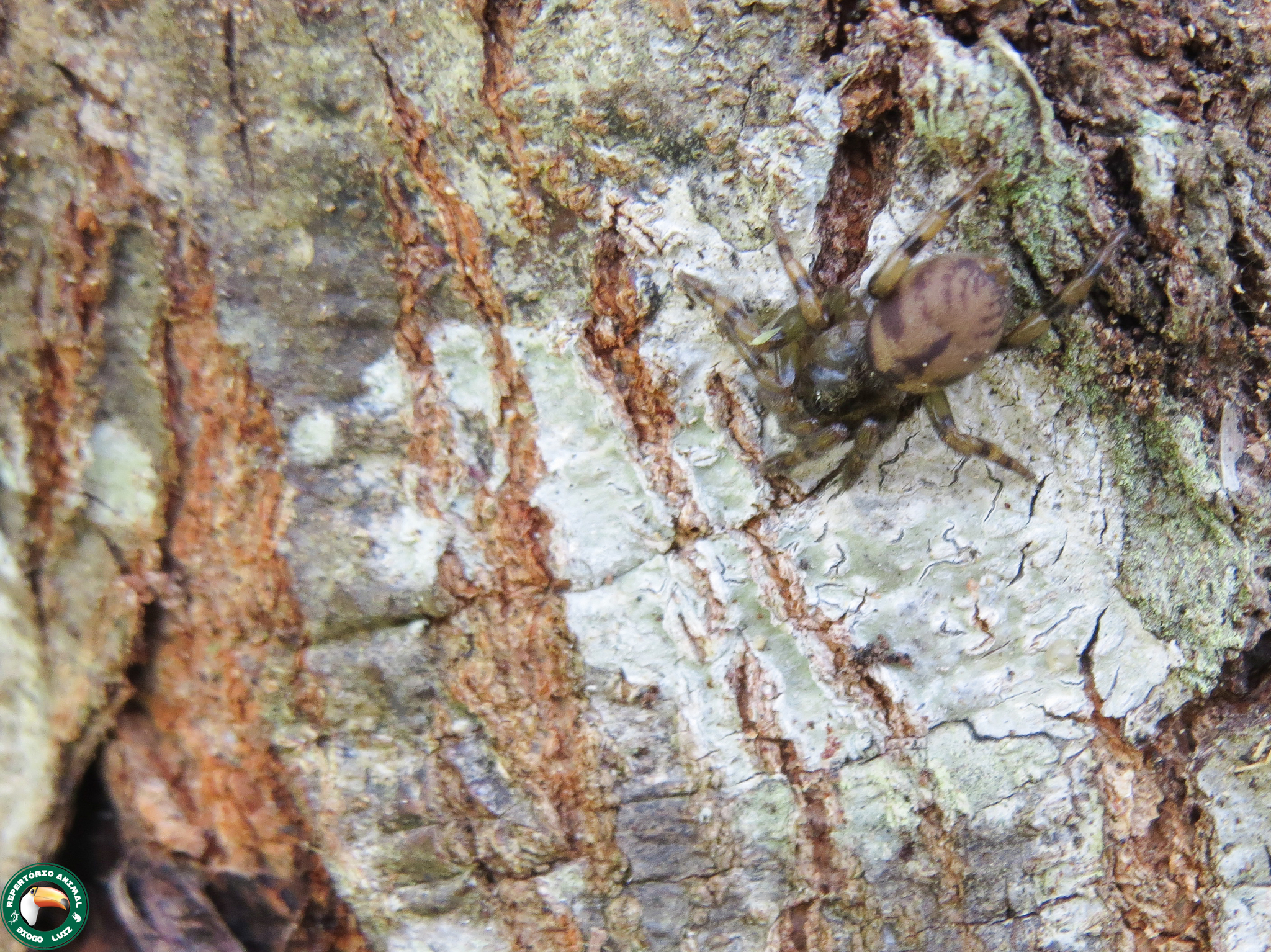
- P. gerecormophilum

Scientific classification
- Kingdom: Animalia
- Phylum: Arthropoda
- Subphylum: Chelicerata
- Class: Arachnida
- Order: Araneae
- Infraorder: Mygalomorphae
- Family: Barychelidae
- Genus: Paracenobiopelma; Feio, 1952
- Species: P. gerecormophilum

Binomial name
- Paracenobiopelma gerecormophilum Feio, 1952

= Paracenobiopelma =

Genus of spiders

Paracenobiopelma is a formerly monotypic genus of South American brushed trapdoor spiders.

Its formerly single species, Paracenobiopelma gerecormophilum, was first described in 1952, and has only been found in Brazil. In 2025, P. vesca was described from Ecuador.

Their closest relatives are found in the genus Sason, which occur in south Asia.

== Name ==
The genus name is combined from the Ancient Greek "para" (παρά), meaning "near to", and the genus name "Cenobiopelma", now renamed "Oligoxystre". "Cenobiopelma" is derived from the Ancient Greek roots ceno "evacuation", bio "life", and pelma "sole of the foot".

The species name is derived from the roots ger "to carry", cormo "tree trunk" and philum "to like".

== Species ==
As of October 2025, this genus now includes two species:

- Paracenobiopelma gerecormophilum Feio, 1952 – Brazil (type species)
- Paracenobiopelma vesca Dupérré & Tapia, 2025 – Ecuador
