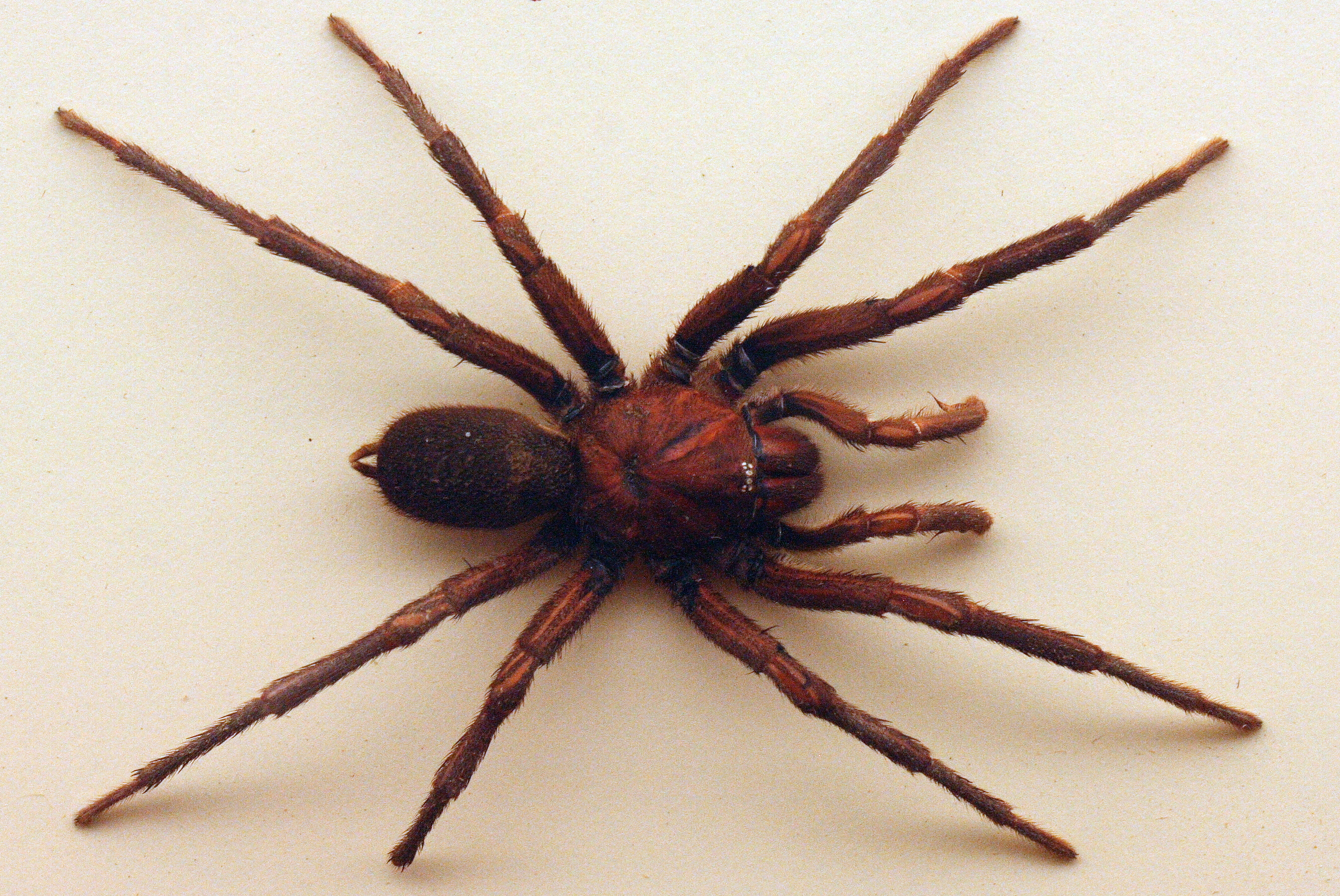
- Xamiatus kia

Scientific classification
- Domain: Eukaryota
- Kingdom: Animalia
- Phylum: Arthropoda
- Subphylum: Chelicerata
- Class: Arachnida
- Order: Araneae
- Infraorder: Mygalomorphae
- Family: Microstigmatidae
- Genus: Xamiatus; Raven

Species
- See text.

= Xamiatus =

Genus of spiders

Xamiatus is a genus of spiders in the family Microstigmatidae. It is endemic to Australia and was first described in 1981 by Robert Raven.

== Species ==
As of 2017, the genus contained five species from Queensland or New South Wales:

- Xamiatus bulburin Raven, 1981
- Xamiatus ilara Raven, 1982
- Xamiatus kia Raven, 1981
- Xamiatus magnificus Raven, 1981
- Xamiatus rubrifrons Raven, 1981
