= Micromygale =

Scientific classification
- Kingdom: Animalia
- Phylum: Arthropoda
- Subphylum: Chelicerata
- Class: Arachnida
- Order: Araneae
- Infraorder: Mygalomorphae
- Family: Microstigmatidae
- Genus: Micromygale; Platnick & Forster, 1982
- Species: M. diblemma

Binomial name
- Micromygale diblemma Platnick & Forster, 1982

Genus of spiders

Micromygale is a genus of spiders in the family Microstigmatidae containing the sole species Micromygale diblemma. The species was described in 1982 by Platnick and Forster and is found in Panama.
