= Poecilomigas abrahami =

Abraham's Banded-Legged Trapdoor Spider

Conservation status
- Least Concern (SANBI Red List)

Scientific classification
- Kingdom: Animalia
- Phylum: Arthropoda
- Subphylum: Chelicerata
- Class: Arachnida
- Order: Araneae
- Infraorder: Mygalomorphae
- Family: Migidae
- Genus: Poecilomigas
- Species: P. abrahami

Binomial name
- Poecilomigas abrahami (O. Pickard-Cambridge, 1889)

Synonyms
- Moggridgea tidmarshi Lenz, 1889; Moggridgea stauntoni Pocock, 1902; Poecilomigas pulchripes Simon, 1903

Species of spider

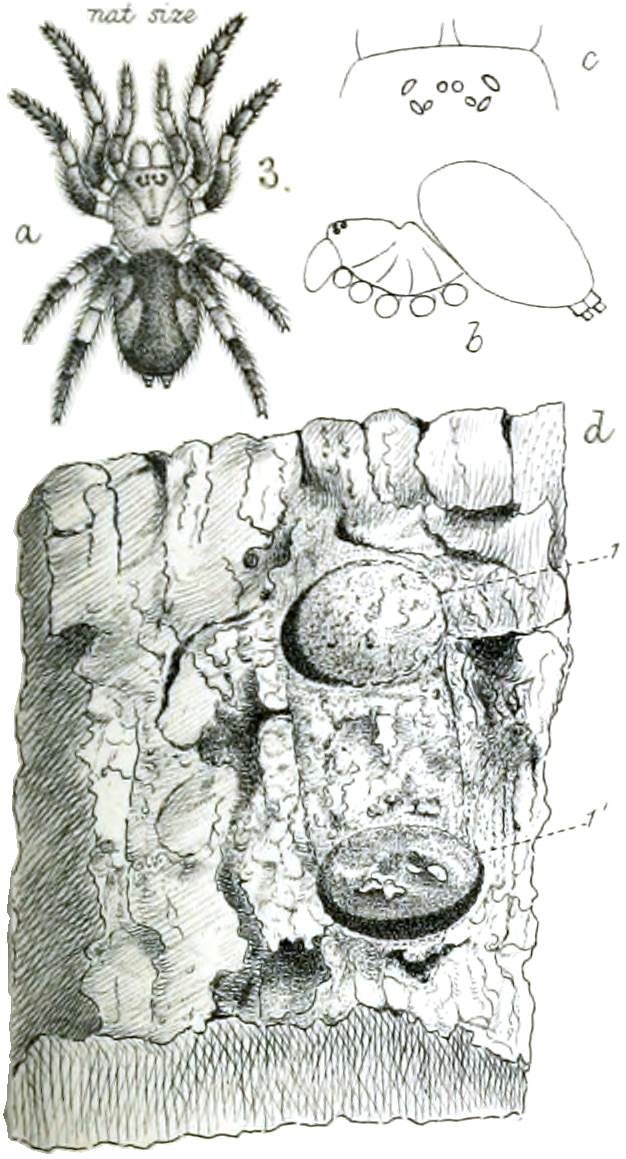

Poecilomigas abrahami is a species of spider in the family Migidae. It is endemic to South Africa and is commonly known as Abraham's banded-legged trapdoor spider. It is the type species of the genus Poecilomigas.

== Distribution ==
Poecilomigas abrahami has a wide distribution across three South African provinces. It occurs in the Eastern Cape (Alexandria Coastal Forest, East London, Grahamstown, King William's Town, Port St. Johns, Baviaanskloof Nature Reserve), KwaZulu-Natal (Durban, Eshowe, Hluhluwe Nature Reserve, Kloof, Pietermaritzburg, Port Edward, Sodwana Bay, Umgeni Valley Nature Reserve), and Northern Cape (Fraserburg, Koingnaas).

== Habitat ==
The species inhabits multiple biomes including Forest, Grassland, Nama Karoo, Savanna, Succulent Karoo, Indian Ocean Coastal Belt, and Thicket biomes at altitudes ranging from 10 to 1,679 m above sea level.

== Description ==
Poecilomigas abrahami is known from both sexes.

== Ecology ==
Poecilomigas abrahami are exclusively arboreal trapdoor spiders that live in sac-like nests made in large shady trees. The retreat is constructed in a depression or crevice on the trunk of various indigenous trees with soft, irregular bark. The nests are usually open at each end and furnished with oval wafer-type lids, with the bottom opening used for escape.

== Conservation ==
Poecilomigas abrahami is listed as Least Concern by the South African National Biodiversity Institute due to its wide geographical range. The species is protected in several forest reserves as well as the Baviaanskloof Nature Reserve, Hluhluwe Nature Reserve, and Umgeni Valley Nature Reserve.

== Taxonomy ==
The species was originally described by O. Pickard-Cambridge in 1889 as Moggridgea abrahami from Grahamstown. Charles E. Griswold's 1987 revision synonymized several species including Poecilomigas pulchripes and P. stauntoni with this species. It serves as the type species for the genus Poecilomigas.
