= Kiama lachrymoides =

Scientific classification
- Domain: Eukaryota
- Kingdom: Animalia
- Phylum: Arthropoda
- Subphylum: Chelicerata
- Class: Arachnida
- Order: Araneae
- Infraorder: Mygalomorphae
- Family: Microstigmatidae
- Genus: Kiama; Main & Mascord, 1969
- Species: K. lachrymoides

Binomial name
- Kiama lachrymoides Main & Mascord, 1969

Species of spider

Kiama lachrymoides is a species of spiders in the family Microstigmatidae. It was first described in 1969 by Main and Mascord. As of 2017, it is the sole species in the genus Kiama. It is found in New South Wales.
