= Peter J. Schwendinger =

Austrian arachnologist

Peter J. Schwendinger (born 27 April 1959 in Dornbirn, Austria) is an Austrian arachnologist.

He graduated from Innsbruck University in 1985, and in 1990 with a PhD, where he studied with Konrad Thaler. He was a lecturer at Innsbruck University, from 1989 to 1999. He taught at Chiang Mai University from 1996 to 1997. He is a curator at the Natural History Museum of Geneva. He is an editor of the journal Zootaxa.

== Works ==
- Peter J. Schwendinger and Jochen Martens, Schwendinger, Peter J.; Martens, Jochen (2002). "Penis Morphology in Oncopodidae (Opiliones, Laniatores): Evolutionary Trends and Relationships". Journal of Arachnology. 30 (2): 425–434. doi:10.1636/0161-8202(2002)030[0425:PMIOOL]2.0.CO;2. JSTOR 3706287. S2CID 52215721., Proceedings of the 15th International Congress of Arachnology
