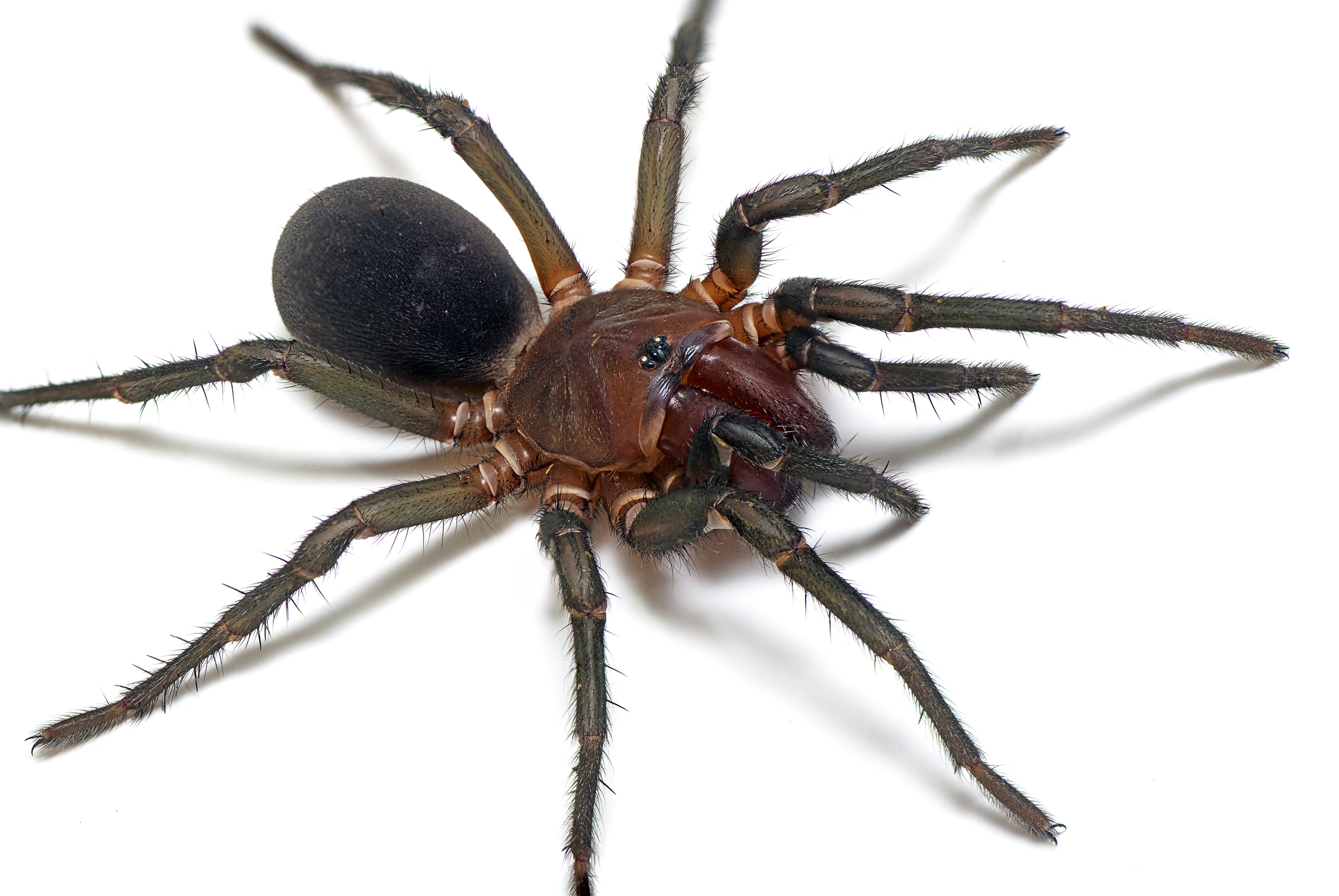
- Xamiatus rubrifrons in Australia
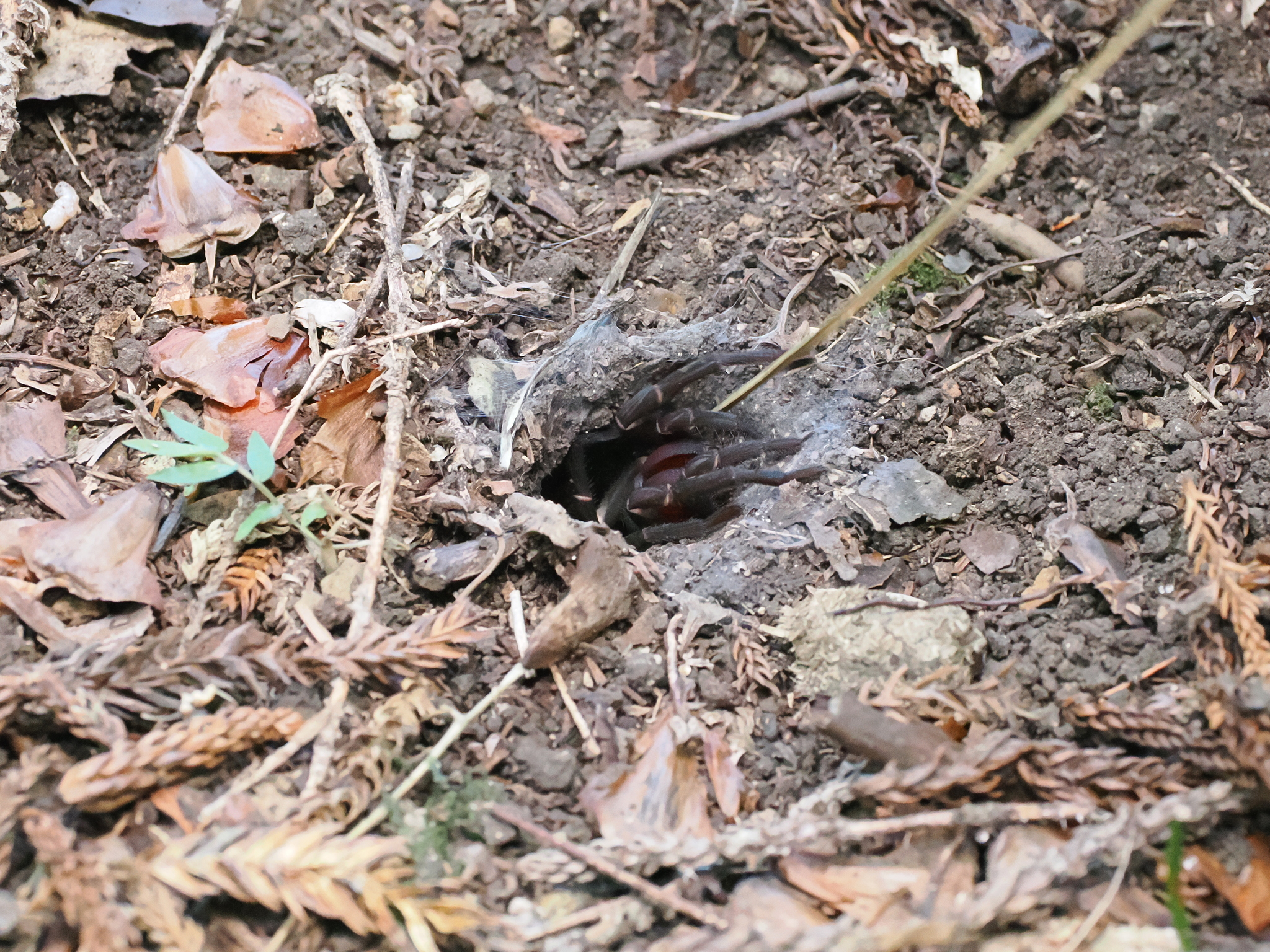
- X. rubrifrons in burrow

Scientific classification
- Kingdom: Animalia
- Phylum: Arthropoda
- Subphylum: Chelicerata
- Class: Arachnida
- Order: Araneae
- Infraorder: Mygalomorphae
- Clade: Avicularioidea
- Family: Microstigmatidae; Roewer, 1942

Diversity
- 12 genera, 44 species
- blue: reported countries (WSC)

= Microstigmatidae =

Microstigmatidae Temporal range: Neogene–present

Family of spiders

Microstigmatidae is a small family of spiders with about 38 described species in eleven genera. They are small ground-dwelling and free-living spiders that make little use of silk.

The family was removed from the family Dipluridae in 1981. The subfamily Pseudonemesiinae from the family Ctenizidae was also transferred into the Microstigmatidae.

== Genera ==
As of October 2026, this family includes twelve genera and 44 species:

- Angka Raven & Schwendinger, 1995 – Thailand
- Envia Ott & Höfer, 2004 – Brazil
- Ixamatus Simon, 1887 – Australia
- Kiama Main & Mascord, 1969 – Australia
- Micromygale Platnick & Forster, 1982 – Panama
- Microstigmata Strand, 1932 – South Africa
- Ministigmata Raven & Platnick, 1981 – Brazil
- Pastaza Dupérré & Tapia, 2025 – Ecuador
- Pseudonemesia Caporiacco, 1955 – Colombia, Ecuador, Venezuela
- Spelocteniza Gertsch, 1982 – Ecuador
- Tonton Passanha, Cizauskas & Brescovit, 2019 – Brazil
- Xamiatus Raven, 1981 – Australia
