= List of Euctenizidae species =

This page lists all described species of the spider family Euctenizidae accepted by the World Spider Catalog as of January 2021:

== Apomastus ==
Apomastus Bond & Opell, 2002

- A. kristenae Bond, 2004 — USA
- A. schlingeri Bond & Opell, 2002 (type) — USA

== Aptostichus ==
Aptostichus

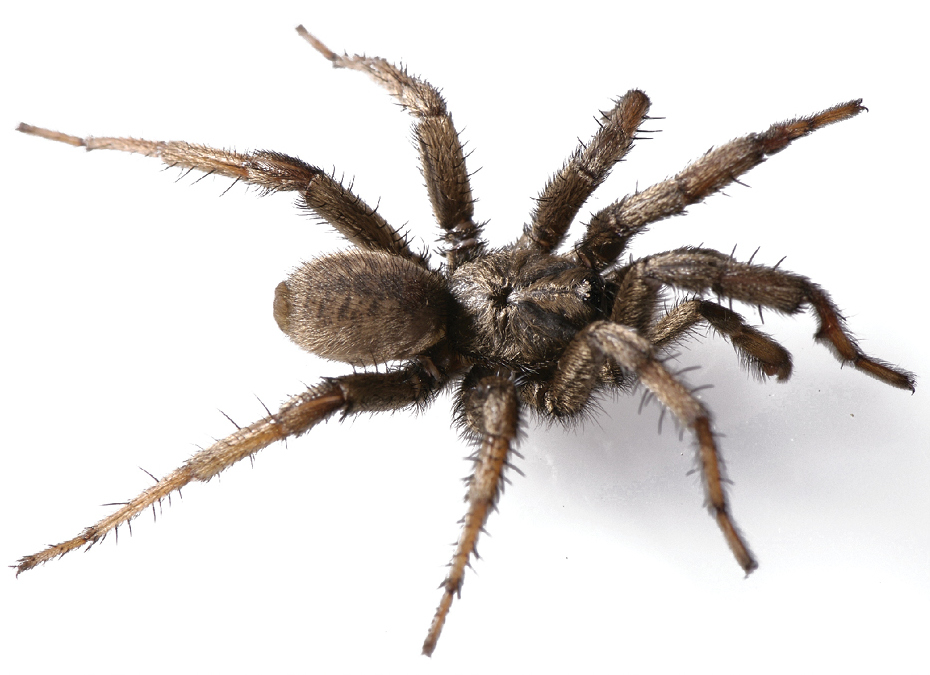
Angelina Jolie trapdoor spider
(Aptostichus angelinajolieae), male

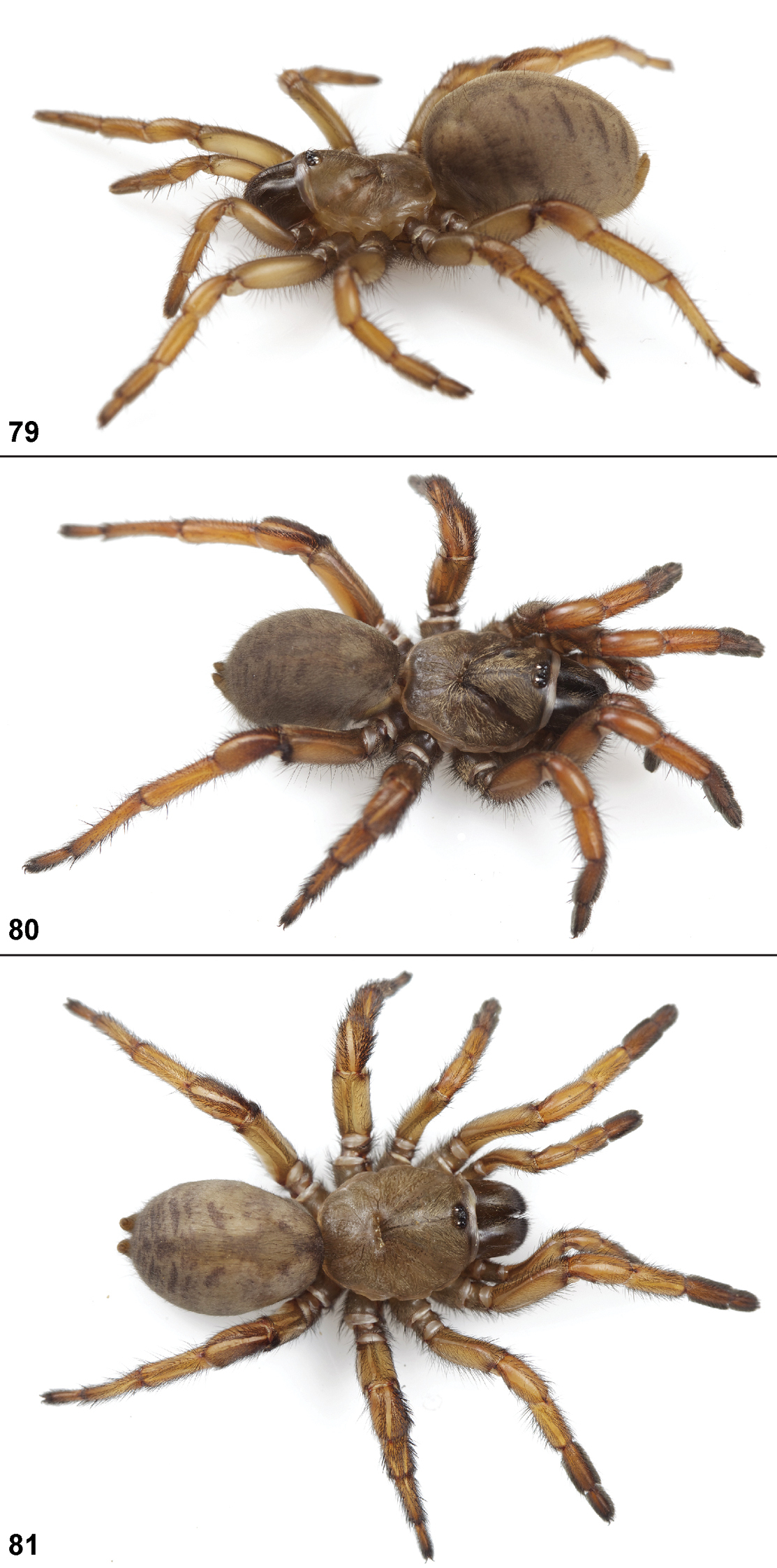
San Bernardino Hills trapdoor spider (Aptostichus atomarius)

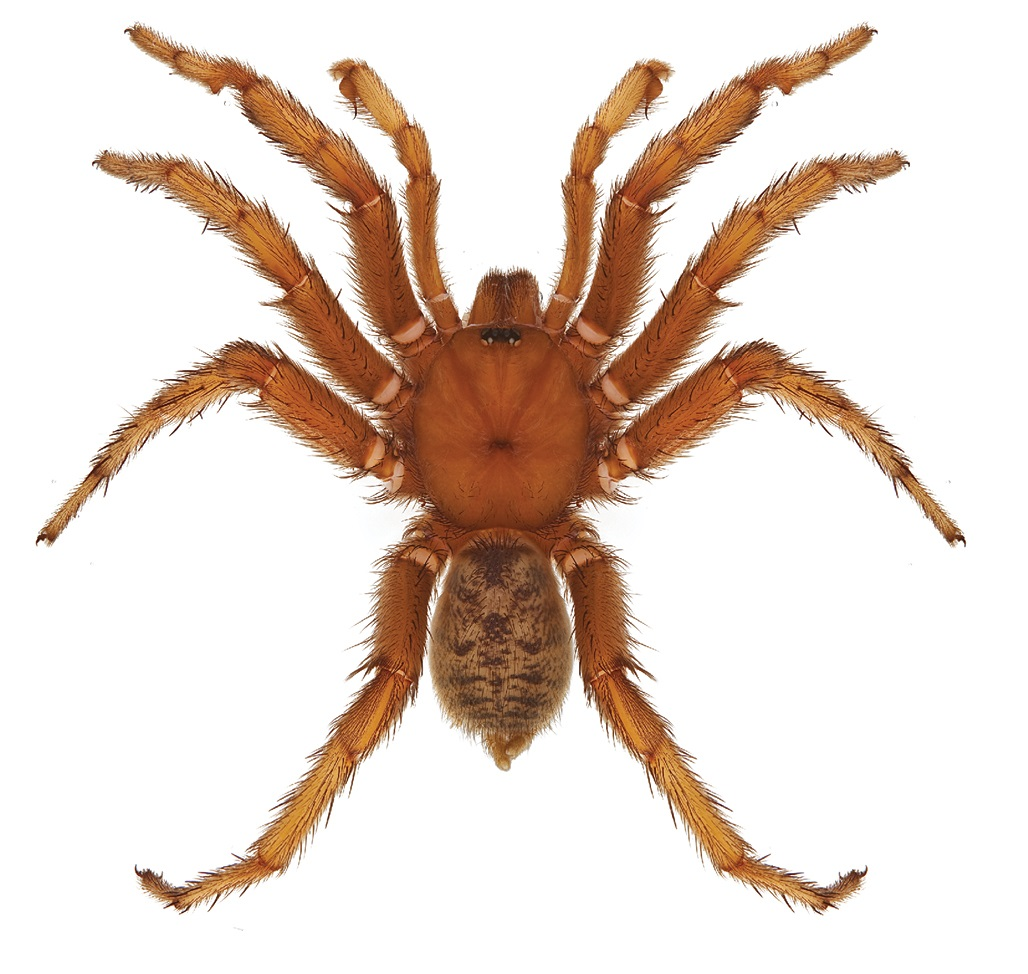
Barack Obama trapdoor spider
(Aptostichus barackobamai)

Aptostichus Simon, 1891

- A. aguacaliente Bond, 2012 — USA
- A. angelinajolieae Bond, 2008 — USA
- A. anzaborrego Bond, 2012 — USA
- A. asmodaeus Bond, 2012 — USA
- A. atomarius Simon, 1891 (type) — USA
- A. barackobamai Bond, 2012 — USA
- A. bonoi Bond, 2012 — USA
- A. cabrillo Bond, 2012 — USA, Mexico
- A. cahuilla Bond, 2012 — USA
- A. cajalco Bond, 2012 — USA
- A. chavezi Bond, 2012 — USA
- A. chemehuevi Bond, 2012 — USA
- A. chiricahua Bond, 2012 — USA
- A. dantrippi Bond, 2012 — USA
- A. derhamgiulianii Bond, 2012 — USA
- A. dorothealangeae Bond, 2012 — USA
- A. edwardabbeyi Bond, 2012 — USA
- A. elisabethae Bond, 2012 — USA
- A. fisheri Bond, 2012 — USA
- A. fornax Bond, 2012 — USA
- A. hedinorum Bond, 2012 — USA
- A. hesperus (Chamberlin, 1919) — USA
- A. huntington Bond, 2012 — USA
- A. icenoglei Bond, 2012 — USA, Mexico
- A. isabella Bond, 2012 — USA
- A. killerdana Bond, 2012 — USA
- A. lucerne Bond, 2012 — USA
- A. mikeradtkei Bond, 2012 — USA
- A. miwok Bond, 2008 — USA
- A. muiri Bond, 2012 — USA
- A. nateevansi Bond, 2012 — USA
- A. pennjillettei Bond, 2012 — USA
- A. sabinae Valdez-Mondragón & Cortez-Roldán, 2016 — Mexico
- A. sarlacc Bond, 2012 — USA
- A. satleri Bond, 2012 — USA
- A. serrano Bond, 2012 — USA
- A. sierra Bond, 2012 — USA
- A. simus Chamberlin, 1917 — USA, Mexico
- A. sinnombre Bond, 2012 — USA
- A. stanfordianus Smith, 1908 — USA
- A. stephencolberti Bond, 2008 — USA

== Cryptocteniza ==
Cryptocteniza Bond & Hamilton, 2020

- C. kawtak Bond & Hamilton, 2020 (type) — USA

== Entychides ==
Entychides

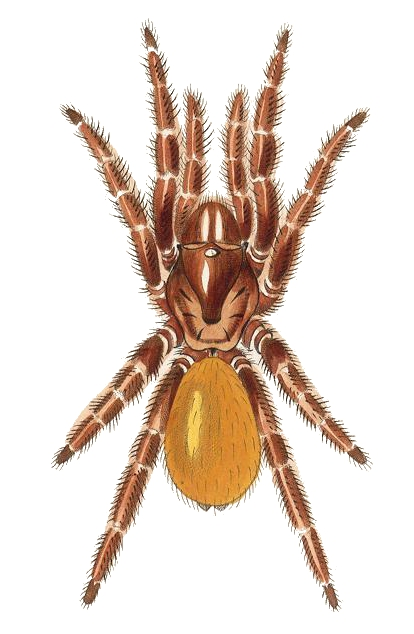
Entychides aurantiacus

Entychides Simon, 1888

- E. arizonicus Gertsch & Wallace, 1936 — USA
- E. aurantiacus Simon, 1888 (type) — Mexico
- E. dugesi Simon, 1888 — Mexico
- E. guadalupensis Simon, 1888 — Guadeloupe

== Eucteniza ==
Eucteniza

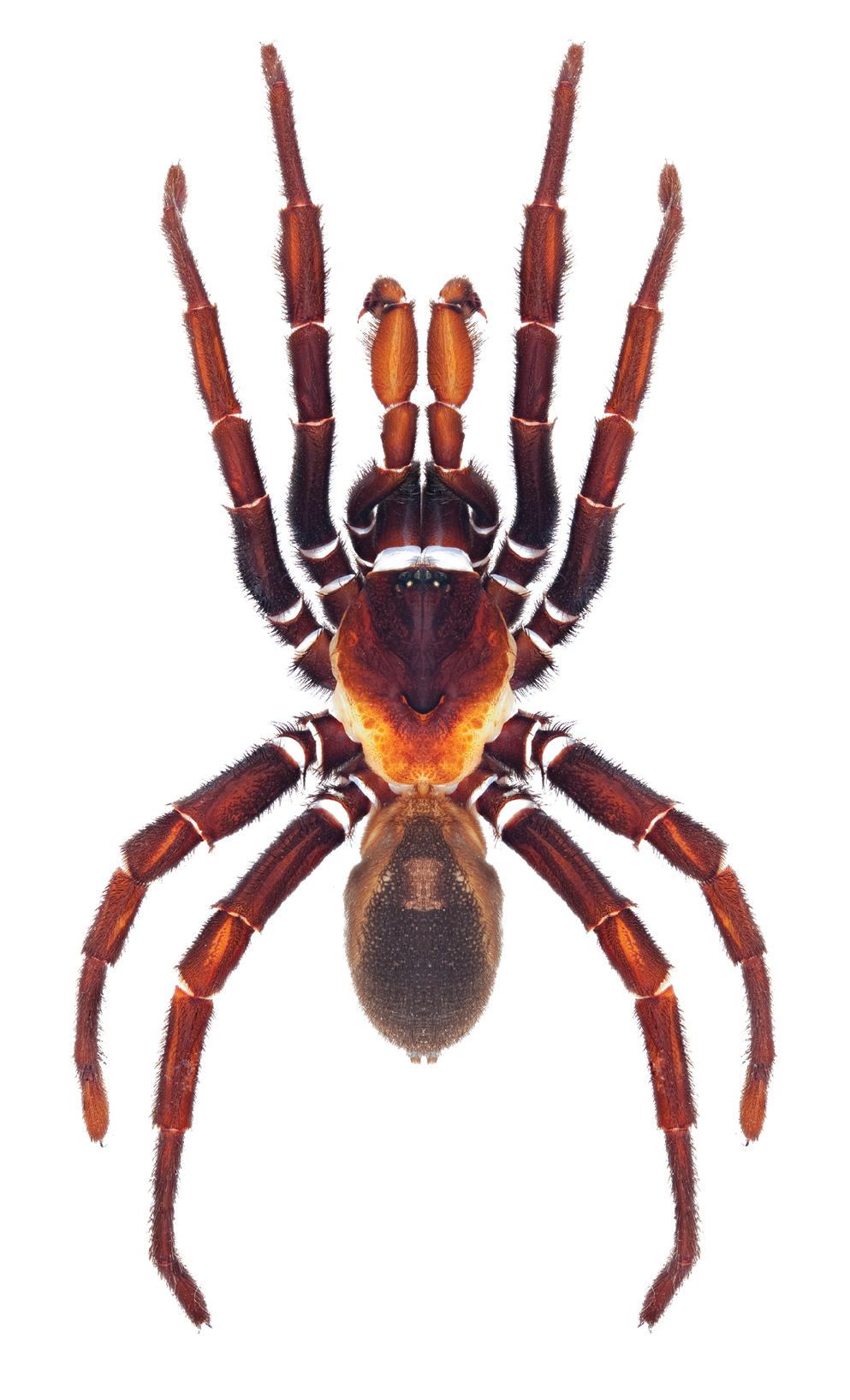
Eucteniza relata, male

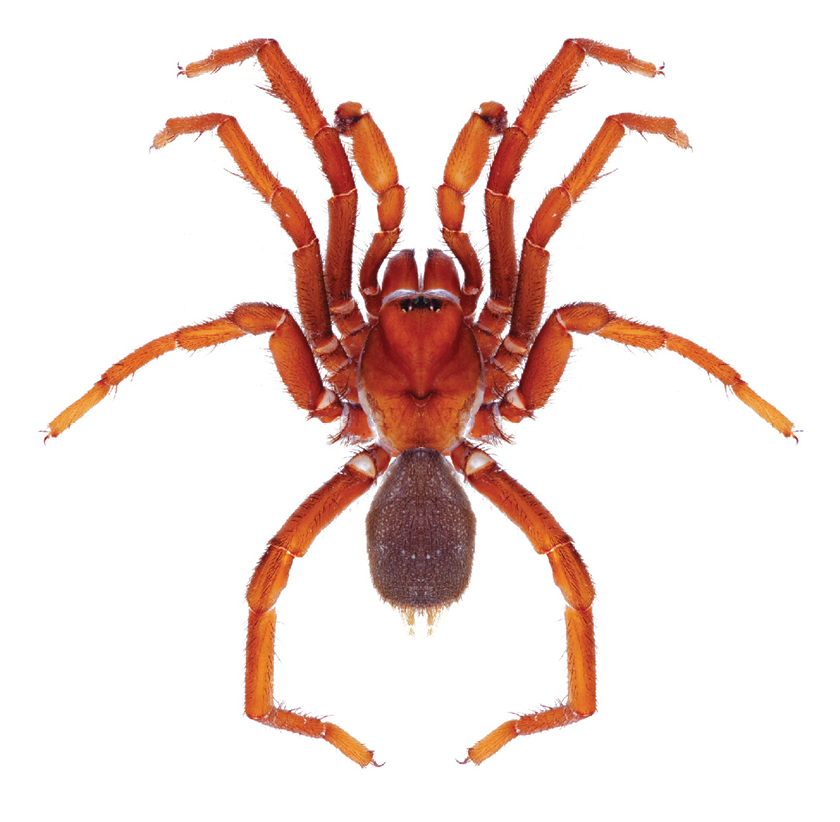
Eucteniza ronnewtoni

Eucteniza Ausserer, 1875

- E. cabowabo Bond & Godwin, 2013 — Mexico
- E. caprica Bond & Godwin, 2013 — Mexico
- E. chichimeca Bond & Godwin, 2013 — Mexico
- E. coylei Bond & Godwin, 2013 — Mexico
- E. diablo Bond & Godwin, 2013 — Mexico
- E. golondrina Bond & Godwin, 2013 — Mexico
- E. hidalgo Bond & Godwin, 2013 — Mexico
- E. huasteca Bond & Godwin, 2013 — Mexico
- E. mexicana Ausserer, 1875 (type) — Mexico
- E. panchovillai Bond & Godwin, 2013 — Mexico
- E. relata (O. Pickard-Cambridge, 1895) — USA, Mexico
- E. ronnewtoni Bond & Godwin, 2013 — USA
- E. rosalia Bond & Godwin, 2013 — Mexico
- E. zapatista Bond & Godwin, 2013 — Mexico

== Myrmekiaphila ==
Myrmekiaphila Atkinson, 1886

- M. comstocki Bishop & Crosby, 1926 — USA
- M. coreyi Bond & Platnick, 2007 — USA
- M. flavipes (Petrunkevitch, 1925) — USA
- M. fluviatilis (Hentz, 1850) — USA
- M. foliata Atkinson, 1886 (type) — USA
- M. howelli Bond & Platnick, 2007 — USA
- M. jenkinsi Bond & Platnick, 2007 — USA
- M. millerae Bond & Platnick, 2007 — USA
- M. minuta Bond & Platnick, 2007 — USA
- M. neilyoungi Bond & Platnick, 2007 — USA
- M. tigris Bond & Ray, 2012 — USA
- M. torreya Gertsch & Wallace, 1936 — USA

== Neoapachella ==
Neoapachella Bond & Opell, 2002

- N. rothi Bond & Opell, 2002 (type) — USA

== Promyrmekiaphila ==
Promyrmekiaphila Schenkel, 1950

- P. clathrata (Simon, 1891) (type) — USA
- P. winnemem Stockman & Bond, 2008 — USA
