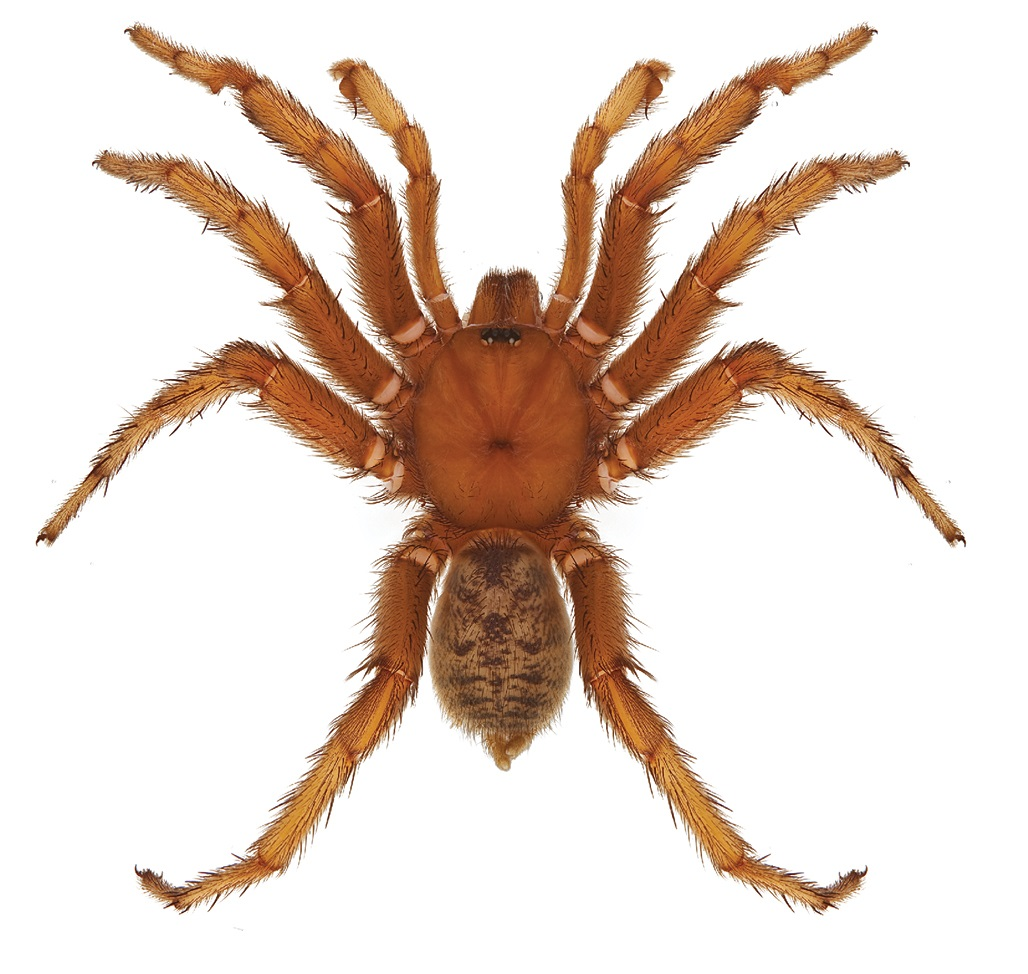
- Male holotype from Mendocino County

Scientific classification
- Kingdom: Animalia
- Phylum: Arthropoda
- Subphylum: Chelicerata
- Class: Arachnida
- Order: Araneae
- Infraorder: Mygalomorphae
- Family: Euctenizidae
- Genus: Aptostichus
- Species: A. barackobamai

Binomial name
- Aptostichus barackobamai Bond, 2012

= Aptostichus barackobamai =

Barack Obama trapdoor spider

Trapdoor spider from California named after Barack Obama

Aptostichus barackobamai (also known as the Barack Obama trapdoor spider) is a large species of trapdoor spider in the family Euctenizidae named after the 44th President of the United States, Barack Obama. The species was first reported by Jason Bond of Auburn University in December 2012 as one of 33 new species of the genus Aptostichus. The species is endemic throughout northern California, forming burrows out of silk, dirt, and sand, from which it attacks prey. This spider is identified by its dark red to red-brown coloration with a stripped or chevron patterned abdomen. Breeding occurs during the winter and females tend to be larger than their male counterparts. A. barackobamai is part of the larger Aptostichus icenoglei species complex, and is a close relative to Aptostichus icenoglei and Aptostichus isabella.

== Taxonomy ==
Aptostichus barackobamai is a species of trapdoor spider within the Euctenizidae family. The species was first described by Jason Bond, director of the Auburn University Museum of Natural History, in December 2012. The specific name, barackobamai, is in honor of former United States president Barack Obama. A. barackobamai was one of 33 new species of the genus Aptostichus described in Bond's paper, many of which are named after famous individuals. Aptostichus barackobamai is one of many species named after Barack Obama, and is also known as the Barack Obama trapdoor spider.

=== Species group and evolution ===
Aptostichus barackobamai, Aptostichus icenoglei, and Aptostichus isabella are all members of the Aptostichus icenoglei species complex. A barackobamai was likely the first member of this species group to diverge following the uplift of the Transverse Ranges in California approximately 5 million years ago, isolating the ancestral species and prevented any further gene flow. Despite this, all three species demonstrate niche conservatism between each other, particularly in their habitat preferences. The following cladogram shows the phylogenetic position of A. barackobamai among the members of the Aptostichus icenoglei species complex based upon ancestral reconstruction, along with an assessment of 403 loci:

- - - Aptostichus barackobamai
    - - Aptostichus isabella
      - Aptostichus icenoglei

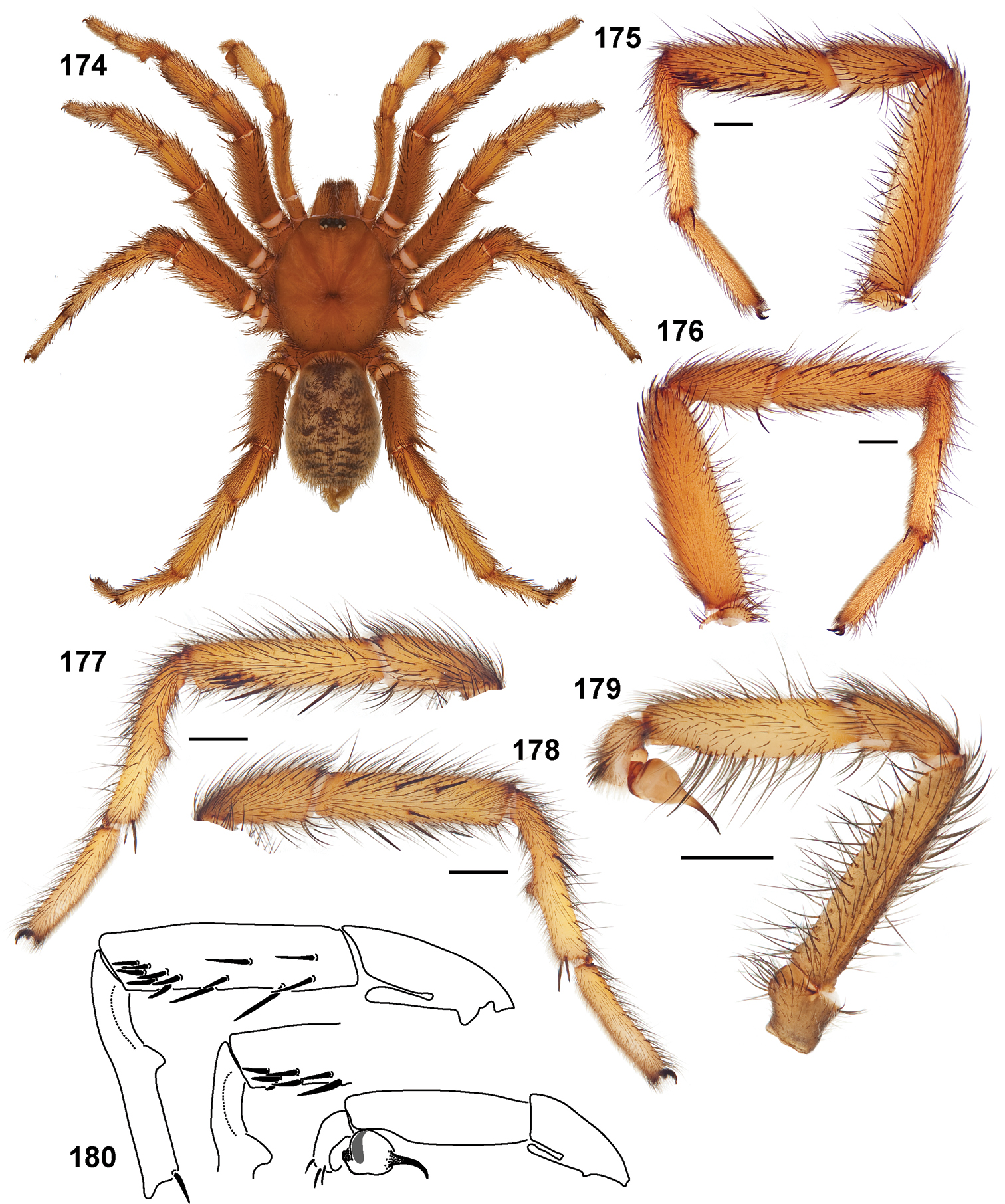
Male holotype with leg specifications

== Description ==
Aptostichus barackobamai is a species of large, sexually dimorphic spiders. Males' legs, carapaces, and chelicerae are a dark red color. Their abdomen is a red-brown with mottled stripes running dorsally. The cephalothorax's carapace is 5.94 centimetres (2.34 in) long and 5.06 centimetres (1.99 in) wide. Their cephalothorax is covered in white setae, has short black bristles along the outside edges, and the topside of the cephalothorax is smooth. The foveal groove is narrow, deep, and slightly curved forward. Their eyes are slightly raised relative to the head. The posterior sternal sigilla are moderately sized, non-contiguous, and positioned close to the margin. The anterior sigilla are smaller, oval, and also close to the margins. The chelicerae consist of a row of six denticles, and the palpal endites have one cuspule along its edge. The rastellum (a rake-like burrowing part of the jaw) is made up of 6 spines. The abdomen is covered in thick and fine black setae. The legs are covered heavily in scopulae. The pedipalp is slender and lacking in spines. The palpal bulb is broad at its base, spineless, and tapers to a sharp point.

Females differ from the males in that their carapace, legs, and chelicerae tend to be a red-brown color and their abdomen has a mottled chevron pattern. Females tend to be larger, their cephalothorax's carapace is 8 centimetres (3.1 in) long and 6.88 centimetres (2.71 in) wide. Their cephalothorax is covered with both black and white intermingled setae but the outside edges lack setae. Their chelicerae consist of eight teeth and the palpal endites have twelve cuspules. The rastellium has 7 short spines all in a row that extend out and upwards. The female's anterior legs are more slender than their posterior pair. Their spermathecal bulbs form a long, curved stalk.

Aptostichus barackobamai can be differentiated from other Aptostichus species by the male's spination pattern, which is offset proximally. Additionally, the male metatarsal mating apophysis is a triangular shape. Females have a spermathecal bulb located along the medial auxiliary segment, unlike other members of the genus. Aptostichus isabella is the closest in appearance to A. barackobamai but have a rectangular mating apophysis instead.

=== Behavior ===
A. barackobamai burrows underground for shelter, making waterproof 'trapdoor' structures out of soil, sand, and webbing. From these burrows, the spider will strike at prey, a common behavior among trapdoor spiders. Breeding season occurs during the winter months. Spiders may go longer periods of time without feeding to better camouflage themselves.

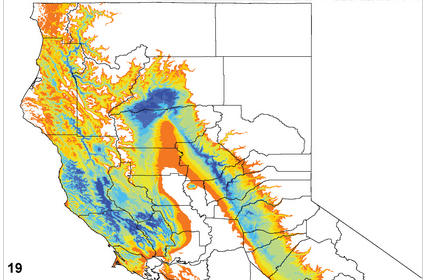
Estimated range of Aptostichus barackobamai, Cooler colors indicate higher probability of occurrence while warmer colors represent a lower probability.

== Distribution ==
Aptostichus barackobamai is a species endemic to California, and has been observed at several locations in the northern part of the state. Originally, the species was believed to be isolated to the locality of Hopland, California, due to its apparent rarity, but specimen have since been found throughout north-central California. Particular locations where populations are known to exist are Mendocino, Napa, Shasta, Sutter, and Tehama counties. Geographically, these include the Mayacamas Mountains, the Sutter Buttes, parts of the California Floristic Province, and the northernmost ridges of the Central Valley. While no specimen have been found yet to corroborate a wider distribution, predictions by Jason Bond estimate that the species likely inhabits the majority of the Central Valley and its eastern mountain ranges.

A. barackobamai's habitat consists of mixed redwood and coniferous forests. Their microhabitat is mainly shady, north-facing slopes.

=== Conservation status ===
Due to the wide range and abundance of A. barackobamai's population, the species is not considered to be threatened, overall. Jason Bond, during his initial description of the species, postulated that some isolated populations (such as those local to the Sutter Buttes) may be threatened.

== See also ==
- Aptostichus stephencolberti
- Aptostichus angelinajolieae
- Aptostichus bonoi
- List of things named after Barack Obama
- List of organisms named after famous people (born 1950–1974)
