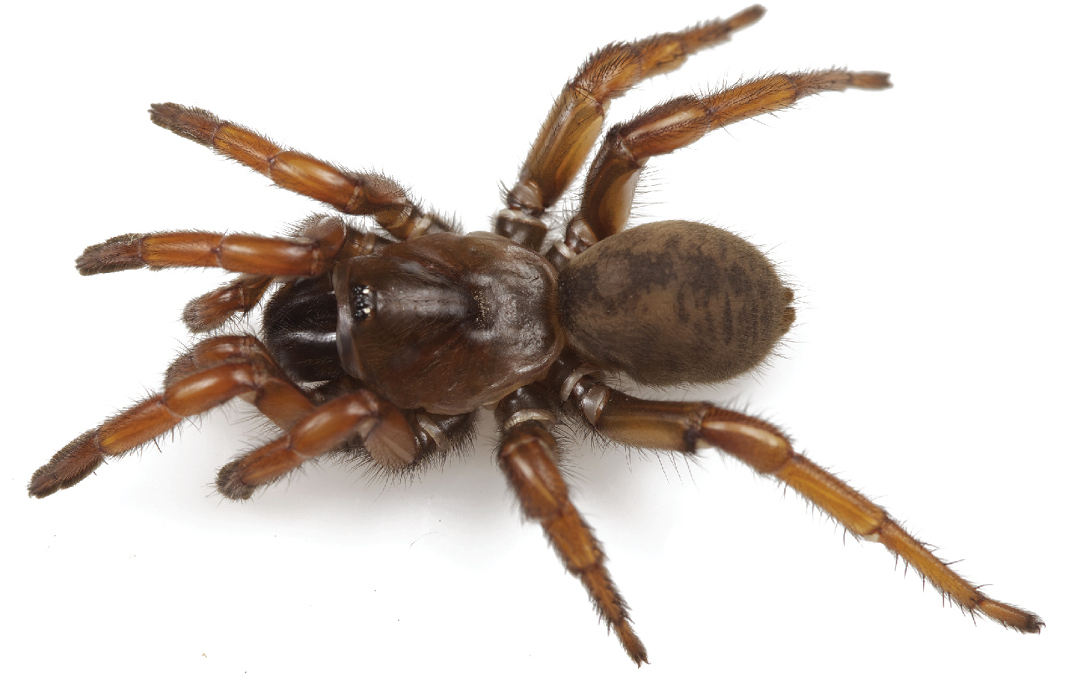
- Female specimen
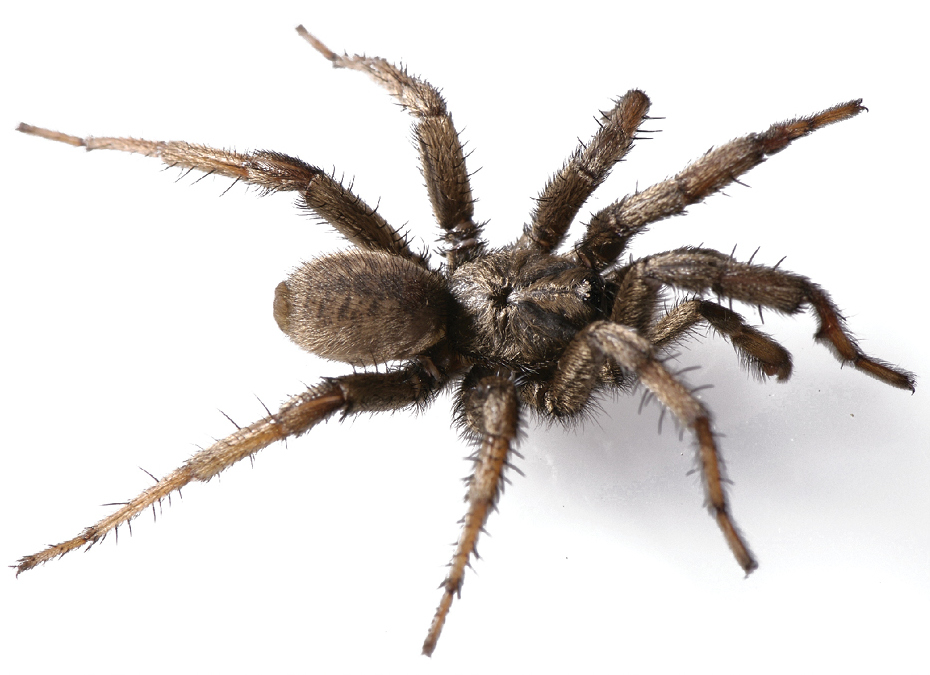
- Male specimen

Scientific classification
- Kingdom: Animalia
- Phylum: Arthropoda
- Subphylum: Chelicerata
- Class: Arachnida
- Order: Araneae
- Infraorder: Mygalomorphae
- Family: Euctenizidae
- Genus: Aptostichus
- Species: A. angelinajolieae

Binomial name
- Aptostichus angelinajolieae Bond, 2008

= Aptostichus angelinajolieae =

Angelina Jolie trapdoor spider

Species of spider

Aptostichus angelinajolieae, also known as the Angelina Jolie trapdoor spider, is a species of Euctenizidae, nocturnal arthropods who seize their prey after leaping out of their burrows and inject it with venom. It was described by the Auburn University professor Jason Bond in 2008, who named it after the American actress Angelina Jolie in recognition of her work on the United Nations High Commission for Refugees. It was one of only seven described species of Aptostichus until 2012, when it was joined by Bono's Joshua Tree trapdoor spider and 32 other species.

== Identification and distribution ==
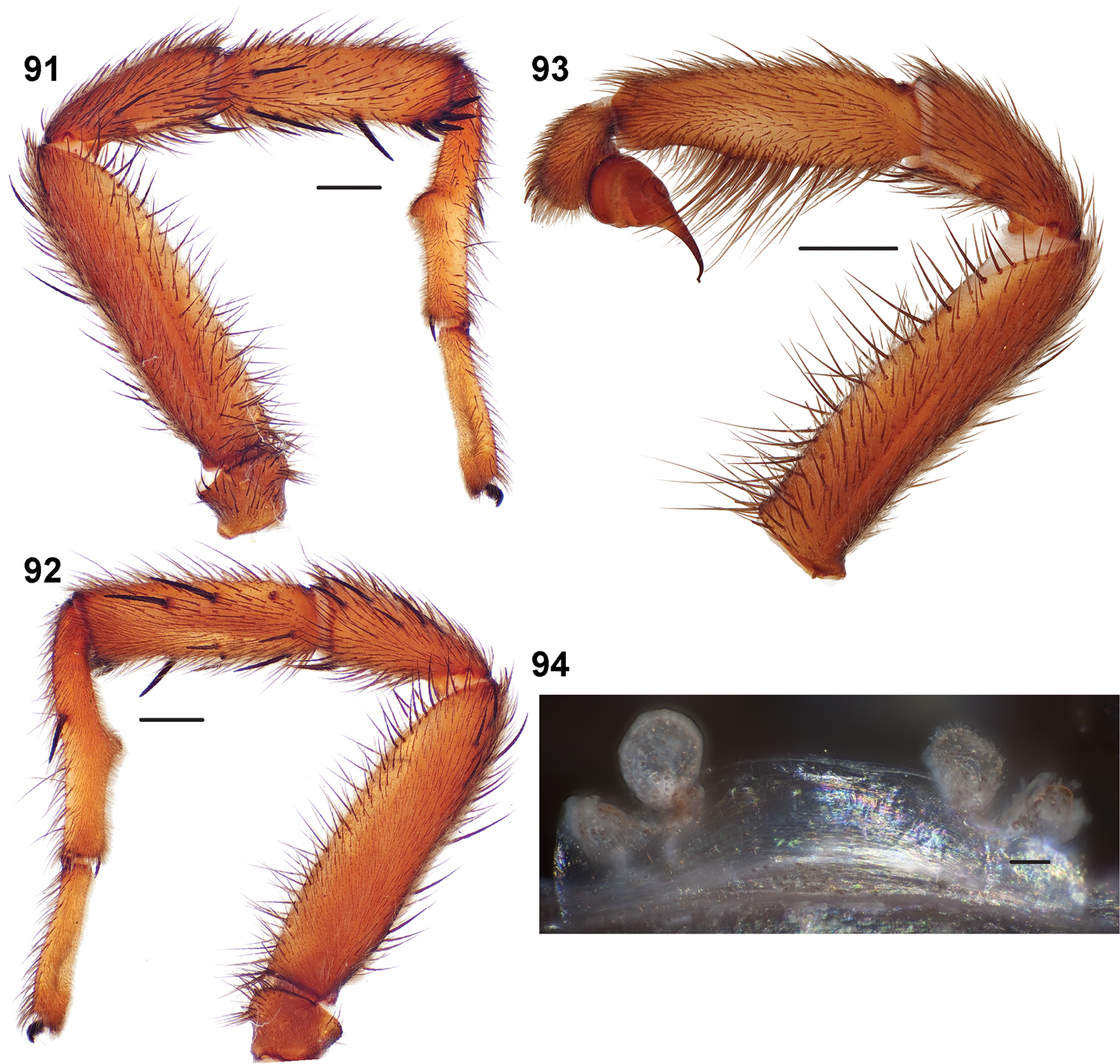
91–93 – male paratype. 91 – retrolateral aspect right leg I. 92 – prolateral aspect right leg I. 93 – retrolateral aspect pedipalp. 94 – cleared spermathecae, female holotype.

It is difficult to identify an individual as being an A. angelinajolieae specimen due to the species' morphological similarity to A. atomarius and A. stanfordianus. A set of unique mitochondrial DNA nucleotide substitutions sets the species apart and allows a diagnosis. A. angelinajolieae inhabits the north of Monterey County, California, restricted to the Santa Lucia Range west of the Salinas Valley, which probably serves as a dispersal barrier. Its ecoregion consists of chaparral forest and shrub. It is not found in the coastal dunes, which are the habitat of the geographically proximate but lighter colored A. stephencolberti. Female specimens are normally seen on road cuts and humid, shaded steep banks. The species creates shallow burrows with a thin silk-soil trapdoor and white silken lined retreat.

== Taxonomy ==
Due to the Salinas Valley barrier, there is no genetic exchangeability between Aptostichus angelinajolieae and other Aptostichus species. This and the species' exclusivity as a lineage in DNA studies makes it a cohesion species. A. angelinajolieae belongs to the Atomarius Sibling Species Complex along with the closely related species A. atomarius, A. dantrippi, A. miwok, A. stanfordianus and A. stephencolberti.

== Conservation status ==
In addition to being widespread and abundant in its range, the Angelina Jolie trapdoor spider flourishes in moderately developed residential areas. Therefore, in terms of its conservation status, it is not considered to be a threatened species.

== See also ==
- List of organisms named after famous people (born 1975–present)
