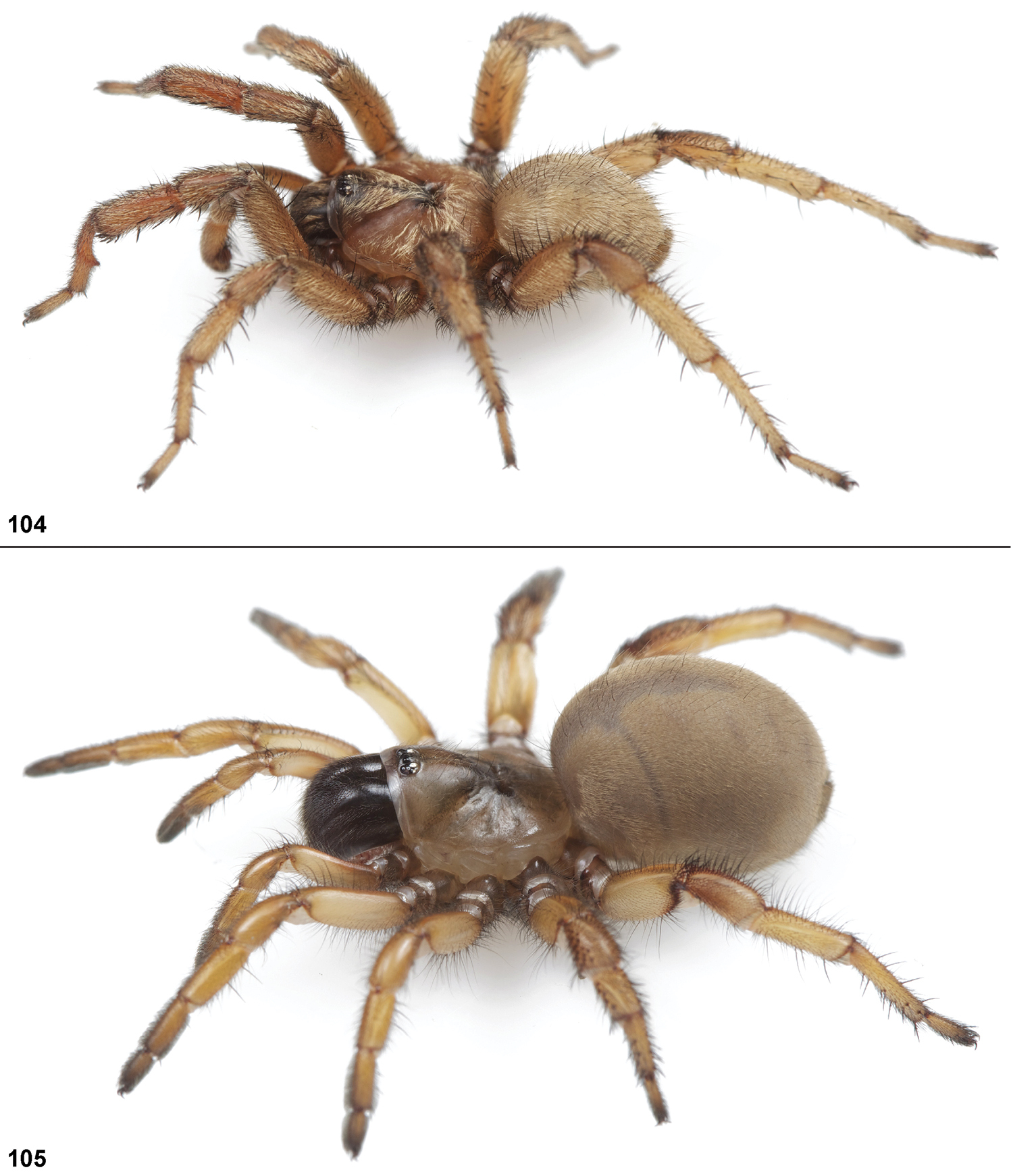
- Male (top) and female

Scientific classification
- Domain: Eukaryota
- Kingdom: Animalia
- Phylum: Arthropoda
- Subphylum: Chelicerata
- Class: Arachnida
- Order: Araneae
- Infraorder: Mygalomorphae
- Family: Euctenizidae
- Genus: Aptostichus
- Species: A. miwok

Binomial name
- Aptostichus miwok Bond, 2008

= Aptostichus miwok =

Species of spider

Aptostichus miwok is a species of spiders in the family Euctenizidae named after the Coast Miwok Indian tribe known to have inhabited the coastal areas of California from the Golden Gate northward prior to European settlement. It is similar to the Aptostichus angelinajolieae named after actress Angelina Jolie and Aptostichus stephencolberti named after satirist Stephen Colbert described by the same author.
