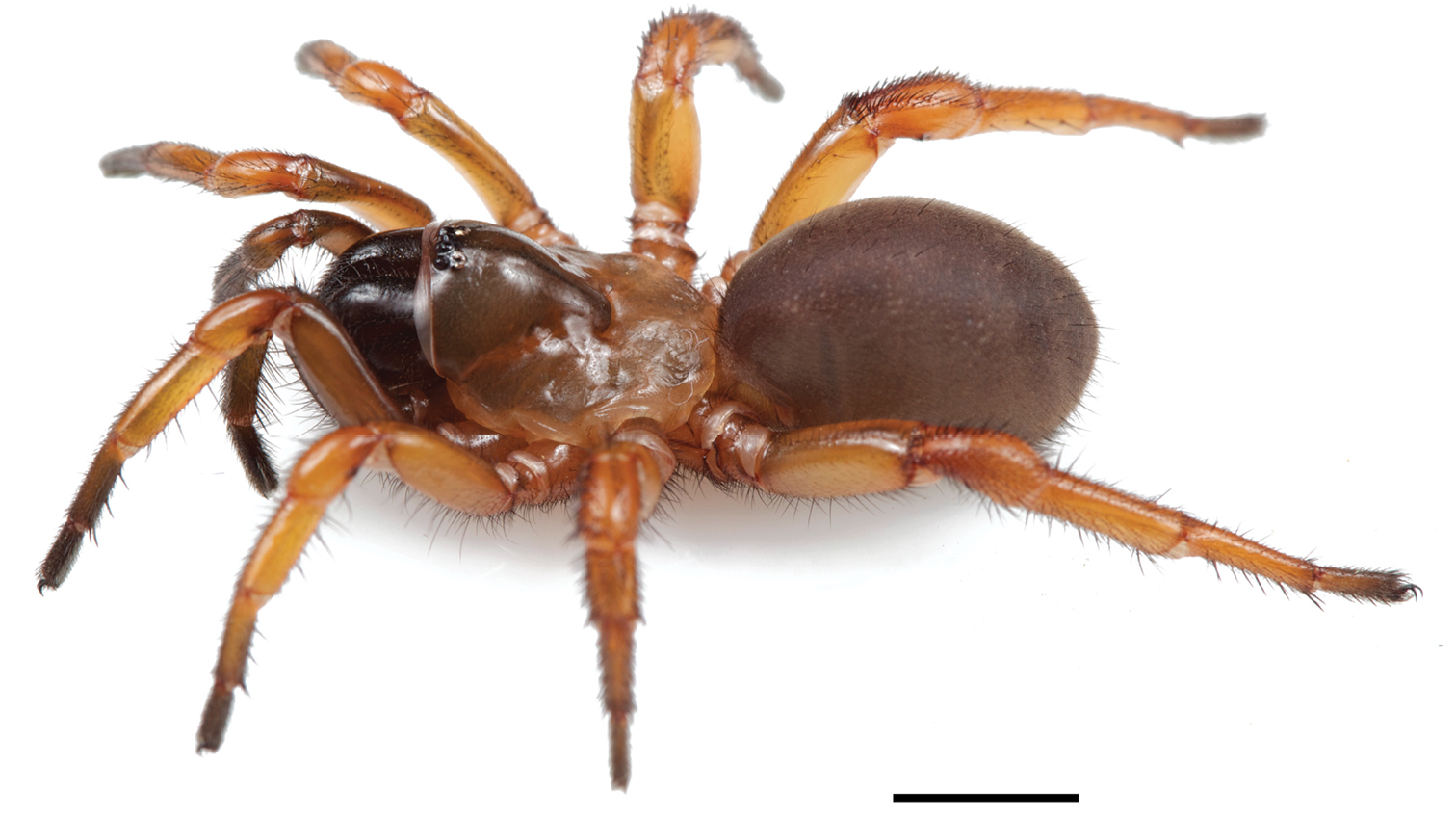
- Myrmekiaphila tigris

Scientific classification
- Kingdom: Animalia
- Phylum: Arthropoda
- Subphylum: Chelicerata
- Class: Arachnida
- Order: Araneae
- Infraorder: Mygalomorphae
- Family: Euctenizidae
- Genus: Myrmekiaphila; Atkinson, 1886

Type species
- M. foliata Atkinson, 1886

Species
- 12, see text

= Myrmekiaphila =

Genus of spiders

Myrmekiaphila is a genus of North American mygalomorph trapdoor spiders in the family Euctenizidae, and was first described by G. F. Atkinson in 1886. All described species are endemic to the southeastern United States.

Originally placed with the Ctenizidae, it was moved to the wafer trapdoor spiders in 1985, then to the Euctenizidae in 2012. Myrmekiaphila appears as the sister group to all southwestern Euctenizidae with the exception of Apomastus, which in turn is the sister group to all euctenizines. M. flavipes was transferred from Aptostichus in 2007.

== Description ==
The known species of this genus resemble each other in appearance and behavior. The carapace is 2.8 to 8 millimetres (0.11 to 0.31 in) long and 2.25 to 6.81 millimetres (0.089 to 0.268 in) wide. Females are uniformly colored, with some dusky stripes on the dorsum of the abdomen. Colors range from yellowish red to dark reddish brown. The palpal tibia of the males are modified in a way that distinguishes them from other mygalomorph spiders of North America. The first legs in males are modified as mating claspers.

All members live in subterranean, silk-lined burrows covered by a silken-soil trap door. Some species construct side chambers that can be closed off by secondary trap doors, a unique feature among Cyrtaucheniidae. While the related Promyrmekiaphila and Aptostichus also build side chambers, they do not close them with trap doors.

G. F. Atkinson collected his specimens while hunting for ants, often finding them in close proximity to ant nests. The genus name is derived from the Ancient Greek μύρμηξ (myrmex), meaning "ant", and φιλία (philein), meaning "to love", referencing their apparent fondness of ant nests.

== Species ==
As of May 2019 it contains twelve species restricted to the southeastern United States, but found in a wide variety of habitats. These range from northern Virginia along the Appalachian Mountains southward through West Virginia, Kentucky, North and South Carolina, Tennessee and northern Georgia into the southeastern plain of Alabama, Mississippi Florida, and the temperate deciduous forest of central Texas with dry climates and relatively high altitudes.

- Myrmekiaphila comstocki Bishop & Crosby, 1926 – USA
- Myrmekiaphila coreyi Bond & Platnick, 2007 – USA
- Myrmekiaphila flavipes (Petrunkevitch, 1925) – USA
- Myrmekiaphila fluviatilis (Hentz, 1850) – USA
- Myrmekiaphila foliata Atkinson, 1886 (type) – USA
- Myrmekiaphila howelli Bond & Platnick, 2007 – USA
- Myrmekiaphila jenkinsi Bond & Platnick, 2007 – USA
- Myrmekiaphila millerae Bond & Platnick, 2007 – USA
- Myrmekiaphila minuta Bond & Platnick, 2007 – USA
- Myrmekiaphila neilyoungi Bond & Platnick, 2007 – USA
- Myrmekiaphila tigris Bond & Ray, 2012 – USA
- Myrmekiaphila torreya Gertsch & Wallace, 1936 – USA

Three species groups are currently recognized. These are only intended to facilitate identification based on the male palp; it is not known if they represent monophyletic taxa. M. flavipes is only known from females and thus not grouped.

- foliata group

- Myrmekiaphila comstocki Bishop & Crosby, 1926
- Myrmekiaphila coreyi Bond & Platnick, 2007
- Myrmekiaphila foliata Atkinson, 1886
- Myrmekiaphila tigris Bond et al., 2012

- fluviatilis group

- Myrmekiaphila fluviatilis (Hentz, 1850)
- Myrmekiaphila howelli Bond & Platnick, 2007
- Myrmekiaphila jenkinsi Bond & Platnick, 2007
- Myrmekiaphila millerae Bond & Platnick, 2007
- Myrmekiaphila neilyoungi Bond & Platnick, 2007
- Myrmekiaphila torreya Gertsch & Wallace, 1936

- minuta group

- Myrmekiaphila minuta Bond & Platnick, 2007

- unplaced species

- Myrmekiaphila flavipes (Petrunkevitch, 1925)
