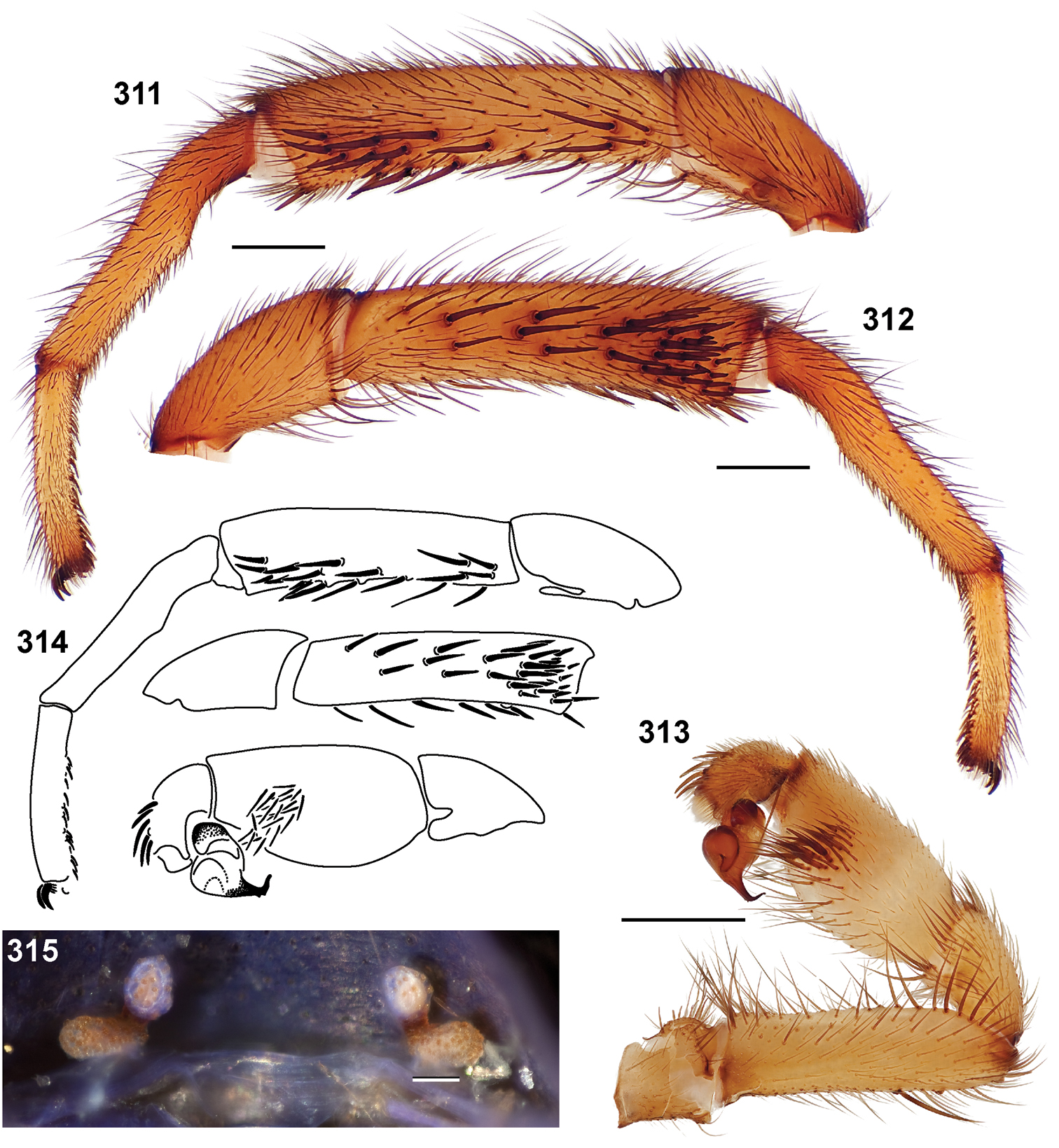
- Female specimen

Scientific classification
- Kingdom: Animalia
- Phylum: Arthropoda
- Subphylum: Chelicerata
- Class: Arachnida
- Order: Araneae
- Infraorder: Mygalomorphae
- Family: Euctenizidae
- Genus: Aptostichus
- Species: A. bonoi

Binomial name
- Aptostichus bonoi Bond, 2012

= Aptostichus bonoi =

Bono's Joshua Tree trapdoor spider

Species of spider

Aptostichus bonoi, or Bono's Joshua Tree trapdoor spider, is a morphological species of Euctenizidae spiders, nocturnal arthropods who seize their prey after leaping out of their burrows and inject it with venom. The species was found in Joshua Tree National Park, California, and described by the Auburn University professor Jason Bond in 2012. Only seven species of Aptostichus were known prior to 2012, including the Angelina Jolie trapdoor spider.

== Etymology ==
The species was named after the Irish rock band U2's singer Bono in honor of the band's 1987 album The Joshua Tree.

== Description ==
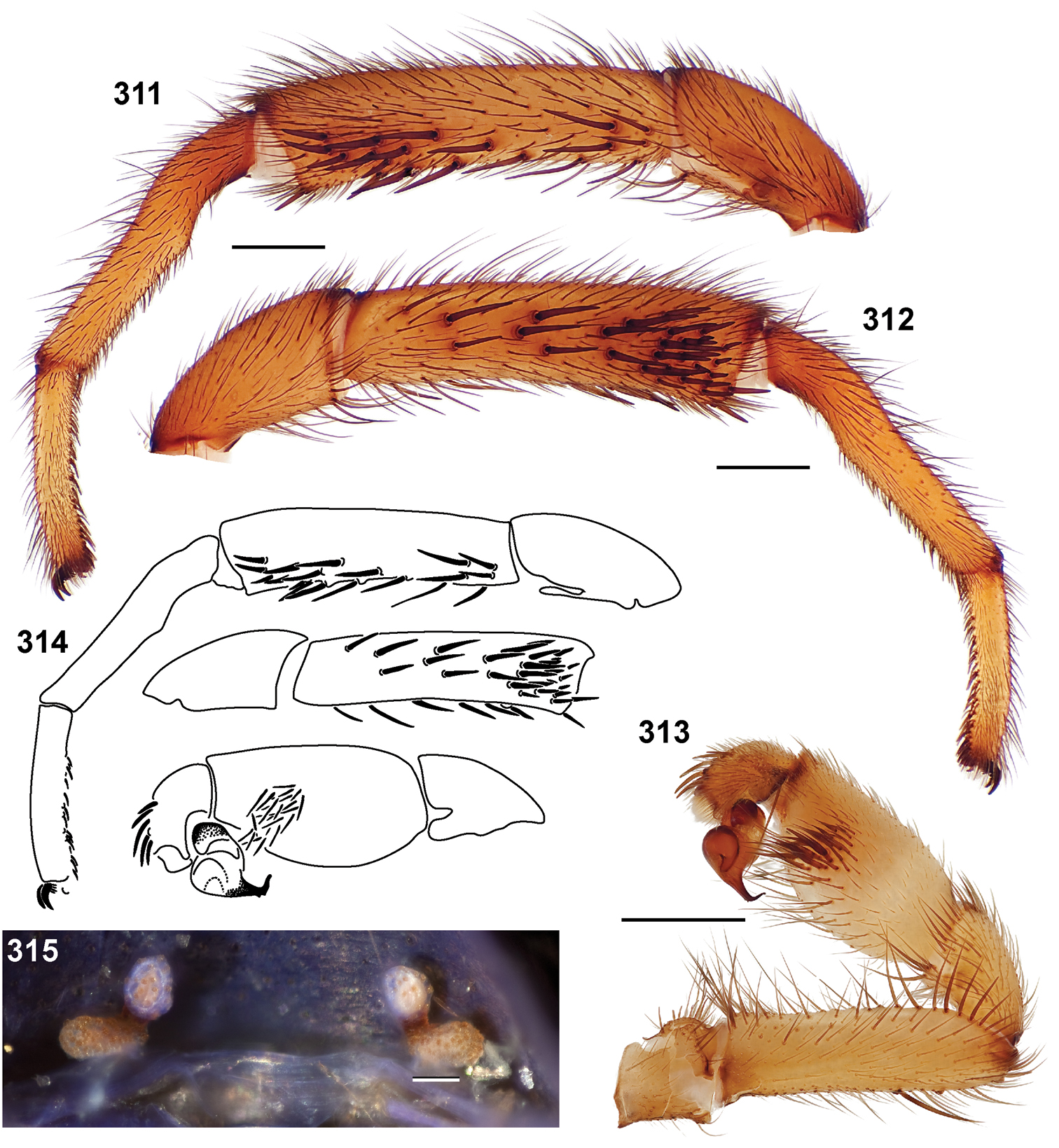
Figures 311–314 - male holotype. 311 - retrolateral aspect, leg I. 312 - prolateral aspect, leg I. 313 - retrolateral aspect, pedipalp. 314 - line drawings of leg I spination pattern and pedipalp. 315 - cleared spermathecae, female paratype.

Unlike males of the rest of the Aptostichus species, male specimens of A. bonoi and A. fisheri barely have scopula pads and possess short but distinctive spines on the ventral surface of tarsus I. The two species differ in that A. bonoi has significantly more spines on the retrolateral surface of tibia I. A. bonoi is one of only two sympatric species of Aptostichus, the other one being A. serrano. The two species are easily distinguished from one another due by spines on the retrolateral surface I, which A. serrano lacks.

Aptostichus bonoi was described on the basis of only one male and one female type specimen; the male is the holotype and is presumed to have been collected from a pitfall trap, while the female is the paratype and was presumably caught live in her burrow. The species is known only from an area of Joshua Tree National Park called Covington Flat, which is the type locality. The available data is very limited, but it is assumed that males disperse to look for females from late fall until early winter.

== Conservation status ==
Due to the very limited range of the species and its scarceness in collections, it is probable that Bono's Joshua Tree trapdoor spider is endangered in terms of its conservation status. According to Bond, the protection of the species is critical.

== See also ==
- List of organisms named after famous people (born 1950–1974)
