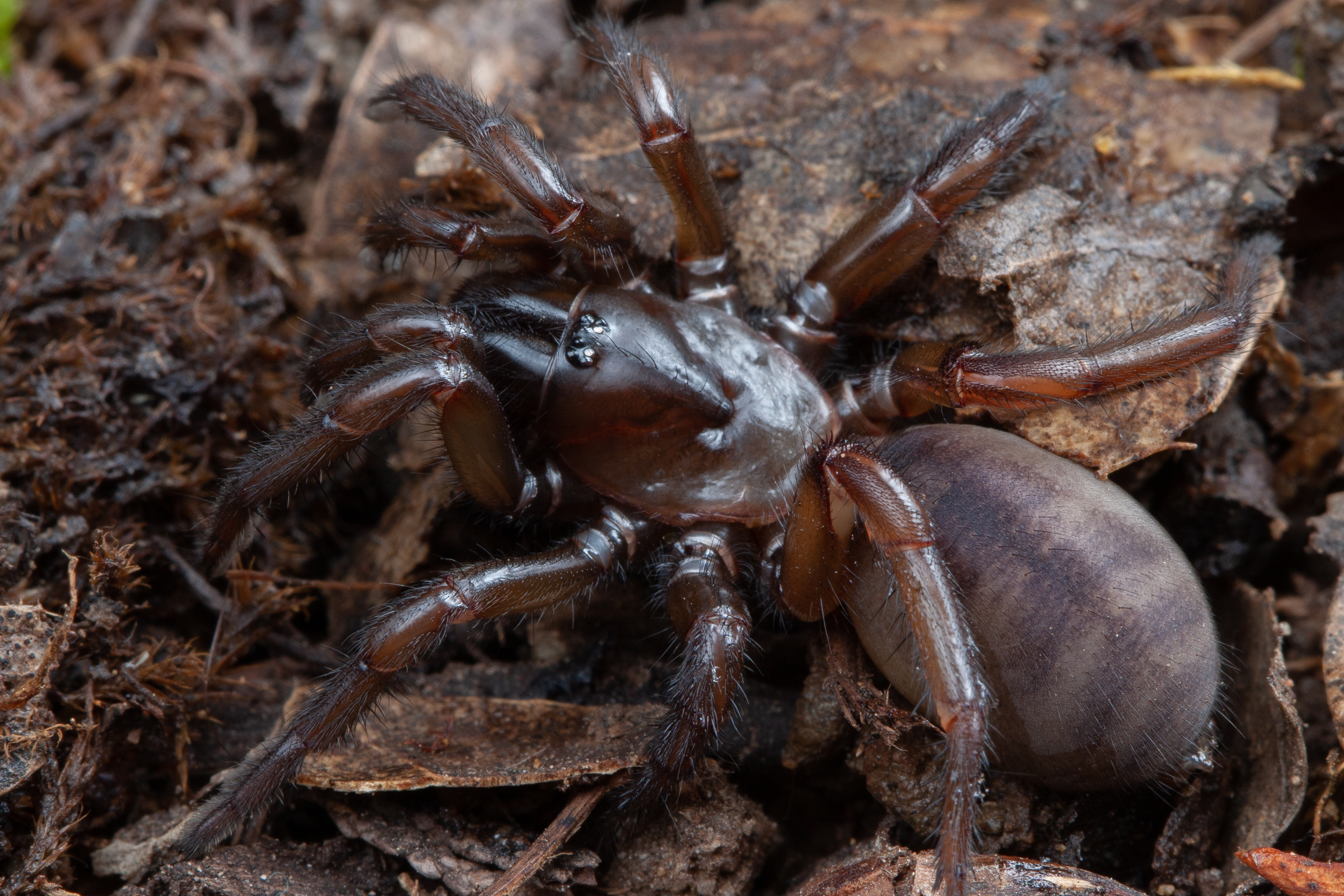

Scientific classification
- Kingdom: Animalia
- Phylum: Arthropoda
- Subphylum: Chelicerata
- Class: Arachnida
- Order: Araneae
- Infraorder: Mygalomorphae
- Family: Euctenizidae
- Genus: Promyrmekiaphila
- Species: P. clathrata

Binomial name
- Promyrmekiaphila clathrata (Simon, 1891)

= Promyrmekiaphila clathrata =

Species of spider

Promyrmekiaphila clathrata is a species of wafer-lid trapdoor spider in the family Euctenizidae that is endemic to the state of California in the United States. Its range is restricted to the central and northern California Coast Ranges, from San Benito County to Glenn County. Like its sister species, C. winnemem, it can be distinguished from species in similar genera by the dusky chevron pattern on its abdomen. It prefers vegetated, mesic habitats that retain some moisture, where it builds burrows in soil up to 30 cm deep. Like other members of this family, it covers its burrow entrance with a door made of silk and soil.
