= Neoapachella =

Scientific classification
- Domain: Eukaryota
- Kingdom: Animalia
- Phylum: Arthropoda
- Subphylum: Chelicerata
- Class: Arachnida
- Order: Araneae
- Infraorder: Mygalomorphae
- Family: Euctenizidae
- Genus: Neoapachella; Bond & Opell, 2002
- Species: N. rothi

Binomial name
- Neoapachella rothi Bond & Opell, 2002

Genus of spiders

Neoapachella is a monotypic genus of North American mygalomorph trapdoor spiders in the family Euctenizidae containing the single species, Neoapachella rothi. It was first described by Jason Bond & B. D. Opell in 2002, and has only been found in Arizona and New Mexico. They are small to medium-sized spiders, reaching about 20.7 mm (0.81 in) in body length. It is named in honor of the Apaches as well as arachnologist Vincent D. Roth.
