= Promyrmekiaphila winnemem =

Scientific classification
- Domain: Eukaryota
- Kingdom: Animalia
- Phylum: Arthropoda
- Subphylum: Chelicerata
- Class: Arachnida
- Order: Araneae
- Infraorder: Mygalomorphae
- Family: Euctenizidae
- Genus: Promyrmekiaphila
- Species: P. winnemem

Binomial name
- Promyrmekiaphila winnemem Stockman & Bond, 2008

Species of spider

Promyrmekiaphila winnemem is a species of wafer-lid trapdoor spider in the family Euctenizidae. It is found in the United States.
