= Cryptocteniza =

Scientific classification
- Kingdom: Animalia
- Phylum: Arthropoda
- Subphylum: Chelicerata
- Class: Arachnida
- Order: Araneae
- Infraorder: Mygalomorphae
- Family: Euctenizidae
- Genus: Cryptocteniza; Bond & Hamilton, 2020
- Species: C. kawtak

Binomial name
- Cryptocteniza kawtak Bond & Hamilton, 2020

Genus of spiders

Cryptocteniza is a monotypic genus of North American mygalomorph spiders in the family Euctenizidae containing the single species, Cryptocteniza kawtak. It was first described by Jason Bond, C. A. Hamilton and R. L. Godwin in 2020, and it has only been found in the United States.
