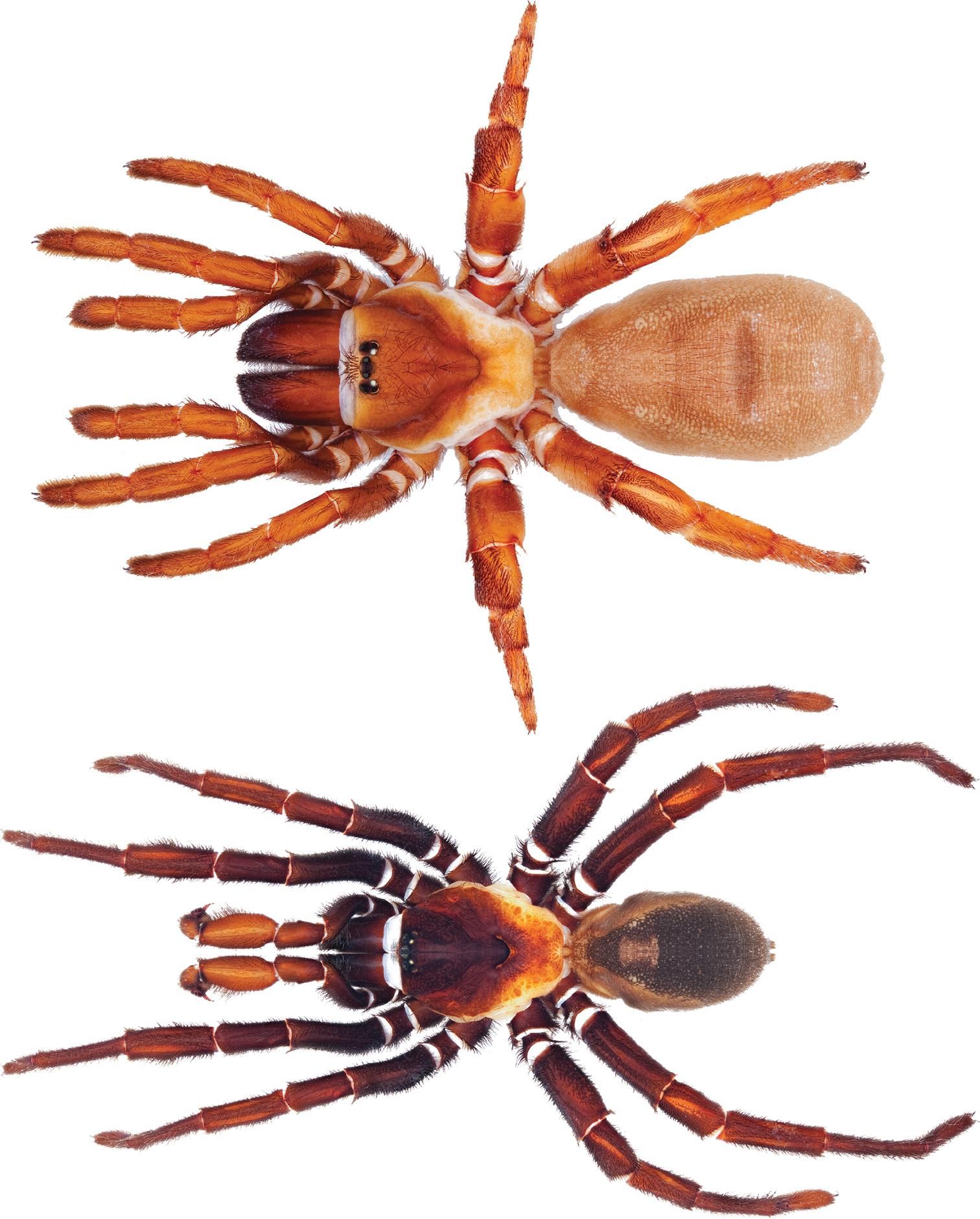

Scientific classification
- Domain: Eukaryota
- Kingdom: Animalia
- Phylum: Arthropoda
- Subphylum: Chelicerata
- Class: Arachnida
- Order: Araneae
- Infraorder: Mygalomorphae
- Family: Euctenizidae
- Genus: Eucteniza
- Species: E. relata

Binomial name
- Eucteniza relata (O. P.-Cambridge, 1895)

= Eucteniza relata =

Species of spider

Eucteniza relata, the southwestern trapdoor spider, is a species of wafer-lid trapdoor spider in the family Euctenizidae. It is found in the United States and Mexico.
