= Myrmekiaphila comstocki =

Scientific classification
- Domain: Eukaryota
- Kingdom: Animalia
- Phylum: Arthropoda
- Subphylum: Chelicerata
- Class: Arachnida
- Order: Araneae
- Infraorder: Mygalomorphae
- Family: Euctenizidae
- Genus: Myrmekiaphila
- Species: M. comstocki

Binomial name
- Myrmekiaphila comstocki Bishop and Crosby, 1926

Species of spider

Myrmekiaphila comstocki is a spider in the family Euctenizidae ("wafer-lid trapdoor spiders"), in the infraorder Mygalomorphae ("mygalomorphs"). The distribution range of Myrmekiaphila comstocki includes the USA and Mexico.
