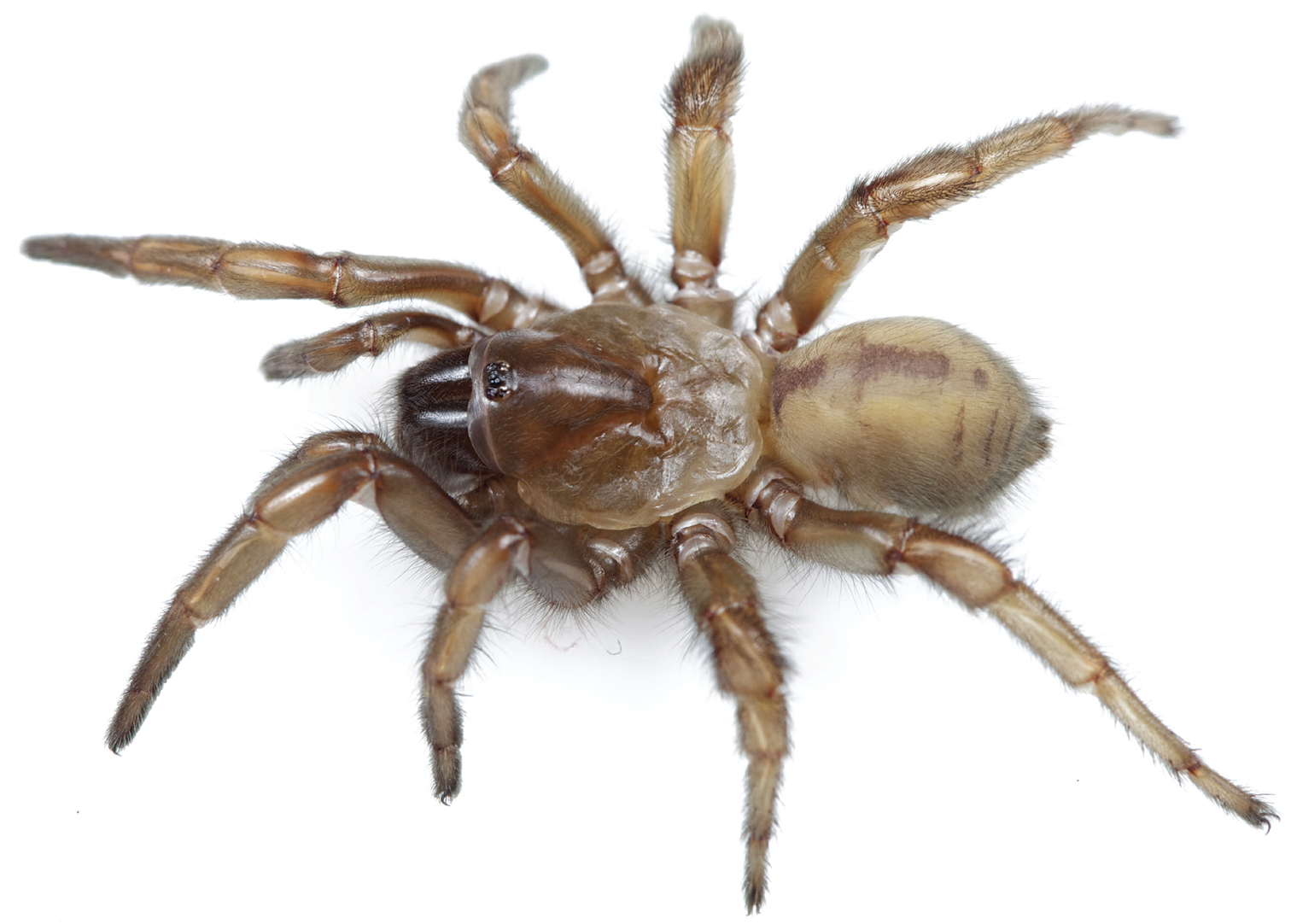

Scientific classification
- Domain: Eukaryota
- Kingdom: Animalia
- Phylum: Arthropoda
- Subphylum: Chelicerata
- Class: Arachnida
- Order: Araneae
- Infraorder: Mygalomorphae
- Family: Euctenizidae
- Genus: Aptostichus
- Species: A. simus

Binomial name
- Aptostichus simus Chamberlain, 1917

= Aptostichus simus =

Species of spider

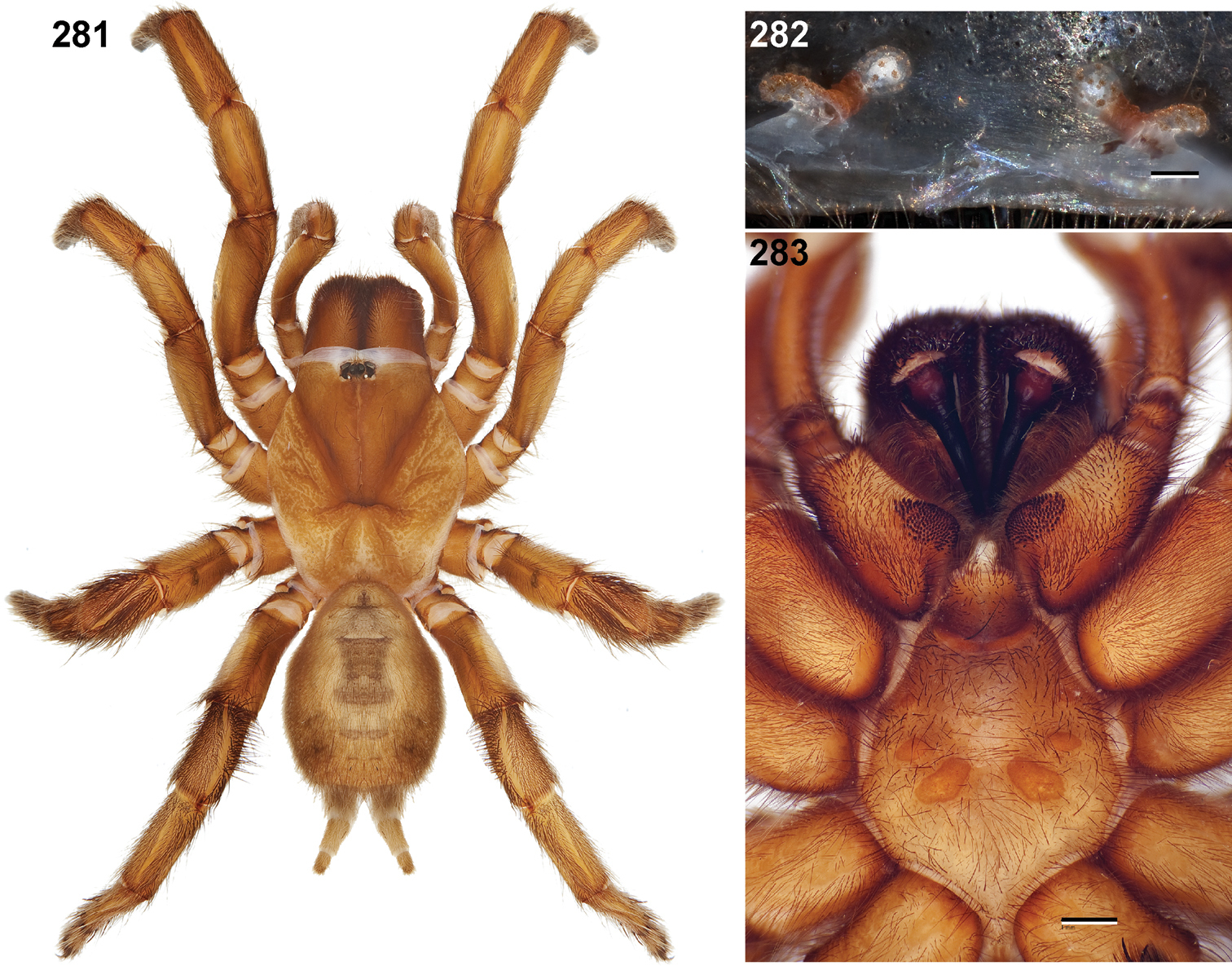
Female

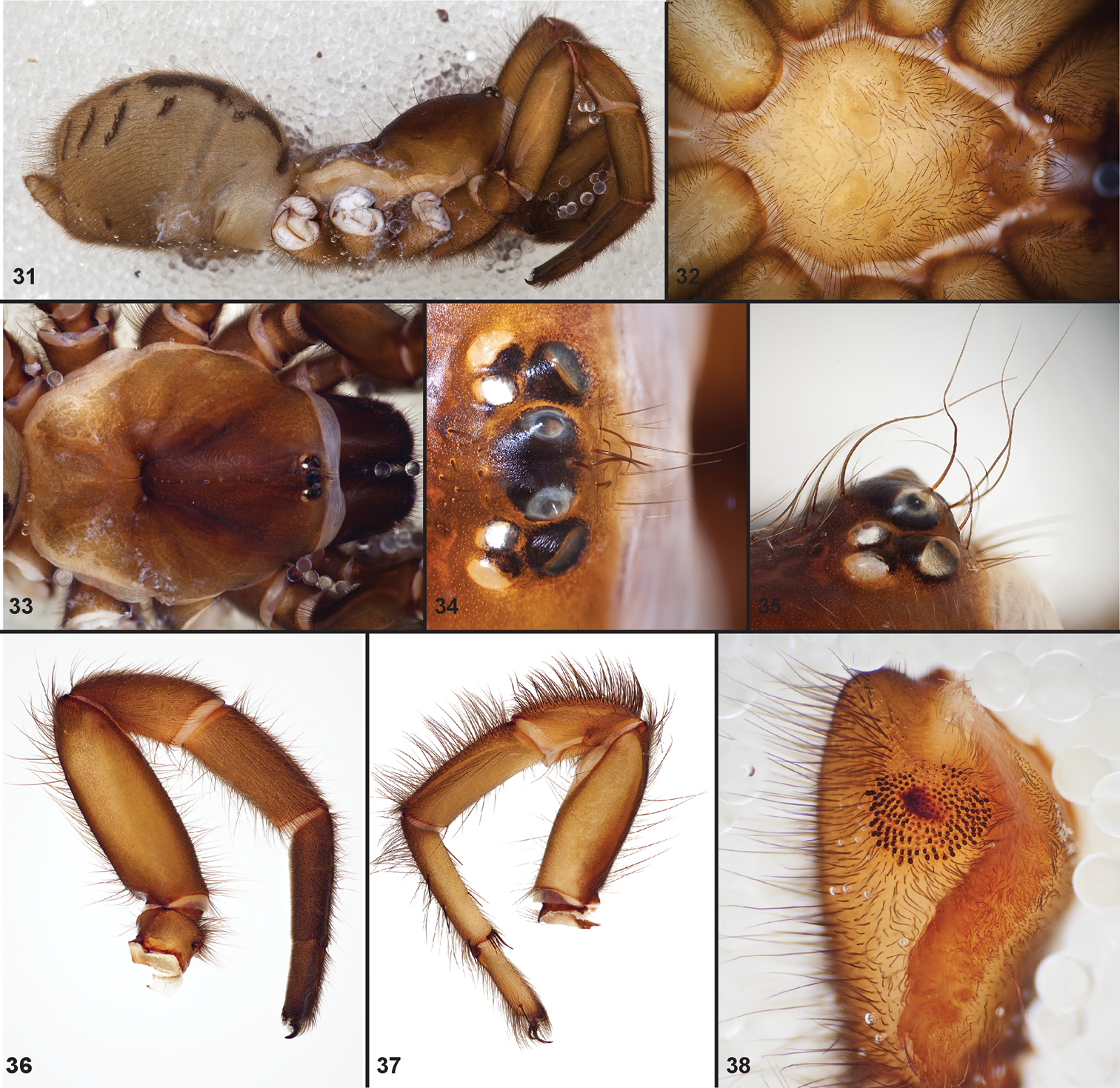
Aptostichus simus female anatomy from a standard light microscopy views of female an Aptostichus simus specimen (MY3432). 31 side view 32 ventral view, sternum 33 dorsal view, carapace 34–35 eye group, dorsal and lateral views 36 leg I prolateral view 37 leg IV retrolateral view 38 palpal endite

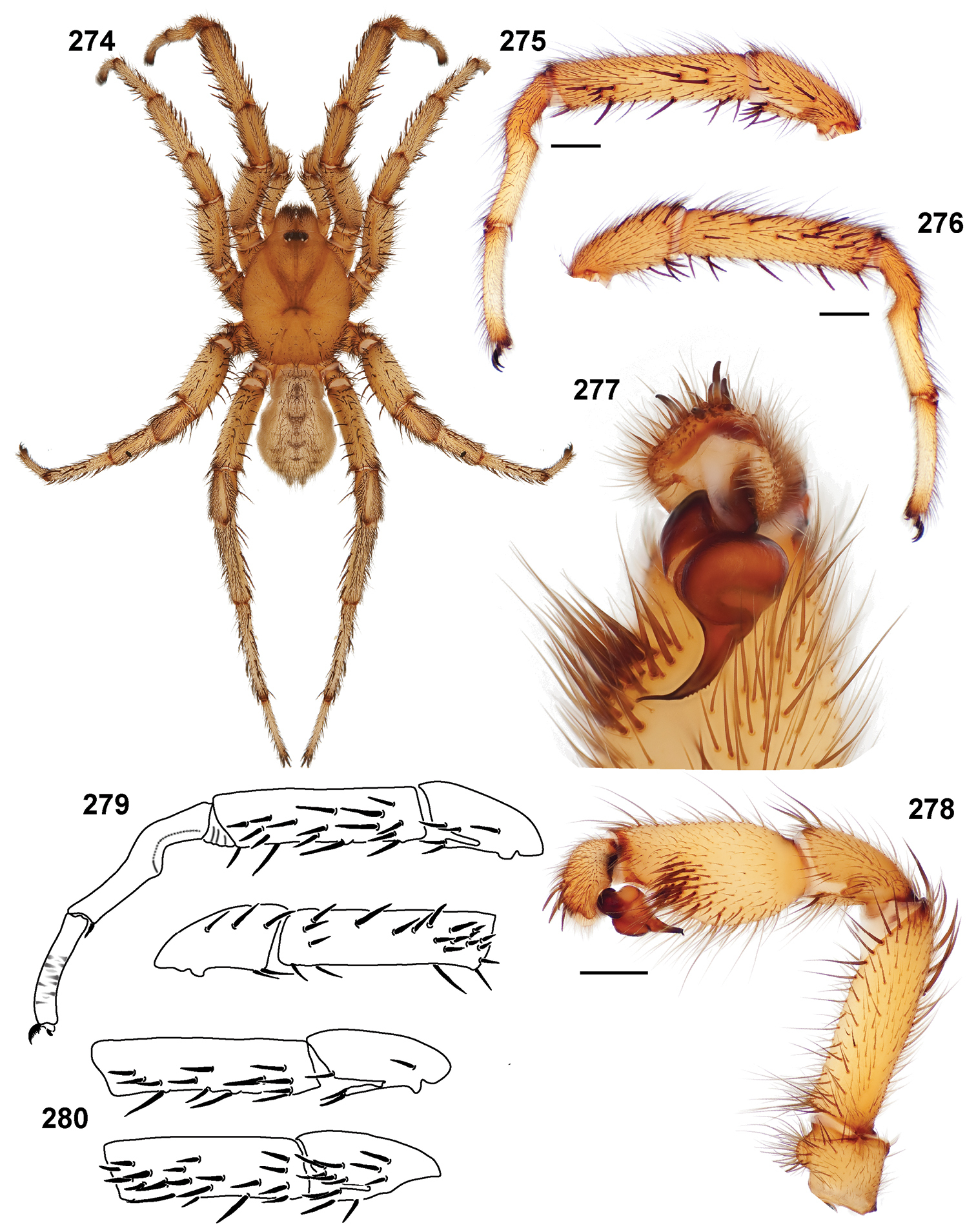
Aptostichus simus male anatomy from Chamberlin, 1917 male specimens from San Diego County; scale bars = 1.0mm. 274 habitus (AP1209) 275–278 secondary sexual characteristics (AP819) 275 retrolateral aspect, leg I 276 prolateral aspect, leg I 277 ventral view, pedipalp bulb 278 retrolateral aspect, pedipalp 279, 280 line drawings, leg I articles 279 retrolateral and prolateral aspect of specimen from San Diego County, Imperial Beach 280 retrolateral aspect, tibia and patella, in descending from San Diego County, Imperial Beach and Santa Barbara County, Carpinteria State Beach

Aptostichus simus is a species of trapdoor spider in the family Euctenizidae. It is a medium-sized mygalomorph found in the United States and Mexico. Aptostichus simus build deep burrows within the sand dunes of California and Mexico near coastal vegetation. These burrows are lined with pure silk and secured with most camouflaged trapdoor made out of sand and silk.
