= Aptostichus aguacaliente =

Scientific classification
- Kingdom: Animalia
- Phylum: Arthropoda
- Subphylum: Chelicerata
- Class: Arachnida
- Order: Araneae
- Infraorder: Mygalomorphae
- Family: Euctenizidae
- Genus: Aptostichus
- Species: A. aguacaliente

Binomial name
- Aptostichus aguacaliente Bond, 2012

Species of spider

Aptostichus aguacaliente is a species of mygalomorph spider found in California.

== Description ==
Aptostichus aguacaliente can be distinguished from similar species by the arrangement of spines on the first tibia and the structure of the metatarsal mating apophysis. The retrolateral distal area of tibia I bears three to five spines, which often overlap. The metatarsal mating apophysis carries a single small spine and is triangular in shape. Females can be distinguished from males by a median spermathecal stalk that is sinuous and 8-9 times longer than wide.

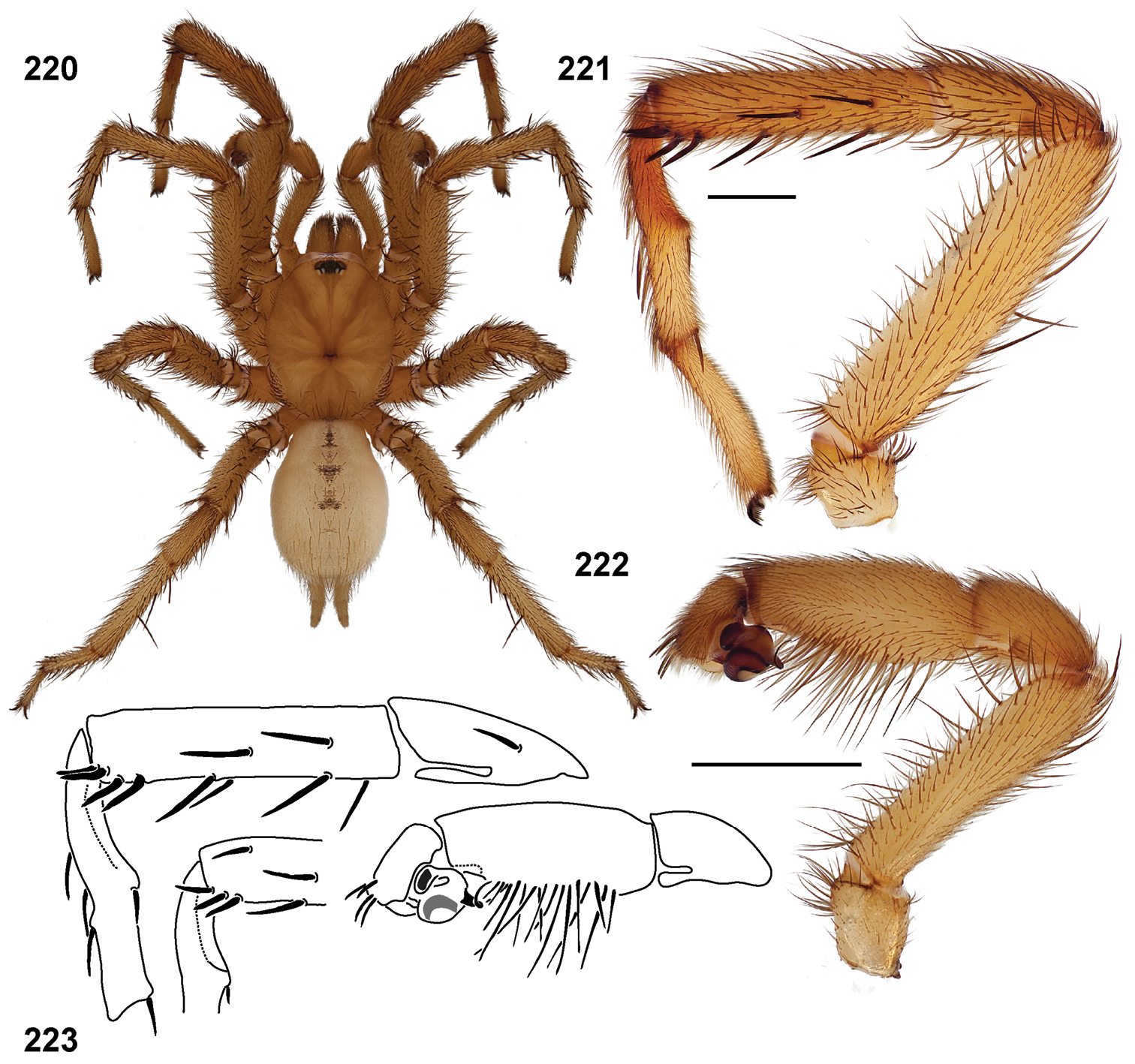
Anatomy of male A. aguacaliente

Aptostichus aguacaliente spiders are pale-to-yellowish brown in color with dark mid dorsal band markings.

== Range ==
Aptostichus aguacaliente spiders are found primarily throughout the Colorado Desert. It is likely that the species was found more widely throughout and to the north of the Imperial Valley before extensive agricultural development reduced their range.

== Ecology ==
Male A. aguacaliente can be found wandering in the late winter and early spring. Females create burrows that can be found during the winter months, particularly after heavy rains, by a small mound of soil left at the burrow entrance.

== Etymology ==
The species name "aguacaliente" is taken from the Agua Caliente Band of the Cahuilla Native American Tribal group of Palm Springs, California.
