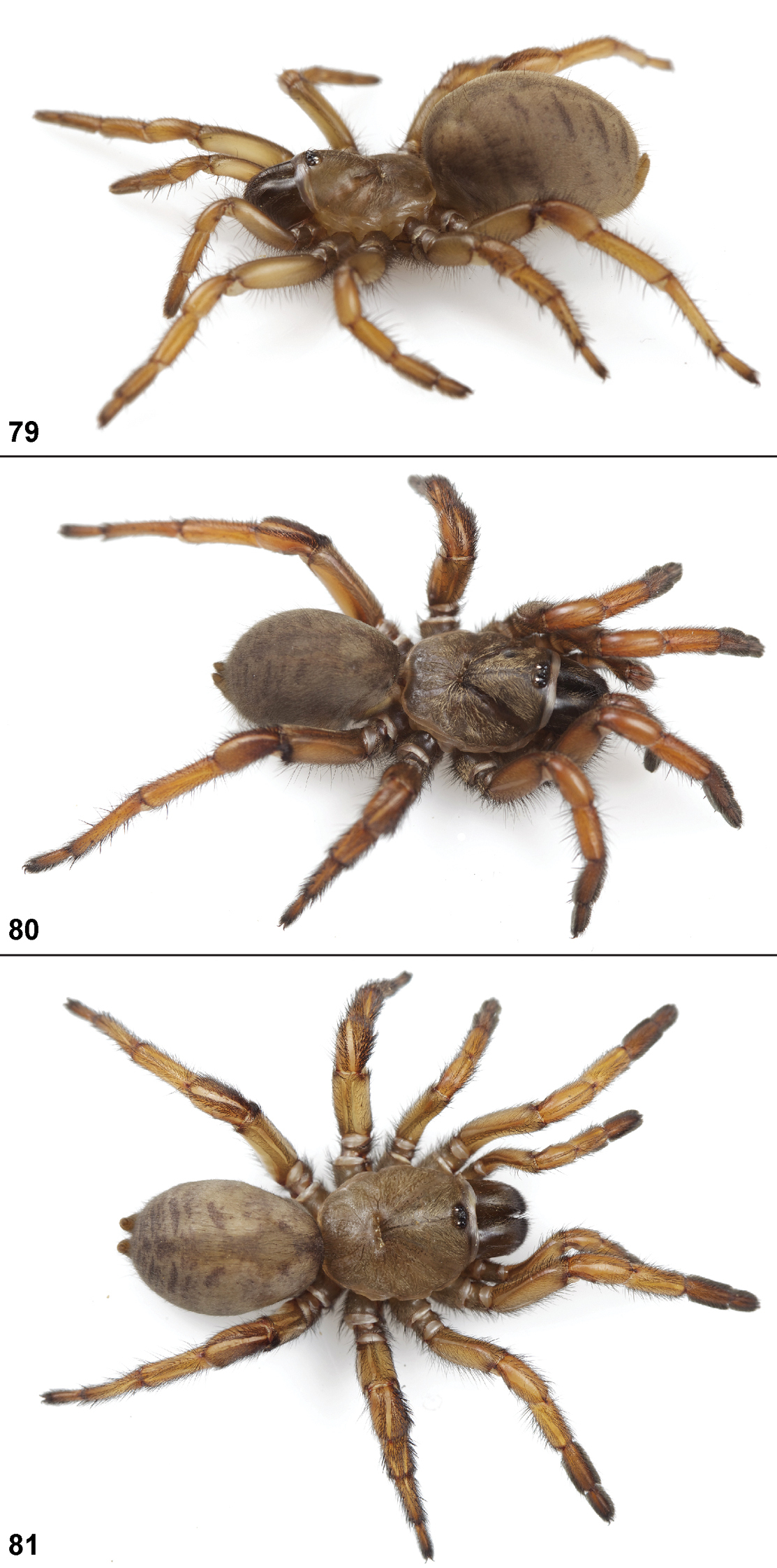

Scientific classification
- Kingdom: Animalia
- Phylum: Arthropoda
- Subphylum: Chelicerata
- Class: Arachnida
- Order: Araneae
- Infraorder: Mygalomorphae
- Family: Euctenizidae
- Genus: Aptostichus
- Species: A. atomarius

Binomial name
- Aptostichus atomarius Simon, 1891

= Aptostichus atomarius =

Species of spider

Aptostichus atomarius, the San Bernardino hills trapdoor spider, is a species of wafer-lid trapdoor spider in the family Euctenizidae. It is found in the United States.
