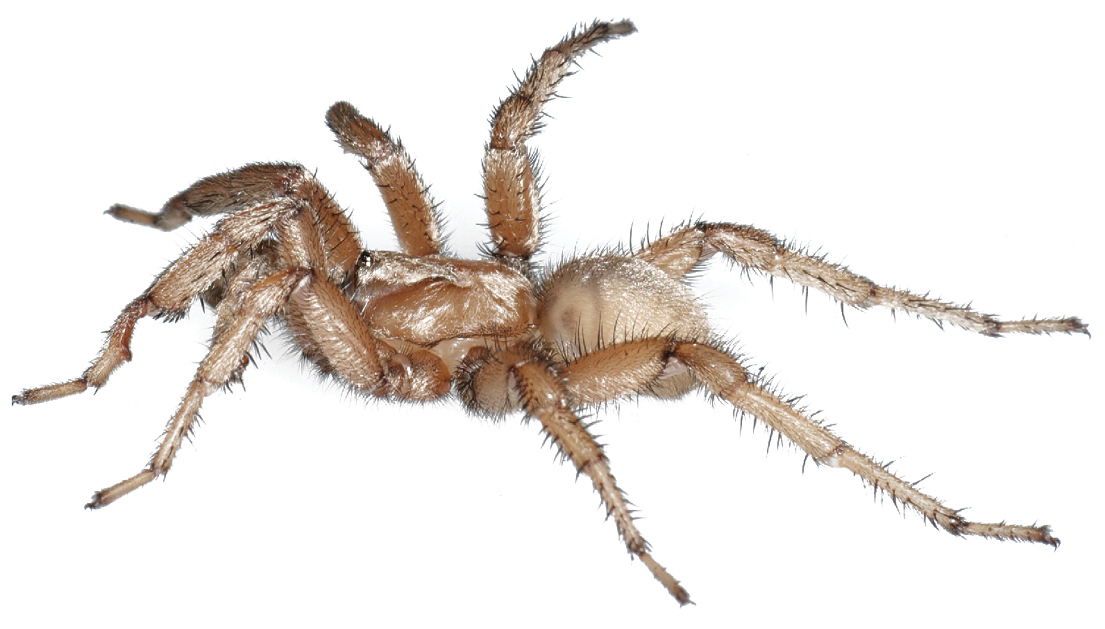
- Male specimen (holotype)
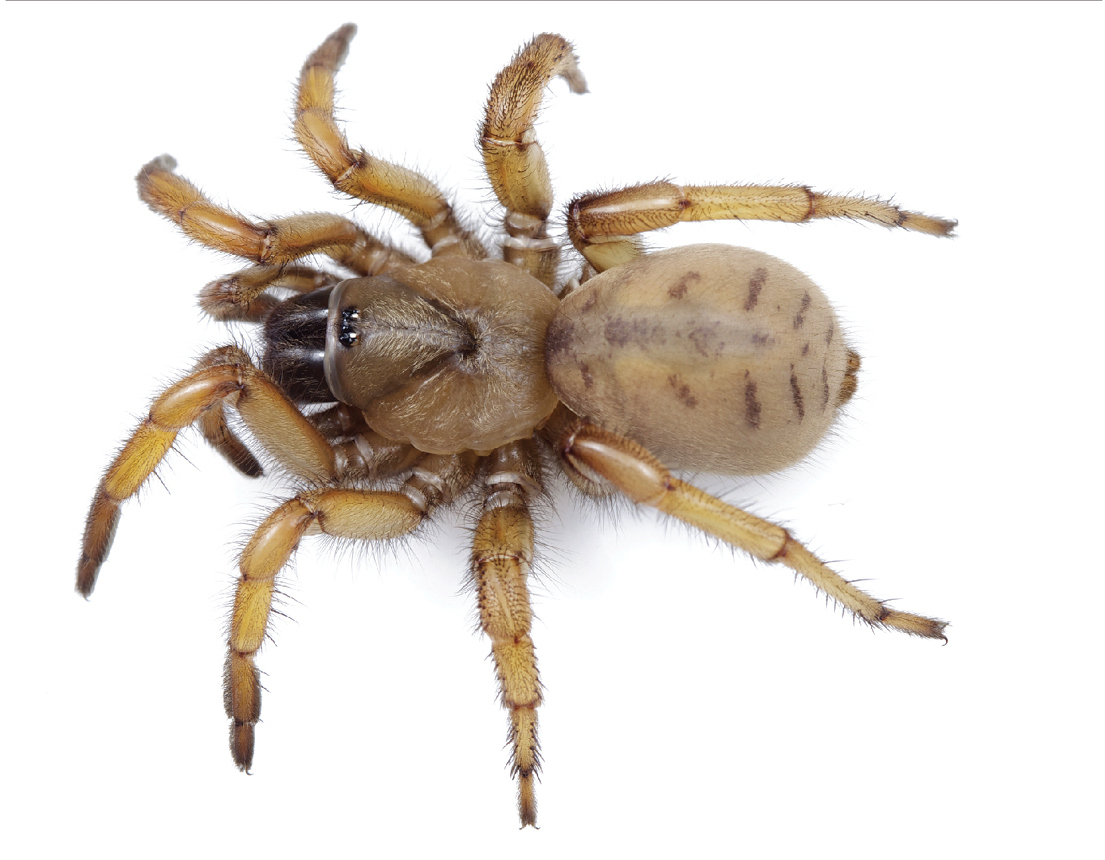
- Female specimen

Scientific classification
- Kingdom: Animalia
- Phylum: Arthropoda
- Subphylum: Chelicerata
- Class: Arachnida
- Order: Araneae
- Infraorder: Mygalomorphae
- Family: Euctenizidae
- Genus: Aptostichus
- Species: A. stephencolberti

Binomial name
- Aptostichus stephencolberti Bond, 2008

= Aptostichus stephencolberti =

Species of arachnid

Aptostichus stephencolberti is a species of spider in the family Euctenizidae, named after the American satirist Stephen Colbert. The spider was discovered on the California coastline in 2007.

== Description ==
Aptostichus stephencolberti is found on coastal dunes that extend from the Big Sur area to the San Francisco Peninsula at Point Lobos and Golden Gate. Compared to closely related species such as Aptostichus angelinajolieae (named after Angelina Jolie), Aptostichus stephencolberti is lighter in color. The male holotype and the female paratype both have brownish yellow legs, carapace and chelicerae, while the abdomen is lighter with dusky stripes. The male has six teeth, while the female has five.

== Naming ==
The spider was named after Colbert after he reported on his television series The Colbert Report that Jason Bond, a professor of biology at East Carolina University, named a different species of spider Myrmekiaphila neilyoungi, after the Canadian rock star Neil Young. Colbert was angered by the fact that Bond had not named a spider after him, and began to appeal for a species of animal to be named after him. He claimed that he already had an eagle and a turtle named after him (although not taxonomically), so there was no reason that another animal could not be named after him as well.

On a later edition of The Colbert Report, Colbert revealed that Bond would name a spider after him, with Colbert claiming, "And all I had to do was shamelessly beg on national television." The two men talked on the phone to decide which spider should be named after Colbert, but as there were 27 different species of spider available, Bond was left to make the final choice.

The name Aptostichus stephencolberti was officially announced as the spider named after Colbert on The Colbert Report on August 6, 2008. Because Colbert pronounces his surname with a silent "T", the last "T" in stephencolberti is also silent.

== See also ==
- List of organisms named after famous people (born 1950–1974)
