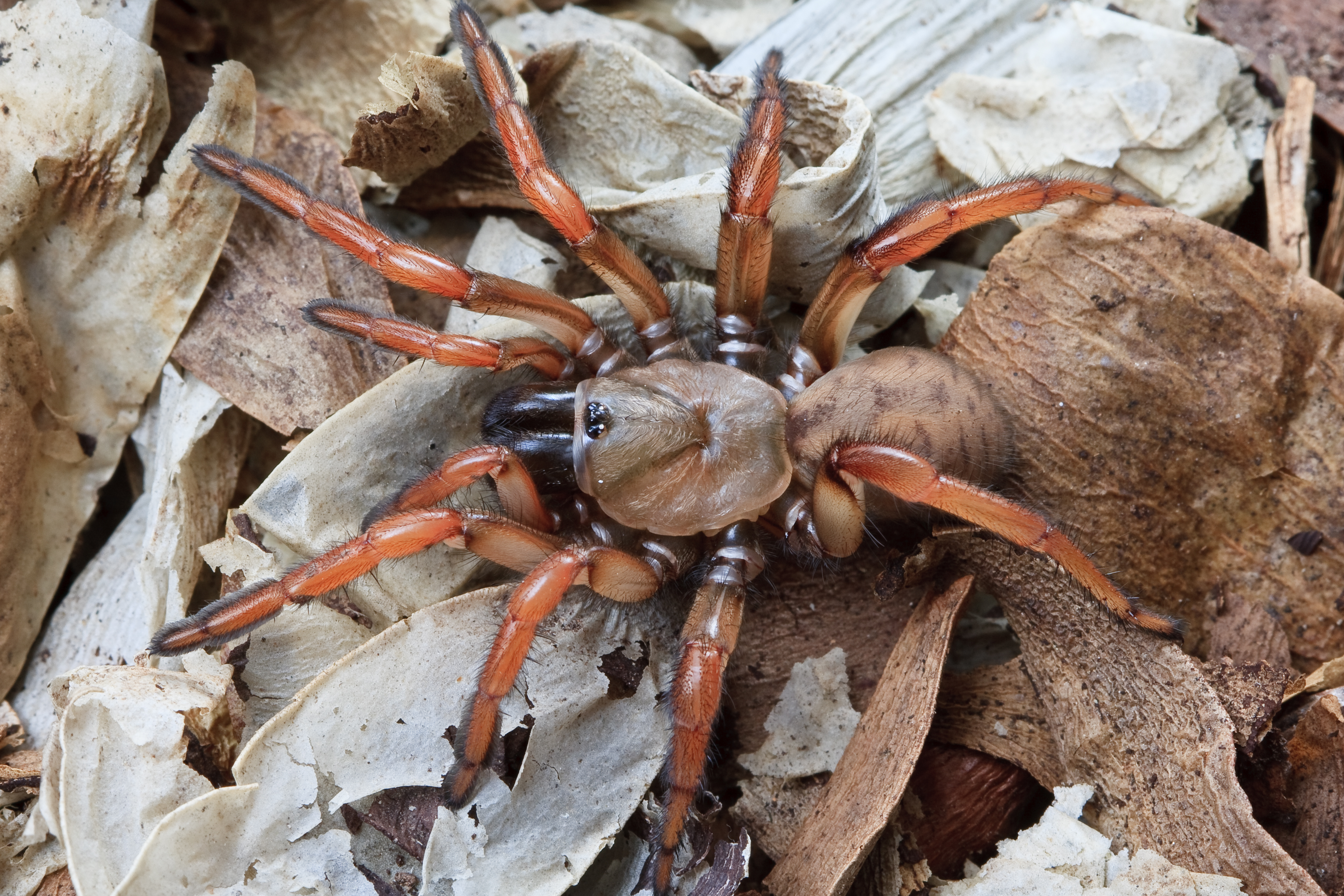
- Aptostichus sp.

Scientific classification
- Kingdom: Animalia
- Phylum: Arthropoda
- Subphylum: Chelicerata
- Class: Arachnida
- Order: Araneae
- Infraorder: Mygalomorphae
- Family: Euctenizidae
- Genus: Aptostichus; Simon, 1891

Type species
- A. atomarius Simon, 1891

Species
- 41, see text

Synonyms
- Actinoxia Simon, 1891; Nemesoides Chamberlin, 1919

= Aptostichus =

Genus of spiders

Aptostichus is a genus of North American mygalomorph spiders in the family Euctenizidae, and was first described by Eugène Simon in 1891. They are found predominantly in southern California, United States.

== Behavior ==
Members of the North American genus, Aptostichus, assemble tunnels with side chambers, but they do not close these chambers with additional trapdoors.

== Species ==
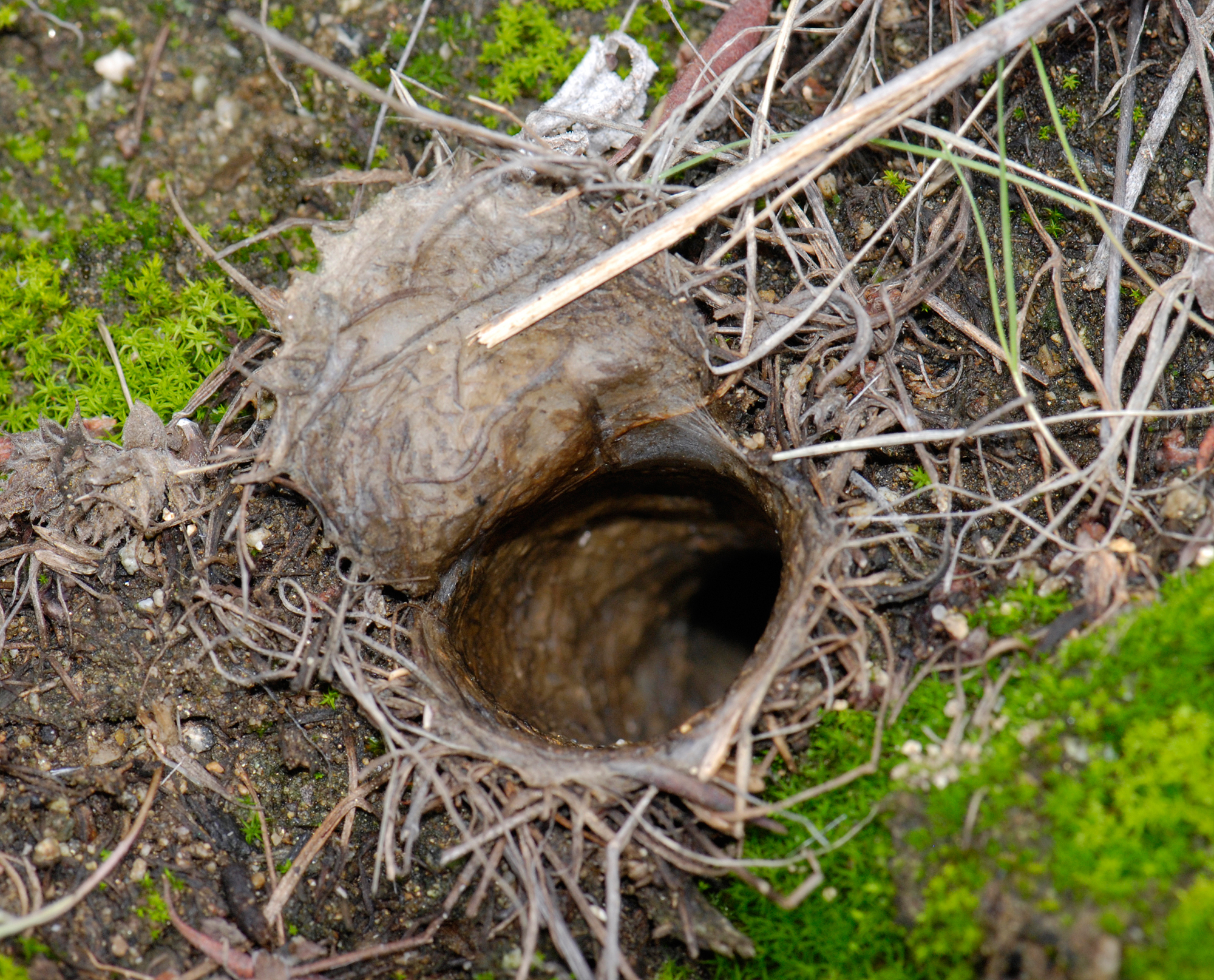
Trapdoor of an Aptostichus burrow

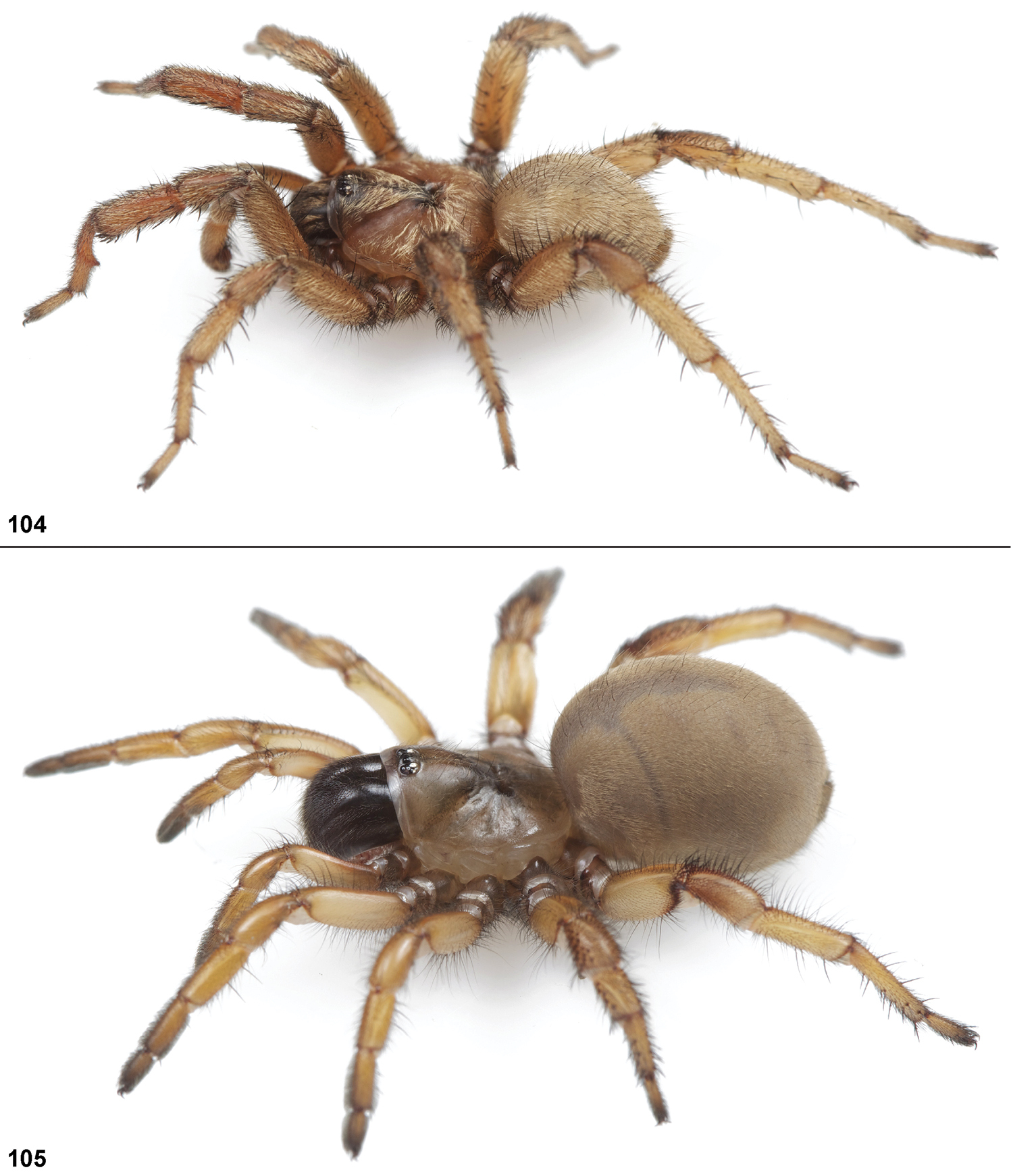
Aptostichus miwok male (top) and female

As of May 2019 it contains forty-one species in the United States and Mexico:

- Aptostichus aguacaliente Bond, 2012 – USA
- Aptostichus angelinajolieae Bond, 2008 – USA
- Aptostichus anzaborrego Bond, 2012 – USA
- Aptostichus asmodaeus Bond, 2012 – USA
- Aptostichus atomarius Simon, 1891 (type) – USA
- Aptostichus barackobamai Bond, 2012 – USA
- Aptostichus bonoi Bond, 2012 – USA
- Aptostichus cabrillo Bond, 2012 – USA, Mexico
- Aptostichus cahuilla Bond, 2012 – USA
- Aptostichus cajalco Bond, 2012 – USA
- Aptostichus chavezi Bond, 2012 – USA
- Aptostichus chemehuevi Bond, 2012 – USA
- Aptostichus chiricahua Bond, 2012 – USA
- Aptostichus dantrippi Bond, 2012 – USA
- Aptostichus derhamgiulianii Bond, 2012 – USA
- Aptostichus dorothealangeae Bond, 2012 – USA
- Aptostichus edwardabbeyi Bond, 2012 – USA
- Aptostichus elisabethae Bond, 2012 – USA
- Aptostichus fisheri Bond, 2012 – USA
- Aptostichus fornax Bond, 2012 – USA
- Aptostichus hedinorum Bond, 2012 – USA
- Aptostichus hesperus (Chamberlin, 1919) – USA
- Aptostichus huntington Bond, 2012 – USA
- Aptostichus icenoglei Bond, 2012 – USA, Mexico
- Aptostichus isabella Bond, 2012 – USA
- Aptostichus killerdana Bond, 2012 – USA
- Aptostichus lucerne Bond, 2012 – USA
- Aptostichus mikeradtkei Bond, 2012 – USA
- Aptostichus miwok Bond, 2008 – USA
- Aptostichus muiri Bond, 2012 – USA
- Aptostichus nateevansi Bond, 2012 – USA
- Aptostichus pennjillettei Bond, 2012 – USA
- Aptostichus sabinae Valdez-Mondragón & Cortez-Roldán, 2016 – Mexico
- Aptostichus sarlacc Bond, 2012 – USA
- Aptostichus satleri Bond, 2012 – USA
- Aptostichus serrano Bond, 2012 – USA
- Aptostichus sierra Bond, 2012 – USA
- Aptostichus simus Chamberlin, 1917 – USA, Mexico
- Aptostichus sinnombre Bond, 2012 – USA
- Aptostichus stanfordianus Smith, 1908 – USA
- Aptostichus stephencolberti Bond, 2008 – USA

== See also ==
- Myrmekiaphila
