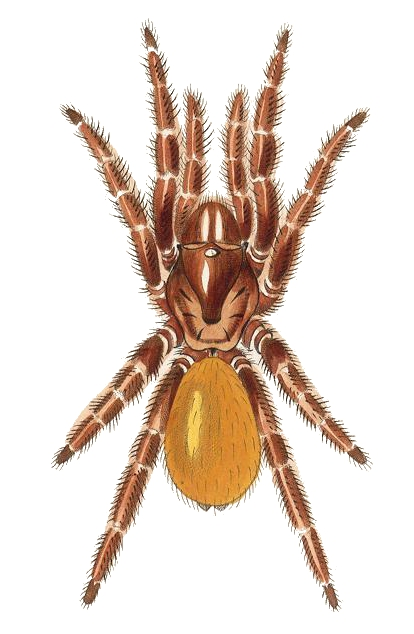
- Entychides aurantiacus

Scientific classification
- Kingdom: Animalia
- Phylum: Arthropoda
- Subphylum: Chelicerata
- Class: Arachnida
- Order: Araneae
- Infraorder: Mygalomorphae
- Family: Euctenizidae
- Genus: Entychides; Simon, 1888

Type species
- E. aurantiacus Simon, 1888

Species
- 4, see text

= Entychides =

Genus of spiders

Entychides is a genus of mygalomorph trapdoor spiders in the family Euctenizidae, and was first described by Eugène Simon in 1888. Originally placed with the Ctenizidae, it was moved to the wafer trapdoor spiders in 1985, then to the Euctenizidae in 2012.

== Species ==
As of May 2019 it contains four species in Mexico, the Southwestern United States, and the Lesser Antilles:

- Entychides arizonicus Gertsch & Wallace, 1936 – USA
- Entychides aurantiacus Simon, 1888 (type) – Mexico
- Entychides dugesi Simon, 1888 – Mexico
- Entychides guadalupensis Simon, 1888 – Guadeloupe
