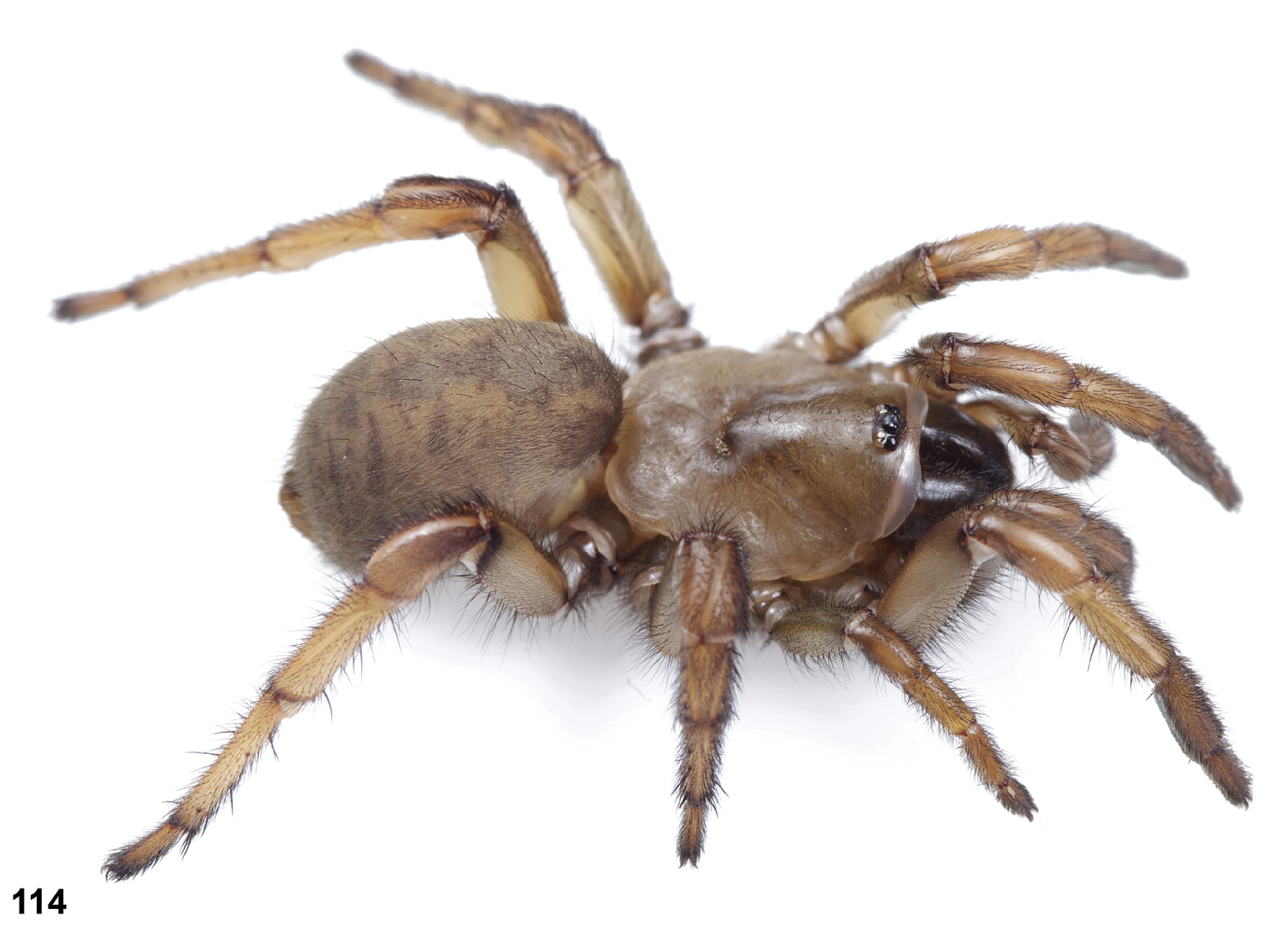
- Female

Scientific classification
- Kingdom: Animalia
- Phylum: Arthropoda
- Subphylum: Chelicerata
- Class: Arachnida
- Order: Araneae
- Infraorder: Mygalomorphae
- Family: Euctenizidae
- Genus: Aptostichus
- Species: A. stanfordianus

Binomial name
- Aptostichus stanfordianus Smith, 1908

= Aptostichus stanfordianus =

Species of spider

Aptostichus stanfordianus, the Stanford Hills trapdoor spider, is a species of wafer-lid trapdoor spider (Euctenizidae) endemic to California in the United States.

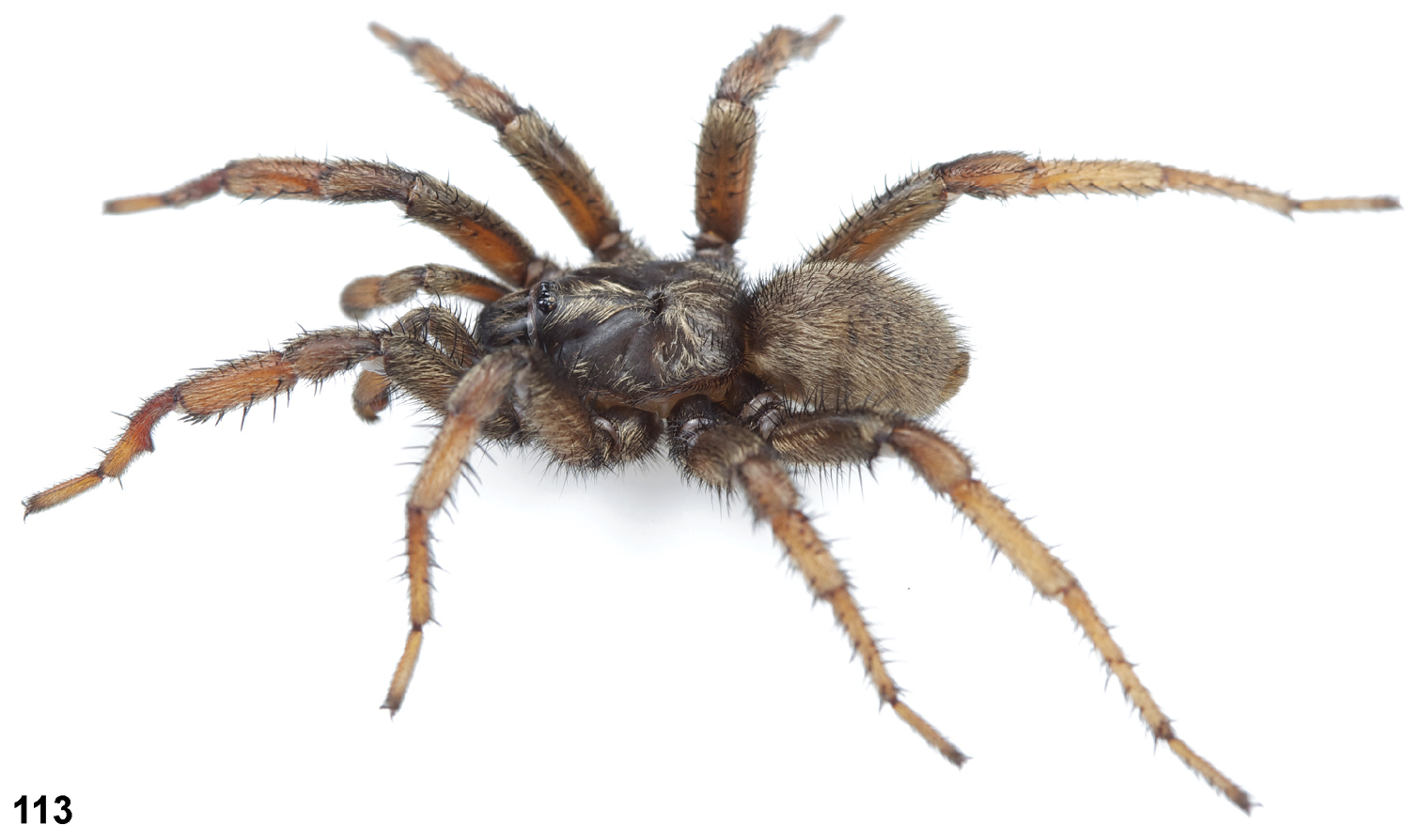
In Sonoma County, California
