= Myrmekiaphila neilyoungi =

Conservation status
- Least Concern (IUCN 3.1)

Scientific classification
- Kingdom: Animalia
- Phylum: Arthropoda
- Subphylum: Chelicerata
- Class: Arachnida
- Order: Araneae
- Infraorder: Mygalomorphae
- Family: Euctenizidae
- Genus: Myrmekiaphila
- Species: M. neilyoungi

Binomial name
- Myrmekiaphila neilyoungi Bond & Platnick, 2007
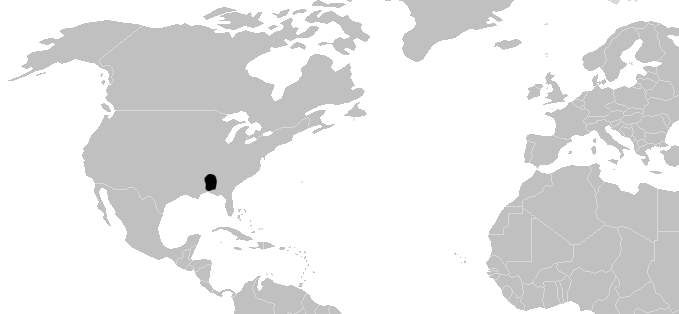

Species of spider

Myrmekiaphila neilyoungi is a species of spider in the family Euctenizidae, described in 2007 by East Carolina University professor of biology Jason E. Bond and Norman I. Platnick, curator at the American Museum of Natural History in New York City. It is named after Canadian rock musician Neil Young.

Bond & Platnick described the male holotype and female paratype, which were collected in Jefferson County, Alabama, in 1998. While specimens have been collected repeatedly since 1940, it was only in 2007 that they were recognized as a new species. He co-wrote a paper revising the genus with Norman I. Platnick, describing this and several other new species.

M. neilyoungi is widely distributed throughout Alabama, with one known locality from northwestern Florida.

Bond received $750,000 in grants from the National Science Foundation in 2005 and 2006 to classify the species of the family Cyrtaucheniidae and contribute to the foundation's Tree of Life project.

Bond opted to name the spider after his favorite musician, Neil Young, whose music and activism on peace and justice he appreciates.
