= Scopulae =

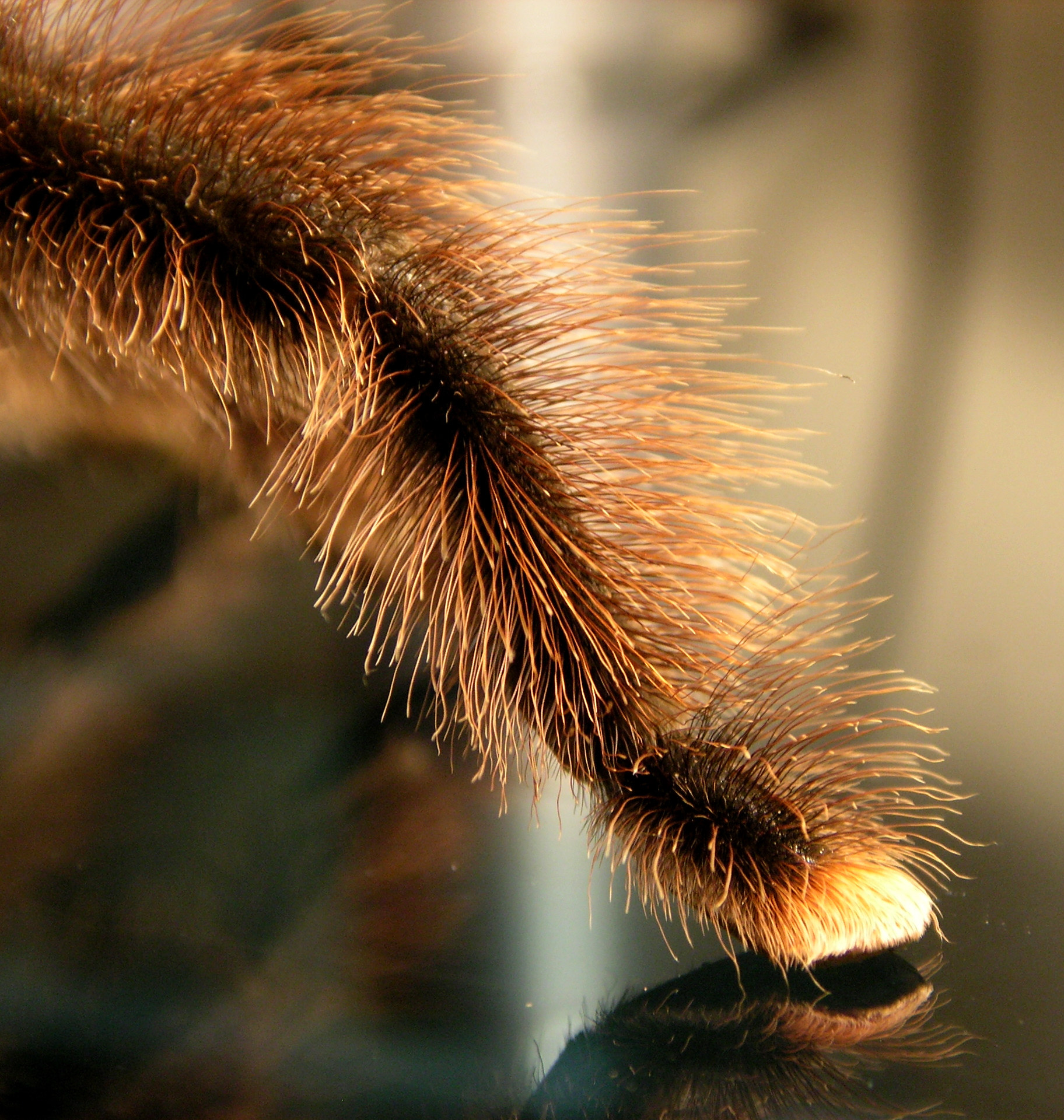
Avicularia avicularia leg

Scopulae, or scopula pads, are dense tufts of hair at the end of a spider's legs. They are found mostly on hunting spiders, for example Salticidae and Sparassidae. Scopulae consist of microscopic hairs, known as setae, which are each covered in even smaller hairs called setules or "end feet", resulting in a large contact area.

When the scopulae are splayed out and placed against a surface, remarkable adhesion is produced due to the accumulation of adhesion of each individual setule interacting with a substrate. The adhesion may be due to the excretion of liquid from adhesive pads, although setae can adhere in both dry and wet modes. This enables spiders with scopulae to climb even sheer, smooth surfaces such as glass. The adhesion is so great that the spider could grip using this force and support 170 times its own weight. Possible physical mechanisms may include capillary, electrostatic, viscous, or Van der Waals force. (Niederegger et al 2002; Betz and Kölsch, 2004)

Scopulae have been used in taxonomy to identify families, especially Mygalomorphae. Scopulae are found in addition to, not instead of, the claws at the end of each appendage, called tarsal claws.
