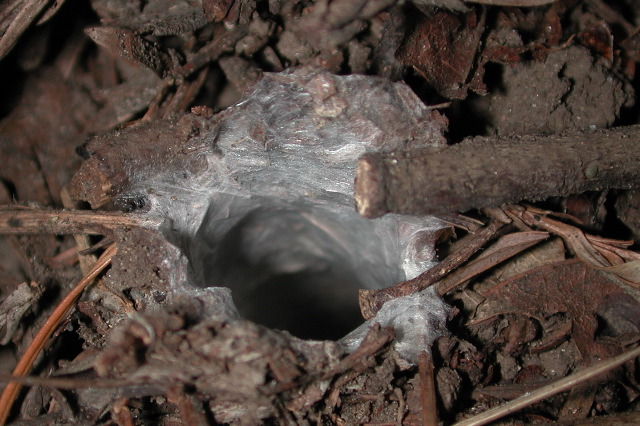
- Promyrmekiaphila sp. trap door

Scientific classification
- Kingdom: Animalia
- Phylum: Arthropoda
- Subphylum: Chelicerata
- Class: Arachnida
- Order: Araneae
- Infraorder: Mygalomorphae
- Family: Euctenizidae
- Genus: Promyrmekiaphila; Schenkel-Haas, 1950

Type species
- Promyrmekiaphila clathrata (Simon, 1891)

= Promyrmekiaphila =

Genus of spiders

Promyrmekiaphila is a genus of North American mygalomorph spiders in the family Euctenizidae. The genus was first described by E. Schenkel-Haas in 1950. As of May 2019 it contains only two species, both found in the United States: Promyrmekiaphila clathrata and Promyrmekiaphila winnemem.
