= Jason Bond =

American biologist

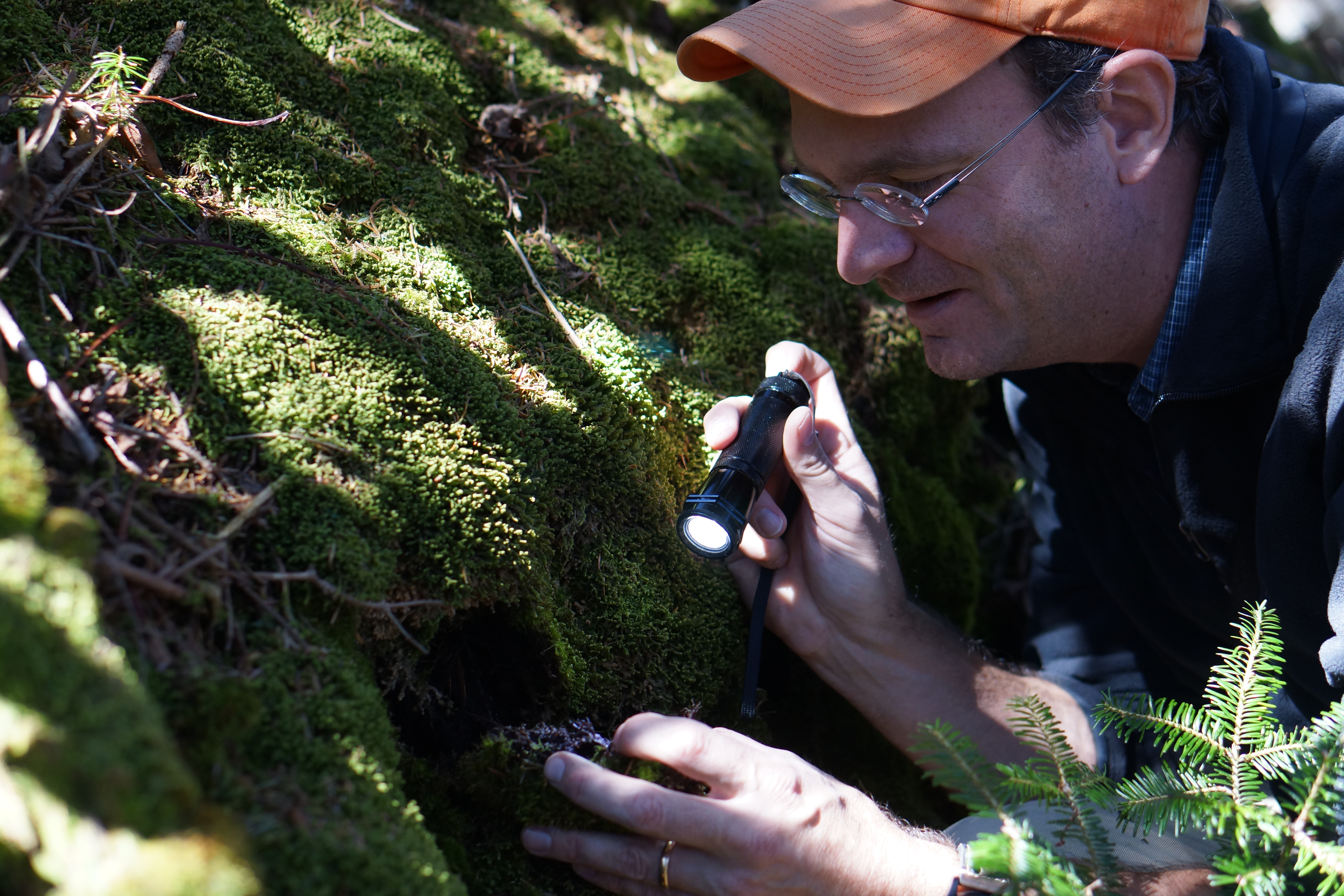
- Bond in 2012

Academic background
- Education: Western Carolina University (BS); Virginia Tech (MS, PhD)

Academic work
- Discipline: Biology
- Sub-discipline: Arachnology; Myriapodology
- Institutions: Auburn University; East Carolina University; University of California, Davis

Jason E. Bond is an American biologist working as a Professor of Entomology and the Schlinger Chair in Insect Systematics at the University of California, Davis.

== Education ==
Bond attended Western Carolina University, earning a Bachelor of Science degree in biology in 1993. He earned a Master of Science in biology (1995) and Ph.D. in evolutionary systematics and genetics (1999) from Virginia Tech.

== Career ==
Bond was a Professor of Biology, Chair of the Department of Biological Sciences and Director of the Auburn University Museum of Natural History at Auburn University. When he was an associate professor with the Department of Biology at East Carolina University, he discovered the spider Myrmekiaphila neilyoungi and numerous other species in the genus Aptostichus.

On August 6, 2008, Bond appeared on The Colbert Report, where he named the spider Aptostichus stephencolberti after host Stephen Colbert.
