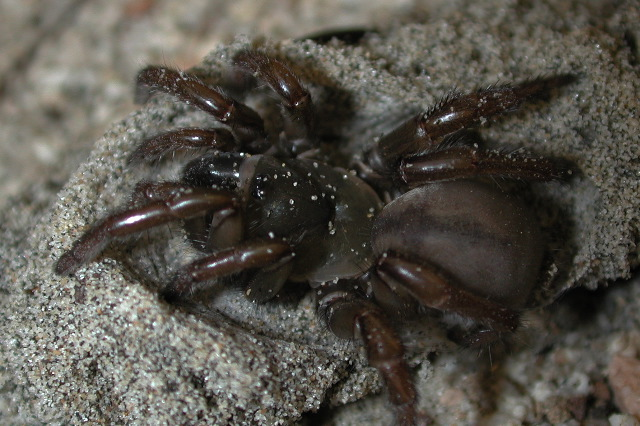
- Aptostichus sp.

Scientific classification
- Kingdom: Animalia
- Phylum: Arthropoda
- Subphylum: Chelicerata
- Class: Arachnida
- Order: Araneae
- Infraorder: Mygalomorphae
- Clade: Avicularioidea
- Family: Euctenizidae; Raven, 1985

Diversity
- 8 genera, 79 species
- blue: reported countries (WSC) green: observation hotspots (iNaturalist)

= Euctenizidae =

Family of spiders

The Euctenizidae are a family of mygalomorph spiders. Originally created as a subfamily of Cyrtaucheniidae by Robert Raven in 1985, it was established as a family by Bond et al. in 2012.

They are now considered to be more closely related to Idiopidae.

== Biology ==
Many, but not all, make wafer-like doors to their burrows, while others build the cork-like doors found commonly in the true trapdoor spiders. The biology of nearly all of the species is poorly known.

== Distribution ==
The family occurs almost exclusively in the United States and Mexico. Common U.S. genera include Myrmekiaphila, Aptostichus and Promyrmekiaphila.

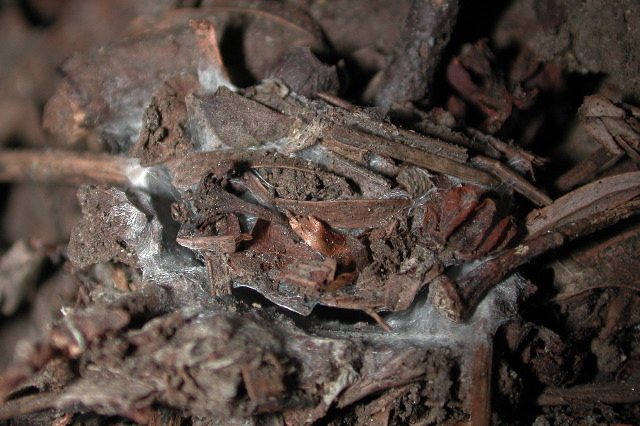
Promyrmekiaphila burrow entrance closed, ...

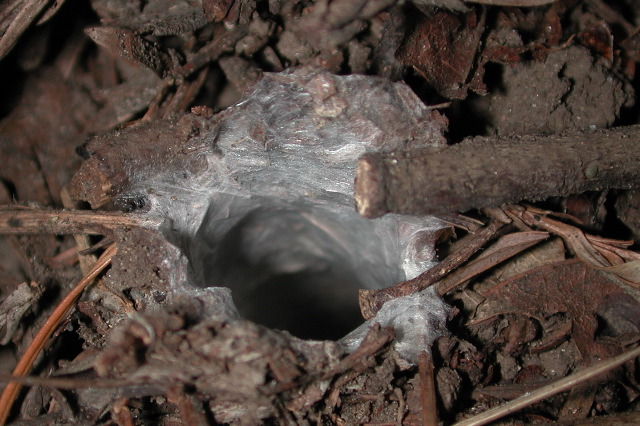
...and opened.

== Genera ==
As of January 2026, this family includes eight genera and 79 species:

- Apomastus Bond & Opell, 2002 – United States
- Aptostichus Simon, 1891 – Mexico, United States
- Cryptocteniza Bond & Hamilton, 2020 – United States
- Entychides Simon, 1888 – Guadeloupe, Mexico, United States
- Eucteniza Ausserer, 1875 – Mexico, United States
- Myrmekiaphila Atkinson, 1886 – United States
- Neoapachella Bond & Opell, 2002 – United States
- Promyrmekiaphila Schenkel, 1950 – United States

== See also ==
- Spider families
