= List of Paratropididae species =

This page lists all described species of the spider family Paratropididae accepted by the World Spider Catalog as of January 2021:

== Anisaspis ==
Anisaspis Simon, 1892 – doubtful name (nomen dubium)

- A. tuberculata Simon, 1892 (type) — St. Vincent

== Anisaspoides ==
Anisaspoides

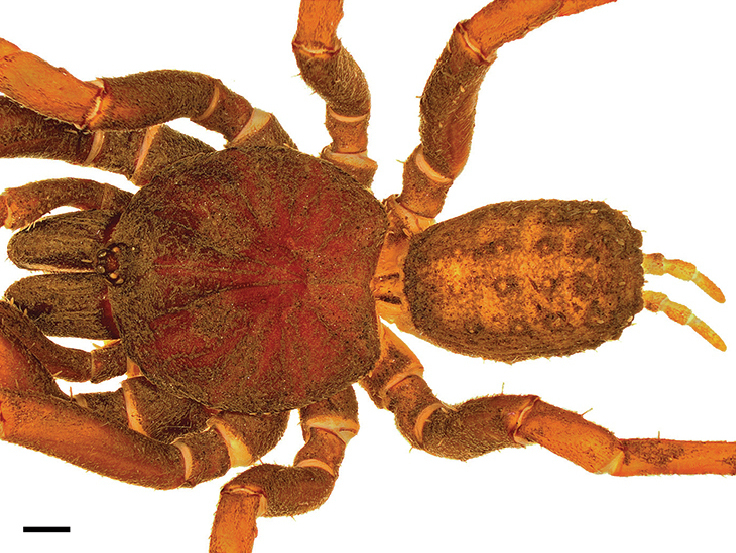
Anisaspoides camarita, male

Anisaspoides F. O. Pickard-Cambridge, 1896

- A. camarita (Perafán, Galvis & Pérez-Miles, 2019) — Colombia
- A. gigantea F. O. Pickard-Cambridge, 1896 (type) — Brazil

== Paratropis ==
Paratropis

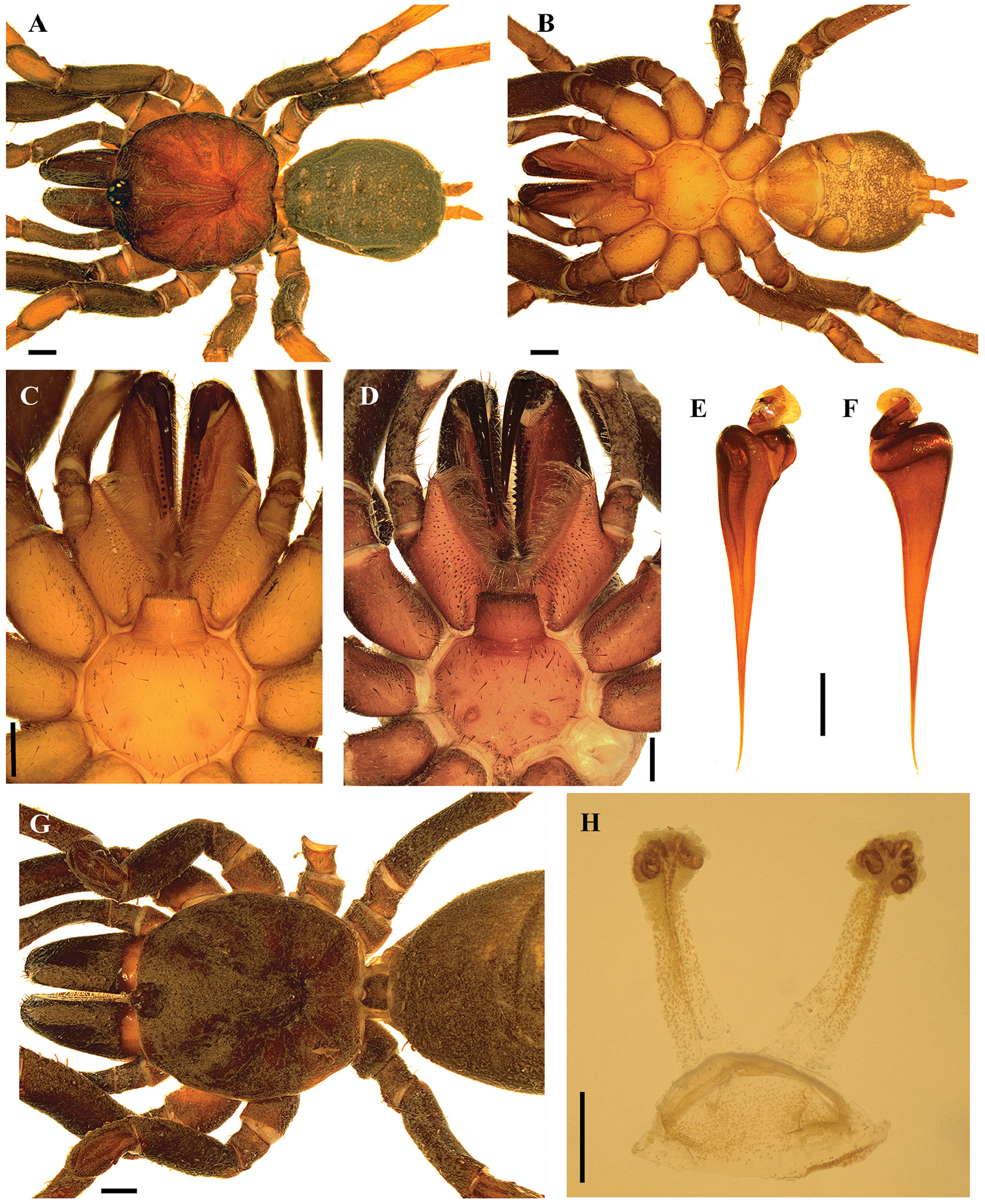
Paratropis elicioi

Paratropis Simon, 1889

- Paratropis elicioi Dupérré, 2015 — Ecuador
- Paratropis florezi Perafán, Galvis & Pérez-Miles, 2019 — Colombia
- Paratropis minuscula (Almeida & de Morais, 2022) — Guyana
- Paratropis otonga Dupérré & Tapia, 2020 — Ecuador
- Paratropis papilligera F. O. Pickard-Cambridge, 1896 — Colombia, Brazil
- Paratropis pristirana Dupérré & Tapia, 2020 — Ecuador
- Paratropis sanguinea Mello-Leitão, 1923 — Brazil
- Paratropis scruposa Simon, 1889 (type) — Peru
- Paratropis seminermis Caporiacco, 1955 — Venezuela
- Paratropis tuxtlensis Valdez-Mondragón, Mendoza & Francke, 2014 — Mexico

== Stormtropis ==
Stormtropis

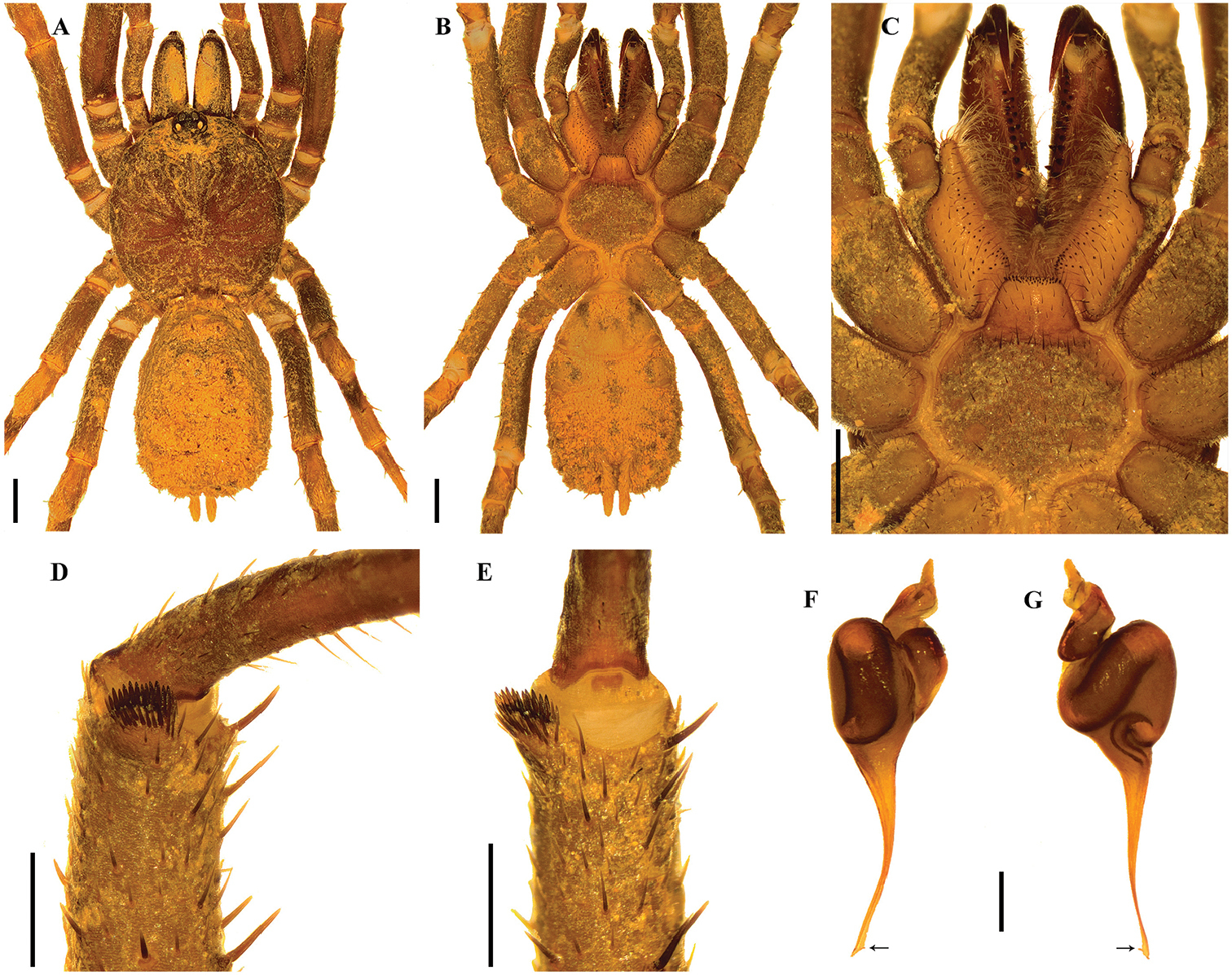
Stormtropis paisa, male

Stormtropis Perafán, Galvis & Pérez-Miles, 2019

- S. colima Perafán, Galvis & Pérez-Miles, 2019 — Colombia
- S. muisca Perafán, Galvis & Pérez-Miles, 2019 — Colombia
- S. paisa Perafán, Galvis & Pérez-Miles, 2019 — Colombia
- S. parvum Perafán, Galvis & Pérez-Miles, 2019 (type) — Colombia
