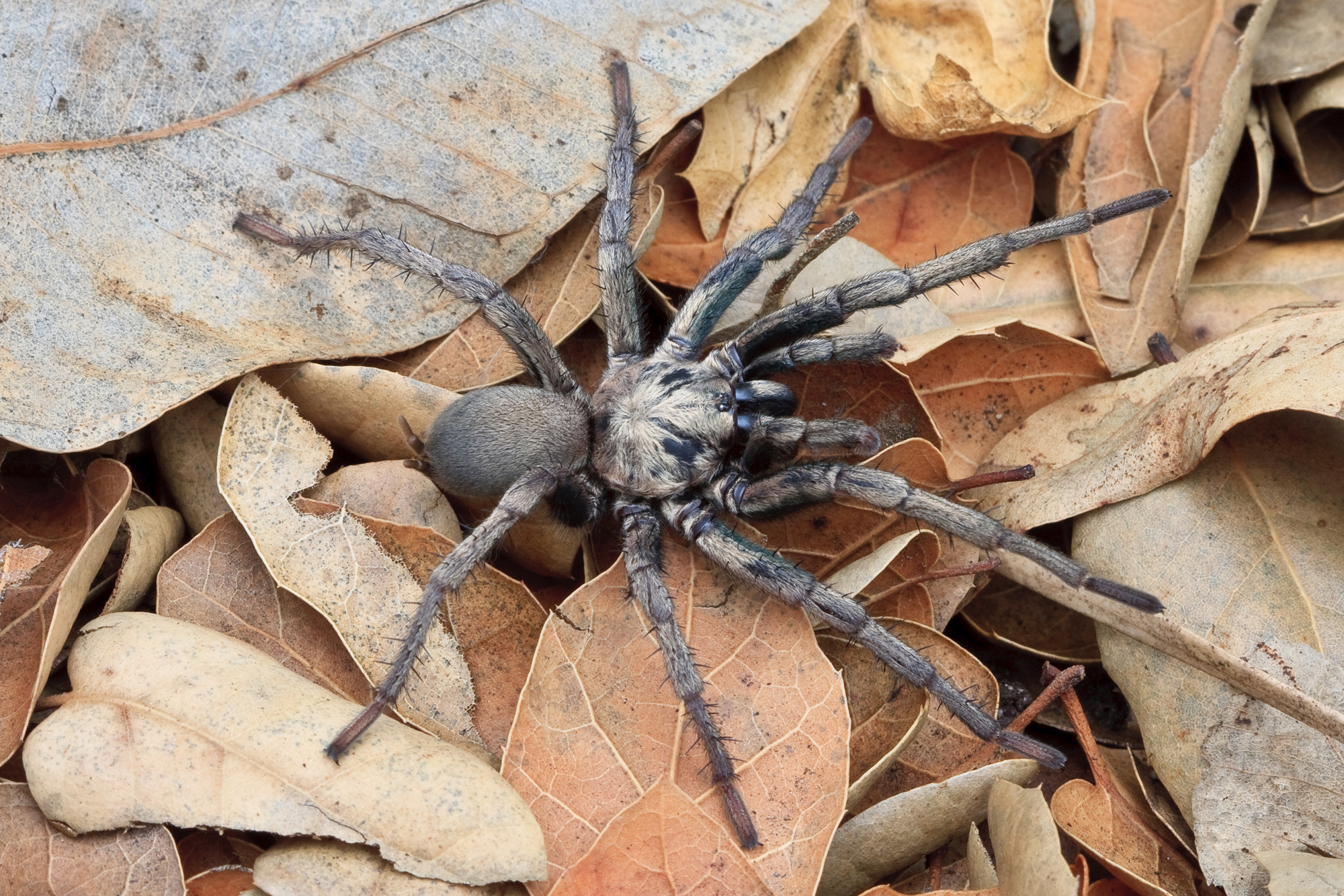
- Male Calisoga longitarsis, a member of the Nemesiidae

Scientific classification
- Kingdom: Animalia
- Phylum: Arthropoda
- Subphylum: Chelicerata
- Class: Arachnida
- Order: Araneae
- Infraorder: Mygalomorphae
- Clade: Bipectina
- Clade: Crassitarsae; Raven, 1985 (as a "hyperpicoorder")

Families
- See text.

= Crassitarsae =

Clade of spiders

Crassitarsae is a clade of avicularioid mygalomorph spiders first proposed by Robert J. Raven in 1985, based on a morphological cladistic analysis. Raven characterized the clade by a number of shared features, including the presence of some scopulae on the tarsi. The clade has been supported to some degree by subsequent molecular analyses, although with a somewhat different composition.

== Taxonomy ==
Crassitarsae was first proposed as a taxon by Robert J. Raven in 1985, based on a morphological cladistic analysis of Mygalomorphae. In Raven's analysis one shared character is the presence of some scopulae on the tarsi. (The Latin adjective crassus means 'thick', 'fat'.) The third claw is usually reduced in size, and the anterior lateral spinnerets are absent. Another morphological cladistic analysis, by Pablo Goloboff in 1993, supported the Crassitarsae, although with a slightly different circumscription. Goloboff's Crassitarsae was regarded as a viable taxonomic hypothesis in a 2006 molecular phylogenetic analysis, although not explicitly supported, and was recovered (again with a different circumscription) in a 2012 study of Mygalomorphae. The preferred hypothesis for the phylogenetic relationships of the Mygalomorphae in a 2020 study includes Crassitarsae.

=== Phylogeny ===
The preferred cladogram from a 2020 phylogenetic study of the Mygalomorphae is shown below. In this cladogram, Crassitarsae is resolved as the largest derived clade in the Bipectina. Some nodes within Bipectina had lower support (marked ♦ below), and in one of the individual analyses in the 2020 study, the Theraphosoidina clade was instead resolved as sister to the Stasimopidae/Venom Clade/Domiothelina clade, making the Crassitarsae paraphyletic. Another analysis recovered Paratropis within Crassitarsae.

- Avicularioidea
  - Basal families (6)
  - Bipectina
    - Paratropididae
    - - ♦
        - ♦
          - Stasimopidae
          - Venom Clade
            - Atracidae
            - Actinopodidae
        - Domiothelina (5 families)
      - Crassitarsae
        - Theraphosoidina
          - Bemmeridae
          - - Barychelidae
            - Theraphosidae
        - "Nemesioidina"
          - Nemesiidae
          - - Pycnothelidae
            - - - Dipluridae
                - Cyrtaucheniidae
              - - Anamidae
                - - Entypesidae
                  - Microstigmatidae

Crassitarsae is estimated to have diverged from its sister clade around 163–147 Ma (the end of the Jurassic), probably in Africa when it was part of Gondwana. The ancestral habit in Crassitarsae is believed to be living in a burrow with a trapdoor. However the trapdoor has been lost at least four times in different families, or replaced by a turret or collar around the burrow entrance. Trapdoors have been shown to reduce foraging efficiency, but may serve as protection from predators or adverse environmental factors, so that their loss may be explained by reduced selection pressure.

=== Families ===
According to Opatova et al. (2020), the clade includes the following families, some of which were first described at this rank in their study and others were circumscribed differently:

- Anamidae
- Barychelidae
- Bemmeridae
- Cyrtaucheniidae
- Dipluridae
- Entypesidae
- Microstigmatidae
- Nemesiidae
- Pycnothelidae
- Theraphosidae
