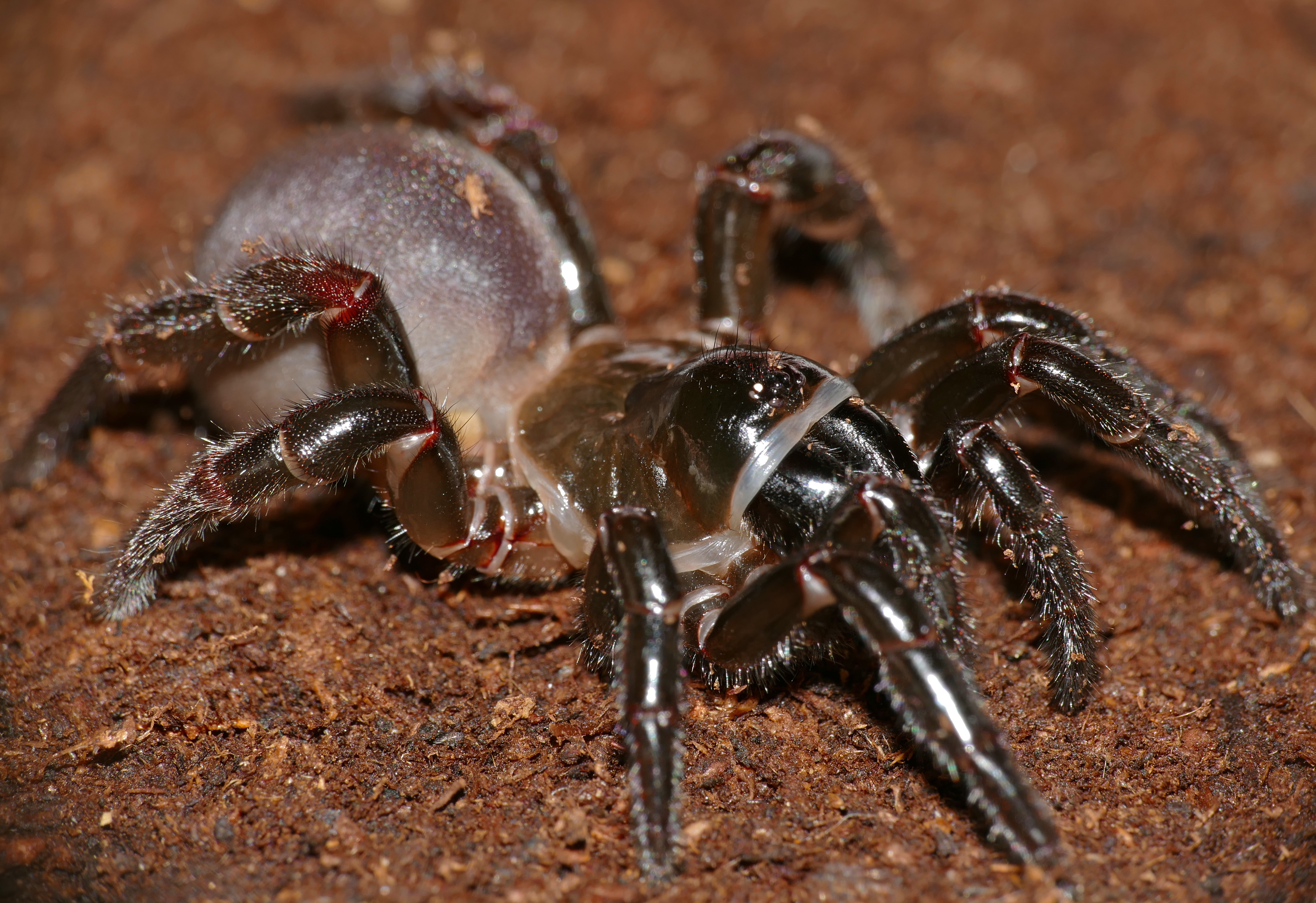
- Cteniza sauvagesi

Scientific classification
- Kingdom: Animalia
- Phylum: Arthropoda
- Subphylum: Chelicerata
- Class: Arachnida
- Order: Araneae
- Infraorder: Mygalomorphae
- Clade: Bipectina
- Clade: Domiothelina; Raven, 1985 (as a "megapicoorder")

Families
- See text.

= Domiothelina =

Clade of spiders

Domiothelina is a clade of avicularioid mygalomorph spiders first proposed by Robert J. Raven in 1985, based on a morphological cladistic analysis. Raven characterized the clade by a number of shared features, including the domed apical segment of the posterior lateral spinnerets. The clade has been supported to some degree by subsequent molecular analyses, although with a somewhat different composition.

== Taxonomy ==
The clade Domiothelina was first proposed by Robert J. Raven in 1985, based on a purely morphological cladistic analysis. Raven characterized the clade by a number of shared features, including the domed apical segment of the posterior lateral spinnerets (hence the name of the clade), a preliminary stage in the reduction of teeth on the claws, and the presence of an outer row of teeth on the cheliceral margin. The clade was supported by some subsequent analyses, including those that included molecular evidence, although with somewhat different family compositions. Spinneret morphology has been shown not to be useful for higher level classification in mygalomorph spiders, which now relies largely on molecular evidence.

=== Phylogeny ===
The preferred cladogram from a 2020 phylogenetic study of the Mygalomorphae is shown below. Domiothelina was resolved as one of the clades basal to the largest clade in the Bipectina, Crassitarsae. Some nodes within Bipectina had lower support (marked ♦ below), but Domiothelina was well supported.

- Avicularioidea
  - Basal families (6)
  - Bipectina
    - Paratropididae
    - - ♦
        - ♦
          - Stasimopidae
          - Venom Clade
            - Atracidae
            - Actinopodidae
        - Domiothelina
          - Halonoproctidae
          - - Migidae
            - - Idiopidae
              - - Ctenizidae
                - Euctenizidae
      - Crassitarsae (10 families)

Domiothelina is estimated to have diverged from its sister clade around 161–145 Ma (the end of the Jurassic). The ancestor of the Avicularioidea probably used a sheet web to aid in prey capture. Most extant members of the Bipectina clade, including Domiothelina, have instead a burrow with one or more trapdoors and radial alarm threads. Trapdoors have been shown to reduce foraging efficiency, but may serve as protection from predators or adverse environmental factors. Reduced selection pressure may explain why the euctenizid genus Apomastus has lost trapdoors and has an open burrow.

=== Families ===
According to Opatova et al. (2020), the clade includes the following families (as circumscribed by them):

- Ctenizidae
- Euctenizidae
- Halonoproctidae
- Idiopidae
- Migidae
