= Yamaratropis =

Scientific classification
- Kingdom: Animalia
- Phylum: Arthropoda
- Subphylum: Chelicerata
- Class: Arachnida
- Order: Araneae
- Infraorder: Mygalomorphae
- Family: Paratropididae
- Genus: Yamaratropis; Peñaherrera-R., Sherwood, León-E., Ríos-Tamayo & Drolshagen, 2025
- Species: Y. machinaza

Binomial name
- Yamaratropis machinaza Peñaherrera-R., Sherwood, León-E., Ríos-Tamayo & Drolshagen, 2025

Species of spider

Yamaratropis is a monotypic genus of spiders in the family Paratropididae containing the single species, Yamaratropis machinaza.

== Distribution ==
Yamaratropis machinaza has been recorded from Cerro Machinaza, Zamora Chinchipe, Ecuador.

== Etymology ==
The genus name is a combination of the Shuar-Chicham word "Yámaram" ("new") and the related genus Paratropis. The species is named after the type locality.
