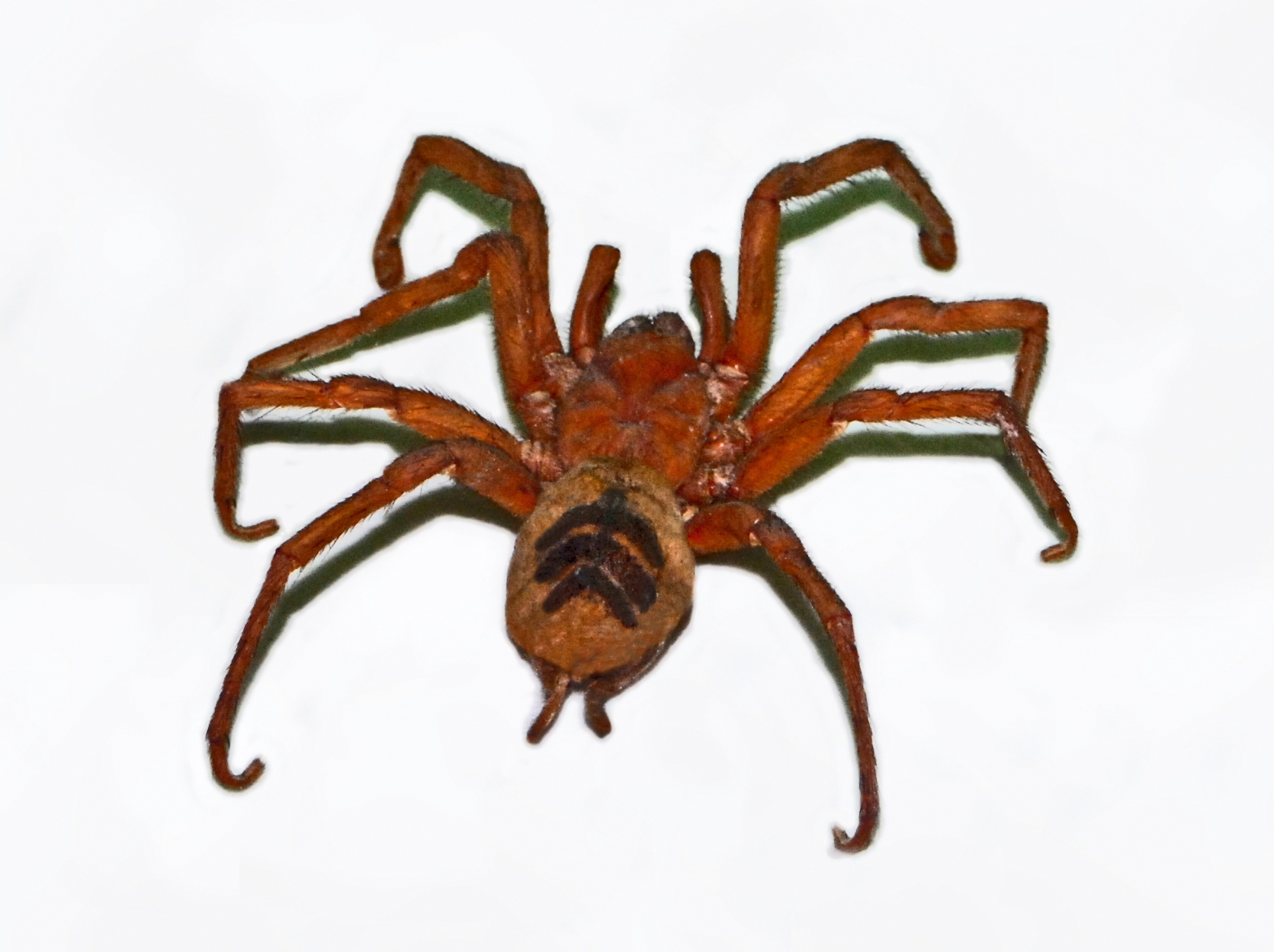
- Diplura lineata, a member of the family Dipluridae
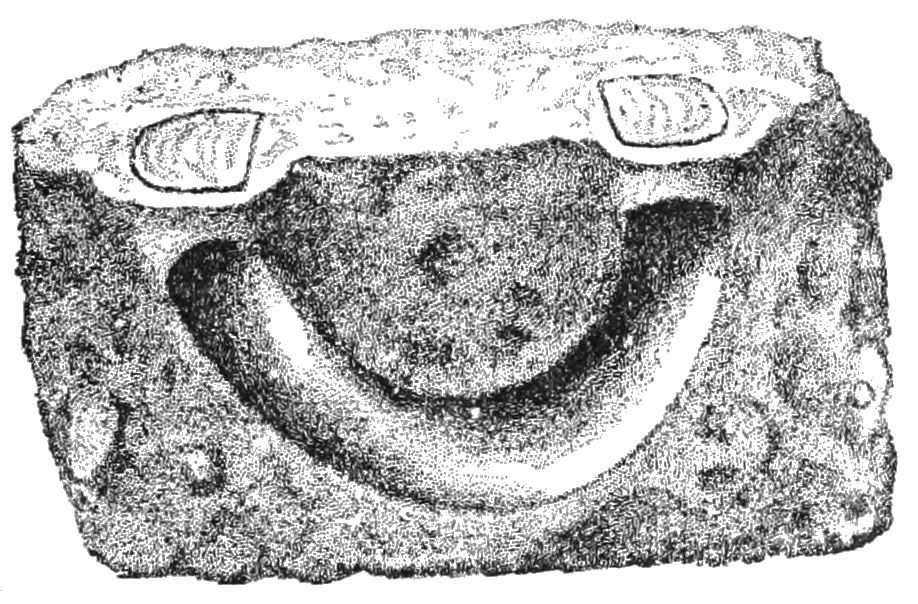
- Burrow of Trichopelma astuta, a member of the family Theraphosidae

Scientific classification
- Kingdom: Animalia
- Phylum: Arthropoda
- Subphylum: Chelicerata
- Class: Arachnida
- Order: Araneae
- Infraorder: Mygalomorphae
- Clade: Avicularioidea
- Clade: Bipectina; Goloboff, 1993

Families
- See text.

= Bipectina =

Clade of spiders

Bipectina is a clade of avicularioid mygalomorph spiders first proposed by Pablo A. Goloboff in 1993, based on a morphological cladistic analysis. The clade was marked by a number of morphological features, and in particular by the presence of two rows of teeth on the superior tarsal claws of the legs of both sexes, meaning that the claws were bipectinate. The clade was supported by some subsequent analyses, although not all. A major phylogenetic study in 2020 upheld the monophyly of the clade, which contained 19 of the 25 accepted families of the Avicularioidea.

The majority of extant members of the Bipectina clade live in a burrow with one or more trapdoors, many adding radial alarm threads that alert them to the presence of prey. Others have reverted to using various kinds of web, as the earliest avicularioids are believed to have done, or have lost trapdoors, living in open burrows.

== Taxonomy ==
The clade Bipectina was first proposed by Pablo A. Goloboff in 1993, based on a purely morphological cladistic analysis. One feature used in defining the clade was the bipectinate superior tarsal claws of the legs of both sexes (i.e. the claws had two rows of teeth). Females in the clade also had pedipalps in which their usual single rows of teeth were markedly displaced to the prolateral side of the claw. The clade was supported by most subsequent analyses, including those that included molecular evidence, although with different family compositions.

=== Phylogeny ===
The preferred cladogram from a 2020 phylogenetic study of the Mygalomorphae is shown below. Bipectina was resolved as a derived clade containing the majority of families of the Avicularioidea (19 out of 25). Some nodes within the clade had lower support (marked ♦ below), but the clade as a whole was well supported.

- Avicularioidea
  - Basal families (6)
  - Bipectina
    - Paratropididae
    - - ♦
        - ♦
          - Stasimopidae
          - Venom Clade
            - Atracidae
            - Actinopodidae
        - Domiothelina
          - Halonoproctidae
          - - Migidae
            - - Idiopidae
              - - Ctenizidae
                - Euctenizidae
      - Crassitarsae ♦
        - Theraphosoidina
          - Bemmeridae
          - - Barychelidae
            - Theraphosidae
        - "Nemesioidina"
          - Nemesiidae
          - - Pycnothelidae
            - - - Dipluridae
                - Cyrtaucheniidae
              - - Anamidae
                - - Entypesidae
                  - Microstigmatidae

Bipectina is estimated to have diverged from its sister (the small family Macrothelidae) around 179–162 Ma (roughly the middle of the Jurassic), possibly in Africa. The ancestor of the Avicularioidea probably used a sheet web to aid in prey capture. The status of the ancestor of Bipectina is not entirely clear, but the majority of current members of the Bipectina clade have a burrow with one or more trapdoors and radial alarm threads. Trapdoors have been shown to reduce foraging efficiency, but may serve as protection from predators or adverse environmental factors. Reduced selection pressure may explain why some members of the clade have lost trapdoors. Others have reverted to using some form of web in prey capture.

=== Families ===
According to Opatova et al. (2020), the clade includes the following families, some of which were first described at this rank in their study:

- Actinopodidae
- Anamidae
- Atracidae
- Barychelidae
- Bemmeridae
- Ctenizidae
- Cyrtaucheniidae
- Dipluridae
- Entypesidae
- Euctenizidae
- Halonoproctidae
- Idiopidae
- Microstigmatidae
- Migidae
- Nemesiidae
- Paratropididae
- Pycnothelidae
- Stasimopidae
- Theraphosidae
