= Inpatropis =

Scientific classification
- Kingdom: Animalia
- Phylum: Arthropoda
- Subphylum: Chelicerata
- Class: Arachnida
- Order: Araneae
- Infraorder: Mygalomorphae
- Family: Paratropididae
- Genus: Inpatropis; Peñaherrera-R., Sherwood, Ríos-Tamayo & Drolshagen, 2025
- Species: I. minuscula

Binomial name
- Inpatropis minuscula (Almeida & de Morais, 2022)

Species of spider

Inpatropis is a monotypic genus of spiders in the family Paratropididae containing the single species, Inpatropis minuscula.

== Distribution ==
Inpatropis minuscula has only been recorded from near the Potaro River in Guyana.

== Etymology ==
The genus name honors the Instituto Nacional de Pesquisas da Amazônia (INPA). The ending refers to the related genus Paratropis.
