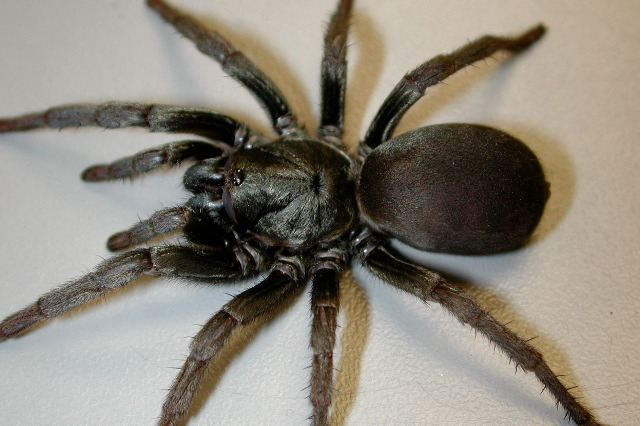
- Calisoga sp., a member of the family Nemesiidae

Scientific classification
- Kingdom: Animalia
- Phylum: Arthropoda
- Subphylum: Chelicerata
- Class: Arachnida
- Order: Araneae
- Infraorder: Mygalomorphae
- Clade: Crassitarsae
- Clade: Nemesioidina

Families
- See text.

= Nemesioidina =

Clade of spiders

Nemesioidina is a clade of avicularioid mygalomorph spiders proposed in 2020, based on a molecular phylogenetic analysis.

== Taxonomy ==
The clade was identified in a major 2020 phylogenetic study of the Mygalomorphae. The paper in which the study was published uses double-quotes around the name, for reasons that are not explained. In the preferred cladogram, Nemesioidina is sister to Theraphosoidina, treated as clade, but formally named and given a rank by Robert Raven in 1985, whereas Nemesioidina was not formally named. As traditionally circumscribed, the family Nemesiidae and others apparently related to it, particularly Cyrtaucheniidae and Dipluridae, were known not to be monophyletic, with the Cyrtaucheniidae probably representing at least four different and unrelated lineages. Opatova et al. suggest that because of its improved sampling and high support values, their 2020 study "brings long-needed insight and resolution to the 'nemesiid' problem". They re-circumscribed families and created new ones by elevating sub-family taxa to family rank. The resulting families were monophyletic (although some genera remain unsampled), as was the Nemesioidina as a whole.

=== Phylogeny ===
An outline version of the preferred cladogram from a 2020 phylogenetic study of the Mygalomorphae is shown below. (A node with lower support is marked ♦.)

- Avicularioidea
  - Basal families (6)
  - Bipectina
    - Paratropididae
    - - ♦ 8 families
      - Crassitarsae
        - Theraphosoidina (3 families)
        - Nemesioidina
          - Nemesiidae
          - - Pycnothelidae
            - - - Dipluridae
                - Cyrtaucheniidae
              - - Anamidae
                - - Entypesidae
                  - Microstigmatidae

The earliest ancestor of the Nemesioidina is estimated to have diverged around 125 Ma (early to middle Cretaceous). It probably lived in a burrow with a trapdoor, as did ancestral members of the Crassitarsae. However, the trapdoor has been lost or replaced by a turret or collar around the entrance in some members of the Nemesiidae, Pycnothelidae and Anamidae. Trapdoors have been shown to reduce foraging efficiency, but may serve as protection from predators or adverse environmental factors, so that their loss may be explained by reduced selection pressure. Some diplurids have regained the even more ancestral condition of catching prey in a sheet-like web.

=== Families ===
According to Opatova et al. (2020), the clade includes the following families, three of which (Anamidae, Entypesidae and Pycnothelidae) were formerly treated within Nemesiidae, and were elevated to families as a result of the study:

- Anamidae – elevated from a tribe within Nemesiidae
- Cyrtaucheniidae – re-circumscribed; may still not be monophyletic as other genera need to be studied
- Dipluridae – re-circumscribed; may still not be monophyletic as other genera need to be studied
- Entypesidae – new family for genera previously within Nemesiidae
- Microstigmatidae – re-circumscribed
- Nemesiidae – re-circumscribed (much reduced)
- Pycnothelidae – restored to family rank after being sunk into Nemesiidae
