= Anisaspis =

Scientific classification
- Kingdom: Animalia
- Phylum: Arthropoda
- Subphylum: Chelicerata
- Class: Arachnida
- Order: Araneae
- Infraorder: Mygalomorphae
- Family: Paratropididae
- Genus: Anisaspis; Simon, 1892

Type species
- Anisaspis tuberculata Simon, 1892

Genus of spiders

Anisaspis is a doubtful genus of baldlegged spiders that was first described by Eugène Louis Simon in 1892. As of June 2026 it contains only the type species, found only in Saint Vincent, Anisaspis tuberculata. As of 2026, Anisapis was considered a nomen dubium, as the type appeared to be an immature and so not clearly identifiable. A second species that has been placed in the genus, Anisaspis camarita, first described in 2019, was transferred to the genus Anisaspoides in 2025.
