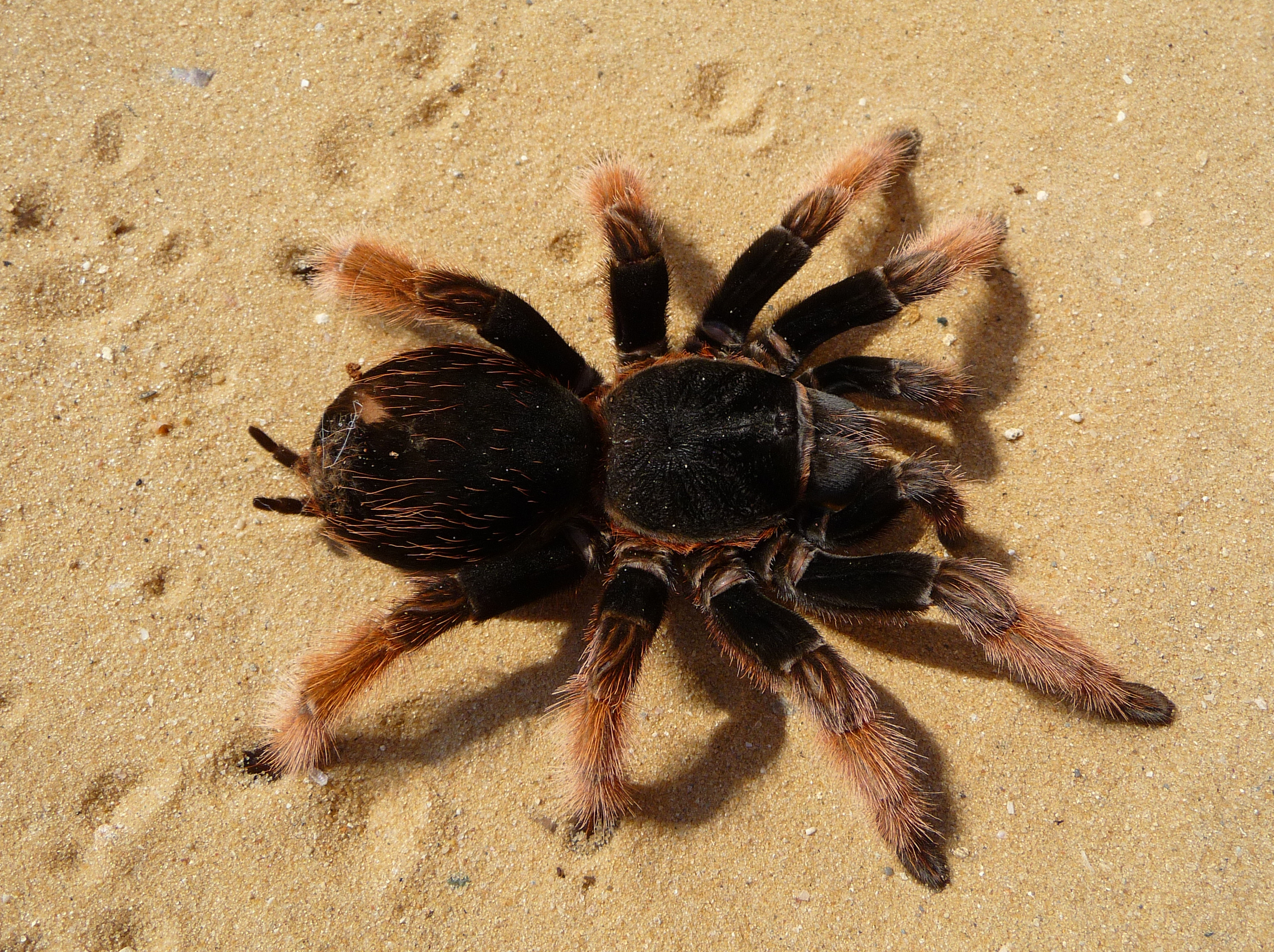
- Brachypelma klaasi, a member of the Theraphosidae

Scientific classification
- Kingdom: Animalia
- Phylum: Arthropoda
- Subphylum: Chelicerata
- Class: Arachnida
- Order: Araneae
- Infraorder: Mygalomorphae
- Clade: Crassitarsae
- Clade: Theraphosoidina; Raven, 1985 (as a "micropicoorder")

Families
- See text.

= Theraphosoidina =

Clade of spiders

Theraphosoidina is a clade of avicularioid mygalomorph spiders first proposed by Robert J. Raven in 1985, based on a morphological cladistic analysis. Raven included three families: Theraphosidae, Paratropididae and Barychelidae. Subsequent molecular phylogenetic studies upheld the relationship between the Theraphosidae and Barychelidae, but found that Paratropidae fell outside the clade.

== Taxonomy ==
Theraphosoidina was first proposed as a taxon by Robert J. Raven in 1985, based on a morphological cladistic analysis. Raven included three families: Theraphosidae, Paratropididae and Barychelidae. The group was characterized by the similar conformation of the male tibial spur (used in mating), reduced toothing of the paired claws and many labial cuspules.

Subsequent molecular phylogenetic studies upheld the relationship between the Theraphosidae and Barychelidae, but found that Paratropidae fell outside the clade. In 2012, it was suggested that Theraphosoidina should probably include an additional family of spiders related to Homostola. A major 2020 study of the Mygalomorphae established the new family Bemmeridae (raised from the rank of tribe) containing the two genera Homostola and Spiroctenus and included it within Theraphosoidina.

=== Phylogeny ===
An outline version of the preferred cladogram from a 2020 phylogenetic study of the Mygalomorphae is shown below. (A node with lower support is marked ♦.) Although the precise position of the Theraphosoidina clade varied in some of the individual analyses, the clade itself was well supported.

- Avicularioidea
  - Basal families (6)
  - Bipectina
    - Paratropididae
    - - ♦ 8 families
      - Crassitarsae
        - Theraphosoidina
          - Bemmeridae
          - - Barychelidae
            - Theraphosidae
        - "Nemesioidina" (7 families)

=== Families ===
According to Opatova et al. (2020), the clade includes the following families, one of which (Bemmeridae) was first described at this rank in their study:

- Barychelidae
- Bemmeridae
- Theraphosidae
