= Allpanuna =

Scientific classification
- Kingdom: Animalia
- Phylum: Arthropoda
- Subphylum: Chelicerata
- Class: Arachnida
- Order: Araneae
- Infraorder: Mygalomorphae
- Family: Paratropididae
- Genus: Allpanuna; Peñaherrera-R., Sherwood, León-E., Ríos-Tamayo & Drolshagen, 2026

Species
- 8, see text

Genus of spiders

Allpanuna is a genus of spiders in the family Paratropididae. It was described in 2025 under the name Alienus, but this had already been used for a genus of beetles in 2010, and the replacement name Allpanuna was published in 2026.

== Distribution ==
The genus Allpanuna is endemic to Ecuador.

== Species ==
As of June 2026, this genus includes eight species:

- Allpanuna abditus (Peñaherrera-R., Sherwood, Ríos-Tamayo & Drolshagen, 2025) – Ecuador
- Allpanuna alo (Peñaherrera-R., Sherwood, León-E., Ríos-Tamayo & Drolshagen, 2025) – Ecuador
- Allpanuna awa (Sherwood, Brescovit & Lucas, 2023) – Ecuador
- Allpanuna basho (Sherwood, Drolshagen, Peñaherrera-R. & Ríos-Tamayo, 2025) – Ecuador
- Allpanuna croceus (Peñaherrera-R., Sherwood, Ríos-Tamayo & Drolshagen, 2025) – Ecuador
- Allpanuna pasochoa (Dupérré & Tapia, 2024) – Ecuador
- Allpanuna pollex (Peñaherrera-R., Sherwood, León-E., Ríos-Tamayo & Drolshagen, 2025) – Ecuador
- Allpanuna roigi (Ríos-Tamayo, Sherwood, Peñaherrera-R., León-E. & Drolshagen, 2025) – Ecuador
