= Apomastus schlingeri =

Scientific classification
- Domain: Eukaryota
- Kingdom: Animalia
- Phylum: Arthropoda
- Subphylum: Chelicerata
- Class: Arachnida
- Order: Araneae
- Infraorder: Mygalomorphae
- Family: Euctenizidae
- Genus: Apomastus
- Species: A. schlingeri

Binomial name
- Apomastus schlingeri Bond & Opell, 2002

Species of spider

Apomastus schlingeri (misnomer Aptostichus schlingeri) is a species of venomous spiders belonging to a family of trapdoor spiders. They produce a complex of neurotoxins called aptotoxins. Both known species of the genus are found in the United States.

== Venom ==
Apomastus schlingeri have a venom that is highly neurotoxic in effect. The neurotoxin is actually a complex of proteins called aptotoxins (Aps for short), which in turn belong to a group of neurotoxins called cyrtautoxins. There are at least nine different peptides, and most of them are directly paralytic and lethal to insect larvae. All of the peptides are voltage-gated sodium channel blockers. To date, Aps III is known to be the most potent peptide of all.
