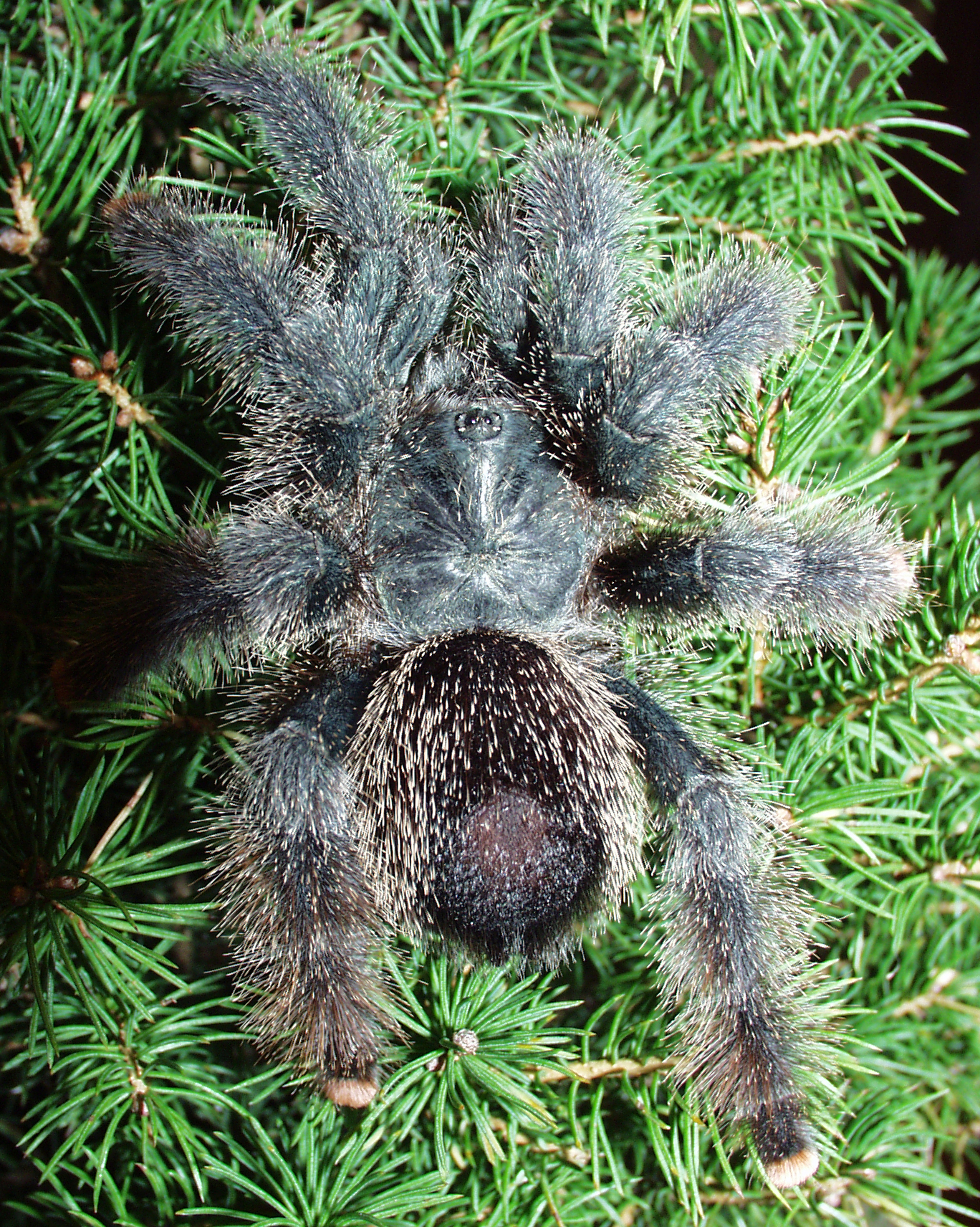
- young Avicularia metallica, Theraphosidae

Scientific classification
- Kingdom: Animalia
- Phylum: Arthropoda
- Subphylum: Chelicerata
- Class: Arachnida
- Order: Araneae
- Infraorder: Mygalomorphae
- Superfamily: Theraphosoidea

Families
- Theraphosidae; Paratropididae

Diversity
- 2 families, 905 species

= Theraphosoidea =

Superfamily of spiders

The Theraphosoidea are a superfamily of mygalomorph spiders. They contain two families of spiders:

- Theraphosidae, the true tarantulas
- Paratropididae, the bald-legged spiders
