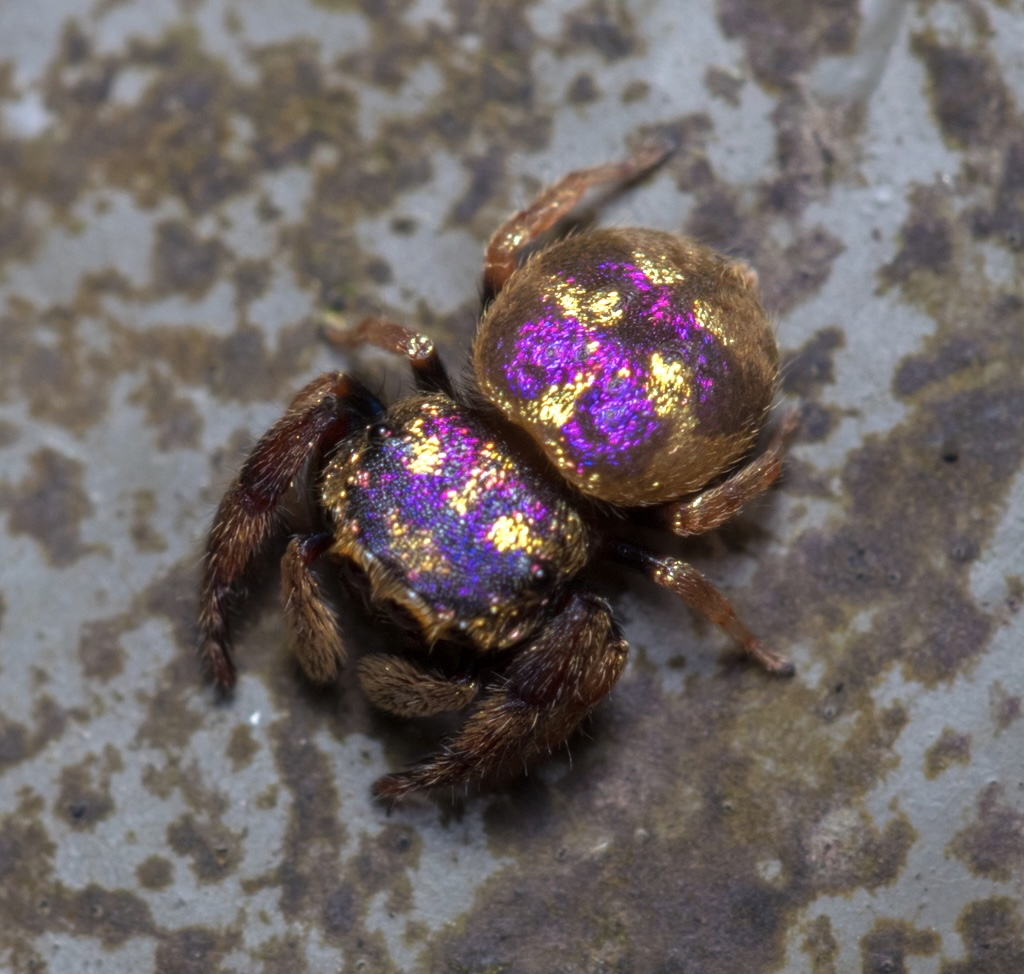
- Male
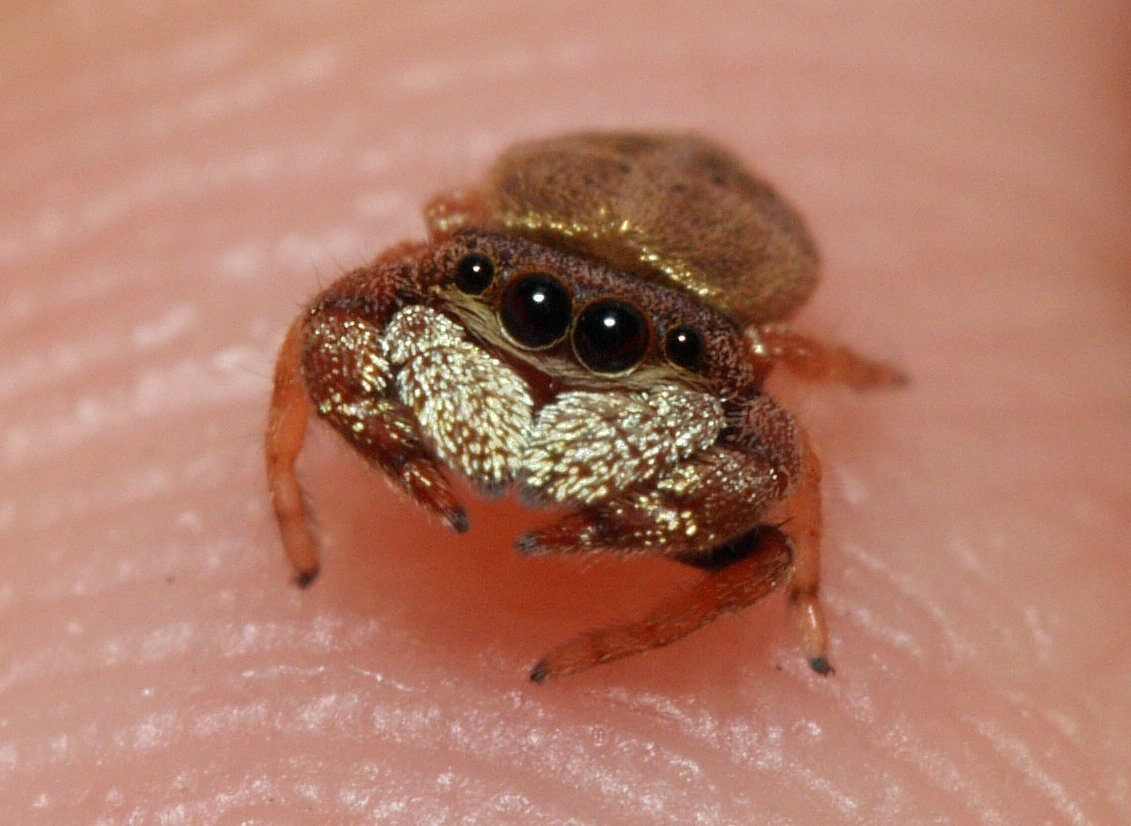
- Female

Scientific classification
- Kingdom: Animalia
- Phylum: Arthropoda
- Subphylum: Chelicerata
- Class: Arachnida
- Order: Araneae
- Infraorder: Araneomorphae
- Family: Salticidae
- Genus: Irura
- Species: I. bidenticulata

Binomial name
- Irura bidenticulata (Guo, Zhang & Zu, 2011)

= Irura bidenticulata =

Species of spider

Irura bidenticulata, commonly known as the purple-gold jumping spider, is a species of salticid. As the name implies, while females tend to take on a more dull coloration, males are characterized by their striking, shiny magenta-gold patterned bodies. Discovered in 2011, the spider had initially been mistaken for a member of the Simaetha genus. Native to regions of Southeast Asia, it was first spotted in Hainan, China, having since also been located in the Saraburi province of Thailand, Cambodia, Hong Kong, and Assam.

== Description ==
The purple-gold jumping spider typically measures 5–6 mm (0.20–0.24 in). It is sexually dimorphic; most females of the species are of an almost solid gold pigmentation (though some may exhibit a muted brown pattern resembling that of a male), while males are known for their dazzling purple-pink and gold patterned reflective trichobothria. The unique purple pattern on males' abdomens best described as "a snow angel wearing a tophat" surrounded by gold coloration tends to remain the same. However, the purple-gold pattern on the top of their heads often varies slightly between individuals, as do their pedipalps. The cheliceras are occasionally black-tipped, in addition to the base of the extremities.

== Gallery ==
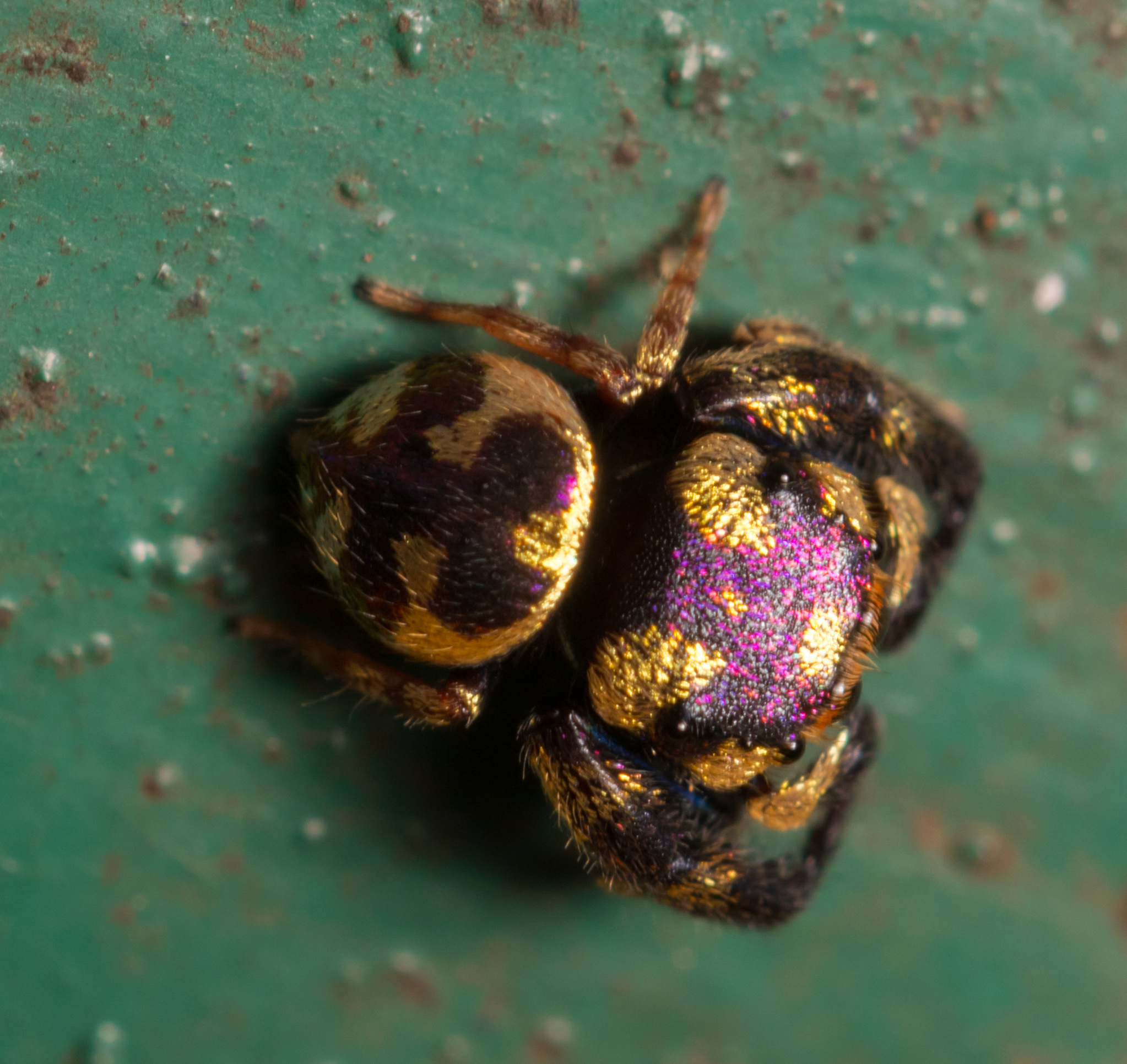
Dorsal view of male specimen

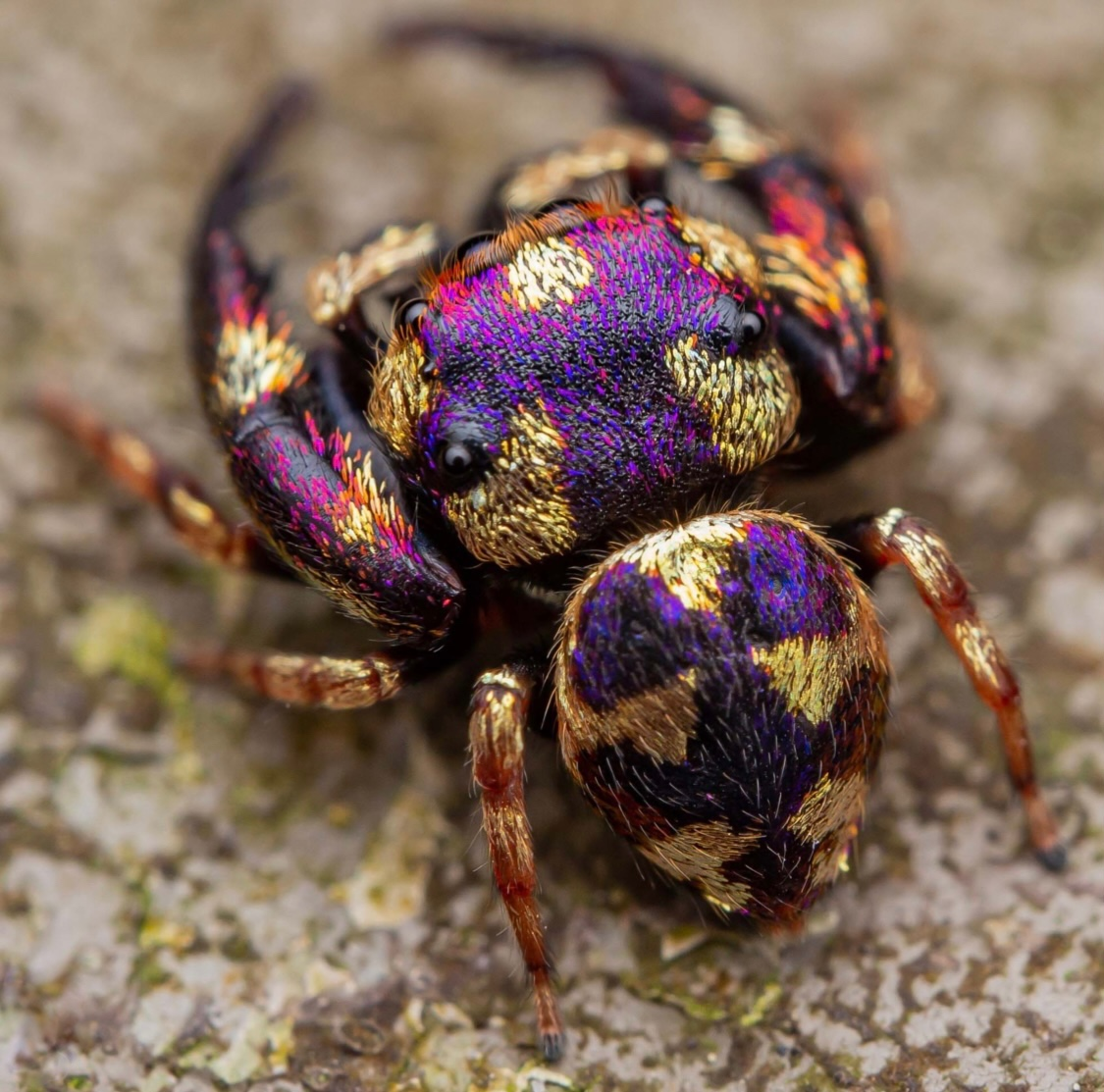
High-definition male closeup

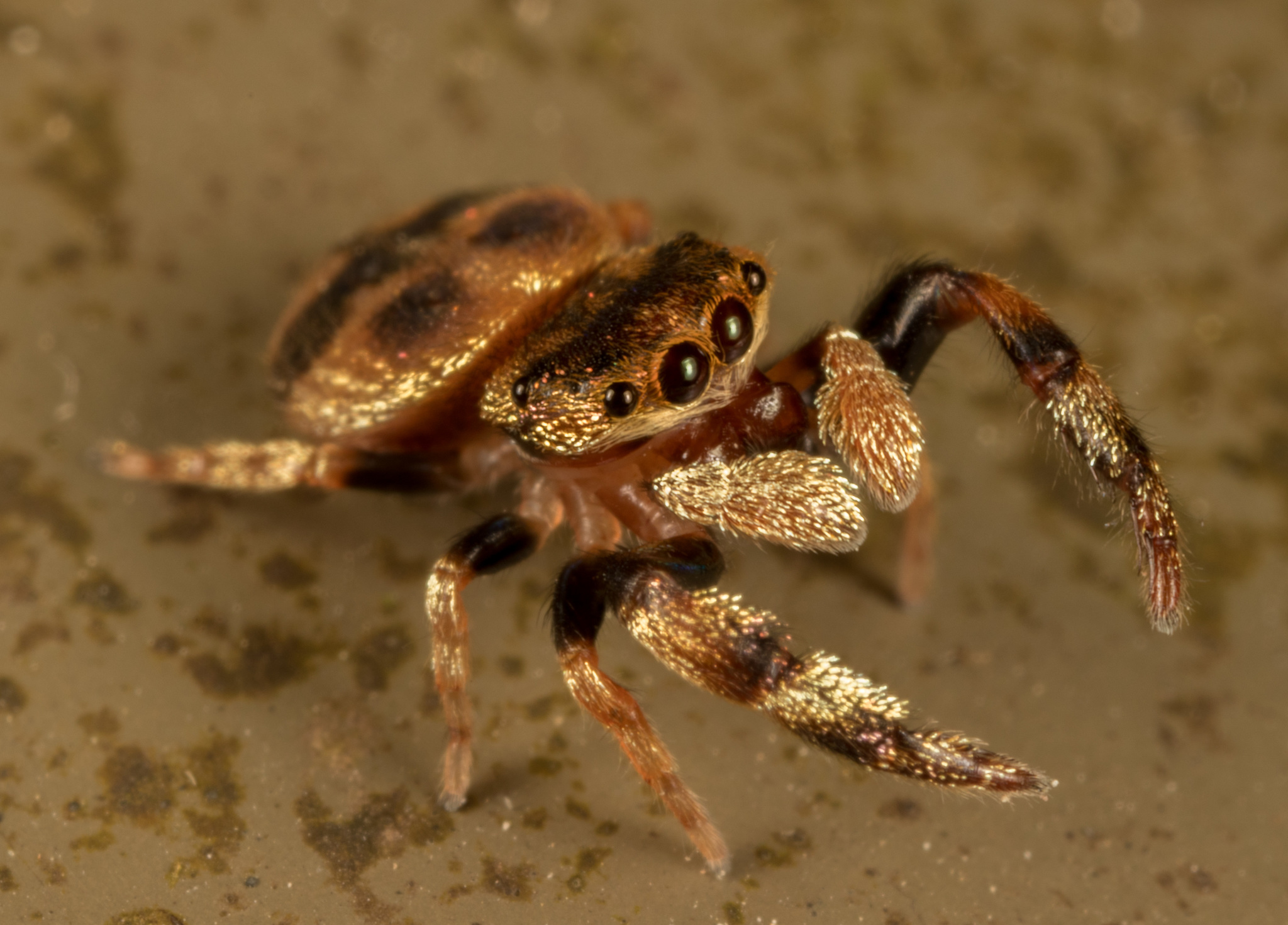
Female frontal macro

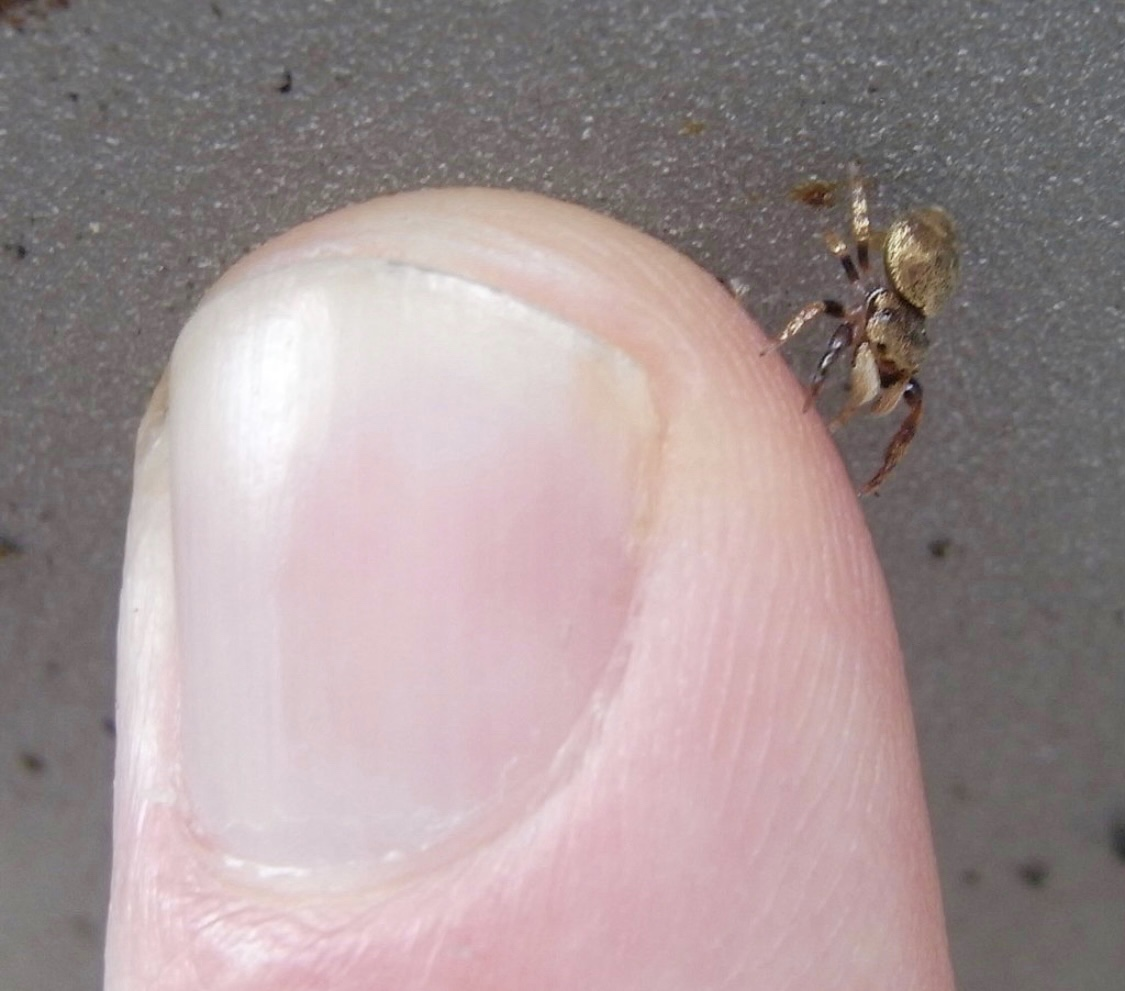
Female next to human thumb for scale
