= Apomastus kristenae =

Scientific classification
- Domain: Eukaryota
- Kingdom: Animalia
- Phylum: Arthropoda
- Subphylum: Chelicerata
- Class: Arachnida
- Order: Araneae
- Infraorder: Mygalomorphae
- Family: Euctenizidae
- Genus: Apomastus
- Species: A. kristenae

Binomial name
- Apomastus kristenae Bond, 2004

Species of spider

Apomastus kristenae is a species of wafer-lid trapdoor spider in the family Euctenizidae. It is found in the United States.
