= Anisaspoides gigantea =

Scientific classification
- Kingdom: Animalia
- Phylum: Arthropoda
- Subphylum: Chelicerata
- Class: Arachnida
- Order: Araneae
- Infraorder: Mygalomorphae
- Family: Paratropididae
- Genus: Anisaspoides
- Species: A. gigantea

Binomial name
- Anisaspoides gigantea F. O. Pickard-Cambridge, 1896

Species of spider

Anisaspoides gigantea is a species of spider in the family Paratropididae, found in Brazil. It was first described by F. O. Pickard-Cambridge in 1896.
