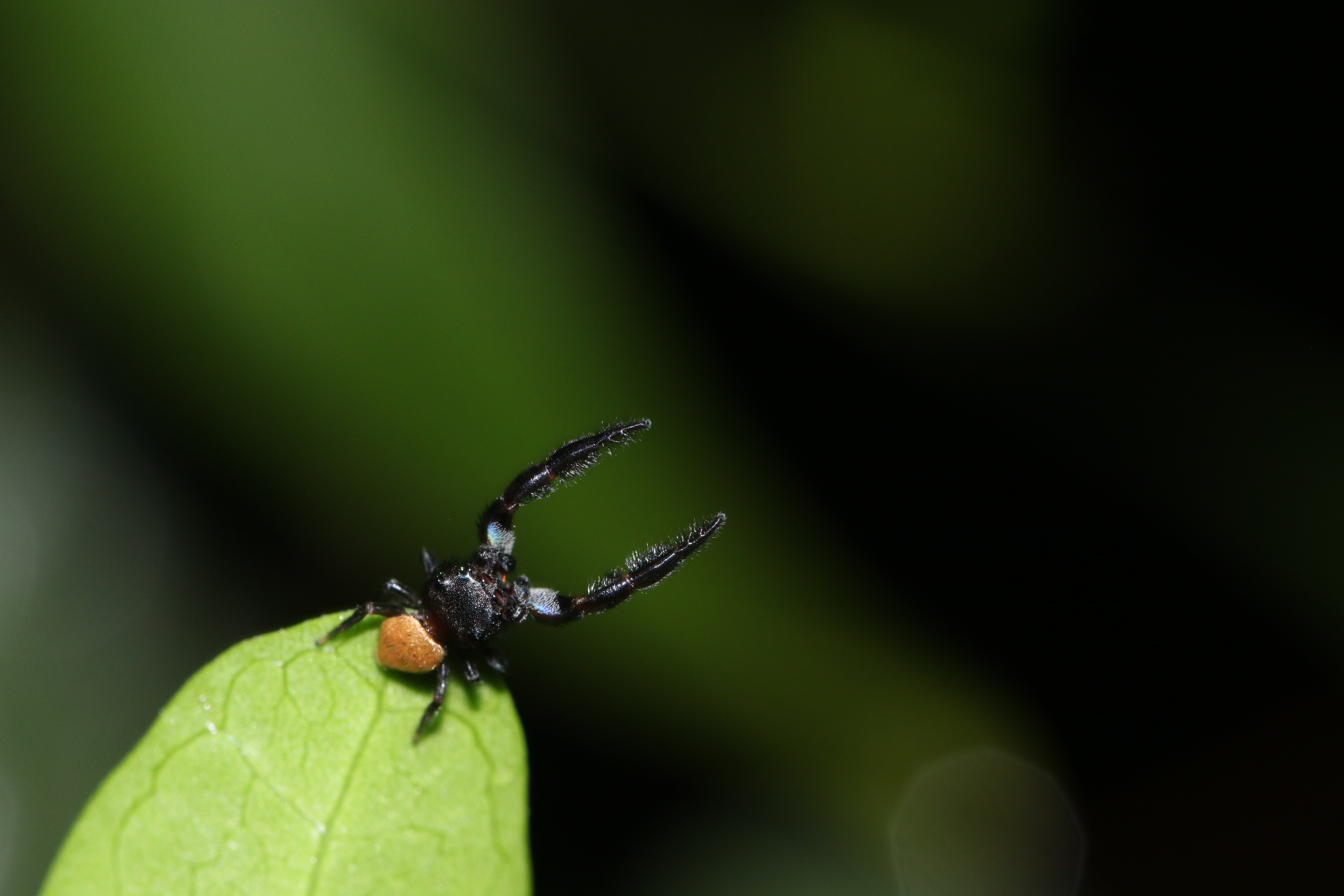
- A male Irura mandarina

Scientific classification
- Kingdom: Animalia
- Phylum: Arthropoda
- Subphylum: Chelicerata
- Class: Arachnida
- Order: Araneae
- Infraorder: Araneomorphae
- Family: Salticidae
- Genus: Irura
- Species: I. mandarina

Binomial name
- Irura mandarina Simon, 1903

= Irura mandarina =

Species of spider

Irura mandarina, also known as the goldenback jumping spider, is a species of jumping spider found in China, Vietnam and India.
