= Irura pulchra =

Scientific classification
- Kingdom: Animalia
- Phylum: Arthropoda
- Subphylum: Chelicerata
- Class: Arachnida
- Order: Araneae
- Infraorder: Araneomorphae
- Family: Salticidae
- Genus: Irura
- Species: I. pulchra

Binomial name
- Irura pulchra Peckham & Peckham, 1901

Species of spider

Irura pulchra is a species of spider of the genus Irura. It is endemic to Sri Lanka.
