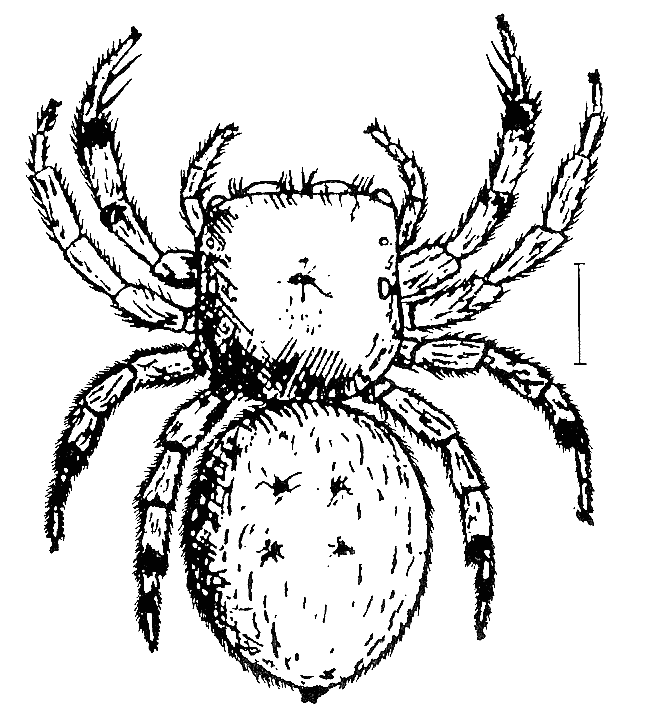
- Female Irura pygaea

Scientific classification
- Kingdom: Animalia
- Phylum: Arthropoda
- Subphylum: Chelicerata
- Class: Arachnida
- Order: Araneae
- Infraorder: Araneomorphae
- Family: Salticidae
- Subfamily: Salticinae
- Genus: Irura; Peckham & Peckham, 1901

Type species
- Irura pulchra Peckham & Peckham, 1901

Species
- See text.

= Irura (spider) =

Genus of spiders

Irura is a genus of the spider family Salticidae (jumping spiders).

== Species ==
As of August 2022, the World Spider Catalog lists 20 species in the genus

- Irura bicolor Żabka, 1985 – Vietnam
- Irura bidenticulata Guo, Zhang & Zhu, 2011 – China
- Irura hamatapophysis (Peng & Yin, 1991) – China
- Irura johnmurphyi (Logunov, 2022) – Malaysia (peninsula)
- Irura liae (Wang & Li, 2022) – China (Hainan)
- Irura longiochelicera (Peng & Yin, 1991) – China
- Irura lvshilinensis (Wang & Li, 2020) – China
- Irura mandarina Simon, 1903 – Southeast Asia
- Irura mii (Wang & Li, 2022) – China (Hainan)
- Irura montiformis Gan, Wang & Peng, 2017 – China
- Irura onoi (Prószyński & Deeleman-Reinhold, 2013) – Malaysia (peninsula), Indonesia (Borneo)
- Irura pengi Guo, Zhang & Zhu, 2011 – China
- Irura pulchra Peckham & Peckham, 1901 – Sri Lanka
- Irura pygaea (Thorell, 1891) – Malaysia
- Irura trigonapophysis (Peng & Yin, 1991) – China
- Irura uniprocessa (Mi & Wang, 2016) – China
- Irura yinae Gan, Wang & Peng, 2017 – China
- Irura yueluensis (Peng & Yin, 1991) – China
- Irura yunnanensis (Peng & Yin, 1991) – China
- Irura zhangae Gan, Wang & Peng, 2017 – China
