= Apomastus =

Scientific classification
- Kingdom: Animalia
- Phylum: Arthropoda
- Subphylum: Chelicerata
- Class: Arachnida
- Order: Araneae
- Infraorder: Mygalomorphae
- Family: Euctenizidae
- Genus: Apomastus; Bond & Opell, 2002

Type species
- A. schlingeri Bond & Opell, 2002

Species
- A. kristenae Bond, 2004 – USA; A. schlingeri Bond & Opell, 2002 – USA

Genus of spiders

Apomastus is a genus of North American mygalomorph spiders in the family Euctenizidae, and was first described by Jason Bond & B. D. Opell in 2002. As of May 2019 it contains only two species, both found in the Los Angeles Basin of southern California: A. kristenae and A. schlingeri.
