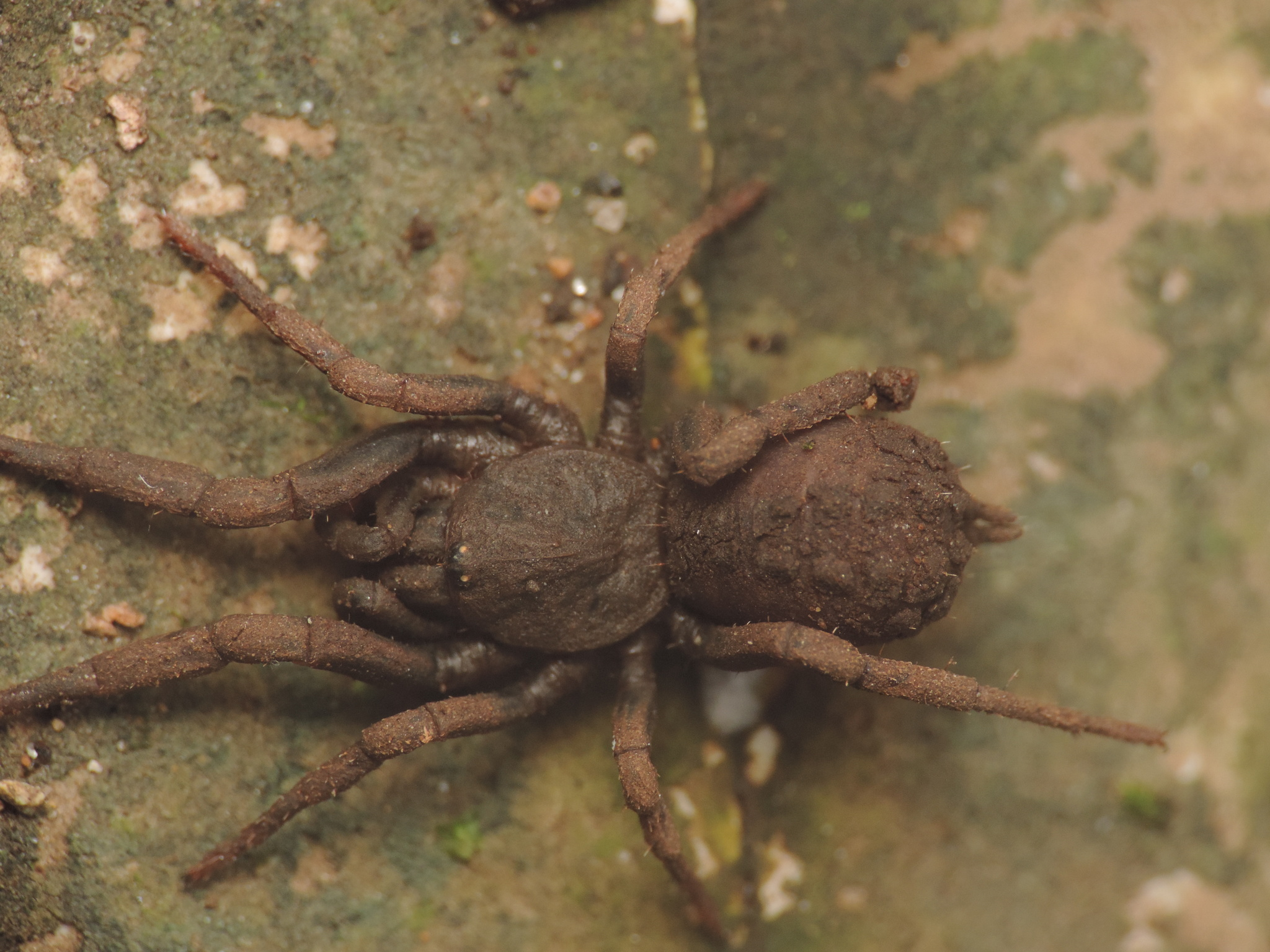
- S. paisa in Colombia
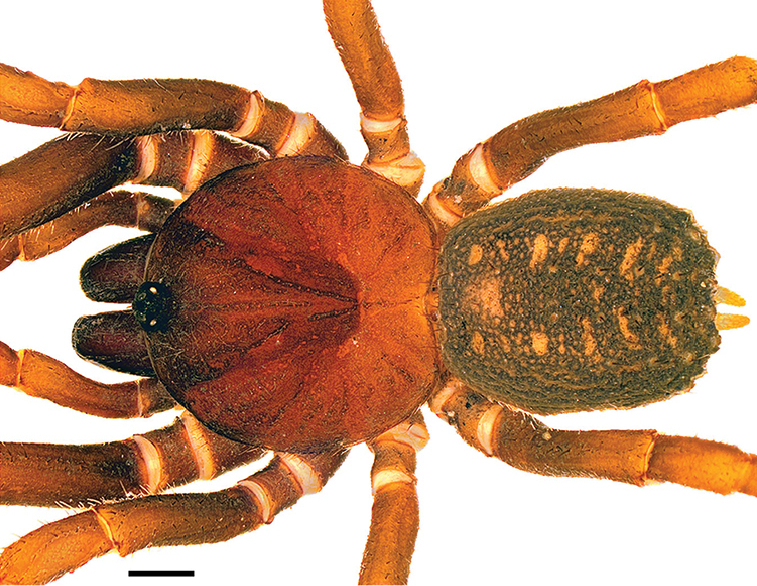
- Stormtropis muisca, male

Scientific classification
- Kingdom: Animalia
- Phylum: Arthropoda
- Subphylum: Chelicerata
- Class: Arachnida
- Order: Araneae
- Infraorder: Mygalomorphae
- Family: Paratropididae
- Genus: Stormtropis; Perafán, Galvis & Pérez-Miles, 2019

Type species
- Stormtropis parvum Perafán, Galvis & Pérez-Miles, 2019

Species
- 8, see text

= Stormtropis =

Genus of spiders

Stormtropis is a genus of South American baldlegged spiders first described by C. Perafán, W. Galvis & Fernando Pérez-Miles in 2019. The genus name is in reference to the fictional stormtroopers of the Star Wars franchise.

== Species ==
As of January 2026, this genus includes eight species:

- Stormtropis barbacoas Ríos-Tamayo, Sherwood, Peñaherrera-R. & Drolshagen, 2025 – Colombia
- Stormtropis celiae (Santos, Gomes, Almeida, de Morais & Bertani, 2025) – Brazil
- Stormtropis colima Perafán, Galvis & Pérez-Miles, 2019 – Colombia
- Stormtropis dunlopi Ríos-Tamayo, Sherwood, Peñaherrera-R. & Drolshagen, 2025 – Venezuela
- Stormtropis manauara (Santos, Gomes, Almeida, de Morais & Bertani, 2025) – Brazil
- Stormtropis muisca Perafán, Galvis & Pérez-Miles, 2019 – Colombia
- Stormtropis paisa Perafán, Galvis & Pérez-Miles, 2019 – Colombia
- Stormtropis parvum Perafán, Galvis & Pérez-Miles, 2019 – Colombia
