= Rosamygale =

Rosamygale Temporal range: Anisian

Scientific classification
- Kingdom: Animalia
- Phylum: Arthropoda
- Subphylum: Chelicerata
- Class: Arachnida
- Order: Araneae
- Infraorder: Mygalomorphae
- Clade: Avicularioidea
- Genus: †Rosamygale; Selden & Gall, 1992
- Species: †R. grauvogeli

Binomial name
- †Rosamygale grauvogeli Selden & Gall, 1992

Extinct genus of spiders

Rosamygale is a genus of extinct Triassic spiders, with a single described species, Rosamygale grauvogeli. It is the oldest known member of the Mygalomorphae, one of the three main divisions of spiders, which includes well known forms such as tarantulas and Australian funnel-web spiders. It was described by Selden and Gall in 1992, from specimens found in the Middle Triassic (Anisian ~ 247-242 million years ago) aged Gres a Meules and Grès à Voltzia geological formations in France. It is also considered to be the oldest known member of the Avicularioidea, one of the two main divisions of Mygalomorphae.

== Description ==
Rosamygale is known from compression fossils consisting of brown-coloured organic cuticle remains of several juvenile and adult individuals, up to 6 millimetres (1/4 in) in length.

== Phylogeny ==
In the original description, Rosamygale was placed in the Hexathelidae, with reservations. However, later studies noted that it was placed in the family based on characters that are plesiomorphic (ancestral) for many groups of mygalomorphs. It can be securely placed in Avicularioidea, one of the two major groupings of mygalomorph spiders based on the absence of an abdominal scutum (a hard plate located on the underside of the body) and well-separated posterior lateral spinnerets (silk-spinning organs).

== Palaeoenvironment ==
The sediments where the spiders were discovered represents a deltaic environment, with the fossil found in what likely was a stagnant brackish pond that filled during the rainy season, surrounded by sparse vegetation. Associated terrestrial fauna includes scorpions, myriapods and insects. With an associated aquatic fauna containing the brachiopod Lingula, clam shrimps, and fish. The authors speculated, due to the nature of the locality, that Rosamygale burrowed into or near the banks of water courses. Primitive avicularioids such as Rosamygale are thought to have hunted using funnel and sheet webs.
