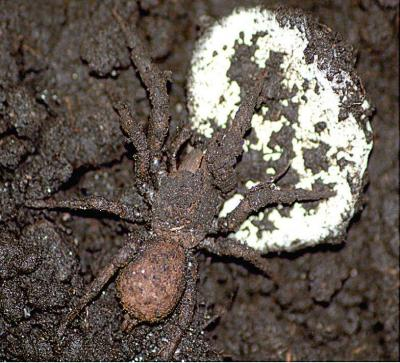
- Female with egg sac

Scientific classification
- Domain: Eukaryota
- Kingdom: Animalia
- Phylum: Arthropoda
- Subphylum: Chelicerata
- Class: Arachnida
- Order: Araneae
- Infraorder: Mygalomorphae
- Family: Paratropididae
- Genus: Paratropis
- Species: P. tuxtlensis

Binomial name
- Paratropis tuxtlensis Valdez-Mondragón, Mendoza & Francke, 2014

= Paratropis tuxtlensis =

Species of spider

Paratropis tuxtlensis is a species of spider in the family Paratropididae. Discovered in 2014 by a group of researchers from the National Autonomous University of Mexico, the species is only known to occur in the Volcán San Martin Biosphere Reserve in Veracruz, Mexico.

== Description ==
The holotype male measured 8.20 millimeters in length, and the paratype female measured 12.90 millimeters. When cleansed of soil (see Behavior, below) the body is reddish, with orange coloration on its chelicerae, sternum, endites, and labium. Legs are olive colored, and spinnerets are yellow.

Paratropis tuxtlensis is distinguished from Paratropis papilligera, the only other species of Paratropis where the male is known, by its conical as opposed to cylindrical tibia and by the number of teeth in the cheliceral furrows: P. tuxtlensis has a total of 20 while P. papilligera has 24.

The species has an orbiculate carapace and legs covered in barbed and clubbed setae.

== Range and habitat ==
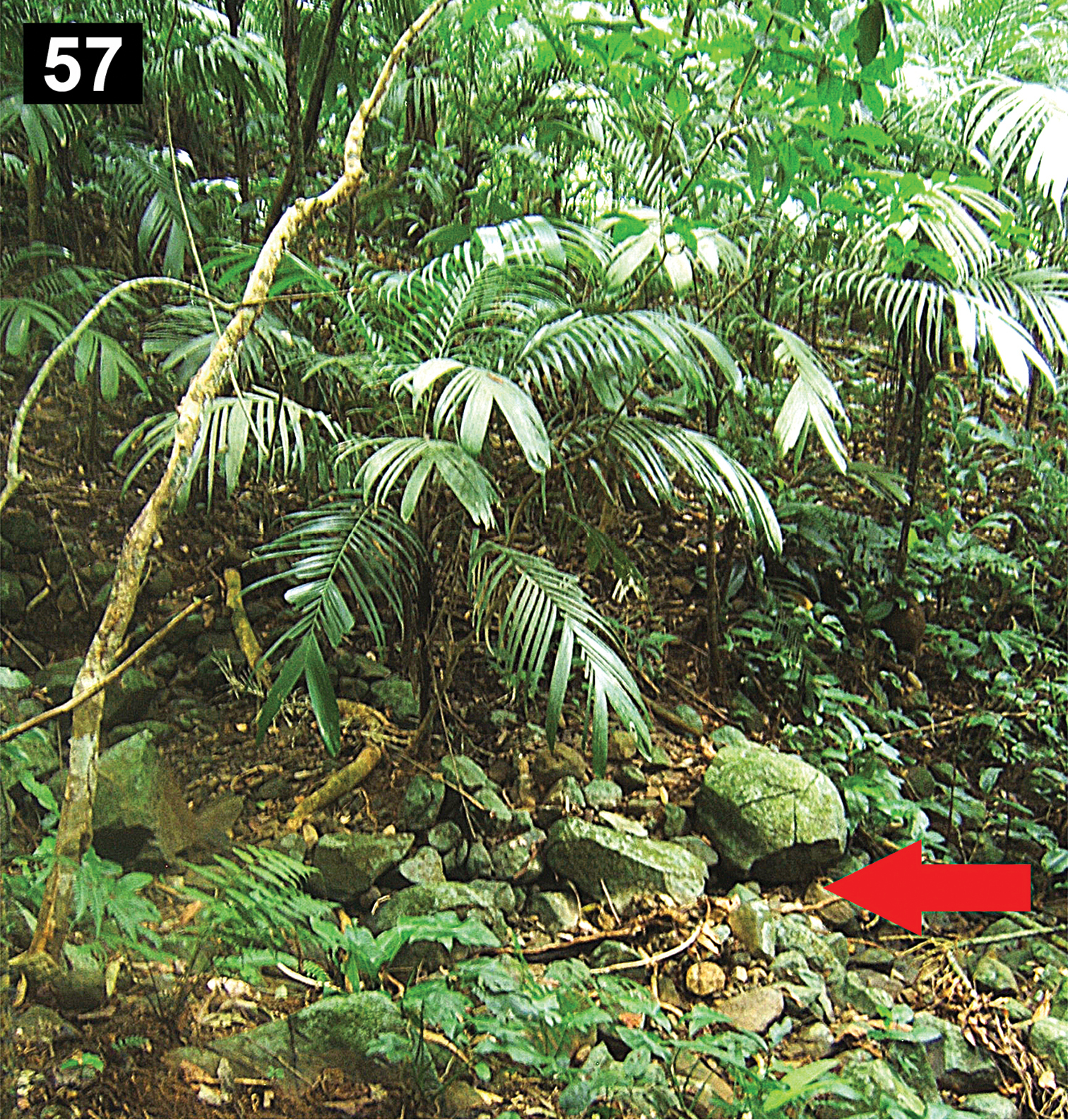
Paratropis tuxtlensis habitat and microhabitat under boulders (arrow)

Paratropis tuxtlensis is the first member of the family Paratropididae to be found in North America. It is native to tropical rainforest in Veracruz, Mexico. The first recorded specimens were discovered under rocks at an elevation of 1,039 metres (3,409 ft); two more individuals were collected nearby at a lower elevation.

== Etymology ==
The species name P. tuxtlensis is derived from Los Tuxtlas, Veracruz, the only place to date where it has been found.

== Behavior ==
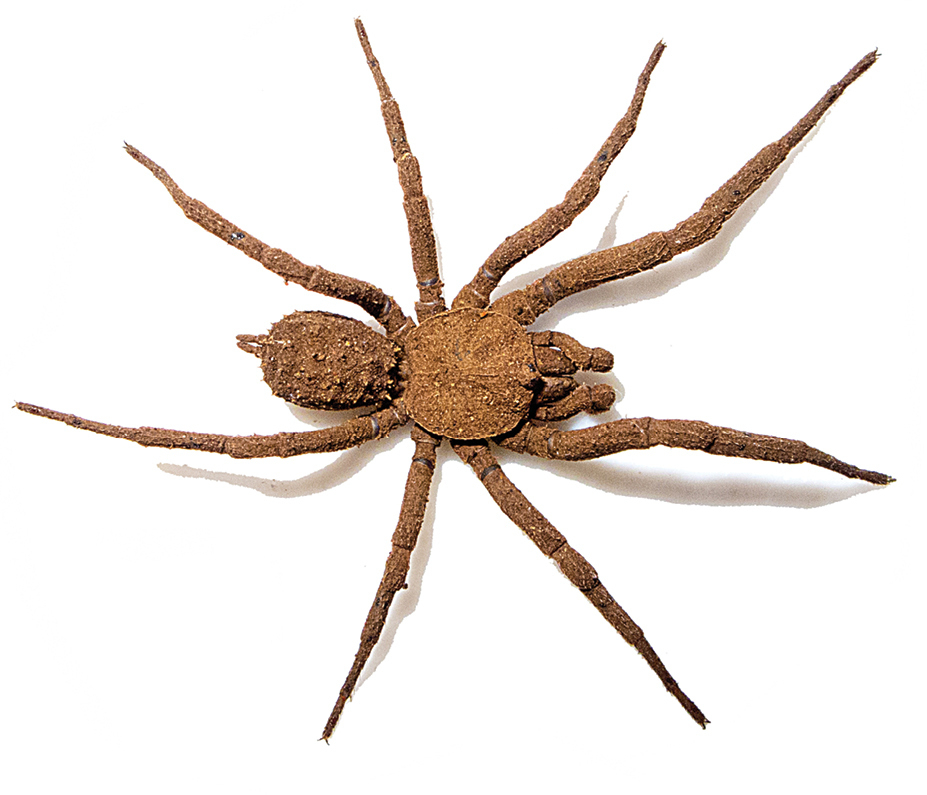
Male P. tuxtlensis, showing body encrusted with soil particles

Paratropis tuxtlensis excretes a sticky substance from glandular pores in its exoskeleton, which helps particles of soil adhere to its body. This most likely serves as a form of camouflage to conceal it from both predators and prey. When exposed, the spider remains completely motionless in order to avoid detection.
