= Trichobothria =

Vibration-detecting insect and spider 'hairs'

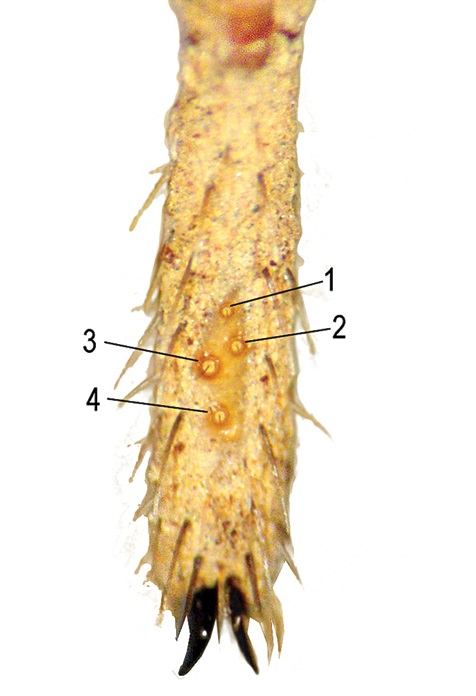
Four trichobothria on the second leg of the spider Paratropis tuxtlensis

Trichobothria (singular trichobothrium) are elongate setae ("hairs") present in arachnids, various orders of insects, and myriapods that function in the detection of airborne vibrations and currents, and electrical charge. In 1883, Friedrich Dahl observed that they were deflected by the sound waves from a violin and labelled them 'hearing hairs'.

== Morphology ==
Unlike the ordinary setae, which are tapered, the trichobothria have the same gauge throughout their length. They fit into the bottom of a broad and deep cup to which connects a membrane with extreme flexibility which adds an extraordinary mobility to them. The least air vibration is able to get them moving and to excite the small group of sensory cells which ensures their innervation.

== Distribution ==
Trichobothria are present in most orders of the Arachnida, except in Solifugae, Ricinulei and Opiliones (Grassé, 1949). Although the distribution of trichobothria on the bodies of arachnids and the trichobothrial morphology are often used by systematists (especially in Scorpiones and Pseudoscorpiones), few interordinal patterns are apparent (Shultz, 1990).
