= Anisaspoides =

Scientific classification
- Kingdom: Animalia
- Phylum: Arthropoda
- Subphylum: Chelicerata
- Class: Arachnida
- Order: Araneae
- Infraorder: Mygalomorphae
- Family: Paratropididae
- Genus: Anisaspoides; F. O. Pickard-Cambridge, 1896

Species
- See text.

Genus of spiders

Anisaspoides is a small genus of Brazilian spiders in the bald-legged spider family Paratropididae. It was first described by Frederick Octavius Pickard-Cambridge in 1896, and is found in Brazil and Colombia.

== Species ==
As of June 2026, the World Spider Catalog accepted two species:

- Anisaspoides camarita (Perafán, Galvis & Pérez-Miles, 2019) – Colombia
- Anisaspoides gigantea F. O. Pickard-Cambridge, 1896 (type species) – Brazil
