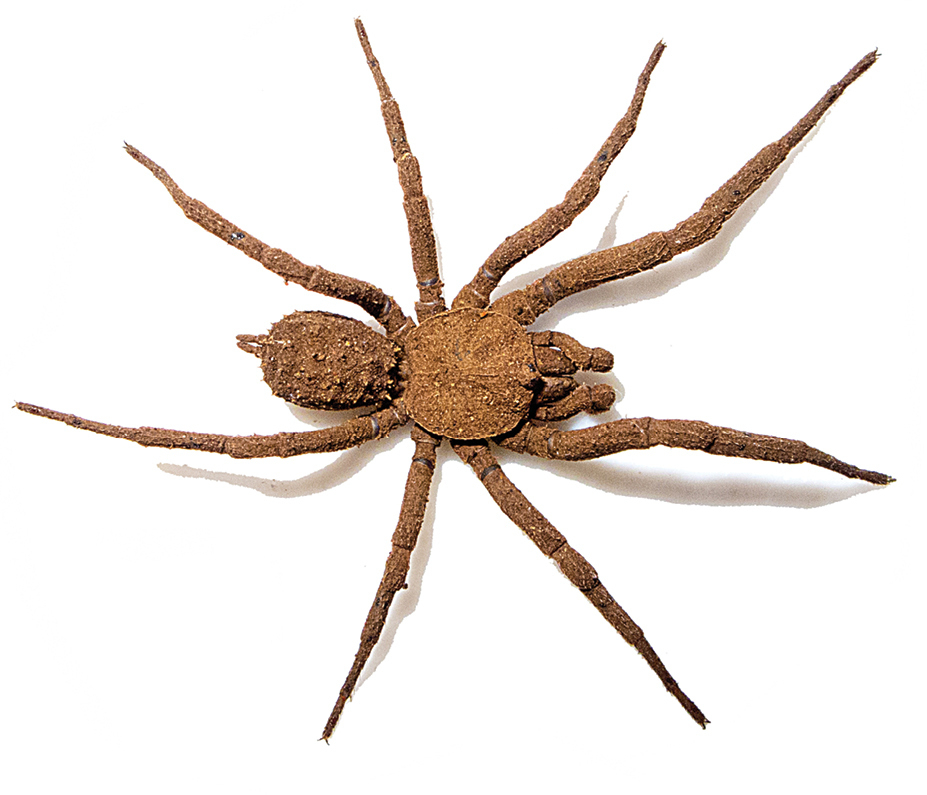
- Paratropis tuxtlensis

Scientific classification
- Kingdom: Animalia
- Phylum: Arthropoda
- Subphylum: Chelicerata
- Class: Arachnida
- Order: Araneae
- Infraorder: Mygalomorphae
- Family: Paratropididae
- Genus: Paratropis; Simon, 1889

Type species
- Paratropis scruposa Simon, 1889
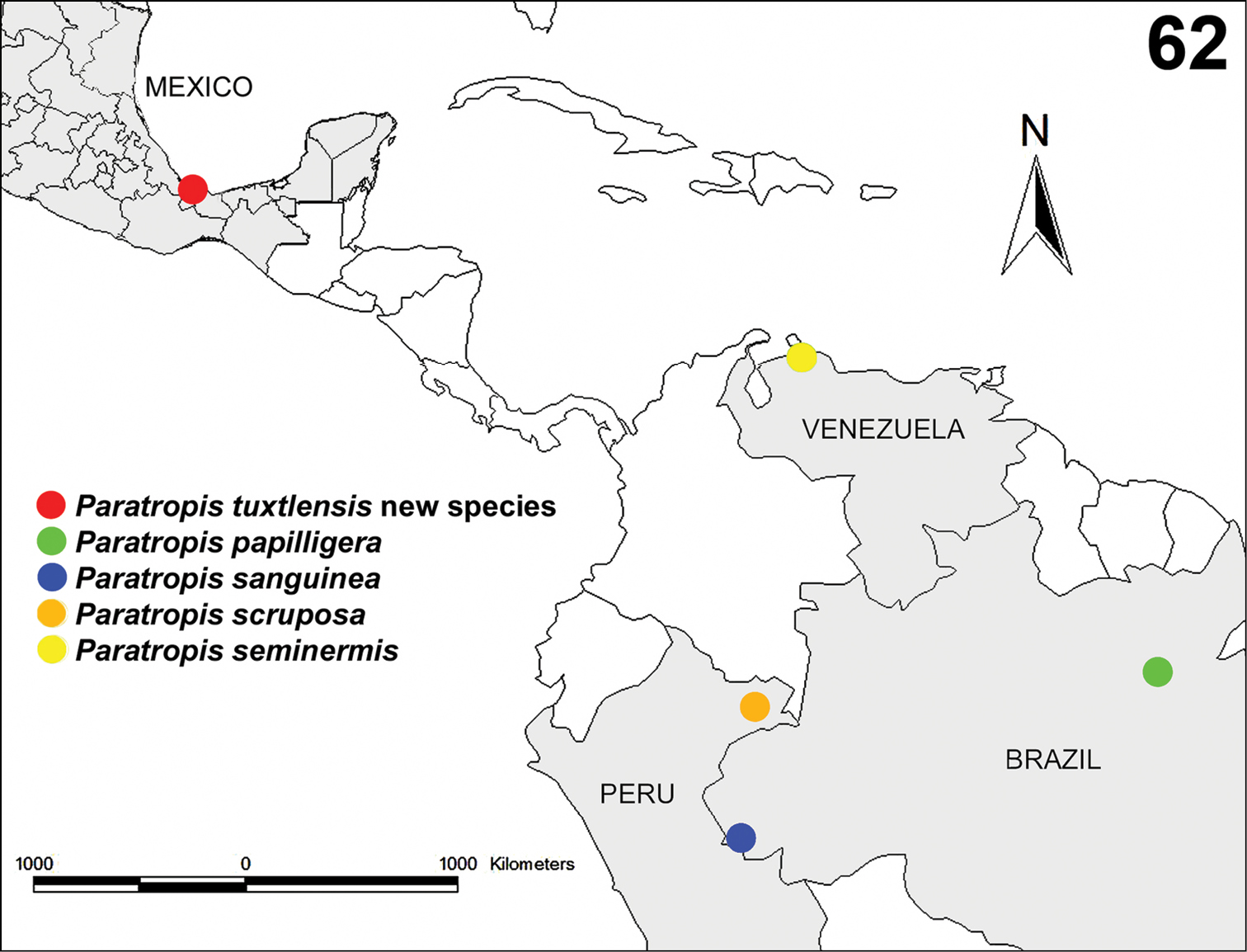
- Distribution of the five known species of Paratropis (Click to enlarge)

= Paratropis =

Genus of spiders

Paratropis is a genus of spiders in the family Paratropididae.

== Species ==
As of 2022, it contains 10 species

- Paratropis elicioi Dupérré, 2015 — Ecuador
- Paratropis florezi Perafán, Galvis & Pérez-Miles, 2019 — Colombia
- Paratropis minuscula (Almeida & de Morais, 2022) — Guyana
- Paratropis otonga Dupérré & Tapia, 2020 — Ecuador
- Paratropis papilligera F. O. Pickard-Cambridge, 1896 — Colombia, Brazil
- Paratropis pristirana Dupérré & Tapia, 2020 — Ecuador
- Paratropis sanguinea Mello-Leitão, 1923 — Brazil
- Paratropis scruposa Simon, 1889 (type) — Peru
- Paratropis seminermis Caporiacco, 1955 — Venezuela
- Paratropis tuxtlensis Valdez-Mondragón, Mendoza & Francke, 2014 — Mexico
