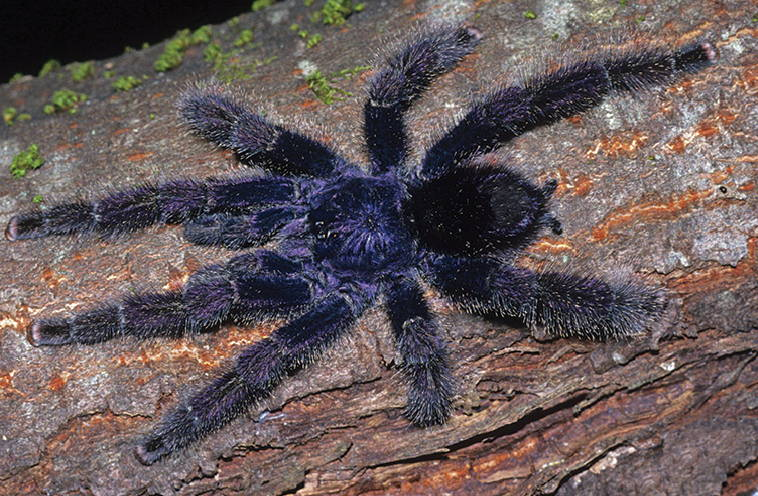
- Male Avicularia juruensis
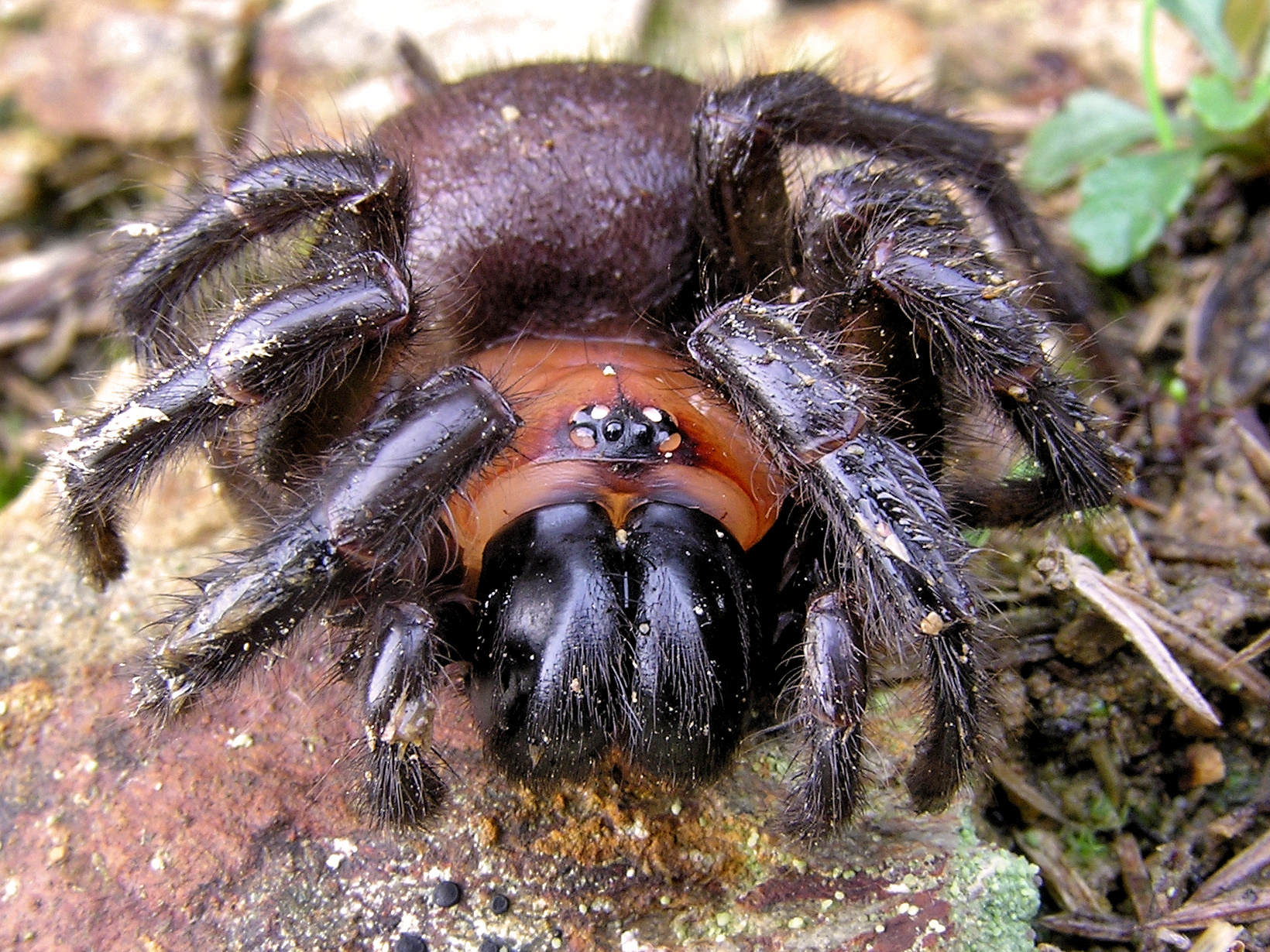
- Porrhothele antipodiana

Scientific classification
- Kingdom: Animalia
- Phylum: Arthropoda
- Subphylum: Chelicerata
- Class: Arachnida
- Order: Araneae
- Infraorder: Mygalomorphae
- Clade: Avicularioidea; Simon 1874

Families
- See text

= Avicularioidea =

Avicularioidea Temporal range: Triassic–Recent

Clade of spiders

Avicularioidea is a clade of mygalomorph spiders, one of the two main clades into which mygalomorphs are divided (the other being the Atypoidea). It has been treated at the rank of superfamily.

== Taxonomy ==
The division of the Mygalomorphae into two clades, Atypoidea and Avicularioidea, has been established in many studies. Avicularioidea has been treated as a superfamily (at one time including all mygalomorph spiders), although other authors have placed superfamilies, such as Theraphosoidea, within Avicularioidea. The name is based on the family name "Aviculariidae", a junior synonym of Theraphosidae, ultimately deriving from the genus Avicularia.

The Atypoidea retain some vestiges of abdominal segmentation in the form of dorsal tergites; the Avicularioidea lack these. Relationships within the Avicularioidea are not settled as of September 2018. Some established families have been shown not to be monophyletic. In 2018, the family Hexathelidae was split up, and three new families created within the Avicularioidea: Atracidae, Macrothelidae, and Porrhothelidae. Further changes are possible in the future.

=== Families ===
The families included in the Avicularoidea as of January 2024 are:

- Actinopodidae
- Anamidae
- Atracidae – Australian funnel-web spiders
- Barychelidae – brushed trapdoor spiders
- Bemmeridae
- Ctenizidae
- Cyrtaucheniidae – wafer trapdoor spiders
- Dipluridae – curtain-web spiders
- Entypesidae
- Euagridae
- Euctenizidae
- Halonoproctidae
- Hexathelidae
- Idiopidae – armoured trapdoor spiders
- Ischnothelidae
- Macrothelidae
- Microhexuridae
- Microstigmatidae
- Migidae – tree trapdoor spiders
- Nemesiidae
- Paratropididae – baldlegged spiders
- Porrhothelidae
- Pycnothelidae
- Stasimopidae
- Theraphosidae – tarantulas

Also included is the extinct family Fossilcalcaridae (Cretaceous) and the incertae sedis genera Cretamygale (Cretaceous) and Rosamygale (Triassic).
