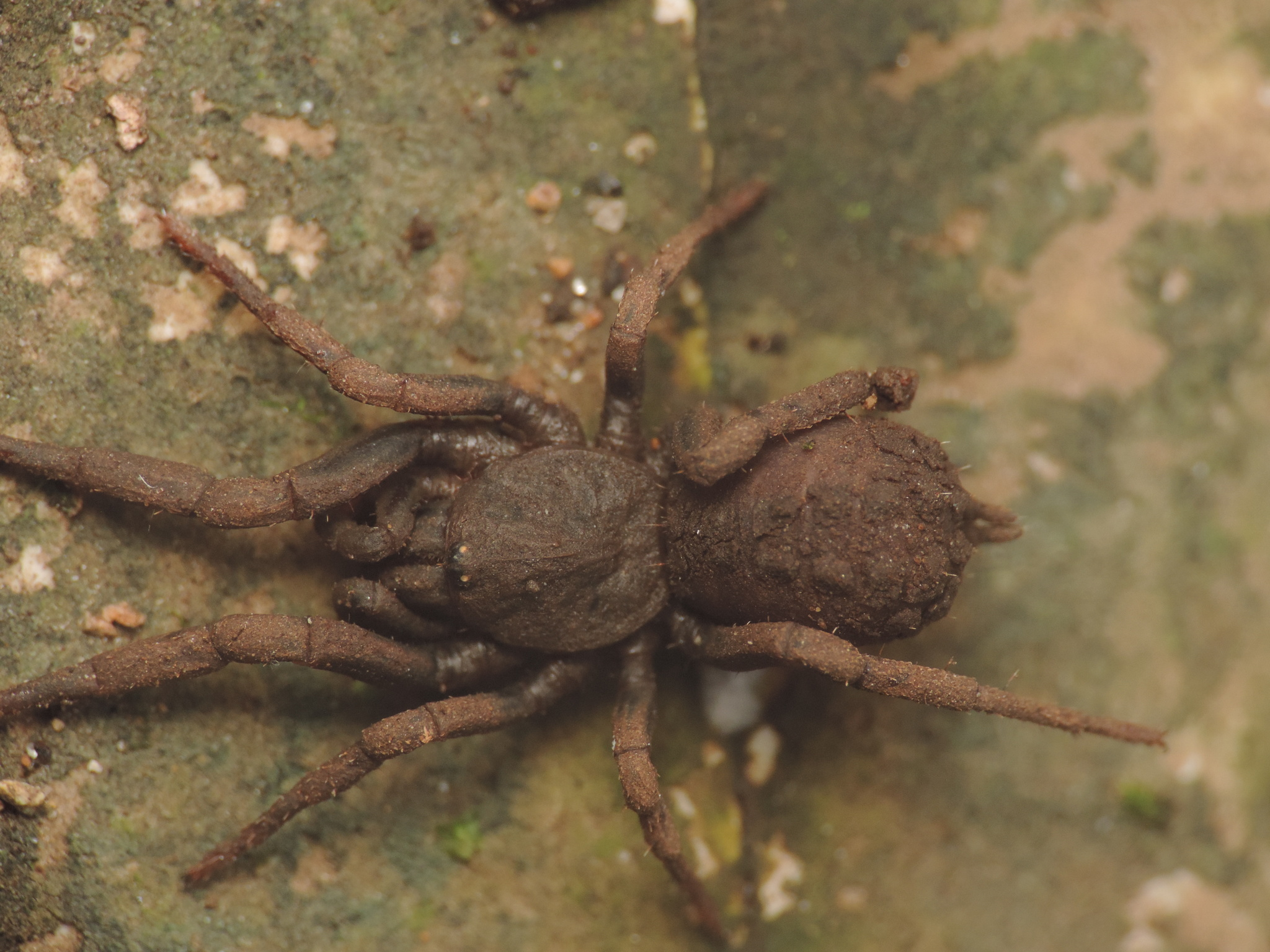
- Stormtropis paisa in Colombia
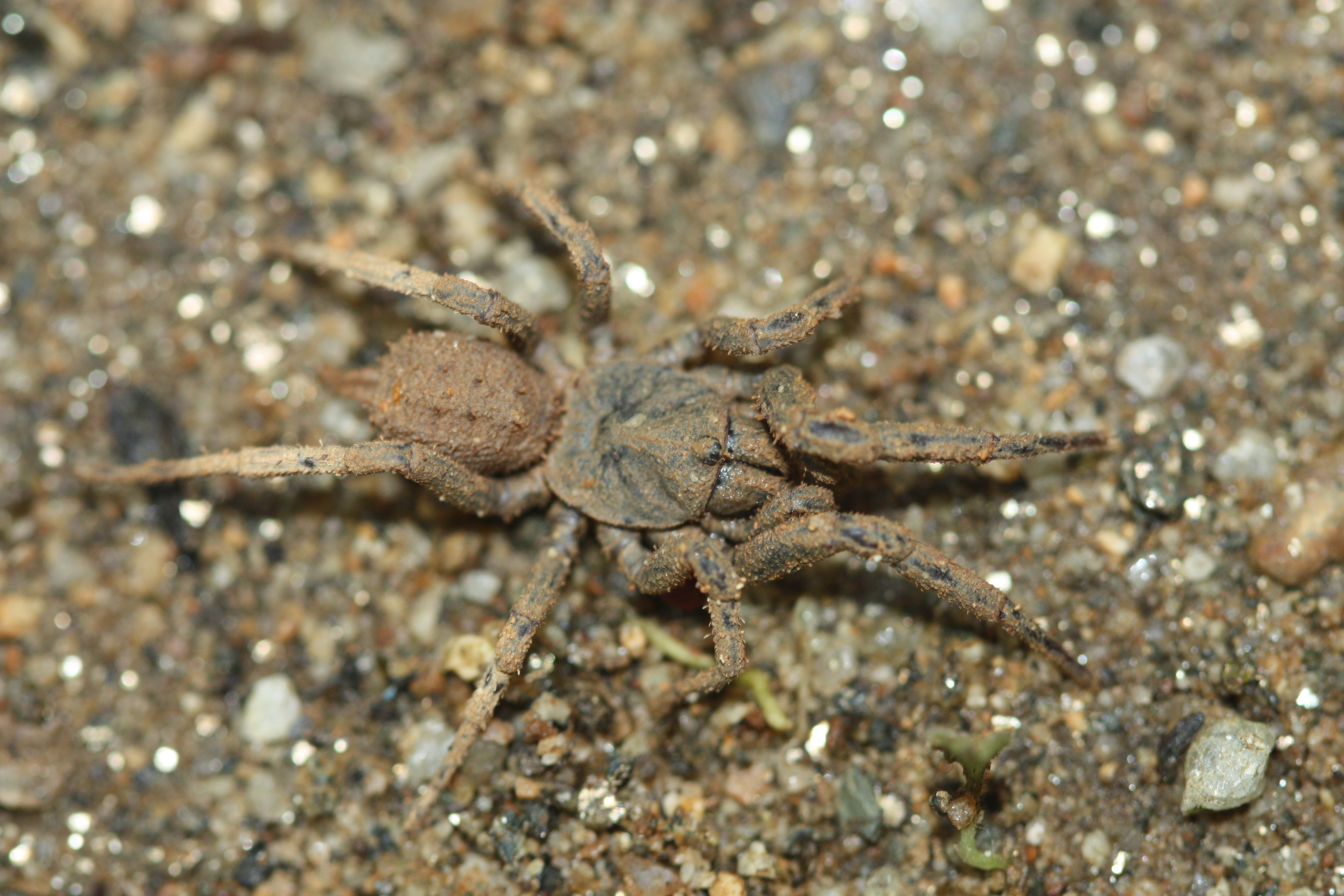
- Paratropididae sp. in Honduras

Scientific classification
- Kingdom: Animalia
- Phylum: Arthropoda
- Subphylum: Chelicerata
- Class: Arachnida
- Order: Araneae
- Infraorder: Mygalomorphae
- Clade: Avicularioidea
- Family: Paratropididae; Simon, 1889

Diversity
- 6 genera, 47 species
- blue: reported countries (WSC)

= Paratropididae =

Baldlegged spiders

Family of spiders

Paratropididae, also known as bald-legged spiders, is a small family of mygalomorph spiders first described by Eugène Simon in 1889. They are more closely related to tarantulas and allies, than to most other 'true' spiders (araneomorphs).

== Genera ==
As of June 2026, this family includes six genera and about 50 species:

- Allpanuna Peñaherrera-R., Sherwood, León-E., Ríos-Tamayo & Drolshagen, 2026 – Ecuador
- Anisaspoides F. O. Pickard-Cambridge, 1896 – Brazil, Colombia
- Inpatropis Peñaherrera-R., Sherwood, Ríos-Tamayo & Drolshagen, 2025 – Guyana
- Paratropis Simon, 1889 – Mexico, South America
- Stormtropis Perafán, Galvis & Pérez-Miles, 2019 – Brazil, Colombia, Venezuela
- Yamaratropis Peñaherrera-R., Sherwood, León-E., Ríos-Tamayo & Drolshagen, 2025 – Ecuador
