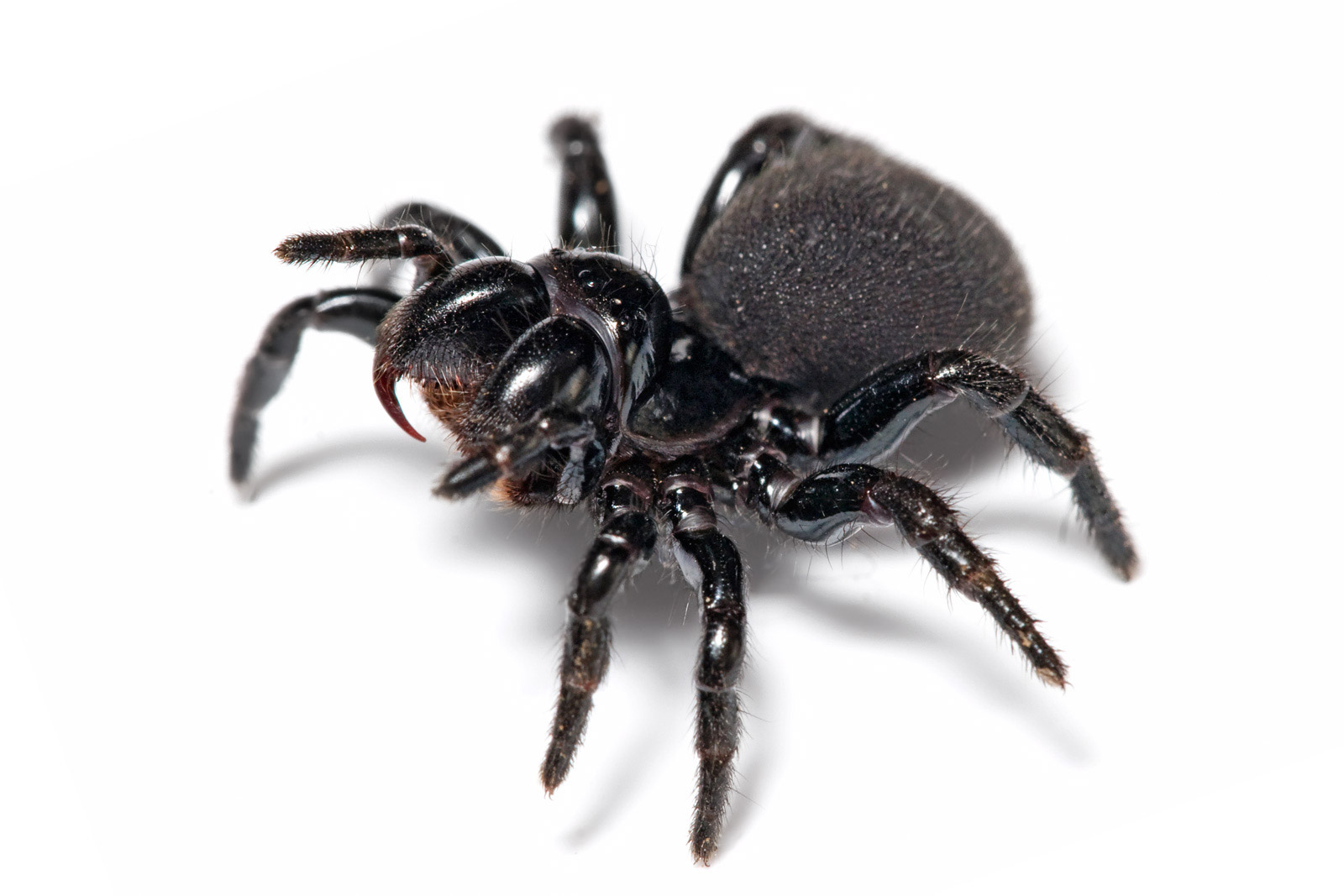
- Missulena bradleyi, a mouse spider

Scientific classification
- Kingdom: Animalia
- Phylum: Arthropoda
- Subphylum: Chelicerata
- Class: Arachnida
- Order: Araneae
- Suborder: Opisthothelae
- Infraorder: Mygalomorphae; Pocock, 1892

Subdivisions
- Atypoidea; Avicularioidea

= Mygalomorphae =

Mygalomorphae Temporal range: Anisian–Recent

Infraorder of arachnids (spiders)

The Mygalomorphae, or mygalomorphs, are an infraorder of spiders, and comprise one of three major groups of living spiders with over 3,000 species, found on all continents except Antarctica. Many members are known as trapdoor spiders due to their creation of trapdoors over their burrows. Other prominent groups include Australian funnel web spiders and tarantulas, with the latter accounting for around one third of all mygalomorphs.

== Description ==
This group of spiders comprises mostly heavy-bodied, stout-legged spiders including tarantulas, Australian funnel-web spiders, mouse spiders, and various families of spiders commonly called trapdoor spiders.

Like the "primitive" suborder of spiders Mesothelae, they have two pairs of book lungs, and downward-pointing chelicerae. Because of this, the two groups were once believed to be closely related. Later it was realised that the common ancestors of all spiders had these features (a state known as symplesiomorphy). Following the branching into the suborders of Mesothelae and Opisthothelae, the mygalomorphs retained them, while their fellow Opisthothelae members, the araneomorphs, evolved new "modern" features, including a cribellum and cross-acting fangs. Mesotheles retain the external abdominal segmentation of ancestral arachnids and have at least vestiges of four pairs of spinnerets, whereas mygalomorphs lack abdominal segmentation (like other opistotheles) and have a reduced number of spinnerets, often only two pairs.

Like spiders in general, most species of Mygalomorphae have eight eyes, one pair of principal and three pairs of secondary eyes.

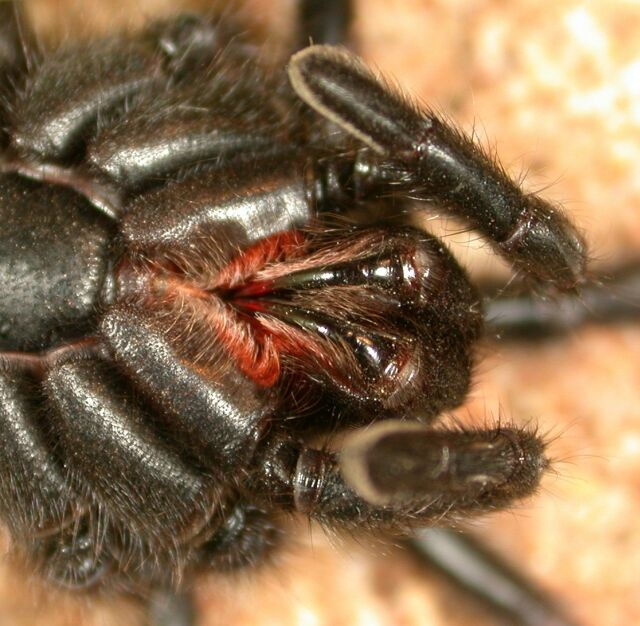
Chelicerae of a black wishbone spider (Nemesiidae)

Their chelicerae and fangs are large and powerful and have ample venom glands that lie entirely within their chelicerae. These weapons, combined with their size and strength, make Mygalomorph spiders powerful predators. Many of these spiders are well adapted to killing other large arthropods and will also sometimes kill small mammals, birds, and reptiles. Despite their fearsome appearance and reputation, most mygalomorph spiders are not harmful to humans, with the exception of the Australian funnel-web spiders, especially those of the genus Atrax.

While the world's biggest spiders are mygalomorphs – Theraphosa blondi has a body length of 10 cm (3.9 in) and a leg span of 28 cm (11 in) – some species are less than one millimeter (0.039 in) long. Mygalomorphs are capable of spinning at least slightly adhesive silk, and some build elaborate capture webs that approach a metre in diameter.

Unlike Araneomorphae, which die after about a year, Mygalomorphae can live for up to 25 years, and some do not reach maturity until they are about six years old. Some flies in the family Acroceridae that are endoparasites of mygalomorphs may remain dormant in their book lungs for as long as 10 years before beginning their development and consuming the spider.

One female trapdoor spider, first recorded in a survey in 1974 in Western Australia, is known to have lived for 43 years.

== Taxonomy ==
The name is derived from the Greek mygalē, meaning "shrew", plus morphē meaning form or shape. An older name for the group is Orthognatha, derived from the orientation of the fangs which point straight down and do not cross each other (as they do in the araneomorphs).

=== Evolution ===
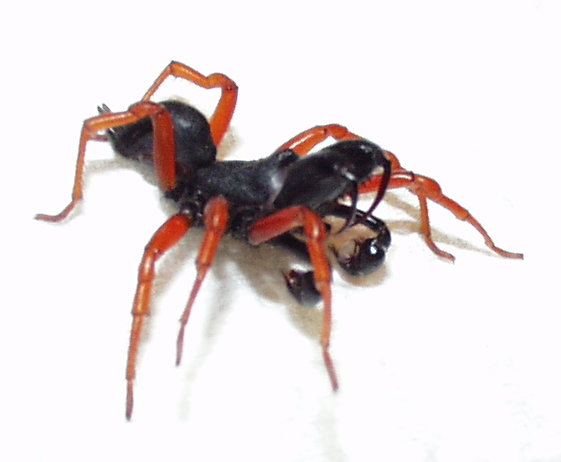
Sphodros rufipes, an atypical mygalomorph

Megarachne servinei was thought to be a giant mygalomorph from the Upper Carboniferous (about 350 million years ago), but was later found to be a eurypterid. The oldest known mygalomorph is Rosamygale grauvogeli, an avicularoid from the Triassic of northeastern France. No mygalomorphs from the Jurassic have yet been found.

The number of families and their relationships have both been undergoing substantial changes since a cladogram showing family relationships was published in 2005, with two significant studies in 2018. The division of Mygalomorphae into two superfamilies, Atypoidea and Avicularioidea, has been established in many studies. The Atypoidea retain some vestiges of abdominal segmentation in the form of dorsal tergites; the Avicularioidea lack these. Molecular phylogenetic studies undertaken between 2012 and 2017 have found somewhat different relationships within the Avicularioidea. Some families appear not to be monophyletic and further changes are possible in the future. Rosamygale belongs to Avicularioidea, based on the absence of an abdominal scutum and well-separated posterior lateral spinnerets.

Mygalomorphae tend to be highly morphologically conserved, which makes it difficult to find reliable morphological features to use for taxonomy. It has been hypothesized that because Mygalomorphae all tend to be fossorial and live in tubular webs, they are subjected to similar selective pressures, so most species should evolve in similar ways. Additionally, this may also mean that homoplasies are more likely to occur, further complicating taxonomy based on morphology.

=== Phylogeny ===
The relationships of taxa in the Mygalomorphae were restructured based on a comprehensive phylogenetic study by Opatova et al. (2020) The generic composition of the families Ctenizidae, Cyrtaucheniidae, Dipluridae, and Nemesiidae were relimited. Five subfamilies were raised to the rank of family: Anamidae, Euagridae, Ischnothelidae, Pycnothelidae, and Bemmeridae. Three new families were created: Entypesidae, Microhexuridae, and Stasimopidae. Lastly, a new subfamily, Australothelinae, was generated and placed in the family Euagridae.

The preferred cladogram from Opatova et al. (2020) is:

- Mygalomorphae
  - Atypoidea
    - Hexurellidae
    - - Mecicobothriidae
      - - Atypidae
        - - Megahexuridae
          - Antrodiaetidae
  - Avicularioidea
    - Ischnothelidae
    - - Microhexuridae
      - - - Hexathelidae
          - Euagridae
        - - Porrhothelidae
          - - Macrothelidae
            - Bipectina
              - Paratropididae
              - - - - Stasimopidae
                    - Venom Clade
                      - Atracidae
                      - Actinopodidae
                  - Domiothelina
                    - Halonoproctidae
                    - - Migidae
                      - - Idiopidae
                        - - Ctenizidae
                          - Euctenizidae
                - Crassitarsae
                  - Theraphosoidina
                    - Bemmeridae
                    - - Barychelidae
                      - Theraphosidae
                  - "Nemesioidina"
                    - Nemesiidae
                    - - Pycnothelidae
                      - - - Dipluridae
                          - Cyrtaucheniidae
                        - - Anamidae
                          - - Entypesidae
                            - Microstigmatidae

Opatova et al.'s (2020) system has been refined by Eskov et al. (2026) on the basis of a comparative study of the morphology of trichobothrial bases of all 31 currently recognized families of the Mygalomorphae.

=== Families ===
Key
Genera	1	≥2	≥10	≥100
Species	1–9	≥10	≥100	≥1000

Mygalomorphae families (Note: Unless otherwise shown, currently accepted families and counts based on the World Spider Catalog version 25.5 as of 8 February 2025. In the World Spider Catalog, "species" counts include subspecies. Assignment to sub- and infraorders based on Coddington (2005, p. 20) (when given there).)
Family	Genera	Species	Common name	Example
Atypoidea:
Antrodiaetidae	4	37	folding trapdoor spiders	Atypoides riversi
Atypidae	3	56	atypical tarantulas or purseweb spiders	Sphodros rufipes (red legged purseweb spider)
Hexurellidae	1	8		Hexurella pinea
Mecicobothriidae	1	2	dwarf tarantulas or sheet funnel-web spiders	Mecicobothrium thorelli
Megahexuridae	1	1		Megahexura fulva
Avicularioidea:
Actinopodidae	3	125		Missulena bradleyi (Eastern mouse spider)
Anamidae	10	143		Aname diversicolor (black wishbone spider)
Atracidae	3	38	Australian funnel-web spiders	Atrax robustus (Sydney funnel-web spider)
Barychelidae	39	284	brushed trapdoor spiders	Sason sundaicum
Bemmeridae	4	50		Spiroctenus personatus
Ctenizidae	2	5	cork-lid trapdoor spiders	Cteniza sauvagesi
Cyrtaucheniidae	6	109	wafer-lid trapdoor spiders	
Dipluridae	8	146	curtain-web spiders	Diplura lineata
Entypesidae	7	41		Entypesa andohahela
Euagridae	14	87		Euagrus formosanus
Euctenizidae	8	78		Aptostichus simus
Halonoproctidae	6	141		Bothriocyrtum californicum (California trapdoor spider)
Hexathelidae	7	45	(Australian) funnel-web spiders	Hexathele hochstetteri
Idiopidae	23	446	armored trapdoor spiders	Idiosoma nigrum (black rugose trapdoor spider)
Ischnothelidae	5	26		Ischnothele caudata
Macrothelidae	2	55		Macrothele calpeiana (Spanish funnel-web spider)
Microhexuridae	1	2		Microhexura montivaga (Spruce-fir moss spider)
Microstigmatidae	11	38		Envia garciai
Migidae	11	104	tree trapdoor spiders	Calathotarsus simoni
Nemesiidae	10	188		Aname atra (black wishbone spider)
Paratropididae	4	26	baldlegged spiders	Paratropis tuxtlensis
Porrhothelidae	1	5		Porrhothele antipodiana (black tunnelweb spider)
Pycnothelidae	15	140		Stanwellia hoggi
Rhytidicolidae	2	15		Fufius lucasae
Stasimopidae	1	56		Stasimopus mandelai
Theraphosidae	172	1133	tarantulas	Theraphosa blondi (Goliath birdeater)

=== Historical classification ===
In 1802, C. A. Walckenaer separated mygalomorph spiders into a separate genus, Mygale, leaving all other spiders in Aranea

In 1985, Robert Raven published a monograph of the Mygalomorphae in which he proposed an internal classification for the Mygalomorphae, based on morphological features. Opatova et al. (2020) commented "In short, much of today's classification scheme dates back to Raven (1985)". Raven used various compound ranks, such as "gigapicoorder" and "hyperpicoorder". Ignoring these unusual rank names, his classification can be shown diagrammatically:

- - Tuberculotae
    - Mecicobothrioidina
      - Mecicobothriidae
      - Microstigmatidae
    - Orthopalpae
      - Hexatheloidina
        Hexathelidae
      - Quadrithelina
        - Dipluroida
          Dipluridae
        - Crassitarsae
          - Nemesioida
            Nemesiidae
          - Theraphosoidina
            - Superfamily Theraphosoidea
              - Theraphosidae
              - Paratropididae
            - Superfamily Barycheloidea
              Barychelidae
  - Fornicephalae
    - Atypoidina
      - Atypidae
      - Antrodiaetidae
    - Rastelloidina
      - Cyrtaucheniina
        Cyrtaucheniidae
      - Domiothelina
        - Idiopina
          Idiopidae
        - Ctenizoidina
          - Superfamily Ctenizoidea
            Ctenizidae
          - Superfamily Migoidea
            - Migidae
            - Actinopodidae

Subsequent research, largely based on molecular phylogenetic studies, has not upheld some of Raven's groupings. In particular his primary division between Tuberculotae and Fornicephalae has been replaced by a very different division between Atypoidea (expanded from Raven's Atypoidina) and Avicularioidea, which has no counterpart in his system. As another example, the families Mecicobothriidae and Microstigmatidae, which Raven placed in Mecicobothrioidina (a "gigapicoorder"), are now placed very far apart in the Atypoidea and Avicularioidea respectively. Other groups, such as Crassitarsae and Domiothelina, are more recognizable, allowing for some changes in family circumscriptions.

== Distribution ==
Most members of this infraorder occur in the tropics and subtropics, but their range can extend farther north, e.g. into the southern and western regions of the United States. Only a few occur in Europe: 12 species from the families Atypidae, Nemesiidae, Ctenizidae, Macrothelidae, Theraphosidae, and Cyrtaucheniidae.

Despite their limited current range, it is suggested that the Mygalomorphae were distributed worldwide before the breakup of Pangaea.

== Sources ==
- Raven, R.J. (1985). "The spider infraorder Mygalomorphae: Cladistics and systematics". Bulletin of the American Museum of Natural History. 182: 1–180.
- Goloboff, Pablo A. (23 March 1993). A reanalysis of Mygalomorphae spider families (Araenae) (PDF) (Report). American Museum Novitates. New York, NY: American Museum of Natural History.
