= List of Cyrtaucheniidae species =

This page lists all described species of the spider family Cyrtaucheniidae accepted by the World Spider Catalog as of January 2021:

== Acontius ==
Acontius Karsch, 1879

- A. aculeatus (Simon, 1903) — Equatorial Guinea
- A. africanus (Simon, 1889) — West Africa, Congo
- A. australis (Simon, 1886) — Argentina
- A. hartmanni Karsch, 1879 (type) — Angola
- A. humiliceps (Simon, 1907) — Equatorial Guinea (Bioko)
- A. kiriba Zonstein, 2018 — Burundi
- A. lamottei (Dresco, 1972) — Ivory Coast
- A. lawrencei (Roewer, 1953) — Congo
- A. lesserti (Roewer, 1953) — Congo
- A. machadoi (Lessert, 1938) — Congo
- A. nimba Zonstein, 2018 — Guinea
- A. stercoricola (Denis, 1955) — Guinea

== Ancylotrypa ==
Ancylotrypa Simon, 1889

- A. angulata Roewer, 1953 — Congo
- A. atra Strand, 1906 — Ethiopia, Kenya
- A. barbertoni (Hewitt, 1913) — South Africa
- A. brevicornis (Hewitt, 1919) — South Africa
- A. brevipalpis (Hewitt, 1916) — South Africa
- A. brevipes (Karsch, 1879) — West Africa
- A. breyeri (Hewitt, 1919) — South Africa
- A. bulcocki (Hewitt, 1916) — South Africa
- A. coloniae (Pocock, 1902) — South Africa
- A. cornuta Purcell, 1904 — South Africa
- A. decorata (Lessert, 1938) — Congo
- A. dentata (Purcell, 1903) — South Africa
- A. dreyeri (Hewitt, 1915) — South Africa
- A. elongata Purcell, 1908 — Botswana
- A. fasciata Fage, 1936 — Kenya
- A. flaviceps (Pocock, 1898) — East Africa
- A. flavidofusula (Hewitt, 1915) — South Africa
- A. fodiens (Thorell, 1899) — Cameroon
- A. fossor Simon, 1889 (type) — Central Africa
- A. granulata (Hewitt, 1935) — Botswana
- A. kankundana Roewer, 1953 — Congo
- A. kateka (Roewer, 1953) — Congo
- A. lateralis (Purcell, 1902) — South Africa
- A. magnisigillata (Hewitt, 1914) — South Africa
- A. namaquensis (Purcell, 1908) — South Africa
- A. nigriceps (Purcell, 1902) — South Africa
- A. nuda (Hewitt, 1916) — South Africa
- A. nudipes (Hewitt, 1923) — South Africa
- A. oneili (Purcell, 1902) — South Africa
- A. pallidipes (Purcell, 1904) — South Africa
- A. parva (Hewitt, 1916) — South Africa
- A. pretoriae (Hewitt, 1913) — South Africa
- A. pusilla Purcell, 1903 — South Africa
- A. rufescens (Hewitt, 1916) — South Africa
- A. schultzei (Purcell, 1908) — Namibia
- A. sororum (Hewitt, 1916) — South Africa
- A. spinosa Simon, 1889 — South Africa
- A. tookei (Hewitt, 1919) — South Africa
- A. tuckeri Roewer, 1953 — Congo
- A. vryheidensis (Hewitt, 1915) — South Africa
- A. zebra (Simon, 1892) — South Africa
- A. zeltneri (Simon, 1904) — Ethiopia
- A. zuluensis (Lawrence, 1937) — South Africa

== Anemesia ==
Anemesia

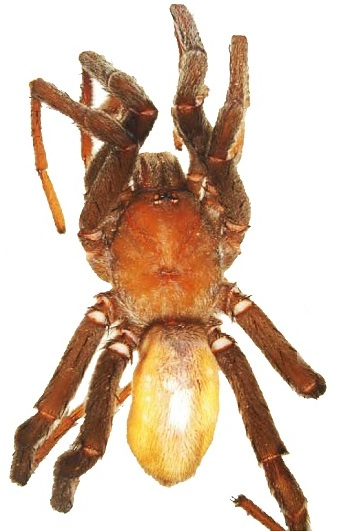
Anemesia koponeni

Anemesia Pocock, 1895

- A. andreevae Zonstein, 2018 — Uzbekistan, Tajikistan
- A. birulai (Spassky, 1937) — Turkmenistan
- A. castanea Zonstein, 2018 — Tajikistan
- A. incana Zonstein, 2001 — Tajikistan
- A. infumata Zonstein, 2018 — Tajikistan
- A. infuscata Zonstein, 2018 — Tajikistan
- A. karatauvi (Andreeva, 1968) — Tajikistan
- A. koponeni Marusik, Zamani & Mirshamsi, 2014 — Iran
- A. oxiana Zonstein, 2018 — Tajikistan
- A. pallida Zonstein, 2018 — Tajikistan
- A. parvula Zonstein, 2018 — Tajikistan
- A. pococki Zonstein, 2018 — Turkmenistan
- A. sogdiana Zonstein, 2018 — Uzbekistan, Tajikistan
- A. tubifex (Pocock, 1889) (type) — Afghanistan, Turkmenistan

== Bolostromoides ==
Bolostromoides Schiapelli & Gerschman, 1945

- B. summorum Schiapelli & Gerschman, 1945 (type) — Venezuela

== Bolostromus ==
Bolostromus

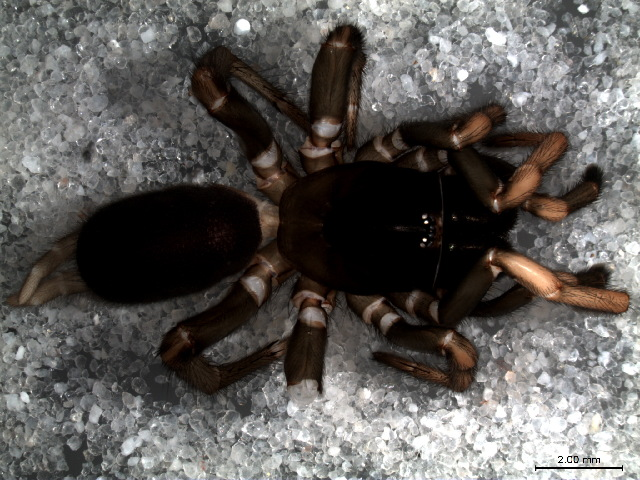
Bolostromus sp

Bolostromus Ausserer, 1875

- B. fauna (Simon, 1889) — Venezuela
- B. gaujoni (Simon, 1889) — Ecuador
- B. holguinensis Rudloff, 1996 — Cuba
- B. insularis (Simon, 1892) — St. Vincent
- B. panamanus (Petrunkevitch, 1925) — Panama
- B. pulchripes (Simon, 1889) — Venezuela
- B. riveti Simon, 1903 — Ecuador
- B. suspectus O. Pickard-Cambridge, 1911 — Uganda
- B. venustus Ausserer, 1875 (type) — Colombia
- † B. destructus Wunderlich, 1988

== Cyrtauchenius ==
Cyrtauchenius Thorell, 1869

- C. artifex (Simon, 1889) — Algeria
- C. bedeli Simon, 1881 — Algeria
- C. bicolor (Simon, 1889) — Algeria
- C. castaneiceps (Simon, 1889) — Algeria
- C. dayensis Simon, 1881 — Algeria
- C. inops (Simon, 1889) — Algeria
- C. latastei Simon, 1881 — Algeria
- C. longipalpus (Denis, 1945) — Algeria
- C. luridus Simon, 1881 — Algeria
- C. maculatus (Simon, 1889) — Algeria
- C. structor (Simon, 1889) — Algeria
- C. talpa Simon, 1891 — USA
- C. terricola (Lucas, 1846) (type) — Algeria
- C. vittatus Simon, 1881 — Algeria
