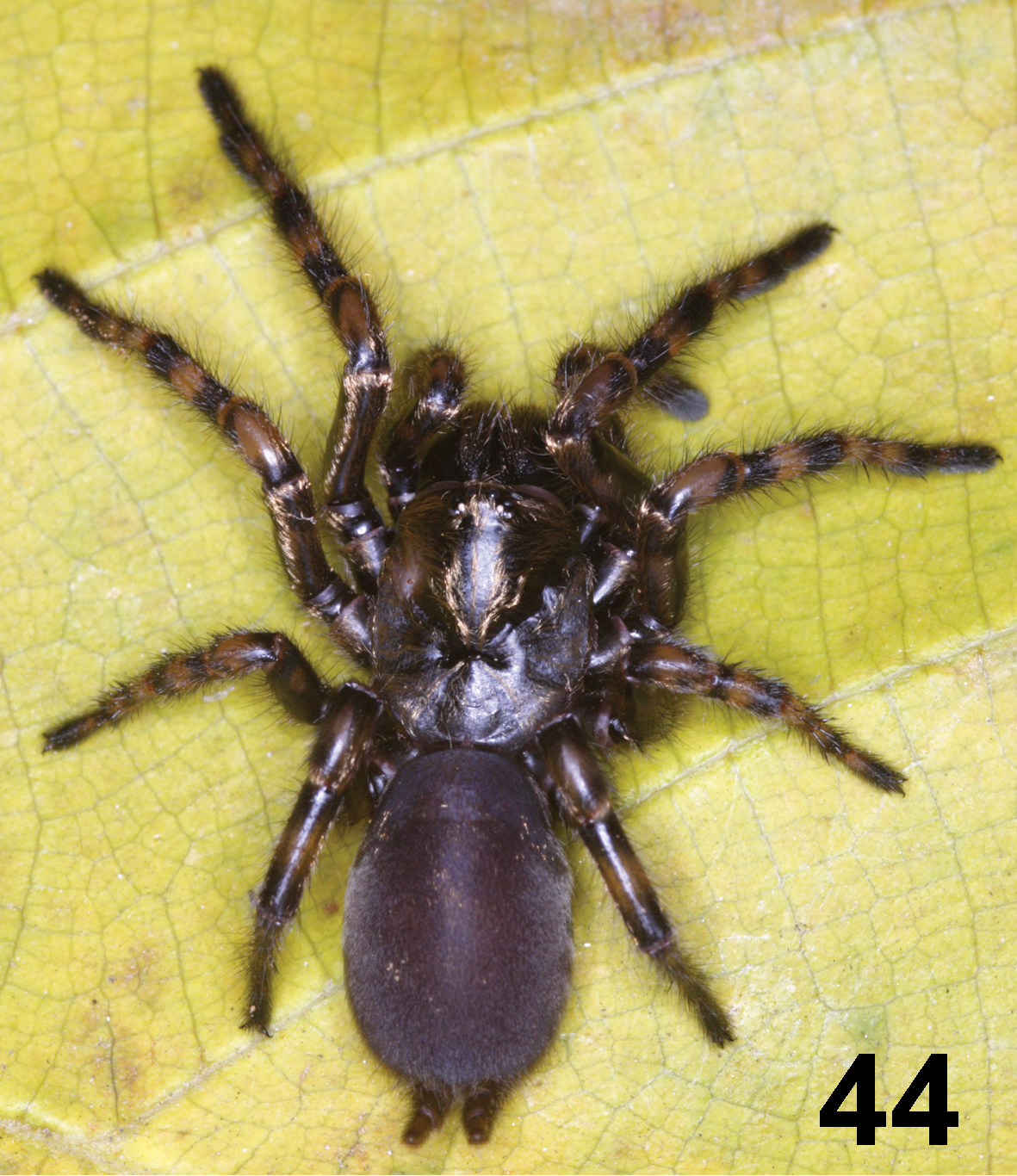
- F. lucasae, female

Scientific classification
- Kingdom: Animalia
- Phylum: Arthropoda
- Subphylum: Chelicerata
- Class: Arachnida
- Order: Araneae
- Infraorder: Mygalomorphae
- Family: Rhytidicolidae
- Genus: Fufius; Simon, 1888

Type species
- F. atramentarius Simon, 1888

Species
- 13, see text

Synonyms
- Hermorhachias Mello-Leitão, 1941; Metriura Drolshagen & Bäckstam, 2009

= Fufius (spider) =

Genus of spiders

Fufius is a genus of Central and South American Rhytidicolidae that was first described by Eugène Simon in 1888. Originally placed with the curtain web spiders, it was moved to the Cyrtaucheniidae in 1941 and to Rhytidicolidae in 2022.

== Species ==
As of September 2022 it contains thirteen species:

- Fufius albovittatus (Simon, 1891) – Brazil
- Fufius annulipes (Mello-Leitão, 1941) – Colombia
- Fufius antillensis (F. O. Pickard-Cambridge, 1899) – Trinidad
- Fufius atramentarius Simon, 1888 (type) – Central America
- Fufius auricomus (Simon, 1891) – Brazil
- Fufius candango Ortega, Nagahama, Motta & Bertani, 2013 – Brazil
- Fufius ecuadorensis (Simon, 1892) – Ecuador
- Fufius funebris Vellard, 1924 – Brazil
- Fufius jalapensis Ortega, Nagahama, Motta & Bertani, 2013 – Brazil
- Fufius lanicius (Simon, 1892) – Bolivia
- Fufius lucasae Guadanucci & Indicatti, 2004 – Brazil
- Fufius minusculus Ortega, Nagahama, Motta & Bertani, 2013 – Brazil
- Fufius striatipes (Drolshagen & Bäckstam, 2009) – Brazil
