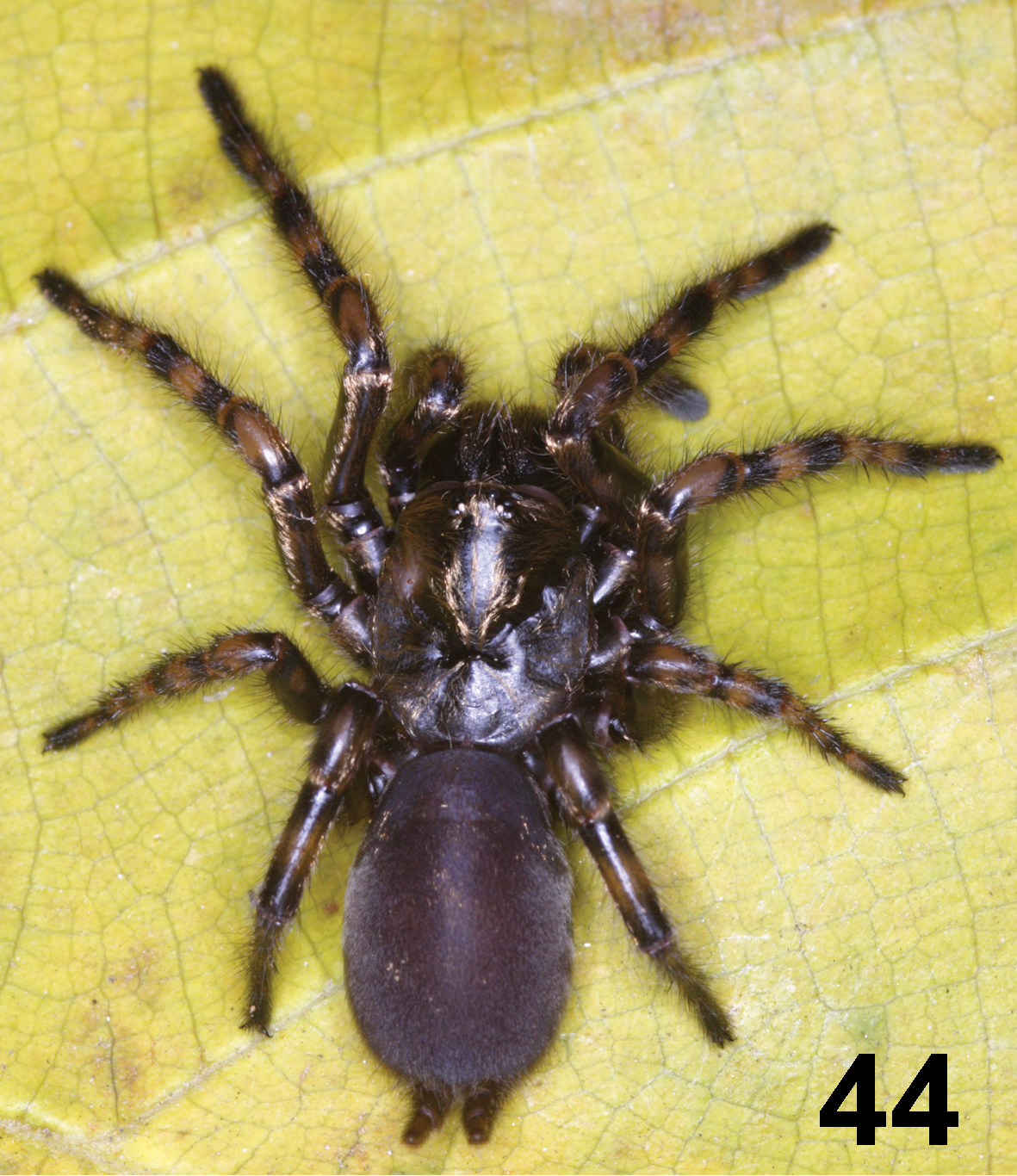
- Female

Scientific classification
- Domain: Eukaryota
- Kingdom: Animalia
- Phylum: Arthropoda
- Subphylum: Chelicerata
- Class: Arachnida
- Order: Araneae
- Infraorder: Mygalomorphae
- Family: Rhytidicolidae
- Genus: Fufius
- Species: F. lucasae

Binomial name
- Fufius lucasae Guadanucci & Indicatti, 2004

= Fufius lucasae =

Wafer trapdoor spider from Brazil

Fufius lucasae is a spider in the family Rhytidicolidae, native to Brazil. It was first described in 2004 by Guadanucci and Indicatti. The specific name lucasae honours Sylvia M. Lucas.
