= Ancylotrypa namaquensis =

Namaqua wafer-lid trapdoor spider

Conservation status
- Least Concern (IUCN 3.1)

- Least Concern (SANBI Red List)

Scientific classification
- Kingdom: Animalia
- Phylum: Arthropoda
- Subphylum: Chelicerata
- Class: Arachnida
- Order: Araneae
- Infraorder: Mygalomorphae
- Family: Cyrtaucheniidae
- Genus: Ancylotrypa
- Species: A. namaquensis

Binomial name
- Ancylotrypa namaquensis (Purcell, 1908)

Synonyms
- Pelmatorycter namaquensis Purcell, 1908

Species of spider

Ancylotrypa namaquensis, commonly known as the Namaqua wafer-lid trapdoor spider, is a species of spider of the genus Ancylotrypa. It is endemic to the Northern Cape, South Africa.

== Distribution ==
Ancylotrypa namaquensis is a Northern Cape endemic described from Steinkopf. It has been recorded from Prieska (Green Valley Nuts Estate), Steinkopf, Richtersveld Transfrontier National Park, and Benfontein Game Reserve, at elevations between 250 and 1,172 metres (820 and 3,850 ft) above sea level.

== Habitat and ecology ==
Ground dwellers that live in silk-lined burrows sampled from the Desert, Nama and Succulent Karoo biomes.

== Description ==
Only the male has been described for this species.

== Conservation ==
Listed as Least Concern on the South African Red List. Although identification of the species is still problematic and more sampling is needed to collect the female, the species appears to be widespread. It is protected in Richtersveld Transfrontier National Park and Benfontein Game Reserve.
