= Ancylotrypa spinosa =

Spiny wafer-lid trapdoor spider

Scientific classification
- Kingdom: Animalia
- Phylum: Arthropoda
- Subphylum: Chelicerata
- Class: Arachnida
- Order: Araneae
- Infraorder: Mygalomorphae
- Family: Cyrtaucheniidae
- Genus: Ancylotrypa
- Species: A. spinosa

Binomial name
- Ancylotrypa spinosa Simon, 1889

Species of spider

Ancylotrypa spinosa, commonly known as the spiny wafer-lid trapdoor spider, is a species of spider of the genus Ancylotrypa. It is endemic to the Eastern Cape, South Africa.

== Distribution ==
Ancylotrypa spinosa is an Eastern Cape endemic described from Port Elizabeth. It is known from Port Elizabeth and Bamboesberg, W Sterkstroom (Wilgerskloof Farm), at elevations between 7 and 1478 meters above sea level.

== Habitat and ecology ==
Ground dwellers that live in silk-lined burrows. The species has been sampled from the Grassland and Thicket biomes.

== Description ==
Both males and females have been described for this species.

== Conservation ==
Listed as Data Deficient on the South African Red List. Its status remains obscure and more sampling is needed to determine its present range.
