= Ancylotrypa zuluensis =

Zululand wafer-lid trapdoor spider

Scientific classification
- Kingdom: Animalia
- Phylum: Arthropoda
- Subphylum: Chelicerata
- Class: Arachnida
- Order: Araneae
- Infraorder: Mygalomorphae
- Family: Cyrtaucheniidae
- Genus: Ancylotrypa
- Species: A. zuluensis

Binomial name
- Ancylotrypa zuluensis (Lawrence, 1937)

Synonyms
- Pelmatorycter zuluensis Lawrence, 1937

Species of spider

Ancylotrypa zuluensis, commonly known as the Zululand wafer-lid trapdoor spider, is a species of spider of the genus Ancylotrypa. It is endemic to KwaZulu-Natal, South Africa.

== Distribution ==
Ancylotrypa zuluensis is a KwaZulu-Natal endemic described from Hluhluwe Game Reserve. It has been recorded from Hluhluwe Game Reserve, Richards Bay, and Sodwana Bay National Park, at elevations between 29 and 119 meters above sea level.

== Habitat and ecology ==
Free-living ground dweller that lives in silk-lined burrows. The species has been sampled from the Savanna and Indian Ocean Coastal Belt biomes.

== Description ==
Only the male has been described for this species.

== Conservation ==
Listed as Data Deficient on the South African Red List for taxonomic reasons. The species is known only from the male. More sampling is needed to collect the female and determine the species' range. The species is protected in Hluhluwe Game Reserve and Sodwana Bay National Park.
