= Ancylotrypa pallidipes =

Matjiesfontein wafer-lid trapdoor spider

Scientific classification
- Kingdom: Animalia
- Phylum: Arthropoda
- Subphylum: Chelicerata
- Class: Arachnida
- Order: Araneae
- Infraorder: Mygalomorphae
- Family: Cyrtaucheniidae
- Genus: Ancylotrypa
- Species: A. pallidipes

Binomial name
- Ancylotrypa pallidipes (Purcell, 1904)

Synonyms
- Pelmatorycter pallidipes Purcell, 1904

Species of spider

Ancylotrypa pallidipes, commonly known as the Matjiesfontein wafer-lid trapdoor spider, is a species of spider of the genus Ancylotrypa. It is endemic to the Western Cape, South Africa.

== Distribution ==
A. pallidipes is a Western Cape endemic known only from the type locality of Matjiesfontein, at an elevation of 912 meters above sea level.

== Habitat and ecology ==
Free-living ground dwellers that live in silk-lined burrows. The species has been sampled from the Nama Karoo biome.

== Description ==
Only the male has been described for this species.

== Conservation ==
Listed as Data Deficient on the South African Red List for taxonomic reasons. The species is known only from the holotype male. More sampling is needed to collect the female and determine the species' range.
