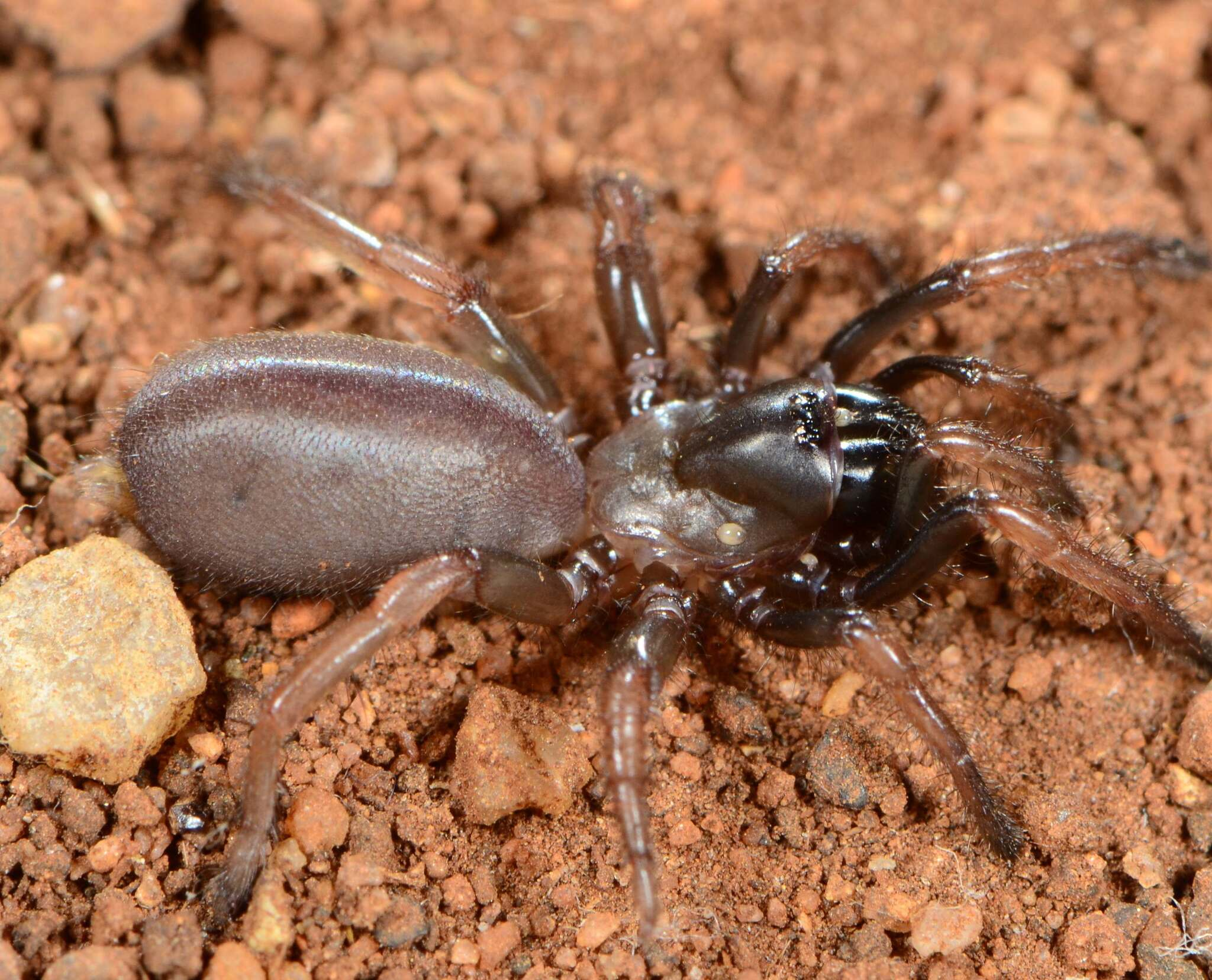
- adult female
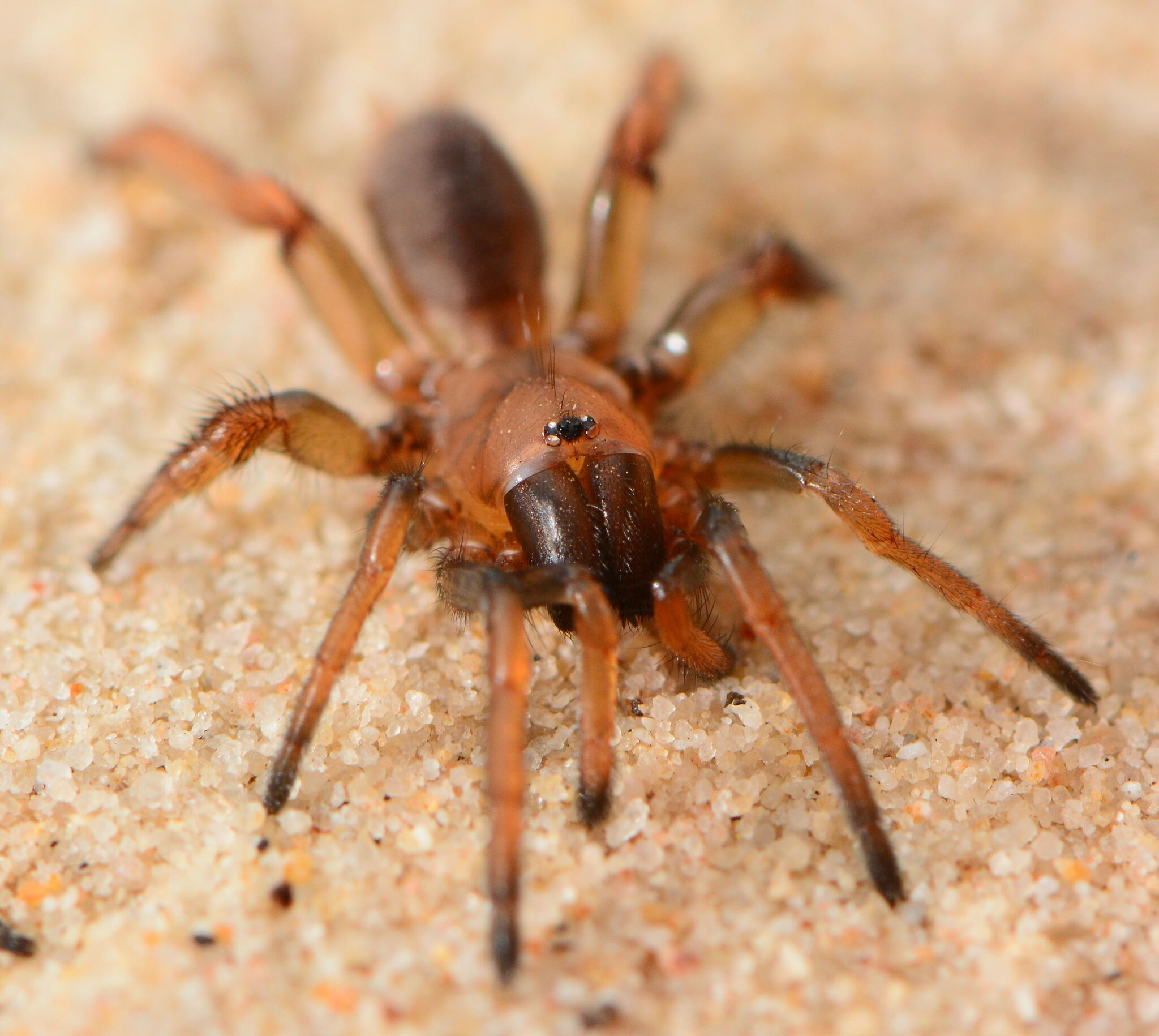
- juvenile female

Conservation status
- Least Concern (SANBI Red List)

Scientific classification
- Kingdom: Animalia
- Phylum: Arthropoda
- Subphylum: Chelicerata
- Class: Arachnida
- Order: Araneae
- Infraorder: Mygalomorphae
- Family: Cyrtaucheniidae
- Genus: Ancylotrypa
- Species: A. brevipalpis

Binomial name
- Ancylotrypa brevipalpis (Hewitt, 1916)

Synonyms
- Pelmatorycter brevipalpis Hewitt, 1916

= Ancylotrypa brevipalpis =

Short palp wafer-lid trapdoor spider

Species of spider

Ancylotrypa brevipalpis, commonly known as the short palp wafer-lid trapdoor spider, is a species of spider of the genus Ancylotrypa. It is endemic to South Africa.

== Distribution ==
Ancylotrypa brevipalpis has a wide distribution across five South African provinces: Gauteng, KwaZulu-Natal, Limpopo, Mpumalanga, and North West. The species occurs at elevations ranging from 275 to 1922 meters above sea level.

== Habitat and ecology ==
Ground dwellers that live in silk-lined burrows, typically constructed underneath large rocks. Males wander in search of females and are sometimes found in swimming pools. The species has been sampled from both Savanna and Grassland biomes.

== Conservation ==
The species is listed as Least Concern on the South African Red List due to its wide geographical range. It is protected in numerous reserves including Roodeplaatdam Nature Reserve, Suikerbosrand Nature Reserve, Ophathe Game Reserve, Mosdene Nature Reserve, Nylsvley Nature Reserve, Polokwane Nature Reserve, Luvhondo Nature Reserve, Blouberg Nature Reserve, Entabeni State Forest, and Kruger National Park.
