= Ancylotrypa barbertoni =

Scientific classification
- Kingdom: Animalia
- Phylum: Arthropoda
- Subphylum: Chelicerata
- Class: Arachnida
- Order: Araneae
- Infraorder: Mygalomorphae
- Family: Cyrtaucheniidae
- Genus: Ancylotrypa
- Species: A. barbertoni

Binomial name
- Ancylotrypa barbertoni (Hewitt, 1913)

Synonyms
- Pelmatorycter barbertoni Hewitt, 1913

Species of spider

Ancylotrypa barbertoni is a species of spider of the genus Ancylotrypa. It is endemic to South Africa.

== Distribution ==
Ancylotrypa barbertoni is a South African endemic, known from Limpopo and Mpumalanga provinces. It has been recorded from Kruger National Park (Letaba Camp), Barberton, and Two Rivers, occurring at elevations between 238 and 941 meters above sea level.

== Habitat and ecology ==
This species is a free-living ground dweller that lives in silk-lined burrows. It has been sampled from the Savanna biome.

== Description ==
Both males and females have been described for this species.

== Conservation ==
The species is listed as Data Deficient on the South African Red List. While it is protected in Kruger National Park, more sampling is needed to determine its present range and conservation status.
