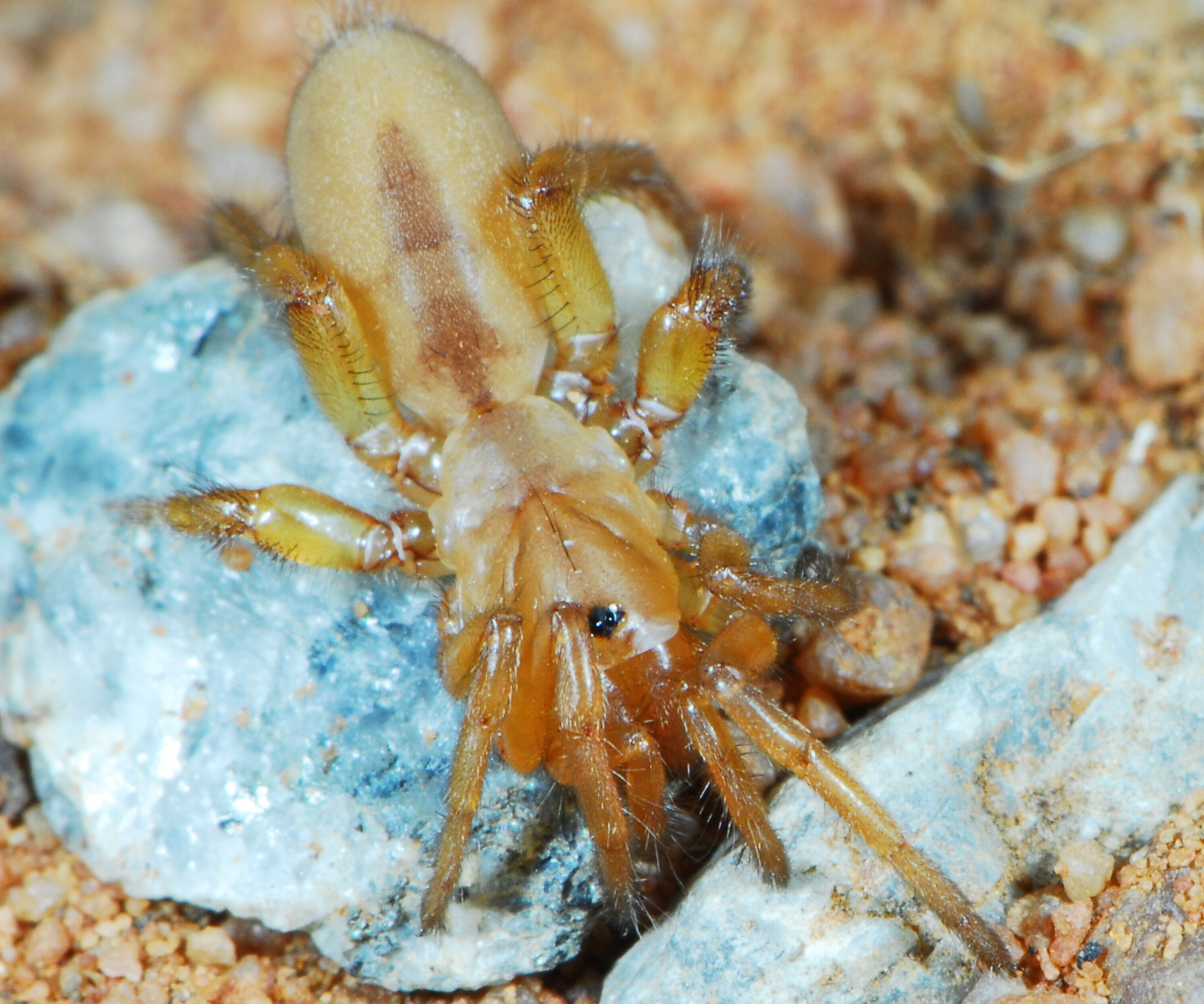
- Female juvenile

Scientific classification
- Kingdom: Animalia
- Phylum: Arthropoda
- Subphylum: Chelicerata
- Class: Arachnida
- Order: Araneae
- Infraorder: Mygalomorphae
- Family: Cyrtaucheniidae
- Genus: Ancylotrypa
- Species: A. pusilla

Binomial name
- Ancylotrypa pusilla (Purcell, 1903)

= Ancylotrypa pusilla =

Hanover wafer-lid trapdoor spider

Species of spider

Ancylotrypa pusilla, commonly known as the Hanover wafer-lid trapdoor spider, is a species of spider of the genus Ancylotrypa. It is endemic to the Northern Cape, South Africa. It has been recorded from Green Valley Nuts Estate (Prieska), Hanover, Vlagkop (8 km N Hanover), Tswalu Kalahari Reserve, and Benfontein Nature Reserve, at elevations between 950 and 1358 meters above sea level. They have been sampled from three biomes as well as pistachio orchards. It is listed as Data Deficient on the South African Red List for taxonomic reasons, as identification of the species is still problematic. But the species is protected in Tswalu Kalahari Game Reserve and Benfontein Nature Reserve.

== Description ==
Both sexes have been described for this species. They are ground dwelling and live in silk-lined burrows. Most of their body is pale and yellowish, which is broken by some olive-brown coloration in the middle of the carapace and a central olive-brown stripe in the middle of their abdomen. Their abdomen also has long spiniform setae, especially at the base. Their pedipalps are not spined. Their total length is around 9 inches, their carapace measuring 3.75 inches.
