= Ancylotrypa vryheidensis =

Vryheid wafer-lid trapdoor spider

Conservation status
- Least Concern (SANBI Red List)

Scientific classification
- Kingdom: Animalia
- Phylum: Arthropoda
- Subphylum: Chelicerata
- Class: Arachnida
- Order: Araneae
- Infraorder: Mygalomorphae
- Family: Cyrtaucheniidae
- Genus: Ancylotrypa
- Species: A. vryheidensis

Binomial name
- Ancylotrypa vryheidensis (Hewitt, 1915)

Synonyms
- Pelmatorycter vryheidensis Hewitt, 1915

Species of spider

Ancylotrypa vryheidensis, commonly known as the Vryheid wafer-lid trapdoor spider, is a species of spider of the genus Ancylotrypa. It is endemic to KwaZulu-Natal, South Africa.

== Distribution ==
Ancylotrypa vryheidensis is a KwaZulu-Natal endemic described from Vryheid. It has been recorded from Vryheid, Ndumo Game Reserve, Ngome State Forest, and Tembe Elephant Park, at elevations between 47 and 1154 meters above sea level. The species was abundant (>300 individuals) in Ngome State Forest.

== Habitat and ecology ==
Ground dweller that lives in silk-lined burrows. Males wander in search of females and have been sampled in pitfall traps in the Savanna biome. In Ngome State Forest, it was also sampled from pine plantations, demonstrating its ability to survive in agroforestry plantations.

== Description ==
Only the female has been described for this species.

== Conservation ==
Listed as Least Concern on the South African Red List. The majority of known subpopulations are from protected areas and the species is able to survive in agroforestry plantations. It is protected in Ndumo Game Reserve, Ngome State Forest, and Tembe Elephant Park.
