= Ancylotrypa magnisigillata =

Kokstad wafer-lid trapdoor spider

Scientific classification
- Kingdom: Animalia
- Phylum: Arthropoda
- Subphylum: Chelicerata
- Class: Arachnida
- Order: Araneae
- Infraorder: Mygalomorphae
- Family: Cyrtaucheniidae
- Genus: Ancylotrypa
- Species: A. magnisigillata

Binomial name
- Ancylotrypa magnisigillata (Hewitt, 1914)

Synonyms
- Pelmatorycter magnisigillatus Hewitt, 1914

Species of spider

Ancylotrypa magnisigillata, commonly known as the Kokstad wafer-lid trapdoor spider, is a species of spider of the genus Ancylotrypa. It is endemic to South Africa.

== Distribution ==
Ancylotrypa magnisigillata is known from the Eastern Cape (Sunday's River Valley, Uitenhage) and KwaZulu-Natal (Kokstad, the type locality), at an elevation of 1,325 meters above sea level.

== Habitat and ecology ==
Ground dwellers that live in silk-lined burrows. Males wander and are sampled from pitfall traps in the Grassland biome.

== Description ==
Only the female has been described for this species.

== Conservation ==
Listed as Data Deficient on the South African Red List for taxonomic reasons. The species is known only from the holotype female. More sampling is needed to collect the male and determine its range.
