= Ancylotrypa cornuta =

Crowned wafer-lid trapdoor spider

Scientific classification
- Kingdom: Animalia
- Phylum: Arthropoda
- Subphylum: Chelicerata
- Class: Arachnida
- Order: Araneae
- Infraorder: Mygalomorphae
- Family: Cyrtaucheniidae
- Genus: Ancylotrypa
- Species: A. cornuta

Binomial name
- Ancylotrypa cornuta Purcell, 1904

Synonyms
- Pelmatorycter crudeni Hewitt, 1915

Species of spider

Ancylotrypa cornuta, commonly known as the crowned wafer-lid trapdoor spider or Dunbrody wafer-lid trapdoor spider, is a species of spider of the genus Ancylotrypa. It is endemic to the Eastern Cape, South Africa.

== Distribution ==
Ancylotrypa cornuta is an Eastern Cape endemic described from Dunbrody. It has been recorded from Dunbrody, Alicedale, Addo Elephant National Park, and Adries Vosloo Nature Reserve, at an elevation of 283 meters above sea level.

== Habitat and ecology ==
Free-living ground dweller that lives in silk-lined burrows. Males wander in search of females. The species has been sampled from the Thicket biome.

== Description ==
Both males and females have been described for this species.

== Conservation ==
Listed as Data Deficient on the South African Red List. The species is protected in Addo Elephant National Park and Adries Vosloo Nature Reserve. Identification of the species is still problematic and more sampling is needed to determine its range.
