= Ancylotrypa dreyeri =

Dreyer's wafer-lid trapdoor spider

Scientific classification
- Kingdom: Animalia
- Phylum: Arthropoda
- Subphylum: Chelicerata
- Class: Arachnida
- Order: Araneae
- Infraorder: Mygalomorphae
- Family: Cyrtaucheniidae
- Genus: Ancylotrypa
- Species: A. dreyeri

Binomial name
- Ancylotrypa dreyeri (Hewitt, 1915)

Synonyms
- Pelmatorycter dreyeri Hewitt, 1915

Species of spider

Ancylotrypa dreyeri, commonly known as Dreyer's wafer-lid trapdoor spider, is a species of spider of the genus Ancylotrypa. It is endemic to the Free State, South Africa.

== Distribution ==
Ancylotrypa dreyeri is a Free State endemic described from Bloemfontein. It is known from Bloemfontein, Clocolan (Mpetsane Conservation Estate), Free State National Botanical Gardens, and Amanzi Private Game Reserve, occurring at elevations between 1385 and 1599 meters above sea level.

== Habitat and ecology ==
Ground dwellers that live in silk-lined burrows made in the Grassland biome.

== Description ==
Both males and females have been described for this species.

== Conservation ==
Listed as Data Deficient on the South African Red List. The species is protected in Mpetsane Conservation Estate, Free State National Botanical Gardens in Bloemfontein, and Amanzi Private Game Reserve.
