= Ancylotrypa tookei =

Peddie wafer-lid trapdoor spider

Scientific classification
- Kingdom: Animalia
- Phylum: Arthropoda
- Subphylum: Chelicerata
- Class: Arachnida
- Order: Araneae
- Infraorder: Mygalomorphae
- Family: Cyrtaucheniidae
- Genus: Ancylotrypa
- Species: A. tookei

Binomial name
- Ancylotrypa tookei (Hewitt, 1919)

Synonyms
- Pelmatorycter tookei Hewitt, 1919

Species of spider

Ancylotrypa tookei, commonly known as the Peddie wafer-lid trapdoor spider, is a species of spider of the genus Ancylotrypa. It is endemic to the Eastern Cape, South Africa.

== Distribution ==
Ancylotrypa tookei is an Eastern Cape endemic described from Peddie. The species is known from Peddie and Port Elizabeth, at elevations between 7 and 349 meters above sea level.

== Habitat and ecology ==
Ground dwellers that live in silk-lined burrows. The males are sampled from the Savanna and Thicket biomes.

== Description ==
Only the male has been described for this species.

== Conservation ==
Listed as Data Deficient on the South African Red List for taxonomic reasons. The species is rare and more sampling is needed to collect the female and determine their range.
