= Ancylotrypa bulcocki =

Eastern Cape wafer-lid trapdoor spider

Scientific classification
- Kingdom: Animalia
- Phylum: Arthropoda
- Subphylum: Chelicerata
- Class: Arachnida
- Order: Araneae
- Infraorder: Mygalomorphae
- Family: Cyrtaucheniidae
- Genus: Ancylotrypa
- Species: A. bulcocki

Binomial name
- Ancylotrypa bulcocki (Hewitt, 1916)

Synonyms
- Pelmatorycter bulcocki Hewitt, 1916

Species of spider

Ancylotrypa bulcocki is a species of spider of the genus Ancylotrypa. It is endemic to the Eastern Cape, South Africa.

== Distribution ==
Ancylotrypa bulcocki is an Eastern Cape endemic known only from the type locality of Ngqeleni, at an elevation of 633 meters above sea level.

== Habitat and ecology ==
Lives in silk-lined burrows. The species has been sampled from the Savanna biome.

== Description ==
Both males and females have been described for this species.

== Conservation ==
Listed as Data Deficient on the South African Red List. The species is known only from the types and more sampling is needed to determine its present range.
