= Ancylotrypa parva =

Wafer-lid trapdoor spider

Scientific classification
- Kingdom: Animalia
- Phylum: Arthropoda
- Subphylum: Chelicerata
- Class: Arachnida
- Order: Araneae
- Infraorder: Mygalomorphae
- Family: Cyrtaucheniidae
- Genus: Ancylotrypa
- Species: A. parva

Binomial name
- Ancylotrypa parva (Hewitt, 1916)

Synonyms
- Pelmatorycter parvus Hewitt, 1916

Species of spider

Ancylotrypa parva is a species of spider of the genus Ancylotrypa. It is endemic to the Eastern Cape, South Africa.

== Distribution ==
Ancylotrypa parva is an Eastern Cape endemic known only from the type locality of Alicedale, at an elevation of 283 meters above sea level.

== Habitat and ecology ==
Ground dweller that lives in silk-lined burrows. The species has been sampled from the Nama Karoo biome.

== Description ==
Only the male has been described for this species.

== Conservation ==
Listed as Data Deficient on the South African Red List for taxonomic reasons. The species is known only from the holotype male. More sampling is needed to collect the female and determine the species' range.
