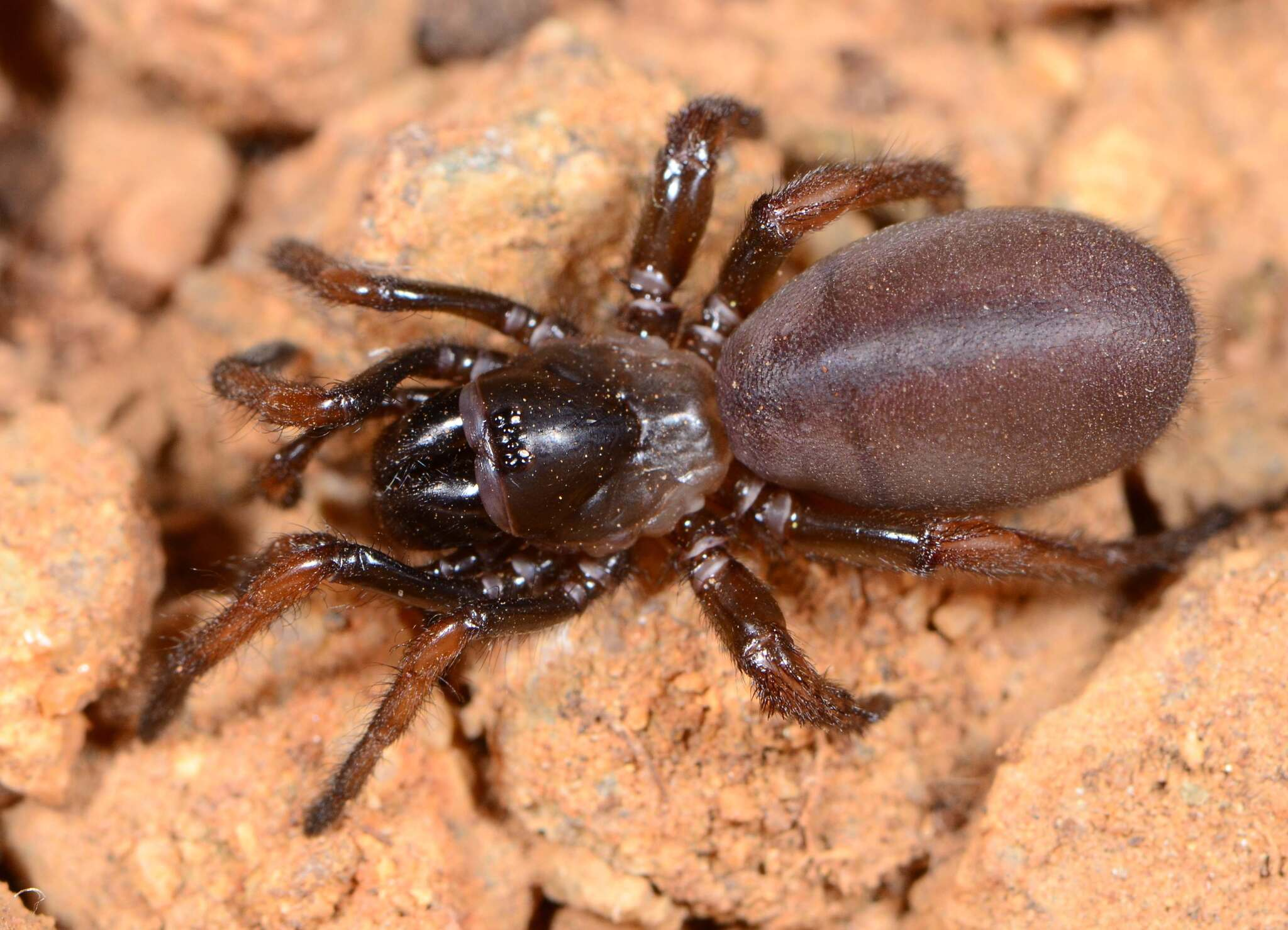
- juvenile female
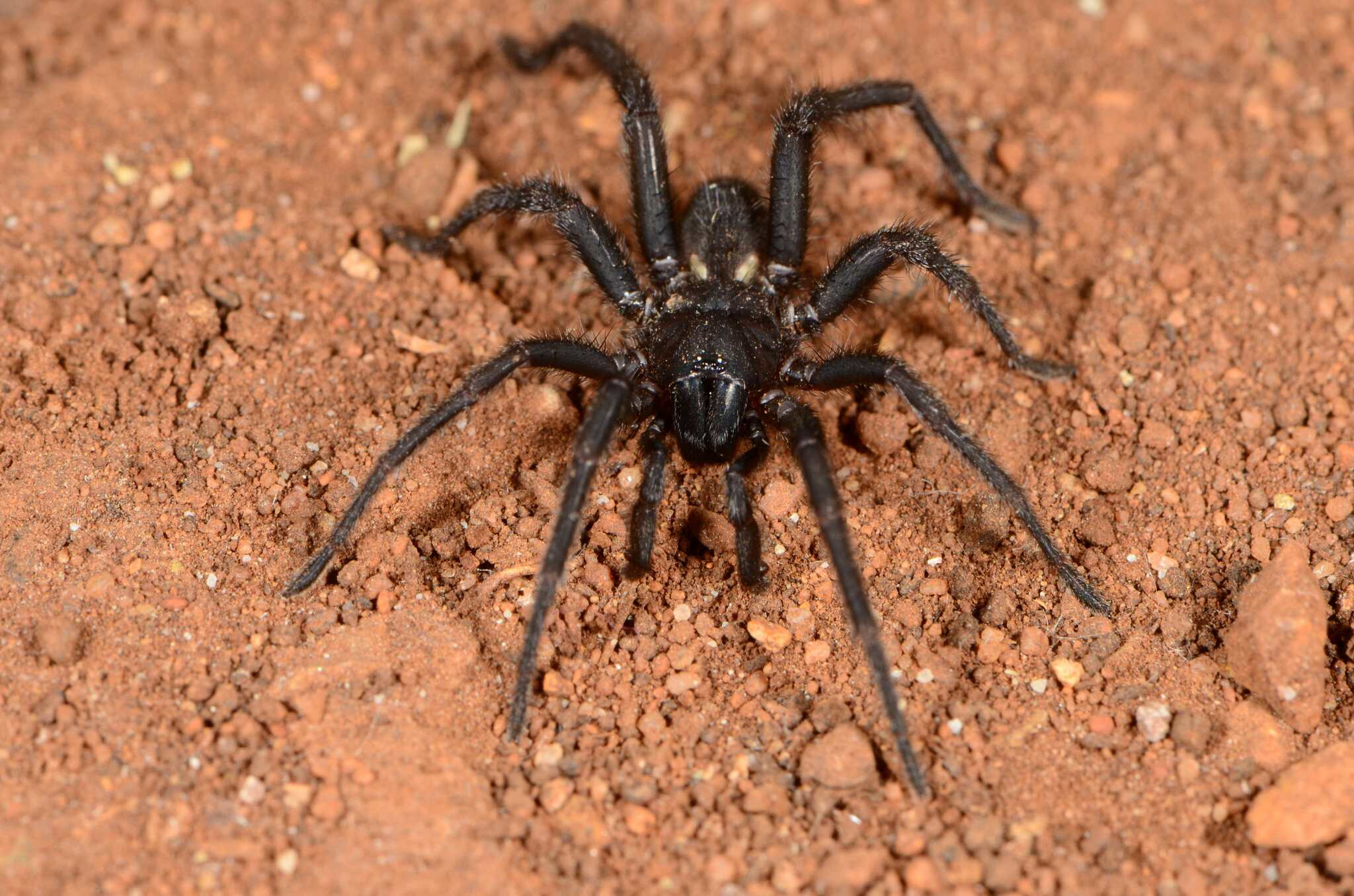
- adult male

Conservation status
- Least Concern (SANBI Red List)

Scientific classification
- Kingdom: Animalia
- Phylum: Arthropoda
- Subphylum: Chelicerata
- Class: Arachnida
- Order: Araneae
- Infraorder: Mygalomorphae
- Family: Cyrtaucheniidae
- Genus: Ancylotrypa
- Species: A. pretoriae

Binomial name
- Ancylotrypa pretoriae (Hewitt, 1913)

Synonyms
- Pelmatorycter pretoriae Hewitt, 1913

= Ancylotrypa pretoriae =

Pretoria wafer-lid trapdoor spider

Species of spider

Ancylotrypa pretoriae, commonly known as the Pretoria wafer-lid trapdoor spider, is a species of spider of the genus Ancylotrypa. It is endemic to South Africa.

== Distribution ==
Ancylotrypa pretoriae is known from five provinces: Gauteng, North West, Limpopo, Mpumalanga, Free State, and Northern Cape. The type locality is Garsfontein in Gauteng. The species occurs at elevations between 99 and 454 meters above sea level.

== Habitat and ecology ==
Ground dweller that lives in silk-lined burrows. Males wander in search of females. The species has been sampled from the Grassland and Savanna biomes.

== Description ==
Both sexes have been described for this species.

== Conservation ==
Listed as Least Concern on the South African Red List due to its wide geographical range. The species is protected in Roodeplaat Dam Nature Reserve, Onderstepoort Nature Reserve, Faerie Glenn Nature Reserve, Erfenis Dam Nature Reserve, and Benfontein Nature Reserve.
