= Ancylotrypa nuda =

Pale wafer-lid trapdoor spider

Conservation status
- Least Concern (SANBI Red List)

Scientific classification
- Kingdom: Animalia
- Phylum: Arthropoda
- Subphylum: Chelicerata
- Class: Arachnida
- Order: Araneae
- Infraorder: Mygalomorphae
- Family: Cyrtaucheniidae
- Genus: Ancylotrypa
- Species: A. nuda

Binomial name
- Ancylotrypa nuda (Hewitt, 1916)

Synonyms
- Pelmatorycter nudus Hewitt, 1916

Species of spider

Ancylotrypa nuda, commonly known as the pale wafer-lid trapdoor spider, is a species of spider of the genus Ancylotrypa. It is endemic to South Africa.

== Distribution ==
Ancylotrypa nuda is known from five provinces: Gauteng, KwaZulu-Natal, Limpopo, Mpumalanga, and North West. The type locality is Magaliesberg. The species occurs at elevations between 27 and 1698 meters above sea level.

== Habitat and ecology ==
They live in silk-lined burrows. The burrow of the undescribed female was found under a stone, made in soft sand mixed with pebbles. The lid was in the form of a hood without a distinct hinge, jointed to the burrow on all sides but the front, over which it folded down. The species has been sampled from the Grassland, Indian Ocean Coastal Belt and Savanna biomes.

== Description ==
Both males and females have been described for this species.

== Conservation ==
Listed as Least Concern on the South African Red List due to its wide geographical range. The species is protected in Alice Glockner Nature Reserve, Tswaing Crater Nature Reserve, Ophathe Game Reserve, Luvhondo Nature Reserve, and Kgaswane Nature Reserve.
