= Ancylotrypa lateralis =

Eastern Cape wafer-lid trapdoor spider

Scientific classification
- Kingdom: Animalia
- Phylum: Arthropoda
- Subphylum: Chelicerata
- Class: Arachnida
- Order: Araneae
- Infraorder: Mygalomorphae
- Family: Cyrtaucheniidae
- Genus: Ancylotrypa
- Species: A. lateralis

Binomial name
- Ancylotrypa lateralis (Purcell, 1902)

Synonyms
- Cyrtauchenius lateralis Purcell, 1902; Pelmatorycter lateralis Simon, 1903

Species of spider

Ancylotrypa lateralis is a species of spider of the genus Ancylotrypa. It is endemic to the Eastern Cape, South Africa.

== Distribution ==
Ancylotrypa lateralis is an Eastern Cape endemic described from Dunbrody. It is known from Dunbrody and Uitenhage (Sunday's River Valley), at an elevation of 60 meters above sea level.

== Habitat and ecology ==
Ground dwellers that live in silk-lined burrows in the Thicket biome.

== Description ==
Only the female has been described for this species.

== Conservation ==
Listed as Data Deficient on the South African Red List for taxonomic reasons. The species is known only from a few old records collected prior to 1902. More sampling is needed to collect the male and determine the species range.
