= Ancylotrypa sororum =

Bedford wafer-lid trapdoor spider

Conservation status
- Least Concern (SANBI Red List)

Scientific classification
- Kingdom: Animalia
- Phylum: Arthropoda
- Subphylum: Chelicerata
- Class: Arachnida
- Order: Araneae
- Infraorder: Mygalomorphae
- Family: Cyrtaucheniidae
- Genus: Ancylotrypa
- Species: A. sororum

Binomial name
- Ancylotrypa sororum (Hewitt, 1916)

Synonyms
- Pelmatorycter sororum Hewitt, 1916

Species of spider

Ancylotrypa sororum, commonly known as the Bedford wafer-lid trapdoor spider, is a species of spider of the genus Ancylotrypa. It is endemic to South Africa.

== Distribution ==
Ancylotrypa sororum is known from three provinces: Eastern Cape, Northern Cape, and Western Cape. The type locality is Bedford in the Eastern Cape. It has been recorded from Bedford, Mountain Zebra National Park, Asante Sana Private Game Reserve, Fort Fordyce Forest Reserve, Benfontein Dam, and Karoo National Park, at elevations between 751 and 3713 meters above sea level.

== Habitat and ecology ==
This species is a ground dweller that lives in silk-lined burrows sampled from the Grassland, Nama Karoo and Thicket biomes.

== Description ==
Both males and females have been described for this species.

== Conservation ==
Listed as Least Concern on the South African Red List due to its wide geographical range. The species is protected in Mountain Zebra National Park, Karoo National Park, Asante Sana Private Game Reserve, and Fort Fordyce Forest Reserve.
