= Ancylotrypa dentata =

Wafer-lid trapdoor spider

Scientific classification
- Kingdom: Animalia
- Phylum: Arthropoda
- Subphylum: Chelicerata
- Class: Arachnida
- Order: Araneae
- Infraorder: Mygalomorphae
- Family: Cyrtaucheniidae
- Genus: Ancylotrypa
- Species: A. dentata

Binomial name
- Ancylotrypa dentata (Purcell, 1903)

Synonyms
- Cyrtauchenius dentatus Purcell, 1903

Species of spider

Ancylotrypa dentata is a species of spider of the genus Ancylotrypa. It is endemic to the Northern Cape, South Africa.

== Distribution ==
Ancylotrypa dentata is a Northern Cape endemic known only from the type locality of Hanover, at an elevation of 1358 meters above sea level.

== Habitat and ecology ==
Ground dwellers that live in silk-lined burrows. The species has been sampled from the Nama Karoo biome.

== Description ==
Only the female has been described for this species.

== Conservation ==
Listed as Data Deficient on the South African Red List for taxonomic reasons. More sampling is needed to collect the male and determine the species' present range.
