= Ancylotrypa breyeri =

Breyer's wafer-lid trapdoor spider

Scientific classification
- Kingdom: Animalia
- Phylum: Arthropoda
- Subphylum: Chelicerata
- Class: Arachnida
- Order: Araneae
- Infraorder: Mygalomorphae
- Family: Cyrtaucheniidae
- Genus: Ancylotrypa
- Species: A. breyeri

Binomial name
- Ancylotrypa breyeri (Hewitt, 1919)

Synonyms
- Pelmatorycter breyeri Hewitt, 1919

Species of spider

Ancylotrypa breyeri, commonly known as Breyer's wafer-lid trapdoor spider, is a species of spider of the genus Ancylotrypa. It is endemic to KwaZulu-Natal, South Africa.

== Distribution ==
Ancylotrypa breyeri is a KwaZulu-Natal endemic species known only from the type locality of Klipspruit, at an elevation of 1013 meters above sea level.

== Habitat and ecology ==
Ground dwellers that live in silk-lined burrows. The species has been sampled from the Savanna biome.

== Description ==
Both males and females have been described for this species.

== Conservation ==
Listed as Data Deficient on the South African Red List. The specimen was sampled prior to 1919 and the species is known only from the type locality. More sampling is needed to determine its present range.
