= Rhytidicolus =

Scientific classification
- Kingdom: Animalia
- Phylum: Arthropoda
- Subphylum: Chelicerata
- Class: Arachnida
- Order: Araneae
- Infraorder: Mygalomorphae
- Family: Rhytidicolidae
- Genus: Rhytidicolus; Simon, 1889
- Species: R. structor

Binomial name
- Rhytidicolus structor Simon, 1889

Genus of spiders

Rhytidicolus is a monotypic genus of South American spiders in the family Rhytidicolidae, containing the single species, Rhytidicolus structor. It was first described by Eugène Simon in 1889, and has only been found in Venezuela. Originally placed with the Ctenizidae, it was moved to the Cyrtaucheniidae in 1985 and to the Rhytidicolidae in 2022.
