= Ancylotrypa nudipes =

Dassiekrans wafer-lid trapdoor spider

Scientific classification
- Kingdom: Animalia
- Phylum: Arthropoda
- Subphylum: Chelicerata
- Class: Arachnida
- Order: Araneae
- Infraorder: Mygalomorphae
- Family: Cyrtaucheniidae
- Genus: Ancylotrypa
- Species: A. nudipes

Binomial name
- Ancylotrypa nudipes (Hewitt, 1923)

Synonyms
- Pelmatorycter nudipes Hewitt, 1923

Species of spider

Ancylotrypa nudipes, commonly known as the Dassiekrans wafer-lid trapdoor spider, is a species of spider of the genus Ancylotrypa. It is endemic to the Eastern Cape, South Africa.

== Distribution ==
Ancylotrypa nudipes is an Eastern Cape endemic known only from the type locality of Dassiekrans, Grahamstown, at an elevation of 552 meters above sea level.

== Habitat and ecology ==
Ground dweller that lives in silk-lined burrows. The species has been sampled from the Thicket biome.

== Description ==
Only the male has been described for this species.

== Conservation ==
Listed as Data Deficient on the South African Red List for taxonomic reasons. The species is known only from the holotype male. More sampling is needed to collect the female and determine the species' present range.
