= Ancylotrypa oneili =

O'Neil's wafer-lid trapdoor spider

Scientific classification
- Kingdom: Animalia
- Phylum: Arthropoda
- Subphylum: Chelicerata
- Class: Arachnida
- Order: Araneae
- Infraorder: Mygalomorphae
- Family: Cyrtaucheniidae
- Genus: Ancylotrypa
- Species: A. oneili

Binomial name
- Ancylotrypa oneili (Purcell, 1902)

Synonyms
- Cyrtauchenius o'neili Purcell, 1902; Pelmatorycter oneili Simon, 1903

Species of spider

Ancylotrypa oneili, commonly known as O'Neil's wafer-lid trapdoor spider, is a species of spider of the genus Ancylotrypa. It is endemic to the Eastern Cape, South Africa.

== Distribution ==
Ancylotrypa oneili is an Eastern Cape endemic known only from the type locality of Dunbrody, Sunday's River, at an elevation of 66 meters above sea level.

== Habitat and ecology ==
Free-living ground dwellers that live in silk-lined burrows. The species has been sampled from the Thicket biome.

== Description ==
Only the female has been described for this species.

== Conservation ==
Listed as Data Deficient on the South African Red List for taxonomic reasons. The species is known only from the holotype female. More sampling is needed to collect the male and determine the species' range.
