= Ancylotrypa rufescens =

Roodeplaat wafer-lid trapdoor spider

Conservation status
- Least Concern (SANBI Red List)

Scientific classification
- Kingdom: Animalia
- Phylum: Arthropoda
- Subphylum: Chelicerata
- Class: Arachnida
- Order: Araneae
- Infraorder: Mygalomorphae
- Family: Cyrtaucheniidae
- Genus: Ancylotrypa
- Species: A. rufescens

Binomial name
- Ancylotrypa rufescens (Hewitt, 1916)

Synonyms
- Pelmatorycter pretoriae rufescens Hewitt, 1916

Species of spider

Ancylotrypa rufescens, commonly known as the Roodeplaat wafer-lid trapdoor spider, is a species of spider of the genus Ancylotrypa. It is endemic to South Africa.

== Distribution ==
Ancylotrypa rufescens is known from three provinces: Gauteng, Limpopo, and North West. The type locality is Roodeplaatdam. The species occurs at elevations between 1051 and 1439 meters above sea level.

== Habitat and ecology ==
Ground dweller that lives in silk-lined burrows from the Savanna biome.

== Description ==
Both sexes have been described for this species.

== Conservation ==
Listed as Least Concern on the South African Red List. Although identification of the species is still problematic, it appears to be widespread. The species is protected in Roodeplaatdam Nature Reserve.
