= Ancylotrypa zebra =

Zebra wafer-lid trapdoor spider

Conservation status
- Least Concern (SANBI Red List)

Scientific classification
- Kingdom: Animalia
- Phylum: Arthropoda
- Subphylum: Chelicerata
- Class: Arachnida
- Order: Araneae
- Infraorder: Mygalomorphae
- Family: Cyrtaucheniidae
- Genus: Ancylotrypa
- Species: A. zebra

Binomial name
- Ancylotrypa zebra (Simon, 1892)

Synonyms
- Cyrtauchenius zebra Simon, 1892

Species of spider

Ancylotrypa zebra, commonly known as the zebra wafer-lid trapdoor spider, is a species of spider of the genus Ancylotrypa. It is endemic to South Africa.

== Distribution ==
Ancylotrypa zebra is known from four provinces: Eastern Cape, KwaZulu-Natal, Limpopo, and Mpumalanga. The type locality is given only as "Zululand". The species has a wide distribution range with records from multiple locations including Ndumo Game Reserve, Sani Pass (at various altitudes), iSimangaliso Wetland Park, uMkhuze Game Reserve, and Kruger National Park, occurring at elevations between 36 and 2985 meters above sea level.

== Habitat and ecology ==
Ground dweller that lives in silk-lined burrows. Males have commonly been found in pitfall traps in the Grassland, Savanna, and Indian Ocean Coastal Belt biomes.

== Description ==
The species has distinct patterns on the abdomen that make identification easy. Although no detailed drawings are available in the literature, the distinctive markings are diagnostic. Only the female has been formally described.

== Conservation ==
Listed as Least Concern on the South African Red List due to its wide geographical range. The species is protected in Ndumo Game Reserve, Kruger National Park, and uMkhuze Game Reserve.
