= Ancylotrypa flavidofusula =

Alicedale wafer-lid trapdoor spider

Scientific classification
- Kingdom: Animalia
- Phylum: Arthropoda
- Subphylum: Chelicerata
- Class: Arachnida
- Order: Araneae
- Infraorder: Mygalomorphae
- Family: Cyrtaucheniidae
- Genus: Ancylotrypa
- Species: A. flavidofusula

Binomial name
- Ancylotrypa flavidofusula (Hewitt, 1915)

Synonyms
- Pelmatorycter flavidofusulus Hewitt, 1915

Species of spider

Ancylotrypa flavidofusula, commonly known as the Alicedale wafer-lid trapdoor spider, is a species of spider of the genus Ancylotrypa. It is endemic to the Eastern Cape, South Africa.

== Distribution ==
Ancylotrypa flavidofusula is an Eastern Cape endemic known only from the type locality of Alicedale, at an elevation of 283 meters above sea level.

== Habitat and ecology ==
Ground dweller that lives in silk-lined burrows. Males wander in search of females. The species has been sampled from the Thicket biome.

== Description ==
Only the female has been described for this species.

== Conservation ==
Listed as Data Deficient on the South African Red List for taxonomic reasons. The species is known only from the holotype female. More sampling is needed to collect the male and determine its present range.
