= Ancylotrypa brevicornis =

Venterskroon wafer-lid trapdoor spider

Conservation status
- Least Concern (SANBI Red List)

Scientific classification
- Kingdom: Animalia
- Phylum: Arthropoda
- Subphylum: Chelicerata
- Class: Arachnida
- Order: Araneae
- Infraorder: Mygalomorphae
- Family: Cyrtaucheniidae
- Genus: Ancylotrypa
- Species: A. brevicornis

Binomial name
- Ancylotrypa brevicornis (Hewitt, 1919)

Synonyms
- Pelmatorycter brevicornis Hewitt, 1919

Species of spider

Ancylotrypa brevicornis, commonly known as the Venterskroon wafer-lid trapdoor spider, is a species of spider of the genus Ancylotrypa. It is endemic to South Africa.

== Distribution ==
Ancylotrypa brevicornis is known from three South African provinces: Gauteng, Limpopo, and North West. Type locality is Venterskroon in North West Province. The species occurs at elevations between 1120 and 1628 meters above sea level.

== Habitat and ecology ==
This species is a free-living ground dweller that lives in silk-lined burrows. In addition to constructing a thin wafer-lid trapdoor, these spiders use a hard, spherical plug made of soil particles held together by silk to close the burrow entrance. The species has been sampled from both Grassland and Savanna biomes.

== Description ==
Both males and females have been described for this species.

== Conservation ==
Listed as Least Concern on the South African Red List. The species is protected in Nylsvley Nature Reserve, where burrow-constructing behavior has been studied.
