= Ancylotrypa coloniae =

Jansenville wafer-lid trapdoor spider

Scientific classification
- Kingdom: Animalia
- Phylum: Arthropoda
- Subphylum: Chelicerata
- Class: Arachnida
- Order: Araneae
- Infraorder: Mygalomorphae
- Family: Cyrtaucheniidae
- Genus: Ancylotrypa
- Species: A. coloniae

Binomial name
- Ancylotrypa coloniae (Pocock, 1902)

Synonyms
- Pelmatorycter coloniae Pocock, 1902

Species of spider

Ancylotrypa coloniae, commonly known as the Jansenville wafer-lid trapdoor spider, is a species of spider of the genus Ancylotrypa. It is endemic to the Eastern Cape, South Africa.

== Distribution ==
Ancylotrypa coloniae is an Eastern Cape endemic known only from the type locality of Jansenville, at an elevation of 444 meters above sea level.

== Habitat and ecology ==
Free-living ground dwellers that live in silk-lined burrows. The species has been sampled from the Thicket biome.

== Description ==
Only the female has been described for this species.

== Conservation ==
Listed as Data Deficient on the South African Red List for taxonomic reasons. More sampling is needed to collect the male and determine the species' range.
