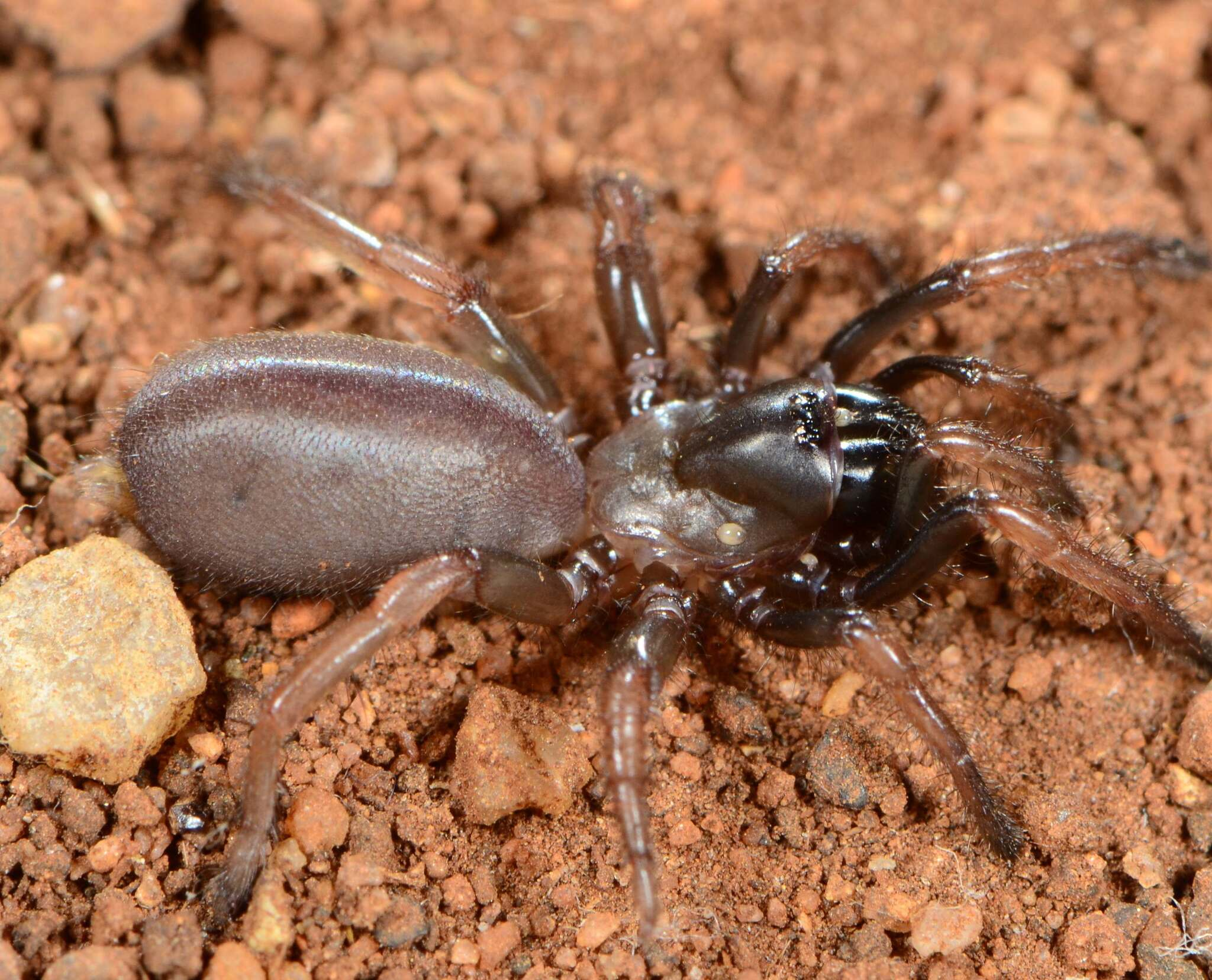
- female A. brevipalpis
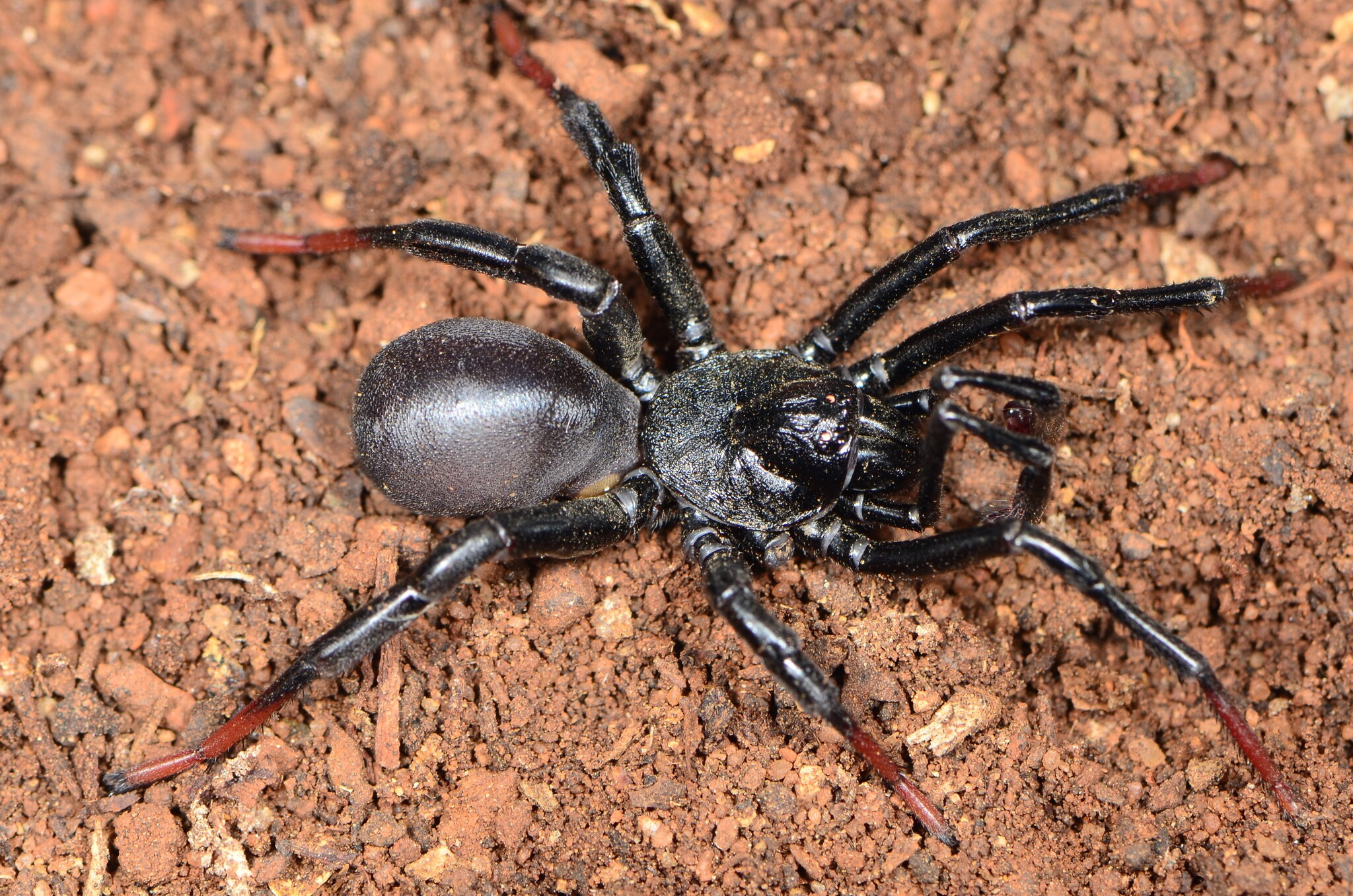
- male A. nigriceps

Scientific classification
- Kingdom: Animalia
- Phylum: Arthropoda
- Subphylum: Chelicerata
- Class: Arachnida
- Order: Araneae
- Infraorder: Mygalomorphae
- Family: Cyrtaucheniidae
- Genus: Ancylotrypa; Simon, 1889

Type species
- Ancylotrypa fossor Simon, 1889

Diversity
- 43 species

Synonyms
- Clitotrema Simon, 1904; Pelmatorycter Pocock, 1902; Stasimopella Roewer, 1953

= Ancylotrypa =

Wafer-lid trapdoor spiders

Genus of trapdoor spiders

Ancylotrypa is a genus of mygalomorph spiders in the family Cyrtaucheniidae, commonly known as African wafer-lid trapdoor spiders. The genus is endemic to Africa and contains 43 described species, with 29 species occurring in South Africa.

== Taxonomy ==
The genus Ancylotrypa was established by Eugène Simon in 1889 with Ancylotrypa fossor as the type species. The genus was originally placed in the family Ctenizidae but was later transferred to Cyrtaucheniidae by Raven in 1985.

Three genera have been synonymized with Ancylotrypa: Pelmatorycter Pocock, 1902 (with type species Cyrtauchenius flaviceps Pocock, 1898), Clitotrema Simon, 1904 (with type species C. zeltneri Simon, 1904), and Stasimopella Roewer, 1953 (with type species S. kateka Roewer, 1953). All three synonymizations were established by Raven in 1985.

The genus has not been comprehensively revised, though Opatova and colleagues discussed its phylogenetic placement in 2020.

== Description ==
Members of Ancylotrypa are medium to large spiders with a total body length ranging from 9 to 32 mm. Males are typically slightly smaller and more slender than females.

Female Ancylotrypa have a strongly arched cephalothorax that narrows toward the posterior end. The fovea is broad and procurved. The eye group forms a rectangle that is approximately twice as wide as it is long, with the eye tubercle either low or absent. The chelicerae bear a rastellum consisting of several blunt spines on a low mound, while the anterior lobe is indistinct. The sternum is broad posteriorly, with large posterior sigilla that are either pear-shaped or oval. The opisthosoma is elongated and oval-shaped, often displaying bands or spots. The third and fourth pairs of legs are longer and more robust than the first two pairs.

Males have more slender chelicerae than females and lack a mating spur.

== Behavior and ecology ==
Ancylotrypa species construct silk-lined burrows with depths varying between species, with the main portion reaching depths of up to 32 cm. The architecture of these burrows varies considerably, ranging from simple single tubes to Y-shaped structures or curved pipe configurations. Some species construct side chambers that may or may not have lids. The burrows are sealed with soft lids of various shapes, giving these spiders their common name of wafer-lid trapdoor spiders. During daylight hours, the spiders typically reside in the lower portion of their burrows.

Males are more active than females and are frequently collected in pitfall traps. In urban areas, they commonly drown in swimming pools. Research conducted by Engelbrecht in 2013 at multiple sites in Gauteng Province, South Africa, demonstrated that trapdoor spider activity occurs throughout all seasons. Each species exhibits a discrete period of activity that can range from a few weeks to several months. This study included four Ancylotrypa species: A. brevipalpis, A. pretoriae, A. nigriceps, and A. rufescens.

== Distribution ==
The genus Ancylotrypa is endemic to Africa, with species distributed across the continent from South Africa northward to Ethiopia and from Namibia eastward to Kenya. The highest diversity occurs in South Africa, which hosts 29 of the 43 described species. Other countries with notable species diversity include the Democratic Republic of Congo, Kenya, Ethiopia, Namibia, and Botswana.

== Species ==
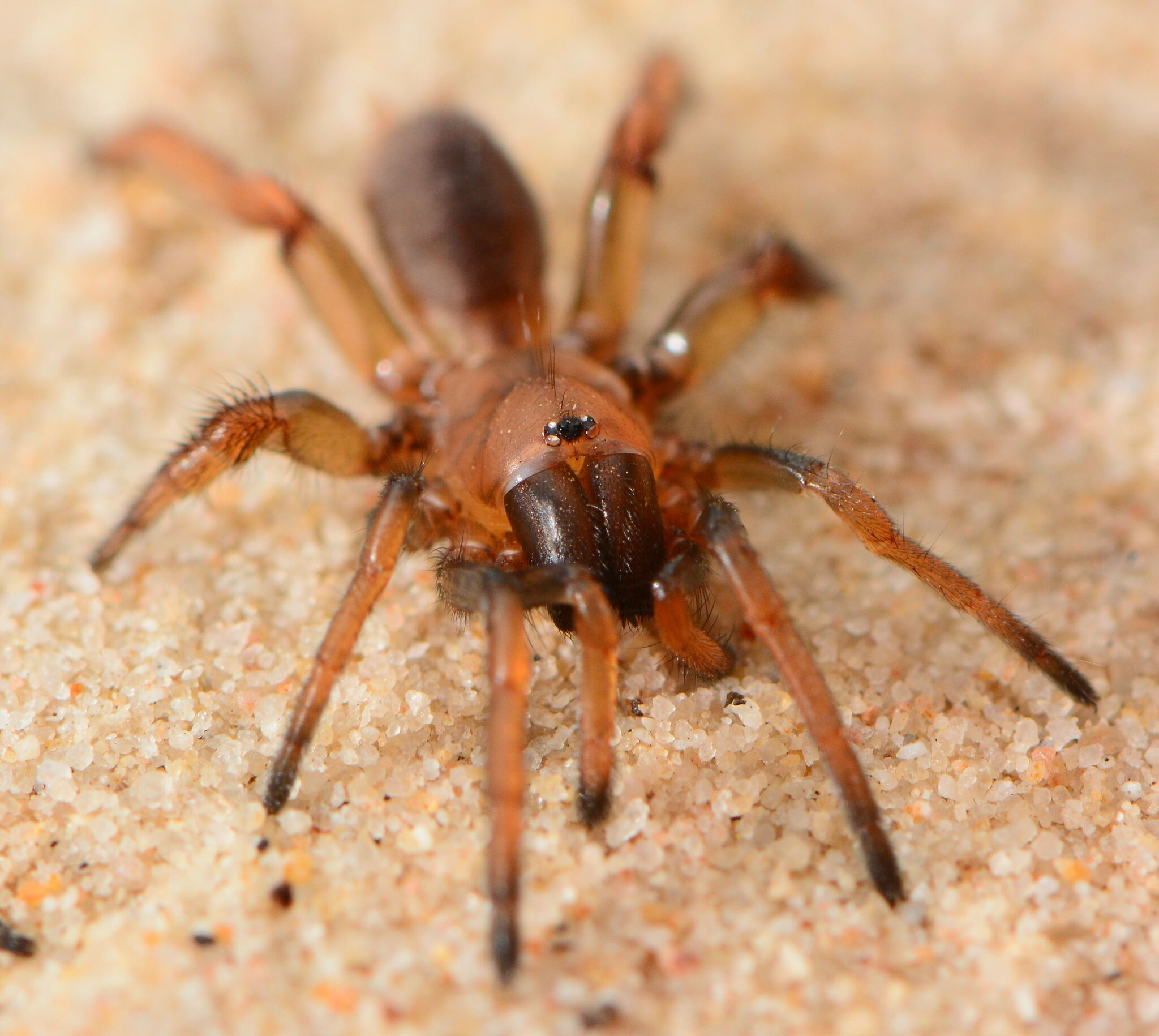
male A. brevipalpis

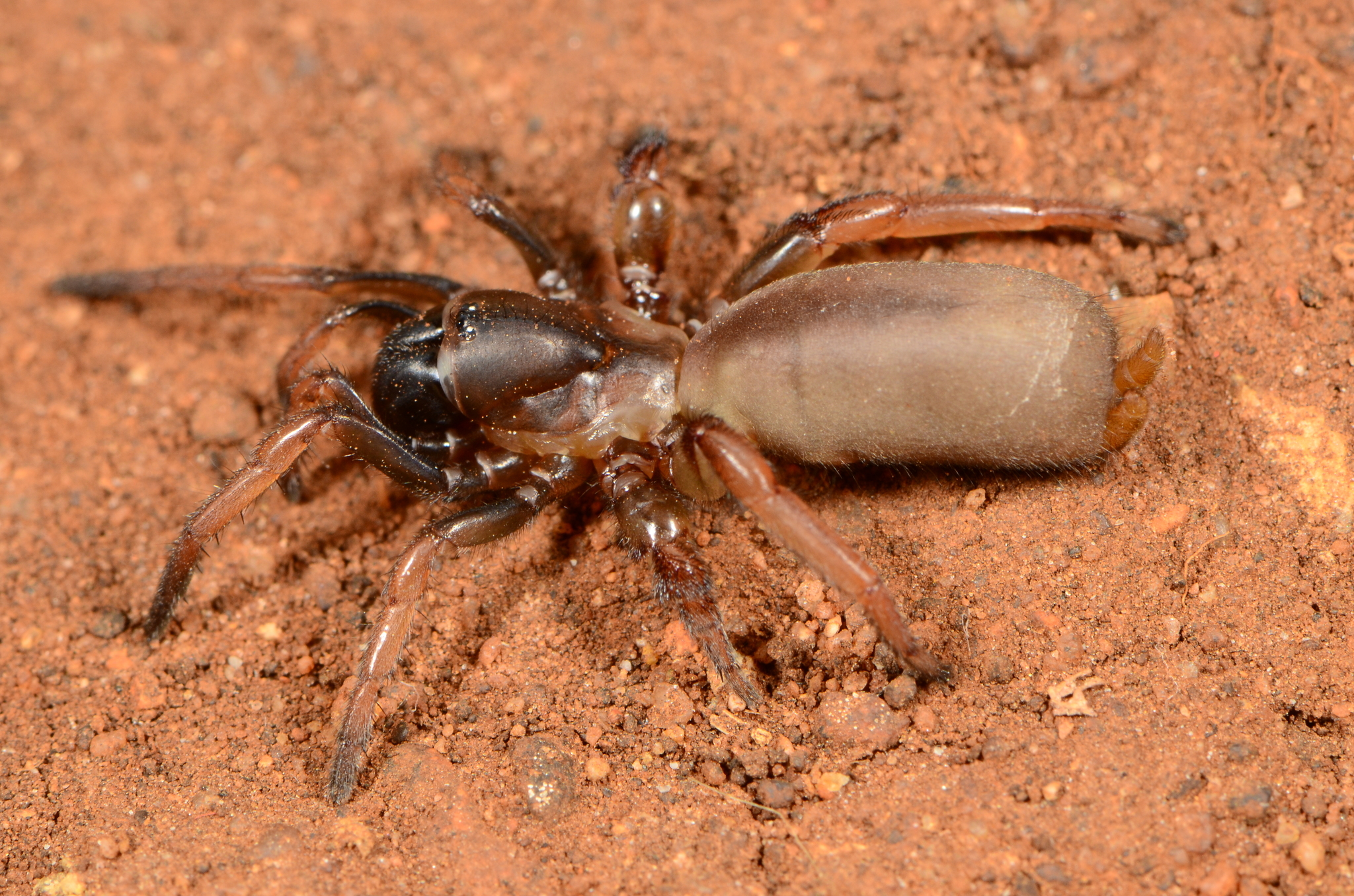
female A. elongata

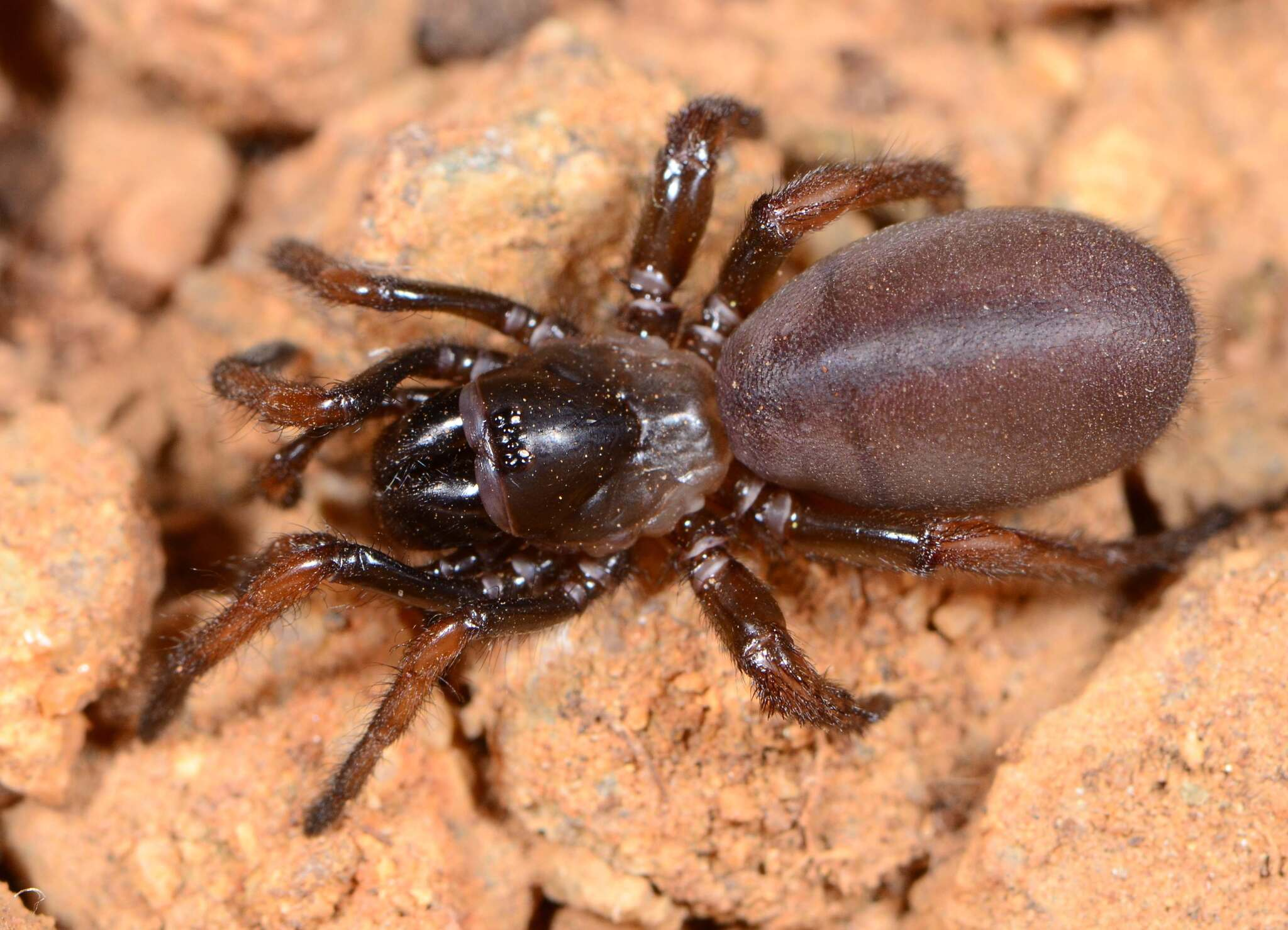
female A. pretoriae

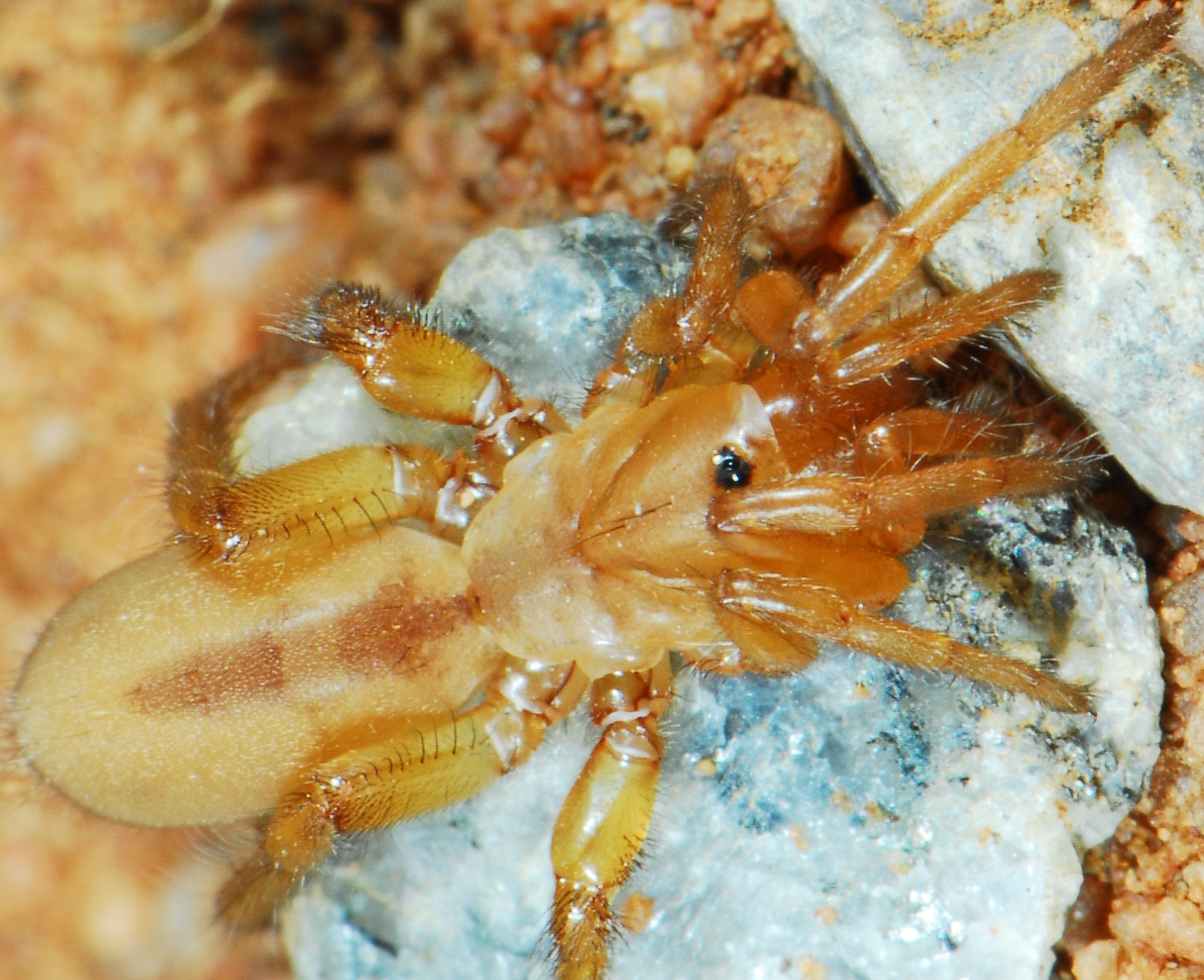
juvenile A. pusilla

As of September 2025, the World Spider Catalog recognizes 43 valid species:

- Ancylotrypa angulata Roewer, 1953 – DR Congo
- Ancylotrypa atra Strand, 1906 – Ethiopia, Kenya
- Ancylotrypa barbertoni (Hewitt, 1913) – South Africa
- Ancylotrypa brevicornis (Hewitt, 1919) – South Africa
- Ancylotrypa brevipalpis (Hewitt, 1916) – South Africa
- Ancylotrypa brevipes (Karsch, 1879) – West Africa
- Ancylotrypa breyeri (Hewitt, 1919) – South Africa
- Ancylotrypa bulcocki (Hewitt, 1916) – South Africa
- Ancylotrypa coloniae (Pocock, 1902) – South Africa
- Ancylotrypa cornuta Purcell, 1904 – South Africa
- Ancylotrypa decorata (Lessert, 1938) – DR Congo
- Ancylotrypa dentata (Purcell, 1903) – South Africa
- Ancylotrypa dreyeri (Hewitt, 1915) – South Africa
- Ancylotrypa elongata Purcell, 1908 – Namibia, Botswana, South Africa
- Ancylotrypa fasciata Fage, 1936 – Kenya
- Ancylotrypa flaviceps (Pocock, 1898) – East Africa
- Ancylotrypa flavidofusula (Hewitt, 1915) – South Africa
- Ancylotrypa fodiens (Thorell, 1899) – Cameroon
- Ancylotrypa fossor Simon, 1889 – Central Africa (type species)
- Ancylotrypa granulata (Hewitt, 1935) – Botswana
- Ancylotrypa kankundana Roewer, 1953 – DR Congo
- Ancylotrypa kateka (Roewer, 1953) – DR Congo
- Ancylotrypa lateralis (Purcell, 1902) – South Africa
- Ancylotrypa magnisigillata (Hewitt, 1914) – South Africa
- Ancylotrypa namaquensis (Purcell, 1908) – South Africa
- Ancylotrypa nigriceps (Purcell, 1902) – South Africa
- Ancylotrypa nuda (Hewitt, 1916) – South Africa
- Ancylotrypa nudipes (Hewitt, 1923) – South Africa
- Ancylotrypa oneili (Purcell, 1902) – South Africa
- Ancylotrypa pallidipes (Purcell, 1904) – South Africa
- Ancylotrypa parva (Hewitt, 1916) – South Africa
- Ancylotrypa pretoriae (Hewitt, 1913) – South Africa
- Ancylotrypa pusilla Purcell, 1903 – South Africa
- Ancylotrypa rufescens (Hewitt, 1916) – South Africa
- Ancylotrypa schultzei (Purcell, 1908) – Namibia
- Ancylotrypa sororum (Hewitt, 1916) – South Africa
- Ancylotrypa spinosa Simon, 1889 – South Africa
- Ancylotrypa tookei (Hewitt, 1919) – South Africa
- Ancylotrypa tuckeri Roewer, 1953 – DR Congo
- Ancylotrypa vryheidensis (Hewitt, 1915) – South Africa
- Ancylotrypa zebra (Simon, 1892) – South Africa
- Ancylotrypa zeltneri (Simon, 1904) – Ethiopia
- Ancylotrypa zuluensis (Lawrence, 1937) – South Africa

=== Nomen dubium ===
- Ancylotrypa bicornuta Strand, 1906 – South Africa
