= Bolostromoides =

Scientific classification
- Kingdom: Animalia
- Phylum: Arthropoda
- Subphylum: Chelicerata
- Class: Arachnida
- Order: Araneae
- Infraorder: Mygalomorphae
- Family: Cyrtaucheniidae
- Genus: Bolostromoides; Schiapelli & Gerschman, 1945
- Species: B. summorum

Binomial name
- Bolostromoides summorum Schiapelli & Gerschman, 1945

Genus of spiders

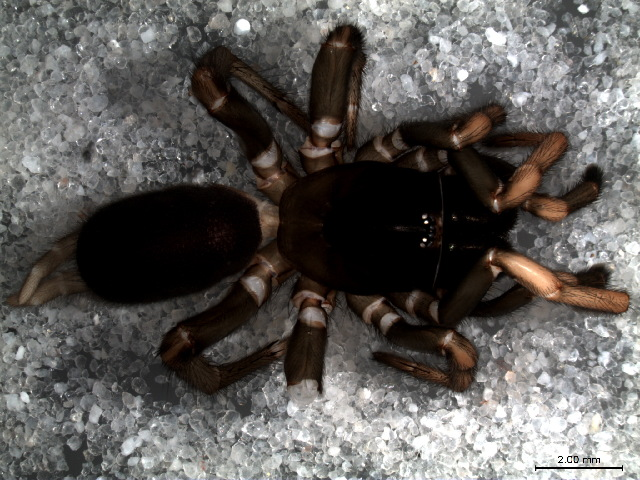

Bolostromoides is a monotypic genus of South American wafer trapdoor spiders containing the single species, Bolostromoides summorum. It was first described by R. D. Schiapelli & B. S. Gerschman in 1945, and has only been found in Venezuela.
