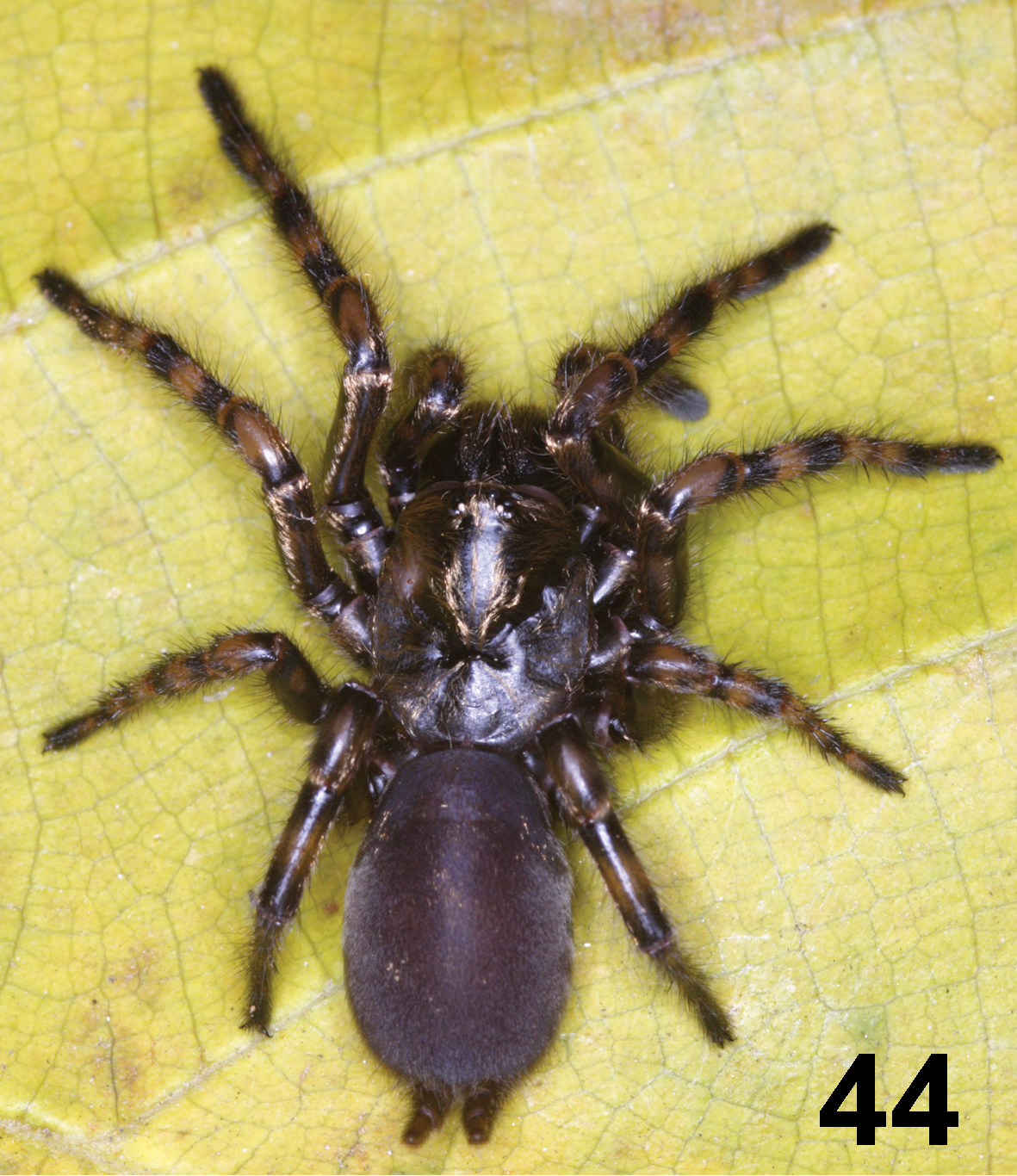
- female Fufius lucasae

Scientific classification
- Kingdom: Animalia
- Phylum: Arthropoda
- Subphylum: Chelicerata
- Class: Arachnida
- Order: Araneae
- Infraorder: Mygalomorphae
- Family: Rhytidicolidae; Simon, 1903
- blue: reported countries (WSC)

= Rhytidicolidae =

Family of spiders

Rhytidicolidae, also known as golden tunnel-web spiders, is a small Neotropical family of mygalomorph spiders first described by Eugène Simon in 1903. It was originally described as a tribe and considered a junior synonym of Aporoptychinae Simon, 1889 (now Cyrtaucheniidae) by Raven in 1985.

In 2022, Rhythidicolidae was elevated to family level. The family currently consists of two genera and fifteen species.

== Genera ==
As of January 2026, this family includes two genera and fifteen species:

- Fufius Simon, 1888 – Trinidad, South America
- Rhytidicolus Simon, 1889 – Brazil, Venezuela
