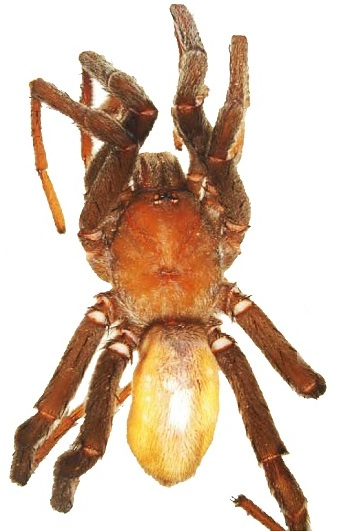
- A. koponeni

Scientific classification
- Kingdom: Animalia
- Phylum: Arthropoda
- Subphylum: Chelicerata
- Class: Arachnida
- Order: Araneae
- Infraorder: Mygalomorphae
- Family: Cyrtaucheniidae
- Genus: Anemesia; Pocock, 1895

Type species
- A. tubifex (Pocock, 1889)

Species
- 14, see text

= Anemesia =

Genus of spiders

Anemesia is a genus of Asian wafer trapdoor spiders that was first described by Reginald Innes Pocock in 1895.

== Species ==
As of May 2019 it contains fourteen species:

- Anemesia andreevae (Zonstein, 2018) – Uzbekistan, Tajikistan
- Anemesia birulai (Spassky, 1937) – Turkmenistan
- Anemesia castanea (Zonstein, 2018) – Tajikistan
- Anemesia incana (Zonstein, 2001) – Tajikistan
- Anemesia infumata (Zonstein, 2018) – Tajikistan
- Anemesia infuscata (Zonstein, 2018) – Tajikistan
- Anemesia karatauvi (Andreeva, 1968) – Tajikistan
- Anemesia koponeni (Marusik, Zamani & Mirshamsi, 2014) – Iran
- Anemesia oxiana (Zonstein, 2018) – Tajikistan
- Anemesia pallida (Zonstein, 2018) – Tajikistan
- Anemesia parvula (Zonstein, 2018) – Tajikistan
- Anemesia pococki (Zonstein, 2018) – Turkmenistan
- Anemesia sogdiana (Zonstein, 2018) – Uzbekistan, Tajikistan
- Anemesia tubifex (Pocock, 1889) (type) – Afghanistan, Turkmenistan
