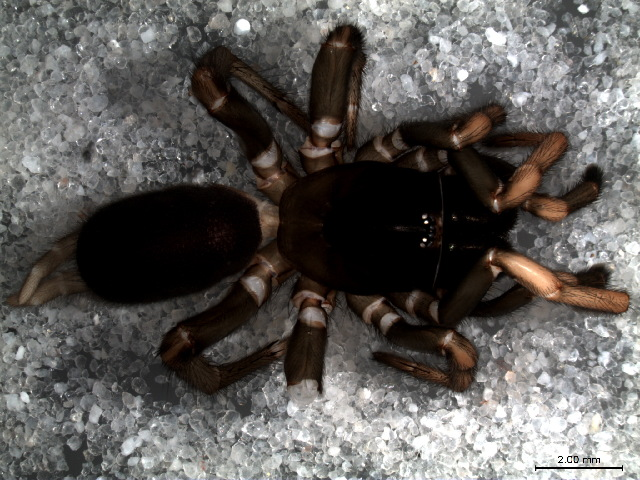
- Bolostromus sp.

Scientific classification
- Kingdom: Animalia
- Phylum: Arthropoda
- Subphylum: Chelicerata
- Class: Arachnida
- Order: Araneae
- Infraorder: Mygalomorphae
- Family: Cyrtaucheniidae
- Genus: Bolostromus; Ausserer, 1875

Type species
- B. venustus Ausserer, 1875

Species
- 23, see text

Synonyms
- Celidotopus Simon, 1889; Phaenothele Simon, 1889; Phaeoclita Simon, 1889

= Bolostromus =

Bolostromus Temporal range: Neogene–present

Genus of spiders

Bolostromus is a genus of wafer trapdoor spiders that was first described by Anton Ausserer in 1875.

== Species ==
As of October 2025, this genus includes 24 species:

- Bolostromus albertinae García-Villafuerte, 2023 – Mexico
- Bolostromus busu Dupérré, 2023 – Dominican Republic
- Bolostromus compi Osorio, Martínez-Hernández & Sherwood, 2024 – Colombia
- Bolostromus devriesi Dupérré, 2023 – Ecuador
- Bolostromus epiphyticus Dupérré, 2023 – Ecuador
- Bolostromus fauna (Simon, 1889) – Venezuela
- Bolostromus fonsecai Dupérré, 2023 – Ecuador
- Bolostromus gaujoni (Simon, 1889) – Ecuador
- Bolostromus holguinensis Rudloff, 1996 – Cuba
- Bolostromus hubeni Dupérré, 2023 – Ecuador
- Bolostromus insularis (Simon, 1892) – St. Vincent
- Bolostromus italoi Dupérré, 2023 – Ecuador
- Bolostromus laheredia Dupérré, 2023 – Costa Rica
- Bolostromus losrios Dupérré, 2023 – Ecuador
- Bolostromus nischki Dupérré, 2023 – Ecuador
- Bolostromus panamanus (Petrunkevitch, 1925) – Costa Rica, Panama
- Bolostromus primus Dupérré, 2023 – Ecuador
- Bolostromus pristirana Dupérré, 2023 – Ecuador
- Bolostromus pulchripes (Simon, 1889) – Venezuela
- Bolostromus riveti Simon, 1903 – Ecuador
- Bolostromus stridulator Dupérré, 2023 – Ecuador
- Bolostromus urku Dupérré, 2023 – Ecuador
- Bolostromus valdivia Dupérré, 2023 – Ecuador
- Bolostromus venustus Ausserer, 1875 – Colombia (type species)

Bolostromus suspectus O. Pickard-Cambridge, 1911, described from a juvenile from Uganda, is considered a nomen dubium.
