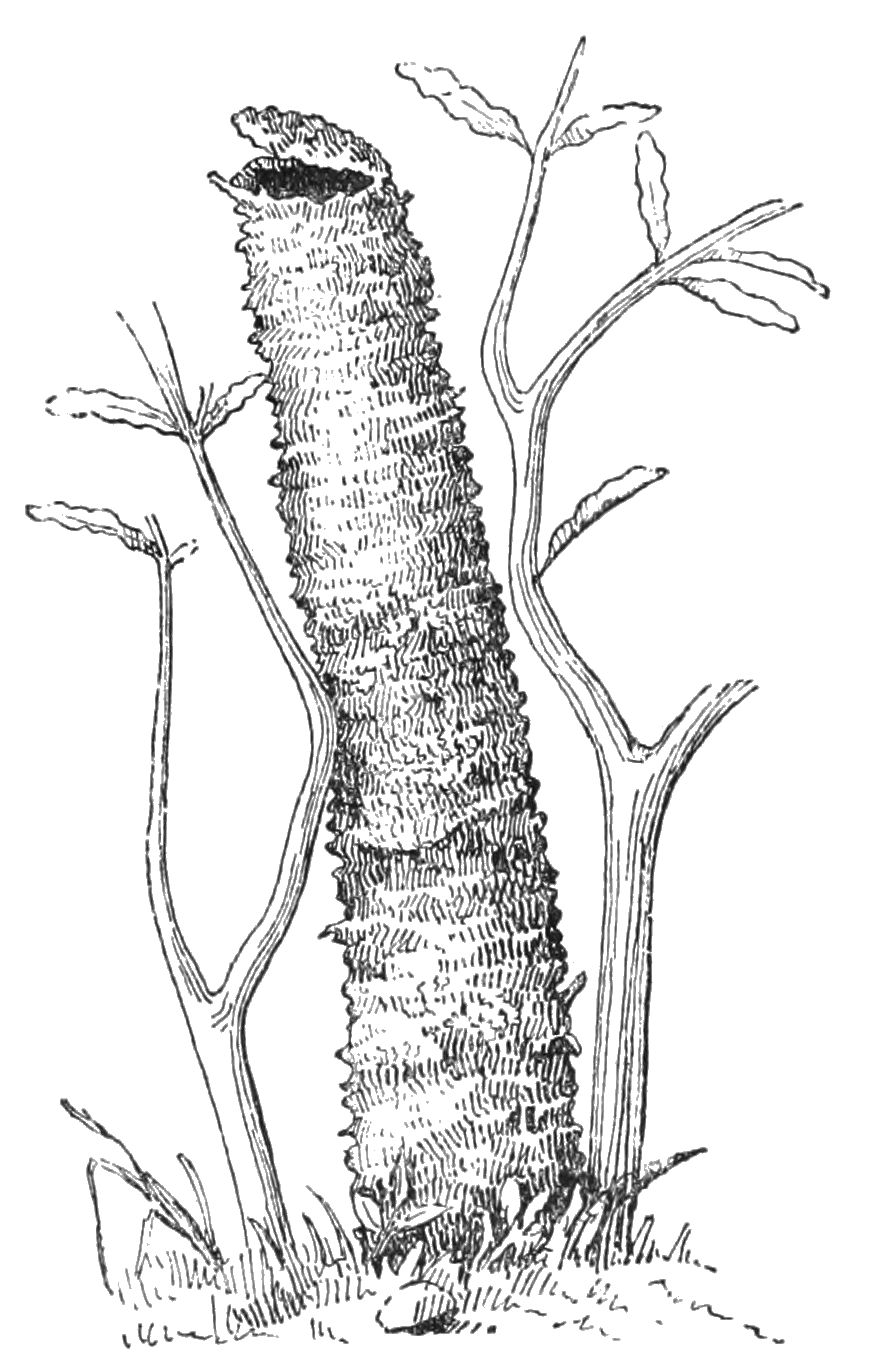
- Turret and trap door of C. latastei

Scientific classification
- Domain: Eukaryota
- Kingdom: Animalia
- Phylum: Arthropoda
- Subphylum: Chelicerata
- Class: Arachnida
- Order: Araneae
- Infraorder: Mygalomorphae
- Family: Cyrtaucheniidae
- Genus: Cyrtauchenius; Thorell, 1869

Type species
- C. terricola (Lucas, 1846)

Species
- 14, see text

= Cyrtauchenius =

Genus of spiders

Cyrtauchenius is a genus of wafer trapdoor spiders that was first described by Tamerlan Thorell in 1869. Originally placed with the Ctenizidae, it was moved to the Cyrtaucheniidae in 1985.

== Species ==
As of May 2019 it contains fourteen species, almost all from Algeria:

- Cyrtauchenius artifex (Simon, 1889) – Algeria
- Cyrtauchenius bedeli Simon, 1881 – Algeria
- Cyrtauchenius bicolor (Simon, 1889) – Algeria
- Cyrtauchenius castaneiceps (Simon, 1889) – Algeria
- Cyrtauchenius dayensis Simon, 1881 – Algeria
- Cyrtauchenius inops (Simon, 1889) – Algeria
- Cyrtauchenius latastei Simon, 1881 – Algeria
- Cyrtauchenius longipalpus (Denis, 1945) – Algeria
- Cyrtauchenius luridus Simon, 1881 – Algeria
- Cyrtauchenius maculatus (Simon, 1889) – Algeria
- Cyrtauchenius structor (Simon, 1889) – Algeria
- Cyrtauchenius talpa Simon, 1891 – USA
- Cyrtauchenius terricola (Lucas, 1846) (type) – Algeria
- Cyrtauchenius vittatus Simon, 1881 – Algeria
