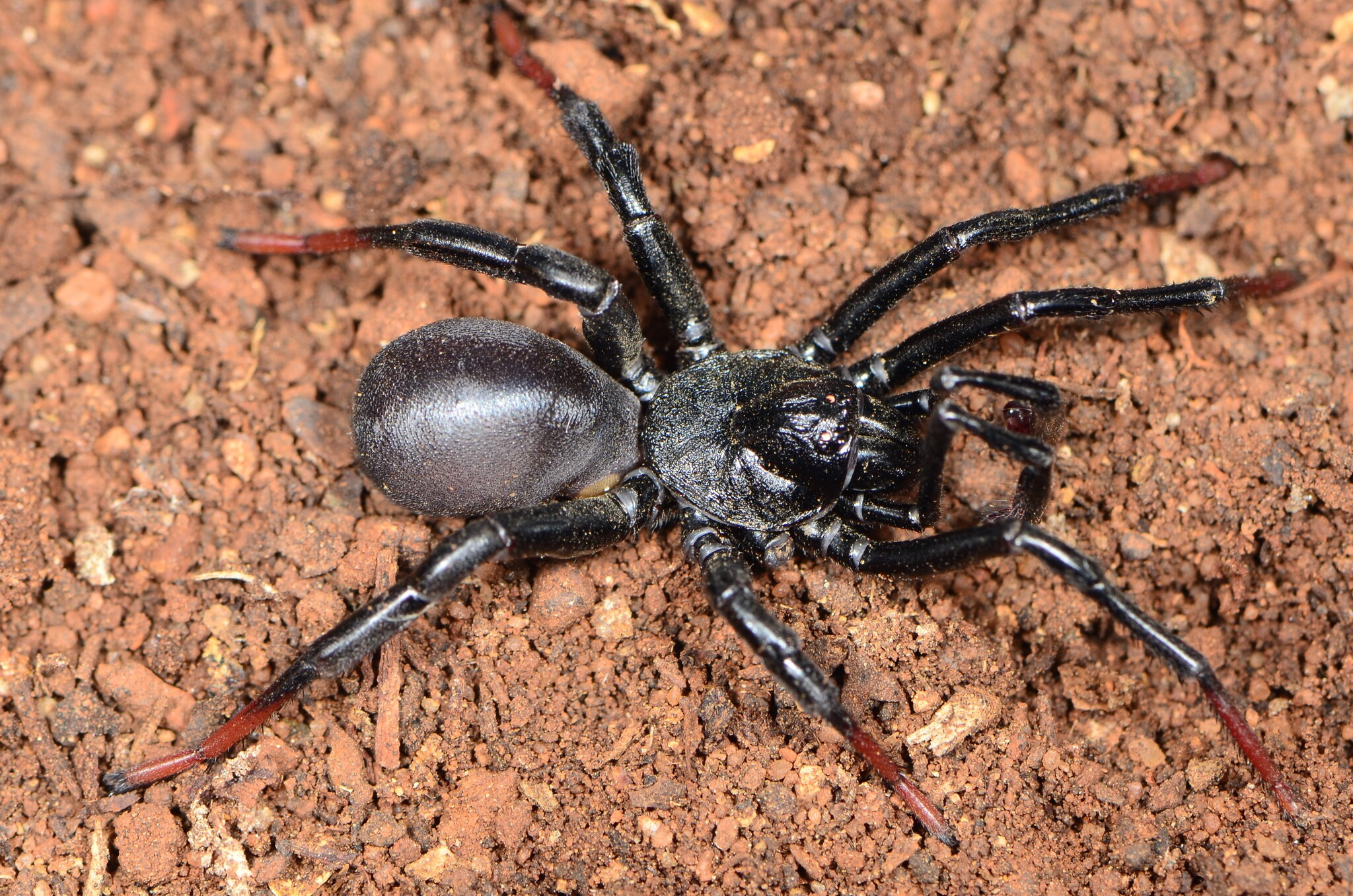
- adult male

Conservation status
- Least Concern (SANBI Red List)

Scientific classification
- Kingdom: Animalia
- Phylum: Arthropoda
- Subphylum: Chelicerata
- Class: Arachnida
- Order: Araneae
- Infraorder: Mygalomorphae
- Family: Cyrtaucheniidae
- Genus: Ancylotrypa
- Species: A. nigriceps

Binomial name
- Ancylotrypa nigriceps (Purcell, 1902)

Synonyms
- Cyrtauchenius nigriceps Purcell, 1902; Pelmatorycter nigriceps Simon, 1903

= Ancylotrypa nigriceps =

Wafer-lid trapdoor spider

Species of spider

Ancylotrypa nigriceps is a species of spider of the genus Ancylotrypa. It is endemic to South Africa.

== Distribution ==
Ancylotrypa nigriceps is known from three provinces: Free State, Gauteng, and KwaZulu-Natal. The type locality is Johannesburg. The species occurs at elevations between 140 and 1762 meters above sea level.

== Habitat and ecology ==
Ground dwellers that live in silk-lined burrows. Males wander and are sampled from pitfall traps from the Grassland and Savanna biomes.

== Description ==
Only the male has been described for this species.

== Conservation ==
Listed as Least Concern on the South African Red List due to its wide geographical range. The species is protected in Erfenis Dam Nature Reserve, Amanzi Private Game Reserve, Suikerbosrand Nature Reserve, Van Riebeeck Nature Reserve, and Ndumo Game Reserve.
