= Acontius (spider) =

Scientific classification
- Domain: Eukaryota
- Kingdom: Animalia
- Phylum: Arthropoda
- Subphylum: Chelicerata
- Class: Arachnida
- Order: Araneae
- Infraorder: Mygalomorphae
- Family: Cyrtaucheniidae
- Genus: Acontius; Karsch, 1879

Type species
- A. hartmanni Karsch, 1879

Species
- 12, see text

Synonyms
- Aporoptychus Simon, 1886

Genus of spiders

Acontius is a genus of wafer trapdoor spiders that was first described by Ferdinand Karsch in 1879.

== Species ==
As of May 2019 it contains twelve species:

- Acontius aculeatus (Simon, 1903) – Equatorial Guinea
- Acontius africanus (Simon, 1889) – West Africa, Congo
- Acontius australis (Simon, 1886) – Argentina
- Acontius hartmanni Karsch, 1879 (type) – Angola
- Acontius humiliceps (Simon, 1907) – Equatorial Guinea (Bioko)
- Acontius kiriba Zonstein, 2018 – Burundi
- Acontius lamottei (Dresco, 1972) – Ivory Coast
- Acontius lawrencei (Roewer, 1953) – Congo
- Acontius lesserti (Roewer, 1953) – Congo
- Acontius machadoi (Lessert, 1938) – Congo
- Acontius nimba Zonstein, 2018 – Guinea
- Acontius stercoricola (Denis, 1955) – Guinea
