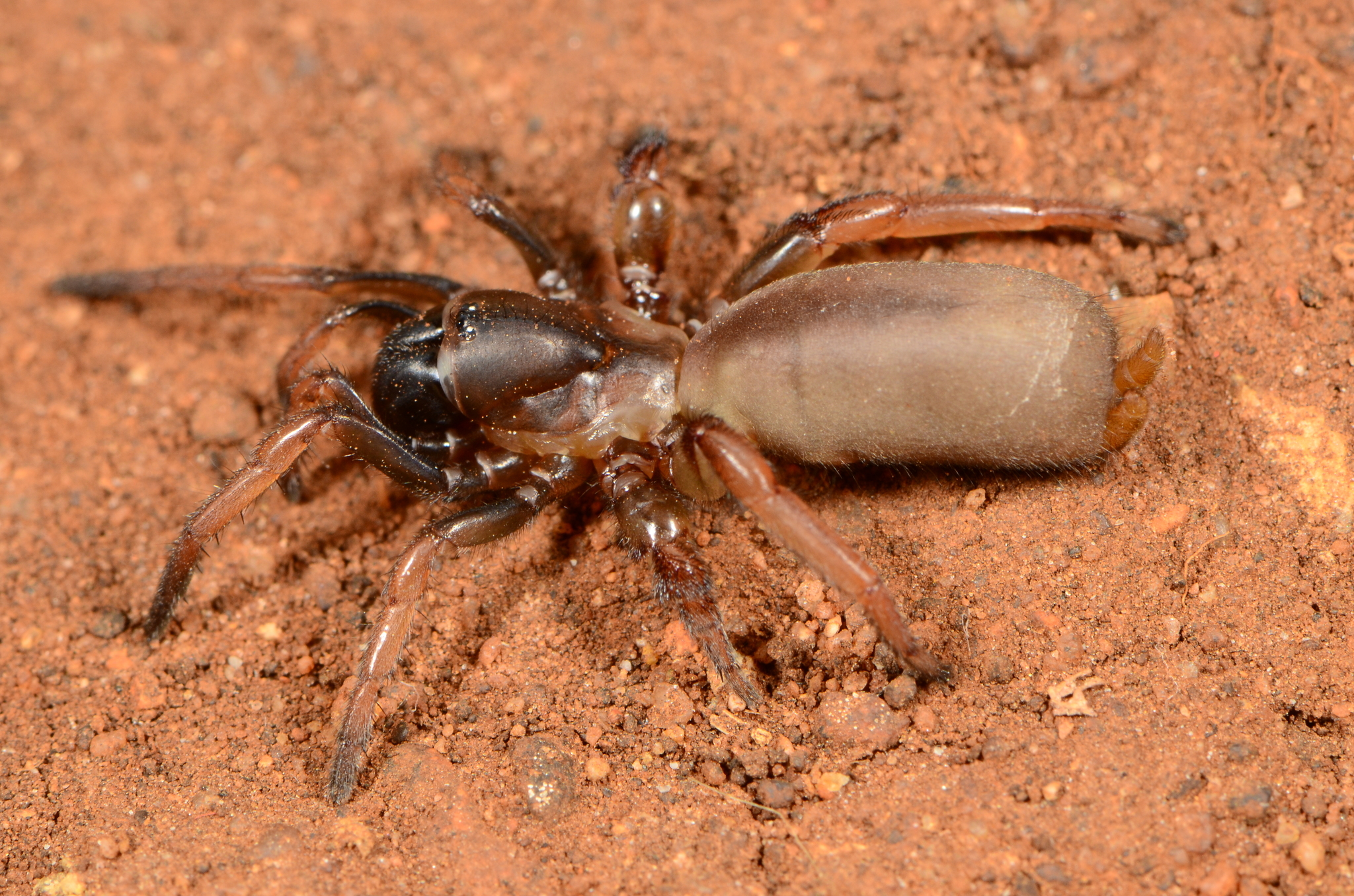
- female from South Africa
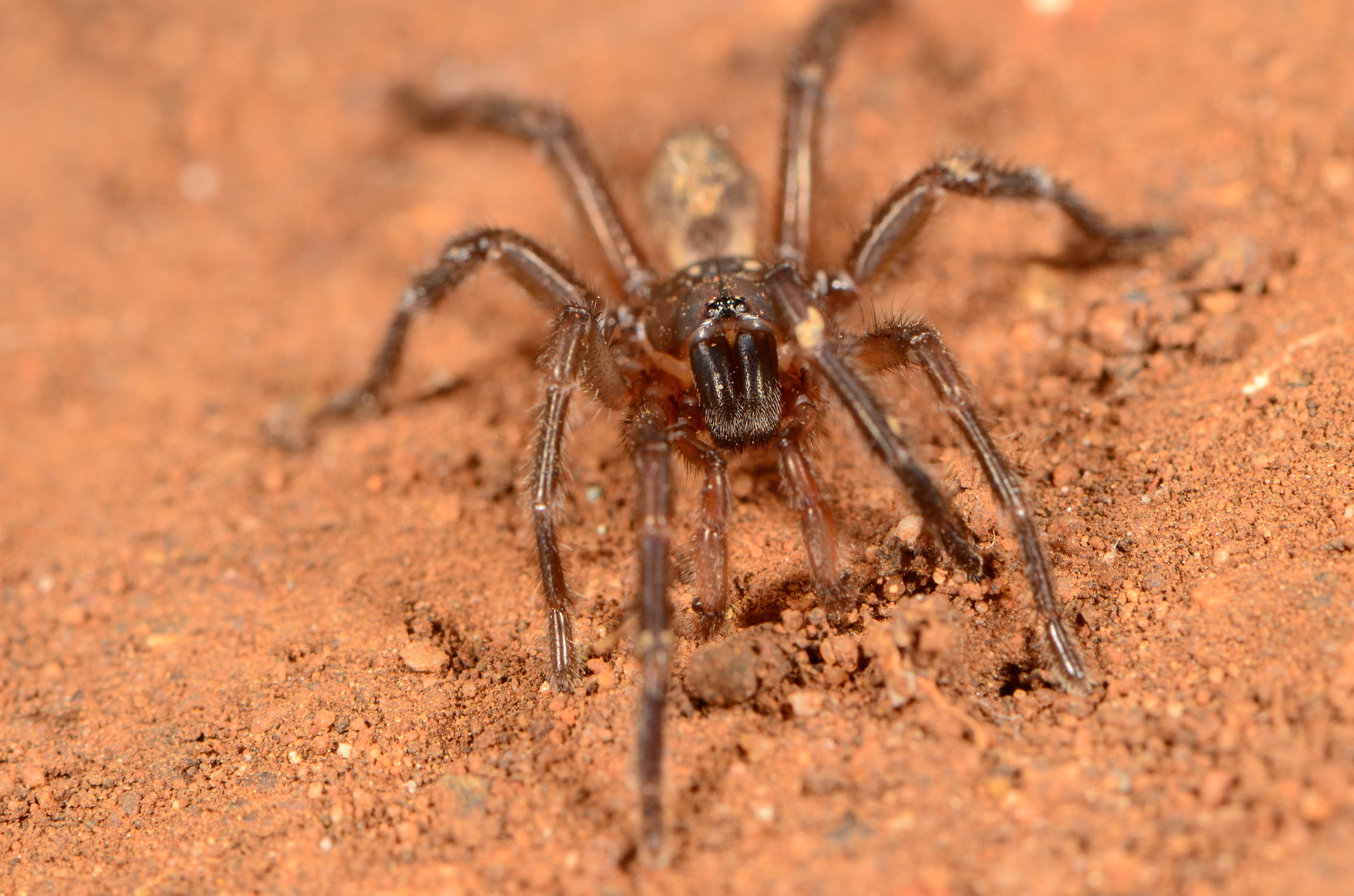
- adult male from South Africa

Scientific classification
- Kingdom: Animalia
- Phylum: Arthropoda
- Subphylum: Chelicerata
- Class: Arachnida
- Order: Araneae
- Infraorder: Mygalomorphae
- Family: Cyrtaucheniidae
- Genus: Ancylotrypa
- Species: A. elongata

Binomial name
- Ancylotrypa elongata Purcell, 1908

= Ancylotrypa elongata =

Long-bodied wafer-lid trapdoor spider

Species of spider

Ancylotrypa elongata, commonly known as the long-bodied wafer-lid trapdoor spider, is a species of spider of the genus Ancylotrypa. It occurs in southern Africa.

== Distribution ==
Ancylotrypa elongata is a southern African endemic known from Namibia, Botswana, and South Africa. In South Africa, it has been recorded from Limpopo and Northern Cape provinces (Lephalale, Western Soutpansberg, Turfloop, and Tswalu Game Reserve), at elevations between 1155 and 1523 meters above sea level.

== Taxonomy ==
The species was originally described from Botswana by Purcell in 1908. The male was first described, and the female was redescribed, by Zonstein et al. in 2018.

== Habitat and ecology ==
Ground dwellers that live in silk-lined burrows. The species has been sampled from the Savanna biome.

== Description ==
Both males and females have been described for this species.

== Conservation ==
Listed as Least Concern on the South African Red List due to its wide global geographical range. The species is protected in Tswalu Game Reserve.
