= Fufius =

Fufius may refer to:

- Fufius (spider)
- Fufius, nomen of the Fufia gens
  - Lucius Fufius (fl. 98 BC), Roman orator
  - Quintus Fufius Calenus (died 40 BC), Roman Republican politician and general
  - Gaius Fufius Geminus (consul 2 BC), Roman senator
  - Gaius Fufius Geminus (consul AD 29), Roman senator
