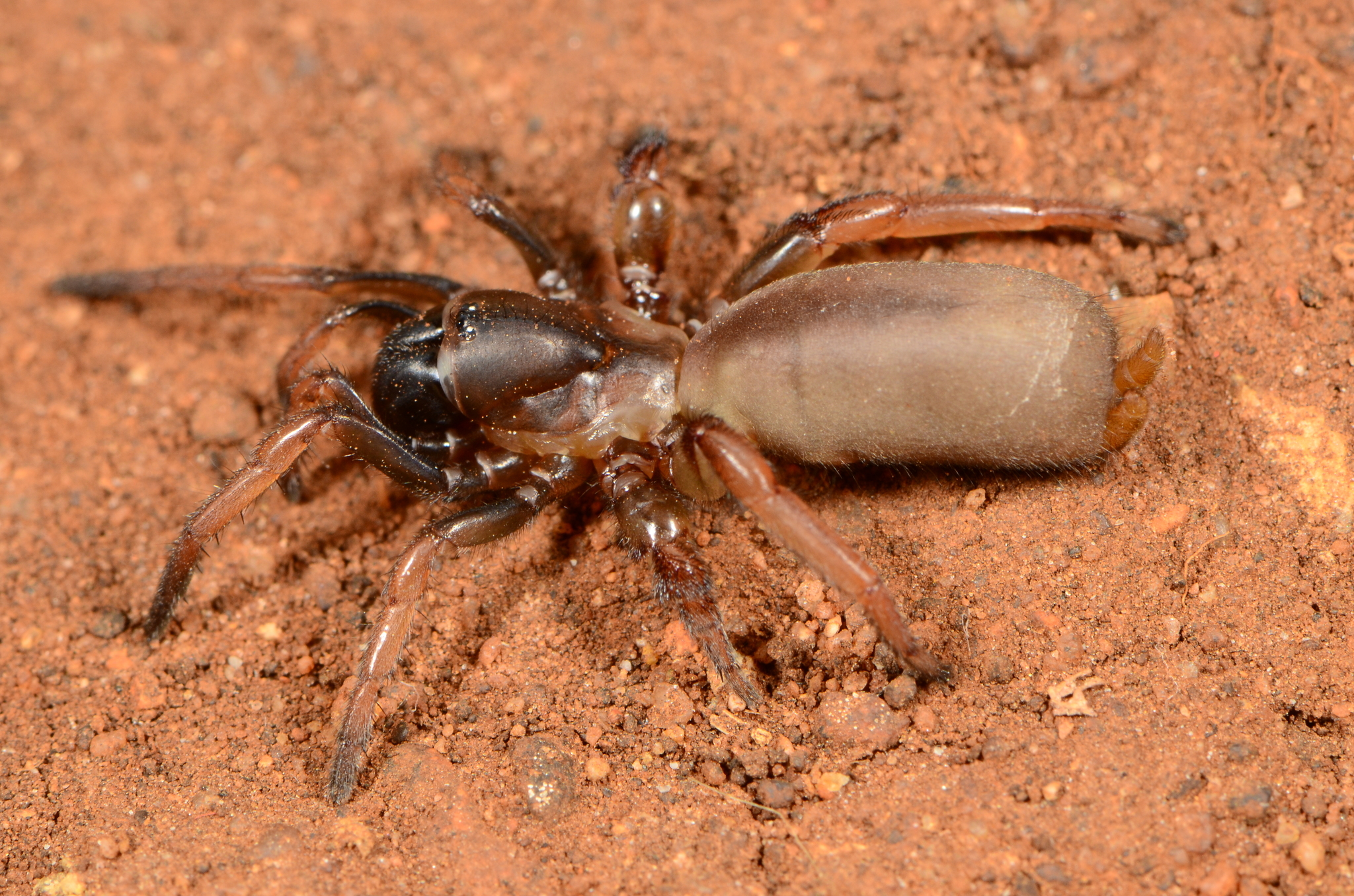
- female Ancylotrypa elongata
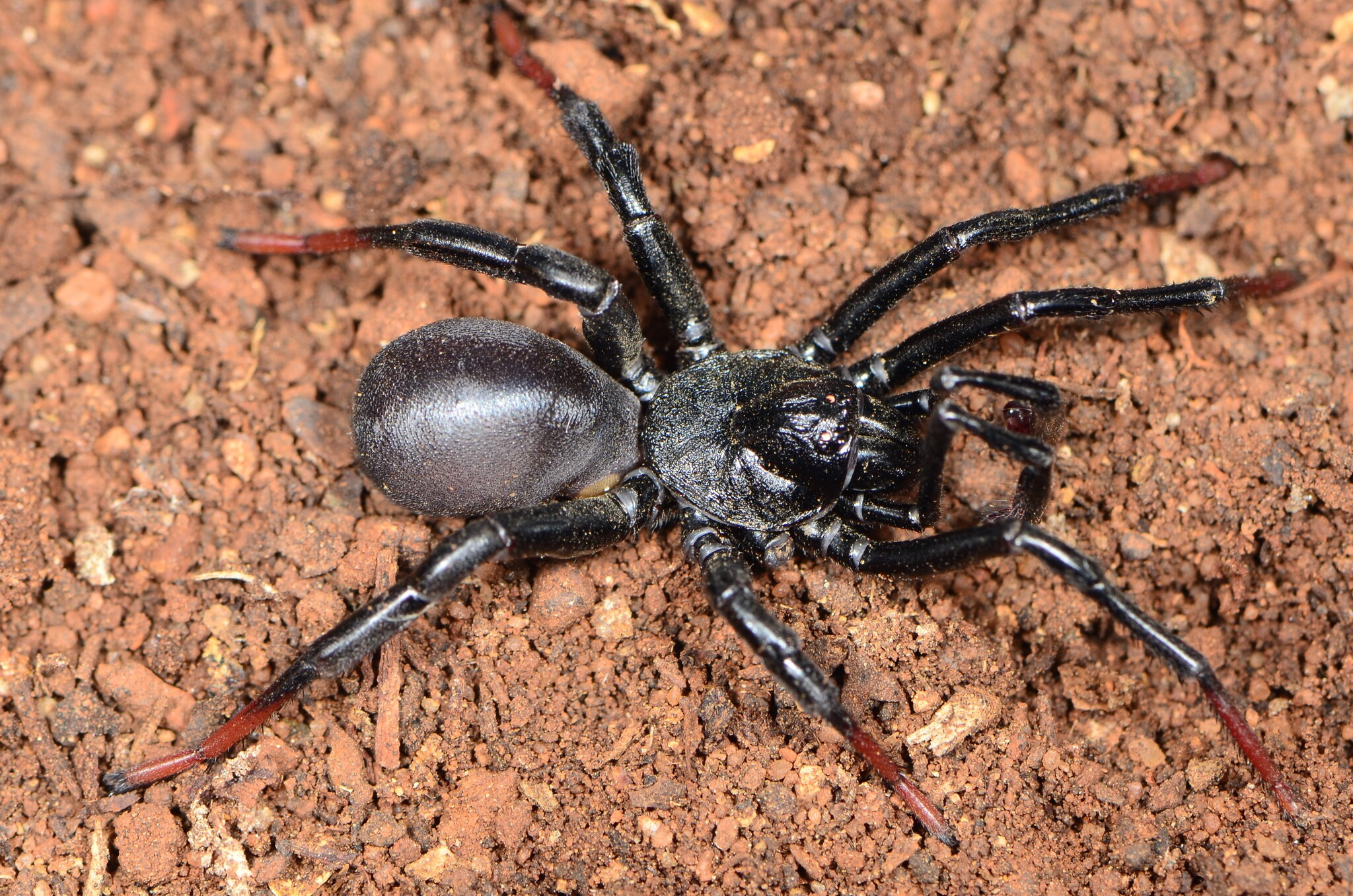
- male Ancylotrypa nigriceps

Scientific classification
- Kingdom: Animalia
- Phylum: Arthropoda
- Subphylum: Chelicerata
- Class: Arachnida
- Order: Araneae
- Infraorder: Mygalomorphae
- Clade: Avicularioidea
- Family: Cyrtaucheniidae; Simon, 1892

Diversity
- 6 genera, 109 species
- blue: reported countries (WSC)

= Wafer-lid trapdoor spider =

Wafer-lid trapdoor spider Temporal range: Neogene–present

Family of spiders

The family Cyrtaucheniidae, known as wafer-lid trapdoor spiders, are a widespread family of mygalomorph spiders.

== Description ==
Wafer-lid spiders are generally large and range in color between light brown and black. Their eyes are placed in two rows, either in a rectangular position or with the back row wider apart. They lack the thornlike spines on tarsi and metatarsi I and II (the two outermost leg segments) found in true trapdoor spiders (Ctenizidae).

Many, but not all, make wafer-like doors to their burrows, while others build the cork-like doors found commonly in the true trapdoor spiders.

== Distribution ==
The family is well represented in South America, and Africa. A currently undescribed genus in the western United States may hold an altitude record for the family, being found up to over 11,000 feet (3,400 meters). The genus Anemesia is found only in Central Asia, and Cyrtauchenius reaches from Algeria north to Italy, with one species found in the USA. Angka is endemic to the cloud forest of Doi Inthanon, Thailand.

== Genera ==
The former subfamily Euctenizinae from the US and Mexico were promoted to family rank as Euctenizidae in 2012, and are now considered more closely related to Idiopidae. Further changes to the circumscription of the family were made in 2020.

As of January 2026, this family includes six genera and 109 species:

- Acontius Karsch, 1879 – Africa, Argentina
- Ancylotrypa Simon, 1889 – Africa
- Anemesia Pocock, 1895 – Central Asia, Iran
- Bolostromoides Schiapelli & Gerschman, 1945 – Venezuela
- Bolostromus Ausserer, 1875 – Cuba, Dominican Republic, St. Vincent, Costa Rica, Panama, Mexico, Colombia, Ecuador, Venezuela
- Cyrtauchenius Thorell, 1869 – Algeria, United States

Genera which have been reclassified to other families include:

- Amblyocarenum Simon, 1892 → Nemesiidae
- Angka Raven & Schwendinger, 1995 → Microstigmatidae
- Homostola Simon, 1892 → Bemmeridae
- Fufius Simon, 1888 → Rhytidicolidae

== See also ==
- Spider families
