= List of Bemmeridae species =

This page lists all described species of the spider family Bemmeridae accepted by the World Spider Catalog as of January 2021:

== Atmetochilus ==
Atmetochilus Simon, 1887

- A. atriceps Pocock, 1900 — Myanmar
- A. fossor Simon, 1887 (type) — Myanmar
- A. koponeni Zonstein & Marusik, 2016 — Indonesia (Sumatra)
- A. lehtineni Zonstein & Marusik, 2016 — Indonesia (Sumatra)
- A. songsangchotei Kunsete & Warrit, 2020 — Thailand
- A. sumatranus Zonstein & Marusik, 2016 — Indonesia (Sumatra)

== Damarchus ==
Damarchus Thorell, 1891

- D. assamensis Hirst, 1909 — India
- D. bifidus Gravely, 1935 — India
- D. cavernicola Abraham, 1924 — Malaysia
- D. montanus (Thorell, 1890) — Indonesia (Sumatra)
- D. oatesi Thorell, 1895 — Myanmar
- D. workmani Thorell, 1891 (type) — Singapore

== Homostola ==
Homostola Simon, 1892

- H. abernethyi (Purcell, 1903) — South Africa
- H. pardalina (Hewitt, 1913) — South Africa
- H. reticulata (Purcell, 1902) — South Africa
- H. vulpecula Simon, 1892 (type) — South Africa
- H. zebrina Purcell, 1902 — South Africa

== Spiroctenus ==
Spiroctenus Simon, 1889

- S. armatus Hewitt, 1913 — South Africa
- S. broomi Tucker, 1917 — South Africa
- S. cambierae (Purcell, 1902) — South Africa
- S. coeruleus Lawrence, 1952 — South Africa
- S. collinus (Pocock, 1900) — South Africa
- S. curvipes Hewitt, 1919 — South Africa
- S. exilis Lawrence, 1938 — South Africa
- S. flavopunctatus (Purcell, 1903) — South Africa
- S. fossorius (Pocock, 1900) — South Africa
- S. fuligineus (Pocock, 1902) — South Africa
- S. gooldi (Purcell, 1903) — South Africa
- S. inermis (Purcell, 1902) — South Africa
- S. latus Purcell, 1904 — South Africa
- S. lightfooti (Purcell, 1902) — South Africa
- S. lignicola Lawrence, 1937 — South Africa
- S. londinensis Hewitt, 1919 — South Africa
- S. marleyi Hewitt, 1919 — South Africa
- S. minor (Hewitt, 1913) — South Africa
- S. pallidipes Purcell, 1904 — South Africa
- S. pardalina (Simon, 1903) — South Africa
- S. pectiniger (Simon, 1903) — South Africa
- S. personatus Simon, 1889 (type) — Southern Africa
- S. pilosus Tucker, 1917 — South Africa
- S. punctatus Hewitt, 1916 — South Africa
- S. purcelli Tucker, 1917 — South Africa
- S. sagittarius (Purcell, 1902) — South Africa
- S. schreineri (Purcell, 1903) — South Africa
- S. spinipalpis Hewitt, 1919 — South Africa
- S. tricalcaratus (Purcell, 1903) — South Africa
- S. validus (Purcell, 1902) — South Africa
