= Bessia =

Bessia is the scientific name of several genera of organisms and may also refer to:

- Bessia Raf., a genus of plants now regarded as a synonym of Corypha
- Bessia Pocock, 1900, a genus of spiders now regarded as a synonym of Spiroctenus
