= Spiroctenus pallidipes =

Touws River Spiroctenus Trapdoor Spider

Scientific classification
- Kingdom: Animalia
- Phylum: Arthropoda
- Subphylum: Chelicerata
- Class: Arachnida
- Order: Araneae
- Infraorder: Mygalomorphae
- Family: Bemmeridae
- Genus: Spiroctenus
- Species: S. pallidipes

Binomial name
- Spiroctenus pallidipes Purcell, 1904

Species of spider

Spiroctenus pallidipes is a species of spider in the family Bemmeridae. It is endemic to the Western Cape province of South Africa.

== Distribution ==
Spiroctenus pallidipes is known only from the type locality at Worcester, at the Touws River Station.

== Habitat ==
The species inhabits the Fynbos Biome and constructs vertical burrows that are enlarged at a depth of 18-23 centimeters into a chamber, with an additional small chamber in the upper wall used as a retreat during danger. The burrows lack a lid or turret.

== Description ==
Both sexes of Spiroctenus pallidipes are known to science. The spider is pale yellowish in color. The carapace with chelicerae is reddish yellow, with the rest being faintly infuscated. The opisthosoma shows a well-defined pattern composed of a series of transverse dark or purplish stripes united by a median longitudinal stripe. The legs are very pale yellowish. The total length is 12.5 millimeters.

== Conservation ==
The species is listed as Data Deficient for taxonomic reasons, as more sampling is needed to collect females and determine the species range.
