= Spiroctenus armatus =

Port Alfred Spiroctenus Trapdoor Spider

Scientific classification
- Kingdom: Animalia
- Phylum: Arthropoda
- Subphylum: Chelicerata
- Class: Arachnida
- Order: Araneae
- Infraorder: Mygalomorphae
- Family: Bemmeridae
- Genus: Spiroctenus
- Species: S. armatus

Binomial name
- Spiroctenus armatus Hewitt, 1913

Species of spider

Spiroctenus armatus is a species of spider in the family Bemmeridae. It is endemic to the Eastern Cape province of South Africa.

== Distribution ==
Spiroctenus armatus is known only from the type locality on the west bank of the Kowie River, 4.5 kilometers from Port Alfred.

== Habitat ==
The species inhabits the Thicket Biome and was originally collected from a trapdoor burrow.

== Description ==
Only males of Spiroctenus armatus are known to science. The carapace is dark reddish brown, becoming almost black in front and on the chelicerae. The pedipalps and legs are reddish brown with darker basal joints, especially the trochanters.

The opisthosoma is pale yellowish above with an irregular black pattern, while the lower surfaces are paler than the upper. The metatarsus I is curved near the base with a distinctly concave underside. The inner surface bears two large curved spines, the outer surface has two straight spines inferiorly, and the apex has a pair of spines inferiorly.

== Conservation ==
The species is listed as Data Deficient for taxonomic reasons, as females remain unknown and the full species range requires further study.
