= Spiroctenus latus =

Wellington Spiroctenus Trapdoor Spider

Scientific classification
- Kingdom: Animalia
- Phylum: Arthropoda
- Subphylum: Chelicerata
- Class: Arachnida
- Order: Araneae
- Infraorder: Mygalomorphae
- Family: Bemmeridae
- Genus: Spiroctenus
- Species: S. latus

Binomial name
- Spiroctenus latus Purcell, 1904

Species of spider

Spiroctenus latus is a species of spider in the family Bemmeridae. It is endemic to the Western Cape province of South Africa.

== Distribution ==
Spiroctenus latus is known only from the type locality at Wellington.

== Habitat ==
The species inhabits the Fynbos Biome as a ground-dwelling burrow constructor.

== Description ==
Only males of Spiroctenus latus are known to science. The carapace is reddish brown with blackened margins. The legs are darkened with a brownish tinge. The opisthosoma is pale yellow dorsally and laterally with thick black reticulation. The total length is 15 mm.

== Conservation ==
The species is listed as Data Deficient for taxonomic reasons, as females remain unknown and the full species range requires further study.
