= Spiroctenus inermis =

Clanwilliam Spiroctenus Trapdoor Spider

Scientific classification
- Kingdom: Animalia
- Phylum: Arthropoda
- Subphylum: Chelicerata
- Class: Arachnida
- Order: Araneae
- Infraorder: Mygalomorphae
- Family: Bemmeridae
- Genus: Spiroctenus
- Species: S. inermis

Binomial name
- Spiroctenus inermis (Purcell, 1902)

Synonyms
- Hermachastes inermis Purcell, 1902

Species of spider

Spiroctenus inermis is a species of spider in the family Bemmeridae. It occurs in the Western Cape and Northern Cape provinces of South Africa.

== Distribution ==
Spiroctenus inermis has been recorded from Clanwilliam Pakhuisberg in the Western Cape, and Nieuwoudtville and Oorlogskloof Nature Reserve in the Northern Cape.

== Habitat ==
The species inhabits the Fynbos and Succulent Karoo biomes as a ground-dwelling burrow constructor.

== Description ==
Only males of Spiroctenus inermis are known to science. The carapace is pale ochraceous with the cephalic region darkened with a brownish tinge and a longitudinal ochraceous stripe extending from each side of the ocular area. The chelicerae are pale ochraceous with infuscate lines. The legs are pale ochraceous with femora weakly darkened with brownish lines above. The sternum and underside of coxae are pale yellowish. The opisthosoma is pale yellowish with the upper surface and usually the posterior part of the sides strongly blackened, showing numerous pale yellowish dots and spots but lacking well-defined obliquely transverse dark stripes. The total length is 12-14 millimeters.

== Conservation ==
The species is listed as Data Deficient for taxonomic reasons, as females remain unknown and the full species range requires further study.
