= Spiroctenus exilis =

Port Edward Spiroctenus Trapdoor Spider

Scientific classification
- Kingdom: Animalia
- Phylum: Arthropoda
- Subphylum: Chelicerata
- Class: Arachnida
- Order: Araneae
- Infraorder: Mygalomorphae
- Family: Bemmeridae
- Genus: Spiroctenus
- Species: S. exilis

Binomial name
- Spiroctenus exilis Lawrence, 1938

Species of spider

Spiroctenus exilis is a species of spider in the family Bemmeridae. It is endemic to KwaZulu-Natal province of South Africa.

== Distribution ==
Spiroctenus exilis is known only from the type locality at Port Edward.

== Habitat ==
The species inhabits the Indian Ocean Coastal Belt Biome as a ground-dwelling burrow constructor.

== Description ==
Only males of Spiroctenus exilis are known to science. The carapace is orange in color and the legs are yellow. The opisthosoma is blackish brown with light spots. The total length is 12 millimeters.

== Conservation ==
The species is listed as Data Deficient for taxonomic reasons, as females remain unknown and the full species range requires further study.
