= Spiroctenus marleyi =

Marley’s Spiroctenus Trapdoor Spider

Scientific classification
- Kingdom: Animalia
- Phylum: Arthropoda
- Subphylum: Chelicerata
- Class: Arachnida
- Order: Araneae
- Infraorder: Mygalomorphae
- Family: Bemmeridae
- Genus: Spiroctenus
- Species: S. marleyi

Binomial name
- Spiroctenus marleyi Hewitt, 1919

Species of spider

Spiroctenus marleyi is a species of spider in the family Bemmeridae. It is endemic to KwaZulu-Natal province of South Africa.

== Distribution ==
Spiroctenus marleyi is known only from the type locality at Eshowe.

== Habitat ==
The species inhabits the Indian Ocean Coastal Belt and Savanna biomes as a ground-dwelling burrow constructor.

== Description ==
Both sexes of Spiroctenus marleyi are known to science. Males have dull brown appendages and a dark chestnut brown carapace. The opisthosoma is infuscated above. The total length of males is 10.5 millimeters. Females have a brown carapace and appendages. The abdomen is infuscated above with numerous unarranged pale spots that break up the original dark tree pattern. The total length of females is 15 millimeters.

== Conservation ==
The species is listed as Data Deficient, as more sampling is needed to determine the species range.
