= Homostola abernethyi =

Abernethy's Wafer-Lid Trapdoor Spider

Scientific classification
- Kingdom: Animalia
- Phylum: Arthropoda
- Subphylum: Chelicerata
- Class: Arachnida
- Order: Araneae
- Infraorder: Mygalomorphae
- Family: Bemmeridae
- Genus: Homostola
- Species: H. abernethyi

Binomial name
- Homostola abernethyi (Purcell, 1903)

Synonyms
- Paromostola abernethyi Purcell, 1903

Species of spider

Homostola abernethyi is a species of spider in the family Bemmeridae. It is endemic to the Eastern Cape province of South Africa.

== Distribution ==
Homostola abernethyi is known from two localities in the Eastern Cape: Kentani and Mkhambathi Nature Reserve. The species occurs at elevations ranging from 1 to 424 meters above sea level.

== Habitat ==
The species inhabits forest areas where it lives in leaf litter. It has been recorded from the Indian Ocean Coastal Belt, Savanna and Thicket biomes.

== Description ==
Only females of Homostola abernethyi are known to science. The carapace and legs are pale yellowish in color, with the thoracic portion and lateral borders showing a light brownish tinge. The ocular area is more than twice as wide as long. The labium bears 9 teeth arranged in 3 rows. The tarsi of legs I and II are scopulate to the base. The total length is 13.1 millimeters.

== Conservation ==
The species is listed as Data Deficient due to taxonomic uncertainty, as males remain unknown and the full species range is undetermined. It is protected within Mkhambathi Nature Reserve.
