= Spiroctenus schreineri =

Schreiner’s Spiroctenus Trapdoor Spider

Scientific classification
- Kingdom: Animalia
- Phylum: Arthropoda
- Subphylum: Chelicerata
- Class: Arachnida
- Order: Araneae
- Infraorder: Mygalomorphae
- Family: Bemmeridae
- Genus: Spiroctenus
- Species: S. schreineri

Binomial name
- Spiroctenus schreineri (Purcell, 1903)

Synonyms
- Hermachastes schreineri Purcell, 1903

Species of spider

Spiroctenus schreineri is a species of spider in the family Bemmeridae. It occurs in the Western Cape and Northern Cape provinces of South Africa.

== Distribution ==
Spiroctenus schreineri has been recorded from farms near Hanover in the Northern Cape, including Poortjiesfontein and Vlagkop, and from Karoo National Park in the Western Cape.

== Habitat ==
The species inhabits the Nama Karoo Biome and constructs burrows about 10-15 centimeters deep. The burrows are usually straight, though sometimes have a forked entrance and blind side chamber. The turrets are decorated with sticks and grass seeds bound together by webbing and project slightly above ground level. The hole is typically open at the top, though occasionally a fine film of web may stretch across the turret top.

== Description ==
Only females of Spiroctenus schreineri are known to science. The carapace is pale yellowish or greenish yellow, weakly infuscated in places, particularly along the lateral margins of the cephalic region. The femora of legs are pale greenish yellow, with the remaining distal segments yellow. The patellae and tibiae are often bright yellow.

The opisthosoma is pale yellowish with the upper surface brownish black in the anterior half. The posterior part is strongly marked with the usual tree-pattern, with the posterior bars not reaching the ventral surface in front of the spinnerets. The ventral surface of the body is pale yellowish, with the abdomen generally showing a brownish black spot in front of each lateral spinneret. The total length is 23 millimeters.

== Conservation ==
The species is listed as Data Deficient for taxonomic reasons, as males remain unknown and the full species range requires further study. It is protected in Karoo National Park.
