= Spiroctenus fossorius =

Port Elizabeth Spiroctenus Trapdoor Spider

Scientific classification
- Kingdom: Animalia
- Phylum: Arthropoda
- Subphylum: Chelicerata
- Class: Arachnida
- Order: Araneae
- Infraorder: Mygalomorphae
- Family: Bemmeridae
- Genus: Spiroctenus
- Species: S. fossorius

Binomial name
- Spiroctenus fossorius (Pocock, 1900)

Synonyms
- Bessia fossoria Pocock, 1900; Bessia fossorix Bonnet, 1955; Spiroctenus fossorina Raven, 1985

Species of spider

Spiroctenus fossorius is a species of spider in the family Bemmeridae. It is endemic to the Eastern Cape province of South Africa.

== Distribution ==
Spiroctenus fossorius is known only from the type locality at Port Elizabeth.

== Habitat ==
The species inhabits the Thicket Biome as a ground-dwelling burrow constructor.

== Description ==
Only females of Spiroctenus fossorius are known to science. The labium and maxillae each bear approximately 20 cuspules. The paired tarsal claws have 3-4 teeth on both inner and outer margins. The posterior sternal sigilla are subcentral. The carapace and legs are pale reddish in color. The total length is 12 millimeters.

== Conservation ==
The species is listed as Data Deficient for taxonomic reasons, as males remain unknown and the full species range requires further study.
