= Spiroctenus personatus =

Scientific classification
- Kingdom: Animalia
- Phylum: Arthropoda
- Subphylum: Chelicerata
- Class: Arachnida
- Order: Araneae
- Infraorder: Mygalomorphae
- Family: Bemmeridae
- Genus: Spiroctenus
- Species: S. personatus

Binomial name
- Spiroctenus personatus Simon, 1889

Species of spider

Spiroctenus personatus is a spider in the family Bemmeridae, found in Southern Africa. It was first described in 1889 by Eugène Simon. The male specimen that Simon described was from Maputo Bay, which he called "Baie de Delagoa", in Mozambique. It was about 20 mm long. Its cephalothorax was light grey with a black triangular head region and a brownish centre. The fovea was large. The abdomen was short and oval, the upper surface being black with yellowish markings, the lower pale brick-coloured. The legs were brownish-olive with reddish patellae. The palpal bulb was pear-shaped with a very delicate long embolus.
