= Spiroctenus tricalcaratus =

Stompneus Spiroctenus Trapdoor Spider

Scientific classification
- Kingdom: Animalia
- Phylum: Arthropoda
- Subphylum: Chelicerata
- Class: Arachnida
- Order: Araneae
- Infraorder: Mygalomorphae
- Family: Bemmeridae
- Genus: Spiroctenus
- Species: S. tricalcaratus

Binomial name
- Spiroctenus tricalcaratus (Purcell, 1903)

Synonyms
- Hermachastes tricalcaratus Purcell, 1903

Species of spider

Spiroctenus tricalcaratus is a species of spider in the family Bemmeridae. It is endemic to the Western Cape province of South Africa.

== Distribution ==
Spiroctenus tricalcaratus has been recorded from several localities including Malmesbury, Soldaten Post, St. Helena Bay Stompneus, and Steenberg's Cove. All collections were made in the early 1900s.

== Habitat ==
The species inhabits the Fynbos Biome as a ground-dwelling burrow constructor.

== Description ==
Only males of Spiroctenus tricalcaratus are known to science. The spider is pale ochraceous in color. The carapace shows faint greenish or fuscous patches radiating inwards from the margins. The cephalic region is yellowish with a dark stripe along the middle and one at each lateral margin.

The opisthosoma has a median black or blackish brown stripe that is abbreviated posteriorly and widened anteriorly into a large patch. This is flanked on each side by a row of short, obliquely transverse, similarly colored stripes that do not unite with the median stripe. The underside shows a dark spot slightly in front of the larger spinnerets. The sides have a larger spot just above these spinnerets but are otherwise without spots or stripes. The distal part of the first leg is reddish. The total length is 11-14 millimeters.

== Conservation ==
The species is listed as Data Deficient for taxonomic reasons, as females remain unknown and the current species range requires further study.
