= Spiroctenus purcelli =

Purcell’s Spiroctenus Trapdoor Spider

Scientific classification
- Kingdom: Animalia
- Phylum: Arthropoda
- Subphylum: Chelicerata
- Class: Arachnida
- Order: Araneae
- Infraorder: Mygalomorphae
- Family: Bemmeridae
- Genus: Spiroctenus
- Species: S. purcelli

Binomial name
- Spiroctenus purcelli Tucker, 1917

Species of spider

Spiroctenus purcelli is a species of spider in the family Bemmeridae. It is endemic to the Western Cape province of South Africa.

== Distribution ==
Spiroctenus purcelli is known only from the type locality at Simonstown.

== Habitat ==
The species inhabits the Fynbos Biome as a ground-dwelling burrow constructor.

== Description ==
Only males of Spiroctenus purcelli are known to science. The carapace and upper surface of femora are dark infused with brown. The cephalic region is slightly darker, with a line down the center to the fovea. The underside of femora is lighter and tinged with olive. The legs are slightly browner and darker distally. The pedipalps are lighter distally and tinged with olive. The entire underside is ochraceous. The upper surface of the opisthosoma is strongly infuscated, especially anteriorly. Posteriorly, the infuscation takes the form of a central dark line and 3-4 distinct oblique dark lines branching from it. The sides of the abdomen are clear ochraceous. There is a small dark spot on the underside below each posterior spinneret. The total length is 19.5 millimeters.

== Conservation ==
The species is listed as Data Deficient for taxonomic reasons, as females remain unknown and the full species range requires further study.
