= Spiroctenus collinus =

Table Mountain Spiroctenus Trapdoor Spider

Scientific classification
- Kingdom: Animalia
- Phylum: Arthropoda
- Subphylum: Chelicerata
- Class: Arachnida
- Order: Araneae
- Infraorder: Mygalomorphae
- Family: Bemmeridae
- Genus: Spiroctenus
- Species: S. collinus

Binomial name
- Spiroctenus collinus (Pocock, 1900)

Synonyms
- Hermachastes collinus Pocock, 1900

Species of spider

Spiroctenus collinus is a species of spider in the family Bemmeridae. It is endemic to the Western Cape province of South Africa.

== Distribution ==
Spiroctenus collinus is known only from the Cape Peninsula, with records from Camps Bay, Kalk Bay, Table Mountain National Park including Signal Hill and Silvermine Nature Reserve, and Tulbagh.

== Habitat ==
The species inhabits the Fynbos Biome and constructs simple burrows with a turret around the entrance.

== Description ==
Both sexes of Spiroctenus collinus are known to science. The carapace is ochraceous with deep olive infuscations in the cephalic region and posterior carapace, and to a lesser extent in lateral radiations from the fovea. The legs are pale ochraceous below, darkened with a brownish tinge above on the femora, and browner from the patellae onwards. The pedipalps are lighter and tinged olivaceous. The opisthosoma is darkened with a brownish tinge above, with testaceous markings posteriorly that bring out central and oblique dark lines. The sides and underside are pale testaceous with a distinct green tinge. The total length is 18 millimeters for females and 12 millimeters for males.

== Conservation ==
The species is listed as Data Deficient, as more sampling is needed to determine its current range. Historic collections from lowland sites may have been lost to urban development, but the species is protected in Table Mountain National Park.
