= Homostola reticulata =

Swellendam Wafer-Lid Trapdoor Spider

Scientific classification
- Kingdom: Animalia
- Phylum: Arthropoda
- Subphylum: Chelicerata
- Class: Arachnida
- Order: Araneae
- Infraorder: Mygalomorphae
- Family: Bemmeridae
- Genus: Homostola
- Species: H. reticulata

Binomial name
- Homostola reticulata (Purcell, 1902)

Synonyms
- Stictogaster reticulatus Purcell, 1902

Species of spider

Homostola reticulata is a species of spider in the family Bemmeridae. It is endemic to the Western Cape province of South Africa.

== Distribution ==
Homostola reticulata is known from several localities in the Western Cape, including De Hoop Nature Reserve, Swellendam, Bontebok National Park, and Kogelberg Nature Reserve.

== Habitat ==
This species is a free-living ground dweller found in leaf litter within the Fynbos Biome.

== Description ==
Only females of Homostola reticulata are known to science. In preserved specimens, the carapace appears greenish yellow with the cephalic region and area around the fovea showing brownish yellow coloration and faint brownish darkening. The legs are greenish yellow with the upper surfaces of the patellae and tibiae, and often the distal segments, being pale ochraceous. The opisthosoma is covered with an irregular network of purplish black markings, within which an irregular median stripe may be discernible. The underside shows scattered black marks on the posterior half. The labium bears approximately 25 teeth arranged in 4-5 rows. The total length is 20 millimeters.

== Conservation ==
The species is listed as Data Deficient for taxonomic reasons, as males remain unknown and the full species range requires further study. It is protected in De Hoop Nature Reserve, Bontebok National Park, and Kogelberg Nature Reserve.
