= Spiroctenus londinensis =

East London Spiroctenus Trapdoor Spider

Scientific classification
- Kingdom: Animalia
- Phylum: Arthropoda
- Subphylum: Chelicerata
- Class: Arachnida
- Order: Araneae
- Infraorder: Mygalomorphae
- Family: Bemmeridae
- Genus: Spiroctenus
- Species: S. londinensis

Binomial name
- Spiroctenus londinensis Hewitt, 1919

Species of spider

Spiroctenus londinensis is a species of spider in the family Bemmeridae. It is endemic to the Eastern Cape province of South Africa.

== Distribution ==
Spiroctenus londinensis is known only from the type locality at East London.

== Habitat ==
The species inhabits the Thicket Biome and constructs burrows passing downwards for 18-20 centimeters, with the lower portion free of silk. The burrow lids have a hinge down the middle, forming two distinct halves.

== Description ==
Both sexes of Spiroctenus londinensis are known to science. Males have a dark brown carapace with blackish brown chelicerae and femora of legs and pedipalps. The remaining segments of the legs and palps are reddish brown except the tarsi and metatarsi which are darker, with those of the first two pairs being about the same tint as the carapace. The upper surface of the opisthosoma is dull yellowish with infuscations that are somewhat indefinitely shown, being obscured by black bristly hairs. In the posterior half there are distinct indications of thin dark cross stripes. The sternum and lower surfaces of appendages are pale reddish brown, with the abdomen pale below. The total length of males is 22 millimeters. Females have pale brown pedipalps and legs that become dark on the distal segments. The carapace is castaneous and the chelicerae are blackish brown. The abdomen is infuscated above with numerous small indistinct pale spots, and pale ventrally. The total length of females is 27 millimeters.

== Conservation ==
The species is listed as Data Deficient, as more sampling is needed to determine the species range.
