= Spiroctenus curvipes =

Utrecht Spiroctenus Trapdoor Spider

Scientific classification
- Kingdom: Animalia
- Phylum: Arthropoda
- Subphylum: Chelicerata
- Class: Arachnida
- Order: Araneae
- Infraorder: Mygalomorphae
- Family: Bemmeridae
- Genus: Spiroctenus
- Species: S. curvipes

Binomial name
- Spiroctenus curvipes Hewitt, 1919

Species of spider

Spiroctenus curvipes is a species of spider in the family Bemmeridae. It is endemic to KwaZulu-Natal province of South Africa.

== Distribution ==
Spiroctenus curvipes is known only from the type locality at Klipspruit, Utrecht.

== Habitat ==
The species inhabits the Savanna Biome as a ground-dwelling burrow constructor.

== Description ==
Both sexes of Spiroctenus curvipes are known to science. Males have the anterior portion and sides of the carapace pale with a reddish tinge, while the hinder portion is dark. The legs are dark, almost black, except the coxae of the first two pairs which are reddish yellow. The sternum and all coxae are reddish yellow below. The opisthosoma is dark above with indistinct darker cross stripes broken in the middle, and pale below. The total length of males is 11 millimeters. Females have a pale olivaceous carapace and legs, but the mesial area of the cephalic region has sparsely scattered black hairs. The abdomen shows dark oblique cross stripes on each side above except in front where it is uniformly infuscated, but is pale ventrally and laterally. The total length of females is 21 millimeters.

== Conservation ==
The species is listed as Data Deficient, as more sampling is needed to determine the species range.
