= Spiroctenus punctatus =

Zululand Spiroctenus Trapdoor Spider

Scientific classification
- Kingdom: Animalia
- Phylum: Arthropoda
- Subphylum: Chelicerata
- Class: Arachnida
- Order: Araneae
- Infraorder: Mygalomorphae
- Family: Bemmeridae
- Genus: Spiroctenus
- Species: S. punctatus

Binomial name
- Spiroctenus punctatus Hewitt, 1916

Species of spider

Spiroctenus punctatus is a species of spider in the family Bemmeridae. It is endemic to KwaZulu-Natal province of South Africa.

== Distribution ==
Spiroctenus punctatus was originally described with the type locality given only as Zululand, but has been recollected from Ngome State Forest.

== Habitat ==
The species inhabits the Savanna Biome as a ground-dwelling burrow constructor. Specimens from Ngome State Forest were collected in pitfall traps.

== Description ==
Only females of Spiroctenus punctatus are known to science. The carapace, chelicerae, and femora of pedipalps and legs are dark olive-brown, while the patellae and more distal segments of palps and legs are paler. The opisthosoma is dark above with numerous small pale spots of irregular size. The cheliceral furrow has 11-12 promarginal teeth and six denticles. The labium bears 31 cuspules. The total length is 16 millimeters.

== Conservation ==
The species is listed as Data Deficient for taxonomic reasons, as males remain unknown and the full species range requires further study.
