= Spiroctenus lightfooti =

Lightfoot’s Spiroctenus Trapdoor Spider

Scientific classification
- Kingdom: Animalia
- Phylum: Arthropoda
- Subphylum: Chelicerata
- Class: Arachnida
- Order: Araneae
- Infraorder: Mygalomorphae
- Family: Bemmeridae
- Genus: Spiroctenus
- Species: S. lightfooti

Binomial name
- Spiroctenus lightfooti (Purcell, 1902)

Synonyms
- Hermachastes lightfooti Purcell, 1902

Species of spider

Spiroctenus lightfooti is a species of spider in the family Bemmeridae. It occurs in the Western Cape and Northern Cape provinces of South Africa.

== Distribution ==
Spiroctenus lightfooti has been recorded from Table Mountain National Park Signal Hill and Worcester in the Western Cape, and Brandvlei in the Northern Cape.

== Habitat ==
The species inhabits the Fynbos and Nama Karoo biomes and constructs simple burrows with a turret around the entrance. The type male was collected from under stones.

== Description ==
Both sexes of Spiroctenus lightfooti are known to science. The carapace is pale ochraceous with the cephalic region often faintly darkened with a brownish tinge, more darkly so along the median line and towards the lateral borders. The chelicerae, pedipalps, and legs are pale ochraceous. The sternum and underside of the coxae are pale yellowish. The underside of the opisthosoma and most of the lateral surface are pale yellowish, with a large spot above and a small one in front of each of the posterior spinnerets. The upper surface shows an irregular black pattern with numerous small and some large pale yellowish spots. The total length is 9-12 millimeters for males and 14 millimeters for females.

== Conservation ==
The species is listed as Data Deficient, as more sampling is needed to determine the species range. It is protected in Table Mountain National Park.
