= Spiroctenus broomi =

Broom’s Spiroctenus Trapdoor Spider

Scientific classification
- Kingdom: Animalia
- Phylum: Arthropoda
- Subphylum: Chelicerata
- Class: Arachnida
- Order: Araneae
- Infraorder: Mygalomorphae
- Family: Bemmeridae
- Genus: Spiroctenus
- Species: S. broomi

Binomial name
- Spiroctenus broomi Tucker, 1917

Species of spider

Spiroctenus broomi is a species of spider in the family Bemmeridae. It is endemic to the Western Cape province of South Africa.

== Distribution ==
Spiroctenus broomi is known only from the type locality in Stellenbosch.

== Habitat ==
The species inhabits the Fynbos Biome and constructs sloping burrows with looping passages connecting lower and upper portions, featuring a low turret around the entrance.

== Description ==
Only females of Spiroctenus broomi are known to science. The spider is very dark in coloration, with a dark infuscated brown carapace. The upper opisthosoma is dull purplish black with faint testaceous flecks, while the underside is slightly paler. The genital plate and lung operculae are pale brown. The sternum and coxae are lighter, redder brown than the carapace. The legs are dark, especially the anterior ones, with the posterior legs being slightly lighter. The labium bears 4-5 cuspules and the maxillae have approximately 40 cuspules. The total length is 25 millimeters.

== Conservation ==
The species is listed as Data Deficient for taxonomic reasons, as males remain unknown and the full species range requires further study.
