= Homostola vulpecula =

Grassland Wafer-Lid Trapdoor Spider

Conservation status
- Least Concern (SANBI Red List)

Scientific classification
- Kingdom: Animalia
- Phylum: Arthropoda
- Subphylum: Chelicerata
- Class: Arachnida
- Order: Araneae
- Infraorder: Mygalomorphae
- Family: Bemmeridae
- Genus: Homostola
- Species: H. vulpecula

Binomial name
- Homostola vulpecula Simon, 1892

Species of spider

Homostola vulpecula is a species of spider in the family Bemmeridae. It is endemic to South Africa and serves as the type species of the genus Homostola.

== Distribution ==
Homostola vulpecula has been recorded from four provinces in South Africa: Gauteng, KwaZulu-Natal, Limpopo, and Mpumalanga. It occurs in numerous protected areas including Groenkloof Nature Reserve, Kliprivierberg Nature Reserve, Mkuze Game Reserve, Ngome State Forest, and Lekgalameetse Nature Reserve.

== Habitat ==
This species is commonly found in leaf litter and is easily collected in pitfall traps. It inhabits the Grassland, Indian Ocean Coastal Belt, and Savanna biomes.

== Description ==
Only females of Homostola vulpecula have been formally described, though males have been collected. The carapace is dark brown to olive brown, darker around the edges and in the eye region. The chelicerae are dark with dark setae around the edges. The opisthosoma is purplish with irregular chevron patterns and numerous dark setae. The ventral surface is pale. The legs are olive brown with dark setae. The labium bears 13-15 cuspules. Males possess a long spur on the side and two pointed spurs located more ventrally.

== Ecology ==
Females construct fairly shallow burrows 16-20 centimeters deep under leaf litter, covered with a loose-fitting lid. Males are more active and frequently collected in pitfall traps, and in urban areas they sometimes drown in swimming pools.

== Conservation ==
The species is listed as Least Concern due to its wide geographical range across multiple provinces. It is protected in several nature reserves and has no known significant threats.
