= Spiroctenus pardalina =

Scientific classification
- Kingdom: Animalia
- Phylum: Arthropoda
- Subphylum: Chelicerata
- Class: Arachnida
- Order: Araneae
- Infraorder: Mygalomorphae
- Family: Bemmeridae
- Genus: Spiroctenus
- Species: S. pardalina

Binomial name
- Spiroctenus pardalina (Simon, 1903)

Synonyms
- Bemmeris pardalina Simon, 1903; Bemmeris pardaliana Roewer, 1942

Species of spider

Spiroctenus pardalina is a species of spider in the family Bemmeridae. It is endemic to South Africa, though no exact type locality was provided in the original description.

== Distribution ==
The distribution of Spiroctenus pardalina is unknown, as no exact locality was provided in the original description.

== Description ==
Spiroctenus pardalina is known only from juvenile specimens. The carapace is almost glabrous and the eye group is twice as wide as long. The labium bears four cuspules.

== Conservation ==
The species is listed as Data Deficient for taxonomic reasons, as only juveniles are known and the species range is undetermined. More sampling is needed to collect adults and determine the species distribution.
