= Spiroctenus cambierae =

Cambier’s Spiroctenus Trapdoor Spider

Scientific classification
- Kingdom: Animalia
- Phylum: Arthropoda
- Subphylum: Chelicerata
- Class: Arachnida
- Order: Araneae
- Infraorder: Mygalomorphae
- Family: Bemmeridae
- Genus: Spiroctenus
- Species: S. cambierae

Binomial name
- Spiroctenus cambierae (Purcell, 1902)

Synonyms
- Hermachastes cambierae Purcell, 1902

Species of spider

Spiroctenus cambierae is a species of spider in the family Bemmeridae. It is endemic to the Western Cape province of South Africa.

== Distribution ==
Spiroctenus cambierae has been recorded from several localities in the Western Cape, including Caledon Houwhoek, Pniel, and Klapmuts.

== Habitat ==
The species inhabits the Fynbos Biome as a ground-dwelling burrow constructor.

== Description ==
Both sexes of Spiroctenus cambierae are known to science. The carapace and legs are dull brown with an olive tinge. The opisthosoma is dark, almost black, with a narrow band of confluent dull testaceous spots down the center of the ventral surface. The lung operculae, genital plate, and spinnerets are similar in color to the sternum, being slightly lighter than the carapace. The total length is 17 millimeters.

== Conservation ==
The species is listed as Data Deficient, as more sampling is needed to determine the full species range.
