= Spiroctenus pilosus =

Smithfield Spiroctenus Wishbone Trapdoor Spider

Scientific classification
- Kingdom: Animalia
- Phylum: Arthropoda
- Subphylum: Chelicerata
- Class: Arachnida
- Order: Araneae
- Infraorder: Mygalomorphae
- Family: Bemmeridae
- Genus: Spiroctenus
- Species: S. pilosus

Binomial name
- Spiroctenus pilosus Tucker, 1917

Species of spider

Spiroctenus pilosus is a species of spider in the family Bemmeridae. It is endemic to the Free State province of South Africa.

== Distribution ==
Spiroctenus pilosus has been recorded from Edenville Farm Lusthof and Smithfield.

== Habitat ==
The species inhabits the Grassland Biome as a ground-dwelling burrow constructor.

== Description ==
Only females of Spiroctenus pilosus are known to science. The carapace is medium brown with the cephalic region infuscated, especially along median and lateral lines, and showing slight infuscate radiations from the fovea. The sternum and coxae of legs are ochraceous brown, slightly redder anteriorly. The labium is dark. The chelicerae are red-brown below and darker above. The femora of legs are ochraceous, tinged olivaceous above, and from the patella onwards are ochraceous brown, becoming slightly redder distally. The cheliceral furrow has nine promarginal teeth and 9-10 denticles. The labium has few spine-like hairs and the maxillae have approximately 30 cuspules. The total length is 20 millimeters.

== Conservation ==
The species is listed as Data Deficient for taxonomic reasons, as males remain unknown and the full species range requires further study.
