= Spiroctenus lignicola =

Hluhluwe Spiroctenus Trapdoor Spider

Scientific classification
- Kingdom: Animalia
- Phylum: Arthropoda
- Subphylum: Chelicerata
- Class: Arachnida
- Order: Araneae
- Infraorder: Mygalomorphae
- Family: Bemmeridae
- Genus: Spiroctenus
- Species: S. lignicola

Binomial name
- Spiroctenus lignicola Lawrence, 1937

Species of spider

Spiroctenus lignicola is a species of spider in the family Bemmeridae. It is endemic to KwaZulu-Natal province of South Africa.

The specific name lignicola is Latin for "wood-dweller".

== Distribution ==
Spiroctenus lignicola is known only from the type locality at Hluhluwe Nature Reserve.

== Habitat ==
The species inhabits the Savanna Biome as a ground-dwelling burrow constructor.

== Description ==
Only females of Spiroctenus lignicola are known to science. The spider is light reddish-brown in color with a yellow opisthosoma bearing a brown tree-like pattern marking. The cheliceral furrow has 12 promarginal teeth and 7-8 denticles. The labium bears 16 cuspules and the maxillae have about 50 cuspules. The paired tarsal claws IV have 4-5 teeth on the inner margin and 0-1 teeth on the outer margin. The total length is 19.2 millimeters including chelicerae.

== Conservation ==
The species is listed as Data Deficient for taxonomic reasons, as males remain unknown and the full species range requires further study.
