= Spiroctenus coeruleus =

Pietermaritzburg Spiroctenus Trapdoor Spider

Scientific classification
- Kingdom: Animalia
- Phylum: Arthropoda
- Subphylum: Chelicerata
- Class: Arachnida
- Order: Araneae
- Infraorder: Mygalomorphae
- Family: Bemmeridae
- Genus: Spiroctenus
- Species: S. coeruleus

Binomial name
- Spiroctenus coeruleus Lawrence, 1952

Species of spider

Spiroctenus coeruleus is a species of spider in the family Bemmeridae. It is endemic to KwaZulu-Natal province of South Africa.

== Distribution ==
Spiroctenus coeruleus has been recorded from Pietermaritzburg and Ndumo Game Reserve.

== Habitat ==
The species inhabits the Savanna Biome as a ground-dwelling burrow constructor.

== Description ==
Only males of Spiroctenus coeruleus are known to science. The cephalothorax and appendages appear slate blue due to a fine coating of powdery substance. The opisthosoma is pale brown above with small symmetrical darker markings, and yellow-brown below. The total length is 15 millimeters.

== Conservation ==
The species is listed as Data Deficient for taxonomic reasons, as females remain unknown and the full species range requires further study.
