= Spiroctenus sagittarius =

Brandvlei Spiroctenus Trapdoor Spider

Scientific classification
- Kingdom: Animalia
- Phylum: Arthropoda
- Subphylum: Chelicerata
- Class: Arachnida
- Order: Araneae
- Infraorder: Mygalomorphae
- Family: Bemmeridae
- Genus: Spiroctenus
- Species: S. sagittarius

Binomial name
- Spiroctenus sagittarius (Purcell, 1902)

Synonyms
- Hermachastes sagittarius Purcell, 1902

Species of spider

Spiroctenus sagittarius is a species of spider in the family Bemmeridae. It is endemic to the Western Cape province of South Africa.

== Distribution ==
Spiroctenus sagittarius is known only from the type locality at Brandvlei, Worcester.

== Habitat ==
The species inhabits the Fynbos Biome as a ground-dwelling burrow constructor.

== Description ==
Both sexes of Spiroctenus sagittarius are known to science. Males are pale ochraceous with the cephalic region of the carapace showing a median and two lateral well-marked fusco-olivaceous bands. The underside of the sternum, coxae, and especially the posterior femora are very pale, almost white. The opisthosoma is colored similarly to S. lightfooti, except that the black of the upper surface forms a series of well-marked obliquely transverse stripes, separated by broader parallel bands of pale yellow and united along the median line.

Females have coloration similar to males, but the carapace is faintly infuscated, except on the pale ochraceous band on each side of the dark median stripe of the cephalic portion. The chelicerae are also mostly weakly infuscated. The underside is pale ochraceous and the femora of the legs are often faintly greenish. The total length is 10.5 millimeters for males and 19.5 millimeters for females.

== Conservation ==
The species is listed as Data Deficient, as more sampling is needed to determine the species range.
