= Homostola zebrina =

Zebra Homostola Wafer-Lid Trapdoor Spider

Conservation status
- Least Concern (SANBI Red List)

Scientific classification
- Kingdom: Animalia
- Phylum: Arthropoda
- Subphylum: Chelicerata
- Class: Arachnida
- Order: Araneae
- Infraorder: Mygalomorphae
- Family: Bemmeridae
- Genus: Homostola
- Species: H. zebrina

Binomial name
- Homostola zebrina Purcell, 1902

Species of spider

Homostola zebrina is a species of spider in the family Bemmeridae. It occurs in South Africa and Eswatini.

== Distribution ==
Homostola zebrina has been recorded from four provinces in South Africa: Gauteng, KwaZulu-Natal, Limpopo, and Mpumalanga. It also occurs in Eswatini. The species is found in protected areas including Ngome State Forest and uMkhuze Game Reserve.

== Habitat ==
This species is a free-living ground dweller that is more abundant in grassy areas but also occurs in pine plantations under rocks and stones. It inhabits the Grassland, Indian Ocean Coastal Belt, and Savanna biomes.

== Description ==
Homostola zebrina is notable for being the only species in the genus where both sexes have been described. Females have a yellow or testaceous yellow carapace with pale yellow sides. The cephalic region is broad and faintly infuscate with a narrow dark median stripe. The chelicerae are reddish brown. The labium bears 5-6 and 2-4 teeth. The tarsi and metatarsi of legs I and II are thickly scopulate. Males have a swollen tibia I that carries very stout twisted adjacent distal spines, each raised on a tubercle. The total length is 23 millimeters.

== Ecology ==
Females construct burrows under rocks and stones in sheltered habitats, which increases survival rates in areas with heavy rainfall. Burrows containing females with young typically have only one entrance, while those without young have two distinct entrances forming a T-shape. Males are more active and easily collected in pitfall traps.

== Conservation ==
The species is listed as Least Concern due to its wide geographical range and stable populations. It is protected in Ngome State Forest and uMkhuze Game Reserve with no significant known threats.
