= Homostola pardalina =

Barberton Wafer-Lid Trapdoor Spider

Conservation status
- Least Concern (SANBI Red List)

Scientific classification
- Kingdom: Animalia
- Phylum: Arthropoda
- Subphylum: Chelicerata
- Class: Arachnida
- Order: Araneae
- Infraorder: Mygalomorphae
- Family: Bemmeridae
- Genus: Homostola
- Species: H. pardalina

Binomial name
- Homostola pardalina (Hewitt, 1913)

Synonyms
- Paromostola pardalina Hewitt, 1913

Species of spider

Homostola pardalina is a species of spider in the family Bemmeridae. It is endemic to South Africa.

== Distribution ==
Homostola pardalina has been recorded from three provinces in South Africa: Gauteng, Limpopo, and Mpumalanga. Notable localities include Suikerbosrand Nature Reserve, Luvhondo Nature Reserve, and areas around Barberton.

== Habitat ==
This species is a free-living ground dweller commonly found in leaf litter. It has been sampled from pitfall traps in the Grassland and Savanna biomes.

== Description ==
Only females of Homostola pardalina have been formally described, though males have been collected. The carapace and appendages are chestnut brown above, with the patellae of the first two pairs of legs being paler. The opisthosoma shows pale coloration over an anterior median area, while elsewhere it is dark with numerous pale spots at the sides and posteriorly. The lower surfaces are pale. The labium bears more than 50 cuspules. The posterior sternal sigilla are oval and elongated. The fovea is deep, wide and procurved. The total length is 13 millimeters.

== Conservation ==
The species is listed as Least Concern due to its fairly wide geographical range across multiple provinces. It is protected in Suikerbosrand Nature Reserve and Luvhondo Nature Reserve.
