= Spiroctenus minor =

Alicedale Spiroctenus Trapdoor Spider

Scientific classification
- Kingdom: Animalia
- Phylum: Arthropoda
- Subphylum: Chelicerata
- Class: Arachnida
- Order: Araneae
- Infraorder: Mygalomorphae
- Family: Bemmeridae
- Genus: Spiroctenus
- Species: S. minor

Binomial name
- Spiroctenus minor (Hewitt, 1913)

Synonyms
- Bessia minor Hewitt, 1913

Species of spider

Spiroctenus minor is a species of spider in the family Bemmeridae. It is endemic to the Eastern Cape province of South Africa.

== Distribution ==
Spiroctenus minor is known only from the type locality at Alicedale.

== Habitat ==
The species inhabits the Thicket Biome and constructs burrows sloping downwards for 18-20 centimeters with the lower portion free of silk.

== Description ==
Both sexes of Spiroctenus minor are known to science. Females have a pale chestnut olive carapace and appendages above, with the patellae of the first two pairs of legs being paler and showing a reddish brown tinge. The opisthosoma is pale dorsally with an extensive but indefinite variegated blackish pattern. The lower surfaces are pale brown, with the chelicerae, coxae of pedipalps, and labium showing a reddish tinge. The total length of females is 22.5 millimeters and males 15.2 millimeters.

== Conservation ==
The species is listed as Data Deficient, as more sampling is needed to determine the species range.
