= Spiroctenus flavopunctatus =

Hogsback Spiroctenus Trapdoor Spider

Scientific classification
- Kingdom: Animalia
- Phylum: Arthropoda
- Subphylum: Chelicerata
- Class: Arachnida
- Order: Araneae
- Infraorder: Mygalomorphae
- Family: Bemmeridae
- Genus: Spiroctenus
- Species: S. flavopunctatus

Binomial name
- Spiroctenus flavopunctatus (Purcell, 1903)

Synonyms
- Hermachastes flavopunctatus Purcell, 1903

Species of spider

Spiroctenus flavopunctatus is a species of spider in the family Bemmeridae. It is endemic to the Eastern Cape province of South Africa.

== Distribution ==
Spiroctenus flavopunctatus is known only from the type locality in the Amatola Mountains at Hogsback.

== Habitat ==
The species inhabits the Forest Biome, with the type specimen found in a rotten tree trunk.

== Description ==
Only females of Spiroctenus flavopunctatus are known to science. The spider is olivaceous in color with yellow streaks. The chelicerae are nearly black. The legs are olivaceous, but the patellae and naked strips on the tibiae and metatarsi are yellowish. The opisthosoma is deep purplish black with numerous conspicuous roundish pale yellow spots above and at the sides, but lacks the typical tree-pattern. Females have 28-32 cuspules on the labium and 38-52 cuspules on the maxillae. The paired tarsal claws have 2-4 teeth on the inner margin and 2-3 teeth on the outer margin. The total length is 17 millimeters.

== Conservation ==
The species is listed as Data Deficient for taxonomic reasons, as males remain unknown and the full species range requires further study.
