= Spiroctenus fuligineus =

Brakkloof Spiroctenus Trapdoor Spider

Scientific classification
- Kingdom: Animalia
- Phylum: Arthropoda
- Subphylum: Chelicerata
- Class: Arachnida
- Order: Araneae
- Infraorder: Mygalomorphae
- Family: Bemmeridae
- Genus: Spiroctenus
- Species: S. fuligineus

Binomial name
- Spiroctenus fuligineus (Pocock, 1902)

Synonyms
- Hermachastes fuligineus Pocock, 1902

Species of spider

Spiroctenus fuligineus is a species of spider in the family Bemmeridae. It is endemic to the Eastern Cape province of South Africa.

== Distribution ==
Spiroctenus fuligineus is known only from the type locality at Brakkloof.

== Habitat ==
The species inhabits the Thicket Biome as a ground-dwelling burrow constructor.

== Description ==
Only females of Spiroctenus fuligineus are known to science. The body and legs are very dark, appearing uniformly blackish grey. The total length is 20 millimeters.

== Conservation ==
The species is listed as Data Deficient for taxonomic reasons, as males remain unknown and the full species range requires further study.
