= Spiroctenus gooldi =

Goold’s Spiroctenus Trapdoor Spider

Scientific classification
- Kingdom: Animalia
- Phylum: Arthropoda
- Subphylum: Chelicerata
- Class: Arachnida
- Order: Araneae
- Infraorder: Mygalomorphae
- Family: Bemmeridae
- Genus: Spiroctenus
- Species: S. gooldi

Binomial name
- Spiroctenus gooldi (Purcell, 1903)

Synonyms
- Hermachastes gooldi Purcell, 1903

Species of spider

Spiroctenus gooldi is a species of spider in the family Bemmeridae. It is endemic to the Western Cape province of South Africa.

== Distribution ==
Spiroctenus gooldi has been recorded from Malmesbury, Stompneus at St Helena Bay, and St James at False Bay. All specimens were collected prior to 1903.

== Habitat ==
The species inhabits the Fynbos Biome as a ground-dwelling burrow constructor.

== Description ==
Only males of Spiroctenus gooldi are known to science. The opisthosoma shows transverse stripes that meet or nearly meet in the median line. The total length is 10-11 millimeters.

== Conservation ==
The species is listed as Data Deficient for taxonomic reasons, as females remain unknown and the current species range requires further study.
