= Spiroctenus pectiniger =

Matjiesfontein Spiroctenus Trapdoor Spider

Scientific classification
- Kingdom: Animalia
- Phylum: Arthropoda
- Subphylum: Chelicerata
- Class: Arachnida
- Order: Araneae
- Infraorder: Mygalomorphae
- Family: Bemmeridae
- Genus: Spiroctenus
- Species: S. pectiniger

Binomial name
- Spiroctenus pectiniger (Simon, 1903)

Synonyms
- Ctenonemus pectiniger Simon, 1903

Species of spider

Spiroctenus pectiniger is a species of spider in the family Bemmeridae. It is endemic to the Western Cape province of South Africa.

== Distribution ==
Spiroctenus pectiniger is known only from the type locality at Matjiesfontein.

== Habitat ==
The species inhabits the Fynbos Biome and constructs burrows leading into a larger chamber, out of which two side burrows branch. The entrance has silk lining slightly spread out on the soil surface, made flush with the surface or forming a very short turret covered with bits of plant material.

== Description ==
Spiroctenus pectiniger is known only from juvenile specimens. The carapace is almost glabrous. The anterior median and lateral eyes are subequal in size. The labium bears 4-5 cuspules.

== Conservation ==
The species is listed as Data Deficient for taxonomic reasons, as only juveniles are known and more sampling is needed to collect adults and determine the species range.
