= Spiroctenus validus =

Breederiver Spiroctenus Trapdoor Spider

Scientific classification
- Kingdom: Animalia
- Phylum: Arthropoda
- Subphylum: Chelicerata
- Class: Arachnida
- Order: Araneae
- Infraorder: Mygalomorphae
- Family: Bemmeridae
- Genus: Spiroctenus
- Species: S. validus

Binomial name
- Spiroctenus validus (Purcell, 1902)

Synonyms
- Hermachastes validus Purcell, 1902

Species of spider

Spiroctenus validus is a species of spider in the family Bemmeridae. It is endemic to the Western Cape province of South Africa.

== Distribution ==
Spiroctenus validus has been recorded from Ashton Bonnie Vale farm near Bushman's Drift on the Breede River, Swellendam, and Bontebok National Park.

== Habitat ==
The species inhabits the Fynbos Biome and constructs burrows with a turret of grass around the entrance.

== Description ==
Both sexes of Spiroctenus validus are known to science. The inner side of tibia I bears a pair of distal tubercles each bearing 1-2 stout spurs. Tibia I is also strongly incrassated at the apex and very thick. All tarsi are thickly and broadly scopulate. The spider is olivaceous in color with an infuscate carapace. The legs are more yellowish and the femora are not as dark. The tibiae and metatarsi are yellow brown. Large infuscate spots are present above the spinnerets on the ventral surface. The total length is 16 millimeters for males and 25.5 millimeters for females.

== Conservation ==
The species is listed as Data Deficient, as more collecting is needed to determine the full species range. It is protected in Bontebok National Park.
