= Atmetochilus =

Scientific classification
- Kingdom: Animalia
- Phylum: Arthropoda
- Subphylum: Chelicerata
- Class: Arachnida
- Order: Araneae
- Infraorder: Mygalomorphae
- Family: Bemmeridae
- Genus: Atmetochilus; Simon, 1903

Type species
- Atmetochilus fossor

Species
- 6, see text

Genus of spiders

Atmetochilus is a genus of spiders in the family Bemmeridae. It was first described in 1887 by Simon. As of July 2021, it contains 6 species.

== Species ==
Atmetochilus comprises the following species:

- Atmetochilus atriceps Pocock, 1900
- Atmetochilus fossor Simon, 1887
- Atmetochilus koponeni Zonstein & Marusik, 2016
- Atmetochilus lehtineni Zonstein & Marusik, 2016
- Atmetochilus songsangchotei Kunsete & Warrit, 2020
- Atmetochilus sumatranus Zonstein & Marusik, 2016
