= Homostola =

Scientific classification
- Kingdom: Animalia
- Phylum: Arthropoda
- Subphylum: Chelicerata
- Class: Arachnida
- Order: Araneae
- Infraorder: Mygalomorphae
- Family: Bemmeridae
- Genus: Homostola; Simon, 1892

Type species
- H. vulpecula Simon, 1892

Species
- 5, see text

Synonyms
- Paromostola Purcell, 1903; Stictogaster Purcell, 1902

Genus of spiders

Homostola is a genus of African mygalomorph spiders in the family Bemmeridae. It was first described by Eugène Louis Simon in 1892. Originally placed with the Ctenizidae, it was transferred to the wafer trapdoor spiders in 1985, and to the Bemmeridae in 2020. It is a senior synonym of Stictogaster and Paromostola.

== Species ==
As of September 2025 it contains five species:

- Homostola abernethyi (Purcell, 1903) – South Africa
- Homostola pardalina (Hewitt, 1913) – South Africa
- Homostola reticulata (Purcell, 1902) – South Africa
- Homostola vulpecula Simon, 1892 (type) – South Africa
- Homostola zebrina Purcell, 1902 – South Africa, Eswatini
