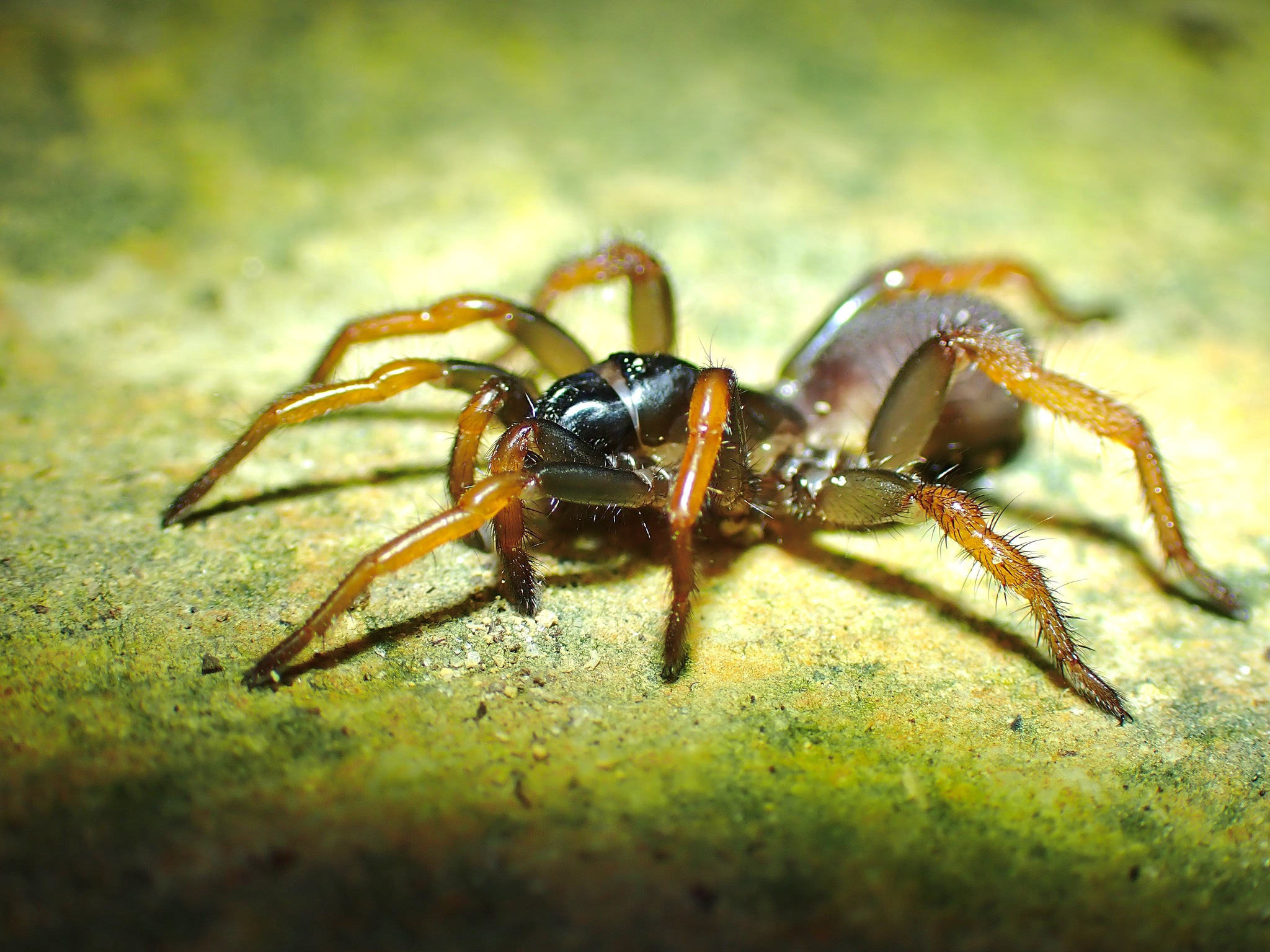

Scientific classification
- Kingdom: Animalia
- Phylum: Arthropoda
- Subphylum: Chelicerata
- Class: Arachnida
- Order: Araneae
- Infraorder: Mygalomorphae
- Family: Bemmeridae
- Genus: Damarchus; Thorell, 1891

Type species
- D. workmani Thorell, 1891

Species
- 9, see text

= Damarchus (spider) =

Genus of spiders

Damarchus is a genus of Asian mygalomorph spiders in the family Bemmeridae, first described by Tamerlan Thorell in 1891.

Damarchus workmani is most often sighted outdoors, and during the month of March.

== Species ==
As of October 2025 it contained 10 species:

- Damarchus assamensis Hirst, 1909 — India
- Damarchus bifidus Gravely, 1935 – India
- Damarchus cavernicola Abraham, 1924 — Malaysia
- Damarchus dao Schwendinger & Hongpadharakiree, 2023 — Thailand
- Damarchus inazuma Kunsete & Warrit, 2025 — Thailand
- Damarchus lanna Schwendinger & Hongpadharakiree, 2023 — Thailand
- Damarchus montanus (Thorell, 1890) — Indonesia (Sumatra)
- Damarchus oatesi Thorell, 1895 — Myanmar
- Damarchus pylorus Schwendinger & Hongpadharakiree, 2023 — Thailand
- Damarchus workmani Thorell, 1891 — Singapore

Damarchus inazuma was added to the genus in 2025. The species name comes from the character Inazuma from the manga One Piece.
