= Spiroctenus =

Scientific classification
- Kingdom: Animalia
- Phylum: Arthropoda
- Subphylum: Chelicerata
- Class: Arachnida
- Order: Araneae
- Infraorder: Mygalomorphae
- Family: Bemmeridae
- Genus: Spiroctenus; Simon, 1889

Type species
- S. personatus Simon, 1888

Species
- 30, see text

Synonyms
- Bemmeris Simon, 1903; Bessia Pocock, 1900; Ctenonemus Simon, 1903

Genus of spiders

Spiroctenus is a genus of African mygalomorph spiders in the family Bemmeridae. It was first described by Eugène Louis Simon in 1889. Originally placed with the Ctenizidae, it was transferred to the funnel-web trapdoor spiders in 1985, and to the Bemmeridae in 2020. It is a senior synonym of Bemmeris, Bessia, and Ctenonemus.

== Species ==
As of September 2025 it contains thirty species, all found in southern Africa:

- Spiroctenus armatus Hewitt, 1913 – South Africa
- Spiroctenus broomi Tucker, 1917 – South Africa
- Spiroctenus cambierae (Purcell, 1902) – South Africa
- Spiroctenus coeruleus Lawrence, 1952 – South Africa
- Spiroctenus collinus (Pocock, 1900) – South Africa
- Spiroctenus curvipes Hewitt, 1919 – South Africa
- Spiroctenus exilis Lawrence, 1938 – South Africa
- Spiroctenus flavopunctatus (Purcell, 1903) – South Africa
- Spiroctenus fossorius (Pocock, 1900) – South Africa
- Spiroctenus fuligineus (Pocock, 1902) – South Africa
- Spiroctenus gooldi (Purcell, 1903) – South Africa
- Spiroctenus inermis (Purcell, 1902) – South Africa
- Spiroctenus latus Purcell, 1904 – South Africa
- Spiroctenus lightfooti (Purcell, 1902) – South Africa
- Spiroctenus lignicola Lawrence, 1937 – South Africa
- Spiroctenus londinensis Hewitt, 1919 – South Africa
- Spiroctenus marleyi Hewitt, 1919 – South Africa
- Spiroctenus minor (Hewitt, 1913) – South Africa
- Spiroctenus pallidipes Purcell, 1904 – South Africa
- Spiroctenus pardalina (Simon, 1903) – South Africa
- Spiroctenus pectiniger (Simon, 1903) – South Africa
- Spiroctenus personatus Simon, 1888 (type) – Southern Africa
- Spiroctenus pilosus Tucker, 1917 – South Africa
- Spiroctenus punctatus Hewitt, 1916 – South Africa
- Spiroctenus purcelli Tucker, 1917 – South Africa
- Spiroctenus sagittarius (Purcell, 1902) – South Africa
- Spiroctenus schreineri (Purcell, 1903) – South Africa
- Spiroctenus spinipalpis Hewitt, 1919 – Eswatini
- Spiroctenus tricalcaratus (Purcell, 1903) – South Africa
- Spiroctenus validus (Purcell, 1902) – South Africa

Nomen dubium

- S. lusitanus Franganillo, 1920
