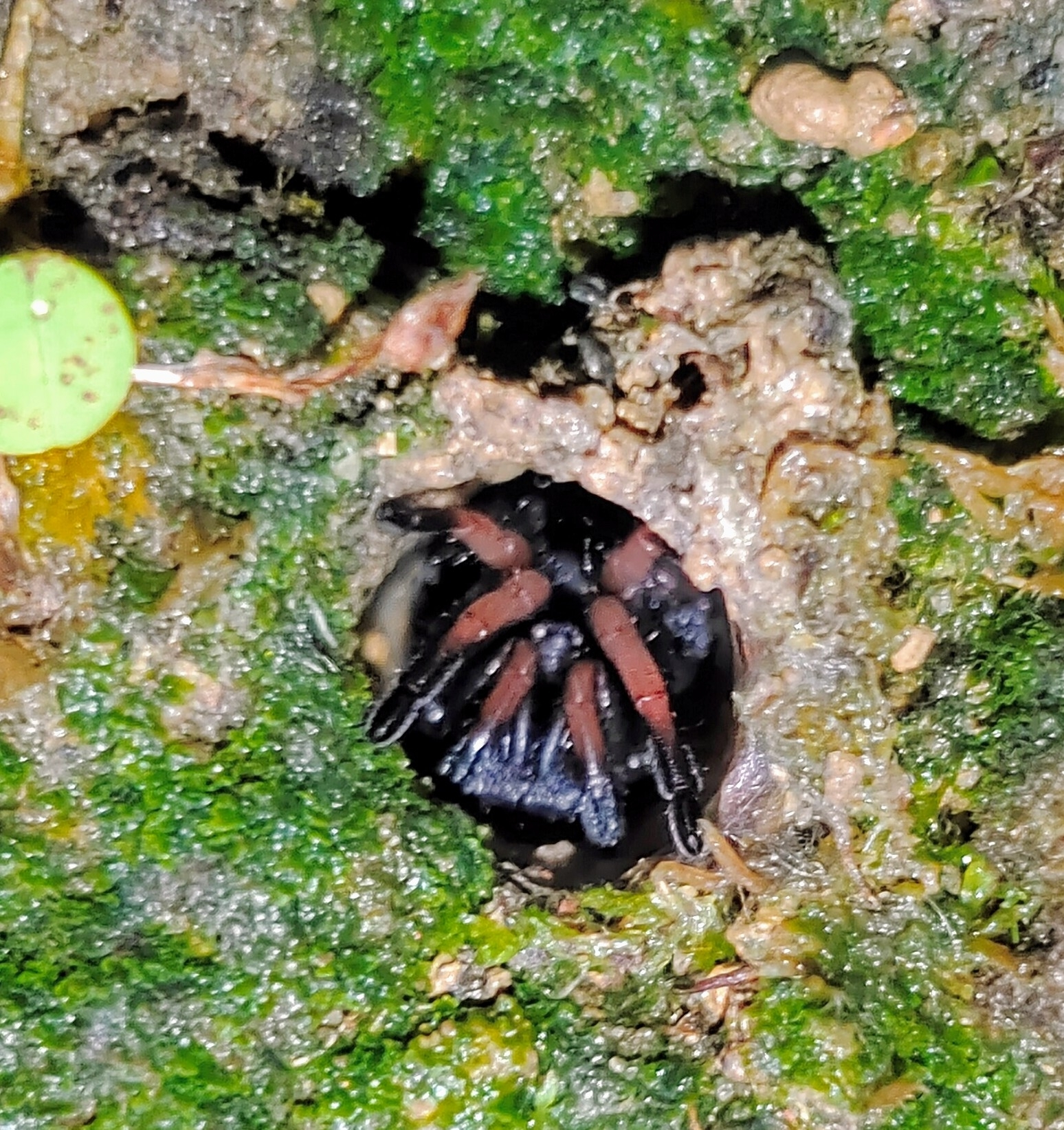
- Damarchus workmani in Singapore

Scientific classification
- Kingdom: Animalia
- Phylum: Arthropoda
- Subphylum: Chelicerata
- Class: Arachnida
- Order: Araneae
- Infraorder: Mygalomorphae
- Clade: Avicularioidea
- Family: Bemmeridae; Simon, 1903

Genera
- See text.

Diversity
- 4 genera, 52 species
- blue: reported countries (WSC)

= Bemmeridae =

Family of spiders

Bemmeridae is a family of African and Asian mygalomorph spiders that was first described as the tribe Bemmereae by Eugène Simon in 1903. It was elevated to a subfamily of Nemesiidae (as Bemmerinae) in 1985, then to its own family in 2020.

== Genera ==
As of January 2026, this family includes four genera and 52 species:

- Atmetochilus Simon, 1887 – Indonesia, Myanmar, Thailand
- Damarchus Thorell, 1891 – Southeast Asia, India
- Homostola Simon, 1892 – Eswatini, South Africa
- Spiroctenus Simon, 1889 – Mozambique, Eswatini, South Africa
